= List of NGC objects (3001–4000) =

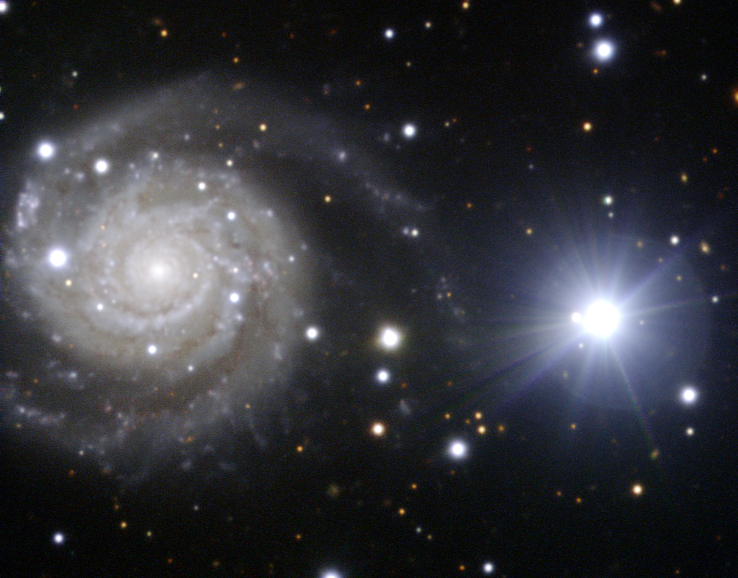
Image of the spiral galaxy NGC 3244 was taken with the help of the President of the Czech Republic, Václav Klaus, during his visit to ESO's Paranal Observatory

This is a list of NGC objects 3001–4000 from the New General Catalogue (NGC). The astronomical catalogue is composed mainly of star clusters, nebulae, and galaxies. Other objects in the catalogue can be found in the other subpages of the list of NGC objects.

The constellation information in these tables is taken from The Complete New General Catalogue and Index Catalogue of Nebulae and Star Clusters by J. L. E. Dreyer, which was accessed using the "VizieR Service". Galaxy types are identified using the NASA/IPAC Extragalactic Database. Other data are from the SIMBAD Astronomical Database unless otherwise stated.

== 3001–3100 ==
NGC number	Other names	Object type	Constellation	Right ascension (J2000)	Declination (J2000)	Apparent magnitude
3001		Spiral galaxy	Antlia	09^{h} 46^{m} 18.7^{s}	−30° 26′ 15″	11.83
3005		Spiral galaxy	Ursa Major	09^{h} 49^{m} 15.007^{s}	+44° 07′ 52.86″	14.94
3006		Spiral galaxy	Ursa Major	09^{h} 49^{m} 17.344^{s}	+44° 01′ 32.90″	15.57
3007		Lenticular galaxy	Sextans	09^{h} 47^{m} 45.62^{s}	−06° 26′ 17.4″	14.4
3008		Lenticular galaxy	Ursa Major	09^{h} 49^{m} 34.261^{s}	+44° 06′ 09.71″	15.23
3009		Lenticular galaxy	Ursa Major	09^{h} 50^{m} 33.2^{s}	+44° 18′ 52″	14.5
3021		Spiral galaxy	Leo Minor	09^{h} 50^{m} 57^{s}	33° 33′ 15″	12.2
3030		Lenticular galaxy	Hydra	09^{h} 50^{m} 10.5^{s}	−12° 13′ 35″	15
3031	Messier 81	Spiral galaxy	Ursa Major	09^{h} 55^{m} 33.2^{s}	+69° 03′ 55″	8.1
3032		Lenticular galaxy	Leo	09^{h} 52^{m} 08.2^{s}	+29° 14′ 12″	13.0
3033		Open cluster	Vela	09^{h} 48^{m} 30^{s}	−56° 26′	9.2
3034	Messier 82	Irregular galaxy	Ursa Major	09^{h} 55^{m} 52.2^{s}	+69° 40′ 49″	9.2
3035		Spiral galaxy	Sextans	09^{h} 51^{m} 54.0^{s}	−06° 49′ 15″	13.5
3041		Barred spiral galaxy	Leo	09^{h} 53^{m} 7.1^{s}	+16° 40′ 40″	10.36
3044		Barred spiral galaxy	Sextans	09^{h} 53^{m} 40.884^{s}	+01° 34′ 46.74″	12.5
3048		Spiral galaxy pair	Leo	09^{h} 54^{m} 56^{s}	16° 27′ 26″	16.3
3049		Spiral galaxy	Leo	09^{h} 54^{m} 49.8^{s}	+09° 16′ 17″	13.5
3052		Intermediate spiral galaxy	Hydra	09^{h} 54^{m} 27.93^{s}	−18° 38′ 20.0″	12.2
3054		Spiral galaxy	Hydra	09^{h} 54^{m} 28.9^{s}	−25° 42′ 07″	12.2
3059		Barred spiral galaxy	Carina	09^{h} 50^{m} 08.181^{s}	−73° 55′ 19.96″	11.24
3062		Spiral galaxy	Sextans	09^{h} 56^{m} 35.7961^{s}	+01° 25′ 42.814″	14.9g
3067		Intermediate spiral galaxy	Leo	09^{h} 58^{m}	+32° 22′	
3068	Arp 174	Lenticular galaxy	Leo	09^{h} 58^{m} 40.1457^{s}	+28° 52′ 38.283″	14.05
3073		Dwarf lenticular galaxy	Ursa Major	10^{h} 00^{m} 52.042^{s}	+55° 37′ 08.17″	13.40
3074		Barred spiral galaxy	Leo	09^{h} 59^{m} 41.2437^{s}	+35° 23′ 34.050″	14.2g
3077		Irregular galaxy	Ursa Major	10^{h} 03^{m} 20.0^{s}	+68° 44′ 02″	10.9
3079		Spiral galaxy	Ursa Major	10^{h} 01^{m} 58.5^{s}	+55° 40′ 50″	11.2
3081		Barred lenticular ring galaxy	Hydra	09^{h} 59^{m} 29.5^{s}	−22° 39′ 45″	13.5
3087		Elliptical galaxy	Antlia	09^{h} 59^{m} 08.66^{s}	−34° 13′ 30.8″	10.5

== 3101–3200 ==
NGC number	Other names	Object type	Constellation	Right ascension (J2000)	Declination (J2000)	Apparent magnitude
3106		Lenticular galaxy	Leo Minor	10^{h} 04^{m} 05.2636^{s}	+31° 11′ 07.756″	12.3
3109		Irregular galaxy	Hydra	10^{h} 03^{m} 06.7^{s}	−26° 09′ 32″	12
3110	NGC 3122; NGC 3518	Spiral galaxy	Leo	10^{h} 04^{m} 01.9^{s}	−06° 28′ 29″	13.5
3114		Open cluster	Carina	10^{h} 02^{m} 42^{s}	−60° 06′ 0″	+4.2
3115	Spindle Galaxy	Lenticular galaxy	Sextans	10^{h} 05^{m} 13.8^{s}	−07° 43′ 08″	11
3117		Elliptical galaxy	Sextans	10^{h} 06^{m} 10.5137^{s}	+02° 54′ 46.273″	14.3g
3120		Intermediate spiral galaxy	Antlia	10^{h} 05^{m} 23.0413^{s}	−34° 13′ 11.847″	13.52
3122	(Duplicate of NGC 3110)	Spiral galaxy	Leo	10^{h} 04^{m} 01.9^{s}	−06° 28′ 29″	13.5
3124		Barred spiral galaxy	Hydra	10^{h} 06^{m} 39.9044^{s}	−19° 13′ 17.421″	12.0
3125		Irregular galaxy	Antlia	10^{h} 06^{m} 33^{s}	−29° 56′ 05″	13.45
3132	Eight-Burst Nebula	Planetary nebula	Vela	10^{h} 07^{m} 01.8^{s}	−40° 26′ 11″	10.1
3137		Spiral galaxy	Antlia	10^{h} 09^{m} 07.3775^{s}	−29° 03′ 50.486″	11.5
3147		Spiral galaxy	Draco	10^{h} 16^{m} 53.7^{s}	+73° 24′ 03″	10.6
3156		Lenticular galaxy	Sextans	10^{h} 12^{m} 41.24591^{s}	+03° 07′ 45.6939″	12.30
3166		Lenticular galaxy	Sextans	10^{h} 13^{m} 45.6784^{s}	+03° 25′ 29.294″	10.5
3169		Spiral galaxy	Sextans	10^{h} 14^{m} 14.7^{s}	+03° 28′ 01″	10.3
3172	Polarissima Borealis	Lenticular galaxy	Ursa Minor	11^{h} 47^{m} 11.928^{s}	+89° 05′ 35.77″	14.9
3175		Spiral galaxy	Antlia	10^{h} 14^{m} 42.111^{s}	−28° 52′ 19.42″	12.08
3177		Spiral galaxy	Leo	10^{h} 16^{m} 33^{s}	+21° 07′ 23″	11.6
3180	(Located in NGC 3184)	Diffuse nebula	Ursa Major	10^{h} 18^{m} 17.0^{s}	+41° 25′ 26″	10.4
3181	(Located in NGC 3184)	Diffuse nebula	Ursa Major	10^{h} 18^{m} 11.5^{s}	+41° 24′ 46″	10.4
3182		Spiral galaxy	Ursa Major	10^{h} 19^{m} 33.3^{s}	+58° 12′ 20″	13.0
3183		Spiral galaxy	Draco	10^{h} 21^{m} 48.9^{s}	+74° 10′ 40″	12.5
3184		Spiral galaxy	Ursa Major	10^{h} 18^{m} 17.0^{s}	+41° 25′ 26″	10.4
3185		Spiral galaxy	Leo	10^{h} 17^{m} 38.7^{s}	+21° 41′ 17″	12.9
3186		Galaxy	Leo	10^{h} 17^{m} 38.0^{s}	+06° 58′ 16″	15.0
3187		Spiral galaxy	Leo	10^{h} 17^{m} 47.9^{s}	+21° 52′ 24″	13.8
3188		Spiral galaxy	Ursa Major	10^{h} 19^{m} 42.8^{s}	+57° 25′ 25″	14.7
3189	(Duplicate of NGC 3190)	Spiral galaxy	Leo	10^{h} 18^{m} 05.6^{s}	+21° 49′ 52″	11.9
3190		Spiral galaxy	Leo	10^{h} 18^{m} 05.6^{s}	+21° 49′ 52″	11.9
3191		Spiral galaxy	Ursa Major	10^{h} 19^{m} 05.2^{s}	+46° 27′ 17″	13.9
3192	(Duplicate of NGC 3191)	Spiral galaxy	Ursa Major	10^{h} 18^{m} 58.4^{s}	+46° 27′ 16″	16.1
3193		Elliptical galaxy	Leo	10^{h} 18^{m} 25.0^{s}	+21° 53′ 37″	12.4
3194		Spiral galaxy	Draco	10^{h} 17^{m} 40.2^{s}	+74° 20′ 50″	13.9
3195		Planetary nebula	Chamaeleon	10^{h} 09^{m} 20.9^{s}	−80° 51′ 31″	
3196		Galaxy	Leo	10^{h} 18^{m} 49.0^{s}	+27° 40′ 08″	15.7
3197		Spiral galaxy	Draco	10^{h} 14^{m} 28.2^{s}	+77° 49′ 12″	14.5
3198		Spiral galaxy	Ursa Major	10^{h} 19^{m} 54.8^{s}	+45° 33′ 01″	10.7
3199		Diffuse nebula	Carina	10^{h} 16^{m} 32.8^{s}	−57° 56′ 02″	
3200		Spiral galaxy	Hydra	10^{h} 18^{m} 36.4^{s}	−17° 58′ 57″	12.3

== 3201–3300 ==
NGC number	Other names	Object type	Constellation	Right ascension (J2000)	Declination (J2000)	Apparent magnitude
3201		Globular cluster	Vela	10^{h} 17^{m} 36.8^{s}	−46° 24′ 40″	9.2
3206		Barred spiral galaxy	Ursa Major	10^{h} 21^{m} 47.5922^{s}	+56° 55′ 49.519″	11.9
3218	(Duplicate of NGC 3183)	Spiral galaxy	Draco	10^{h} 21^{m} 48.9^{s}	+74° 10′ 40″	12.5
3222		Lenticular galaxy	Leo	10^{h} 22^{m} 34.4^{s}	+19° 53′ 12″	12.8
3223		Spiral galaxy	Antlia	10^{h} 21^{m} 35.076^{s}	−34° 16′ 00.44″	10.82
3226		Elliptical galaxy	Leo	10^{h} 23^{m} 27.1^{s}	+19° 53′ 55″	13.3
3227		Spiral galaxy	Leo	10^{h} 23^{m} 30.6^{s}	+19° 51′ 54″	13.5
3228		Open cluster	Vela	10^{h} 21^{m} 22^{s}	−51° 43′ 42″	6.0
3239		Irregular galaxy	Leo	10^{h} 25^{m} 00^{s}	17° 09′ 00″	13.5
3241		Spiral galaxy	Antlia	10^{h} 24^{m} 16.9527^{s}	−32° 28′ 57.830″	13.06
3242	Ghost of Jupiter; Eye Nebula	Planetary nebula	Hydra	10^{h} 24^{m} 46.1^{s}	−18° 38′ 33″	10.3
3244		Spiral galaxy	Antlia	10^{h} 25^{m} 29.2^{s}	−39° 49′ 40″	12.3
3245		Lenticular galaxy	Leo Minor	10^{h} 27^{m} 18.5^{s}	+28° 30′ 25″	11.6
3247	RCW 49	H II region	Carina	10^{h} 24^{m} 14.6^{s}	−57° 46′ 58″	
3254		Spiral galaxy	Leo Minor	10^{h} 29^{m} 19.922^{s}	+29° 29′ 29.18″	11.60
3256		Peculiar galaxy	Vela	10^{h} 27^{m} 51.3^{s}	−43° 54′ 13″	11.3
3258		Elliptical galaxy	Antlia	10^{h} 28^{m} 53.588^{s}	−35° 36′ 19.98″	11.72
3259		Barred spiral galaxy	Ursa Major	10^{h} 32^{m} 34.816^{s}	+65° 02′ 27.79″	
3260		Elliptical galaxy	Antlia	10^{h} 29^{m} 06.39496^{s}	−35° 35′ 42.4860″	12.67
3261		Barred spiral galaxy	Vela	10^{h} 29^{m} 01.4531^{s}	−44° 39′ 24.66″	11.2
3265		Elliptical galaxy	Leo Minor	10^{h} 31^{m} 06.8^{s}	+28° 47′ 47″	14.1
3266		Lenticular galaxy	Ursa Major	10^{h} 33^{m} 17.6011^{s}	+64° 44′ 57.858″	13.42
3267		Lenticular galaxy	Antlia	10^{h} 29^{m} 48.59^{s}	−35° 19′ 20.6″	11.7
3268		Elliptical galaxy	Antlia	10^{h} 30^{m} 00.655^{s}	−35° 19′ 31.83″	11.77
3269		Barred spiral galaxy or barred lenticular galaxy	Antlia	10^{h} 29^{m} 57.0404^{s}	−35° 13′ 27.833″	12.26
3271		Barred lenticular galaxy	Antlia	10^{h} 30^{m} 26.49^{s}	−35° 21′ 34.2″	11.73
3274		Spiral galaxy	Leo	10^{h} 32^{m} 17.281^{s}	+27° 40′ 07.59″	12.32
3277		Spiral galaxy	Leo	10^{h} 32^{m} 55.4506^{s}	+28° 30′ 42.409″	12.5
3278		Spiral galaxy	Antlia	10^{h} 31^{m} 35.4845^{s}	−39° 57′ 15.960″	13.01
3281		Unbarred spiral galaxy	Antlia	10^{h} 31^{m} 52.086^{s}	−34° 51′ 13.40″	12.6
3285		Barred spiral galaxy	Hydra	10^{h} 33^{m} 35.8^{s}	−27° 27′ 16″	13.05
3290	Arp 53	Spiral galaxy	Hydra	10^{h} 35^{m} 17^{s}	−17° 16′ 36″	
3293		Open cluster	Carina	10^{h} 35^{m} 48.8^{s}	−58° 13′ 00″	4.8
3294		Spiral galaxy	Leo Minor	10^{h} 36^{m} 16.255^{s}	+37° 19′ 29.02″	11.2
3300		Lenticular galaxy	Leo	10^{h} 36^{m} 38.43673^{s}	+14° 10′ 15.9950″	13.32

== 3301–3400 ==
NGC number	Other names	Object type	Constellation	Right ascension (J2000)	Declination (J2000)	Apparent magnitude
3301	NGC 3760	Lenticular galaxy	Leo	10^{h} 36^{m} 56.030^{s}	+21° 52′ 55.80″	11.09
3302		Lenticular galaxy	Antlia	10^{h} 35^{m} 47.417^{s}	−32° 21′ 30.76″	
3305		Elliptical galaxy	Hydra	10^{h} 36^{m} 11.7^{s}	−27° 09′ 44″	13.77
3307		Lenticular galaxy	Hydra	10^{h} 36^{m} 17.2^{s}	−27° 31′ 47″	14.49
3308		Lenticular galaxy	Hydra	10^{h} 36^{m} 22.4^{s}	−27° 26′ 17″	12.94
3309		Elliptical galaxy	Hydra	10^{h} 36^{m} 35.6766^{s}	−27° 31′ 05.788″	12.60
3310		Spiral galaxy	Ursa Major	10^{h} 38^{m} 45.9^{s}	+53° 30′ 12″	11.0
3311		Elliptical galaxy	Hydra	10^{h} 36^{m} 43.3^{s}	−27° 31′ 41″	13
3312		Spiral galaxy	Hydra	10^{h} 37^{m} 02.3^{s}	−27° 33′ 54″	12.7
3313		Barred spiral galaxy	Hydra	10^{h} 37^{m} 25.4^{s}	−25° 19′ 10″	12.38
3314		Spiral galaxy occulted by another spiral galaxy	Hydra	10^{h} 37^{m} 12.8^{s}	−27° 41′ 04″	13.1
3315		Lenticular galaxy	Hydra	10^{h} 37^{m} 19.2^{s}	−27° 11′ 32″	14.42
3316		Barred lenticular galaxy	Hydra	10^{h} 37^{m} 37.3^{s}	−27° 35′ 39″	13.64
3318		Barred spiral galaxy	Vela	10^{h} 37^{m} 15.5036^{s}	−41° 37′ 38.859″	12.19
3319		Barred spiral galaxy	Ursa Major	10^{h} 39^{m} 09^{s}	+41° 41′ 12″	11.07
3323		Barred spiral galaxy	Leo Minor	10^{h} 39^{m} 39.0224^{s}	+25° 19′ 21.838″	14.0g
3324		Open cluster	Carina	10^{h} 37^{m} 20^{s}	−58° 38′ 30″	
3336		Barred spiral galaxy	Hydra	10^{h} 40^{m} 17.0^{s}	−27° 46′ 37″	13.00
3338		Spiral galaxy	Leo	10^{h} 42^{m} 07.5197^{s}	+13° 44′ 49.380″	10.9
3341		Peculiar spiral galaxy	Sextans	10^{h} 42^{m} 31.49^{s}	+05° 02′ 38.08″	0.067
3344		Spiral galaxy	Leo Minor	10^{h} 43^{m} 31.1^{s}	+24° 55′ 20″	10.5
3351	Messier 95	Spiral galaxy	Leo	10^{h} 43^{m} 57.7^{s}	+11° 42′ 13″	11.2
3353		Intermediate spiral galaxy	Ursa Major	10^{h} 45^{m} 22.296^{s}	+55° 57′ 39.24″	12.8
3357		Elliptical galaxy	Leo	10^{h} 44^{m} 20.76^{s}	+14° 05′ 04.34″	13.0
3359		Spiral galaxy	Ursa Major	10^{h} 46^{m} 36.6^{s}	+63° 13′ 25″	11.0
3362		Intermediate spiral galaxy	Leo	10^{h} 44^{m} 51.7165^{s}	+06° 35′ 48.236″	12.8
3367		Barred spiral galaxy	Leo	10^{h} 46^{m} 35.0^{s}	+13° 45′ 03″	11.4
3368	Messier 96	Spiral galaxy	Leo	10^{h} 46^{m} 45.8^{s}	+11° 49′ 10″	10.0
3369		Lenticular galaxy	Hydra	10^{h} 46^{m} 44.9^{s}	−25° 14′ 34″	14.6
3370		Spiral galaxy	Leo	10^{h} 47^{m} 04.2^{s}	+17° 16′ 23″	12.4
3371	(Duplicate of NGC 3384)	Lenticular galaxy	Leo	10^{h} 48^{m} 16.9^{s}	+12° 37′ 43″	10.0
3372	Eta Carina Nebula; Keyhole Nebula	Diffuse nebula	Carina	10^{h} 44^{m} 19.0^{s}	−59° 53′ 21″	1.0
3377		Elliptical galaxy	Leo	10^{h} 47^{m} 42.4^{s}	+13° 59′ 08″	10.2
3379	Messier 105	Elliptical galaxy	Leo	10^{h} 47^{m} 49.8^{s}	+12° 34′ 55″	9.6
3382		Double star	Leo Minor	10^{h} 48^{m} 25.0^{s}	+36° 43′ 32″	
3384		Lenticular galaxy	Leo	10^{h} 48^{m} 16.9^{s}	+12° 37′ 43″	10.0
3389	NGC 3373	Spiral galaxy	Leo	10^{h} 48^{m} 27.9204^{s}	+12° 31′ 59.897″	12.3B
3393		Barred spiral galaxy	Hydra	10^{h} 48^{m} 23.5^{s}	−25° 09′ 43″	13.1
3395		Peculiar spiral galaxy	Leo Minor	10^{h} 49^{m} 50.1^{s}	+32° 58′ 58″	11.8
3396		Peculiar barred irregular galaxy	Leo Minor	10^{h} 49^{m} 55.1^{s}	+32° 59′ 27″	12.0

== 3401–3500 ==
NGC number	Other names	Object type	Constellation	Right ascension (J2000)	Declination (J2000)	Apparent magnitude
3402	NGC 3411	Elliptical galaxy	Hydra	10^{h} 50^{m} 26.104^{s}	−12° 50′ 42.26″	11.74
3408		Spiral galaxy	Ursa Major	10^{h} 52^{m} 11.6721^{s}	+58° 26′ 17.272″	14.3g
3411	(Duplicate of NGC 3402)	Elliptical galaxy	Hydra	10^{h} 50^{m} 26.104^{s}	−12° 50′ 42.26″	11.74
3412		Barred lenticular galaxy	Leo	10^{h} 50^{m} 53.3^{s}	+13° 24′ 43.7″	10.54
3414	Arp 162	Lenticular galaxy	Leo Minor	10^{h} 51^{m} 16.242^{s}	+27° 58′ 29.88″	11.09
3423		Spiral galaxy	Sextans	10^{h} 51^{m} 14.2926^{s}	+05° 50′ 24.190″	10.9
3426		Lenticular galaxy	Leo	10^{h} 51^{m} 45.75169^{s}	+18° 28′ 50.9424″	
3430		Barred spiral galaxy	Leo	10^{h} 52^{m} 11.4^{s}	+32° 57′ 01.6″	11.6
3432		Spiral galaxy	Leo Minor	10^{h} 52^{m} 31.132^{s}	+36° 37′ 07.60″	11.3
3435		Barred spiral galaxy	Ursa Major	10^{h} 54^{m} 48.3299^{s}	+61° 17′ 23.483″	13.2
3437		Barred spiral galaxy	Leo	10^{h} 52^{m} 35.7707^{s}	+22° 56′ 02.477″	11.6B
3443		Spiral galaxy	Leo	10^{h} 53^{m} 00.12^{s}	+17° 34′ 25.1″	13.1
3445		Magellanic spiral galaxy	Ursa Major	10^{h} 54^{m} 35.5^{s}	+56° 59′ 26″	12.3
3447		Barred Magellanic spiral galaxy	Leo	10^{h} 53^{m} 24^{s}	+16° 46′ 20″	14.3
3448		Irregular galaxy	Ursa Major	10^{h} 54^{m} 39.2^{s}	+54° 18′ 18″	11.6
3449		Spiral galaxy	Antlia	10^{h} 52^{m} 53.6609^{s}	−32° 55′ 39.202″	12.19
3455		Intermediate spiral galaxy	Leo	10^{h} 54^{m} 31.066^{s}	+17° 17′ 04.59″	13.1
3464		Barred spiral galaxy	Hydra	10^{h} 54^{m} 40^{s}	−21° 04′ 00″	12.4
3486		Spiral galaxy	Leo Minor	11^{h} 00^{m} 24.1^{s}	+28° 58′ 32″	11.2
3489		Lenticular galaxy	Leo	11^{h} 00^{m} 18.6^{s}	+13° 54′ 04″	10.2

== 3501–3600 ==
NGC number	Other names	Object type	Constellation	Right ascension (J2000)	Declination (J2000)	Apparent magnitude
3501		Spiral galaxy	Leo	11^{h} 02^{m} 47.307^{s}	+17° 59′ 22.31″	13.8
3504		Barred spiral galaxy	Leo Minor	11^{h} 03^{m} 11.2^{s}	+27° 58′ 21″	11.67
3506		Spiral galaxy	Leo	11^{h} 03^{m} 13.0^{s}	11° 04′ 36″	12.6
3507		Barred spiral galaxy	Leo	11^{h} 03^{m} 25.3705^{s}	+18° 08′ 07.703″	11.9
3509	Arp 335	Barred spiral galaxy	Leo	11^{h} 04^{m} 23.554^{s}	+04° 49′ 43.03″	13.53
3511		Intermediate spiral galaxy	Crater	11^{h} 03^{m} 23.8090^{s}	−23° 05′ 11.555″	10.8
3512		Intermediate spiral galaxy	Leo	11^{h} 04^{m} 02.9449^{s}	+28° 02′ 12.888″	12.98
3513		Barred spiral galaxy	Crater	11^{h} 03^{m} 46.1628^{s}	−23° 14′ 44.196″	11.1
3516		Barred lenticular galaxy	Ursa Major	11^{h} 06^{m} 47.5^{s}	+72° 34′ 07″	11.5
3518	(Duplicate of NGC 3110)	Spiral galaxy	Leo	10^{h} 04^{m} 01.9^{s}	−06° 28′ 29″	13.5
3521		Spiral galaxy	Leo	11^{h} 05^{m} 48.9^{s}	−00° 02′ 06″	10.1
3524		Lenticular galaxy	Leo	11^{h} 06^{m} 32.1048^{s}	+11° 23′ 07.507″	12.8
3527		Barred spiral galaxy	Ursa Major	11^{h} 07^{m} 18.1794^{s}	+28° 31′ 40.168″	14.5g
3532		Open cluster	Carina	11^{h} 05^{m} 33^{s}	−58° 44′	3.3
3535		Spiral galaxy	Leo	11^{h} 08^{m} 33.92^{s}	+04° 49′ 54.821″	13.5
3539		Lenticular galaxy	Ursa Major	11^{h} 09^{m} 08.8^{s}	+28° 40′ 21″	
3545		Elliptical galaxy	Ursa Major	11^{h} 10^{m} 12.7^{s}	+36° 57′ 56″	
3545B		Elliptical galaxy	Ursa Major	11^{h} 10^{m} 13.2^{s}	+36° 58′ 00″	
3550		Lenticular galaxy	Ursa Major	11^{h} 10^{m} 38.3^{s}	+28° 46′ 04″	13.22
3552		Lenticular galaxy	Ursa Major	11^{h} 10^{m} 42.8^{s}	+28° 41′ 25″	14.3
3553		Lenticular galaxy	Ursa Major	11^{h} 10^{m} 40.3^{s}	+28° 51′ 09″	15.3
3554		Elliptical galaxy	Ursa Major	11^{h} 10^{m} 47.8^{s}	+28° 39′ 38″	
3556	Messier 108	Spiral galaxy	Ursa Major	11^{h} 11^{m} 31.3^{s}	+55° 40′ 31″	10.7
3557		Elliptical galaxy	Centaurus	11^{h} 09^{m} 57.642^{s}	−37° 32′ 20.958″	10.4
3561	Arp 105	Pair of interacting galaxies	Ursa Major	11^{h} 11^{m} 13.2^{s}	+28° 41′ 47″	14.5
3568		Barred spiral galaxy	Centaurus	11^{h} 10^{m} 48.4926^{s}	−37° 26′ 51.601″	13.00
3576		Diffuse nebula	Carina	11^{h} 11^{m} 49.8^{s}	−61° 18′ 14″	
3583		Barred spiral galaxy	Ursa Major	11^{h} 14^{m} 10.9^{s}	48° 19′ 07″	11.2
3585		Elliptical or lenticular galaxy	Hydra	11^{h} 13^{m} 17.1^{s}	−26° 45′ 17″	9.9
3587	Messier 97; Owl Nebula	Planetary nebula	Ursa Major	11^{h} 14^{m} 47.7^{s}	+55° 01′ 09″	9.9
3593		Spiral galaxy	Leo	11^{h} 14^{m} 37.1^{s}	+12° 49′ 03″	11.8
3596		Spiral galaxy	Leo	11^{h} 15^{m} 06.3^{s}	+14° 47′ 12″	11.7
3597		Galaxy merger	Crater	11^{h} 14^{m} 41.97^{s}	−23° 43′ 39.58″	
3598		Lenticular galaxy	Leo	11^{h} 15^{m} 11.67^{s}	+17° 15′ 45.7″	
3599		Lenticular galaxy	Leo	11^{h} 15^{m} 26.949^{s}	+18° 06′ 37.43″	10.178

== 3601–3700 ==
NGC number	Other names	Object type	Constellation	Right ascension (J2000)	Declination (J2000)	Apparent magnitude
3602		Barred spiral galaxy	Leo	11^{h} 15^{m} 48.322^{s}	+17° 24′ 58.03″	
3603		Diffuse nebula	Carina	11^{h} 15^{m} 09.1^{s}	−61° 16′ 17″	10.1
3605		Elliptical galaxy	Leo	11^{h} 16^{m} 46.622^{s}	+18° 01′ 01.71″	12.15
3607		Lenticular galaxy	Leo	11^{h} 16^{m} 54.657^{s}	+18° 03′ 06.51″	10.8
3608		Elliptical galaxy	Leo	11^{h} 16^{m} 58.967^{s}	+18° 08′ 54.71″	10.76
3610		Elliptical galaxy	Ursa Major	11^{h} 18^{m} 25.276^{s}	+58° 47′ 10.49″	
3613		Elliptical galaxy	Ursa Major	11^{h} 18^{m} 36.130^{s}	+57° 59′ 59.73″	
3615		Elliptical galaxy	Leo	11^{h} 18^{m} 06.7^{s}	+23° 23′ 50″	12.8
3618		Spiral galaxy	Leo	11^{h} 18^{m} 32.6^{s}	+23° 28′ 09″	13.6
3619		Lenticular galaxy	Ursa Major	11^{h} 19^{m} 21.621^{s}	+57° 45′ 27.66″	
3621		Spiral galaxy	Hydra	11^{h} 18^{m} 16.8^{s}	−32° 48′ 49″	10.0
3623	Messier 65	Spiral galaxy	Leo	11^{h} 18^{m} 55.8^{s}	+13° 05′ 32″	9.6
3625		Intermediate spiral galaxy	Ursa Major	11^{h} 20^{m} 31.2936^{s}	+57° 46′ 53.526″	14.0g
3626	(Duplicate of NGC 3626)	Lenticular galaxy	Leo	11^{h} 20^{m} 03.794^{s}	+18° 21′ 24.45″	10.98
3627	Messier 66	Spiral galaxy	Leo	11^{h} 20^{m} 15.1^{s}	+12° 59′ 22″	8.9
3628		Spiral galaxy	Leo	11^{h} 20^{m} 16.9^{s}	+13° 35′ 14″	11.5
3629		Spiral galaxy	Leo	11^{h} 20^{m} 31.9^{s}	+26° 57′ 47″	12.9
3631		Spiral galaxy	Ursa Major	11^{h} 21^{m} 02.8753^{s}	+53° 10′ 11.038″	10.1
3632	Caldwell 40; NGC 3626	Lenticular galaxy	Leo	11^{h} 20^{m} 03.794^{s}	+18° 21′ 24.45″	10.98
3640		Ellptical galaxy	Leo	11^{h} 21^{m} 06.8^{s}	+03° 14′ 05″	10.3
3642		Spiral galaxy	Ursa Major	11^{h} 22^{m} 17.9^{s}	59° 04′ 28″	10.8
3646	NGC 3649	Ring galaxy	Leo	11^{h} 21^{m} 43^{s}	+20° 10′ 10″	11.13
3647		Elliptical galaxy	Leo	11^{h} 21^{m} 32.6^{s}	+02° 53′ 14″	15.6
3649	(Duplicate of NGC 3646)	Ring galaxy	Leo	11^{h} 21^{m} 43^{s}	+20° 10′ 10″	11.13
3656		Peculiar galaxy	Ursa Major	11^{h} 23^{m} 38.7^{s}	+53° 50′ 32″	12.3
3657		Peculiar spiral galaxy	Ursa Major	11^{h} 23^{m} 55.6^{s}	52° 55′ 15″	13.5
3664		Magellanic barred spiral galaxy	Leo	11^{h} 24^{m} 24.2^{s}	+03° 19′ 30″	12.6
3665		Lenticular galaxy	Ursa Major	11^{h} 24^{m} 43.7^{s}	+38° 45′ 46″	10.7
3666		Unbarred spiral galaxy	Leo	11^{h} 24^{m} 26^{s}	+11° 20′ 31″	12.5
3669		Barred spiral galaxy	Ursa Major	11^{h} 25^{m} 26.8^{s}	+57° 43′ 16.5″	12.4
3672		Unbarred spiral galaxy	Crater	11^{h} 25^{m} 02.4755^{s}	−09° 47′ 42.905″	11.4
3673		Barred spiral galaxy	Hydra	11^{h} 25^{m} 12.8697^{s}	−26° 44′ 12.110″	11.5
3675		Spiral galaxy	Ursa Major	11^{h} 26^{m} 08.5689^{s}	+43° 35′ 09.696″	10.0
3678		Spiral galaxy	Leo	11^{h} 26^{m} 15.70^{s}	+27° 52′ 01.00″	13.5
3681		Intermediate spiral galaxy	Leo	11^{h} 26^{m} 29.7943^{s}	+16° 51′ 48.360″	11.6
3684		Spiral galaxy	Leo	11^{h} 27^{m} 11.2201^{s}	+17° 01′ 48.518″	11.5
3686		Spiral galaxy	Leo	11^{h} 27^{m} 43.942^{s}	+17° 13′ 26.61″	11.43
3689		Intermediate spiral galaxy	Leo	11^{h} 28^{m} 11.0268^{s}	+25° 39′ 40.22″	12.3
3690		Interacting galaxies	Ursa Major	11^{h} 28^{m} 33.1^{s}	+58° 33′ 54″	11.8
3697		Spiral galaxy	Leo	11^{h} 28^{m} 50.380^{s}	+20° 47′ 42.61″	12.62

== 3701–3800 ==
NGC number	Other names	Object type	Constellation	Right ascension (J2000)	Declination (J2000)	Apparent magnitude
3705		Barred spiral galaxy	Leo	11^{h} 30^{m} 07^{s}	+09° 16′ 35″	11.07
3717		Spiral galaxy	Hydra	11^{h} 31^{m} 31.992^{s}	−30° 18′ 27.86″	
3718	Arp 214	Peculiar galaxy	Ursa Major	11^{h} 32^{m} 34.940^{s}	+53° 04′ 04.18″	10.61
3726		Barred spiral galaxy	Ursa Major	11^{h} 33^{m} 21.1^{s}	47° 01′ 45″	10.2
3729		Barred spiral galaxy	Ursa Major	11^{h} 33^{m} 49.3^{s}	53° 07′ 32″	11.0
3733		Intermediate spiral galaxy	Ursa Major	11^{h} 35^{m} 01.6481^{s}	+54° 51′ 02.122″	12.93
3735		Spiral galaxy	Draco	11^{h} 35^{m} 57.2586^{s}	+70° 32′ 07.774″	12.50
3738		Dwarf galaxy	Ursa Major	11^{h} 35^{m} 47.1^{s}	+54° 31′ 32″	12.04
3741		Irregular galaxy	Ursa Major	11^{h} 36^{m} 05^{s}	+45° 17′ 02″	14.23
3745		Lenticular galaxy	Leo	11^{h} 37^{m} 44.434^{s}	+22° 01′ 16.64″	15.2
3746		Barred spiral galaxy	Leo	11^{h} 37^{m} 43.6312^{s}	+22° 00′ 35.153″	15.01
3748		Lenticular galaxy	Leo	11^{h} 37^{m} 49.065^{s}	+22° 01′ 34.14″	14.8
3749		Spiral galaxy	Centaurus	11^{h} 35^{m} 53.203^{s}	−37° 59′ 50.39″	
3750		Barred lenticular galaxy	Leo	11^{h} 37^{m} 51.637^{s}	+21° 58′ 27.26″	13.9
3751		Lenticular galaxy	Leo	11^{h} 37^{m} 53.859^{s}	+21° 56′ 11.34″	14.3
3753		Barred spiral galaxy	Leo	11^{h} 37^{m} 53.90^{s}	+21° 58′ 53.0″	14.52
3754		Barred spiral galaxy	Leo	11^{h} 37^{m} 54.921^{s}	+21° 59′ 07.80″	14.3
3756		Intermediate spiral galaxy	Ursa Major	11^{h} 36^{m} 48.0146^{s}	+54° 17′ 36.930″	12.11
3758	Markarian 739	Spiral galaxy	toward Leo	11^{h} 36^{m} 29.10^{s}	+21° 35′ 46.0″	14.3
3760	(Duplicate of NGC 3301)	Lenticular galaxy	Leo	10^{h} 36^{m} 56.030^{s}	+21° 52′ 55.80″	11.09
3766		Open cluster	Centaurus	11^{h} 36^{m} 13.3^{s}	−61° 36′ 55″	5.7
3773		Lenticular galaxy	Leo	11^{h} 38^{m} 13.1^{s}	+12° 06′ 43″	13.1
3776		Spiral galaxy	Virgo	11^{h} 38^{m} 17.98^{s}	−03° 21′ 15.8″	16.0
3780		Spiral galaxy	Ursa Major	11^{h} 39^{m} 22.3603^{s}	+56° 16′ 14.452″	12.16
3783		Barred spiral galaxy	Centaurus	11^{h} 39^{m} 01.721^{s}	–37° 44′ 18.60″	13.43
3786		Spiral galaxy	Ursa Major	11^{h} 39^{m} 42.512^{s}	+31° 54′ 33.97″	13.74
3794	NGC 3804	Low surface brightness galaxy	Ursa Major	11^{h} 40^{m} 53.42^{s}	+56° 12′ 07.3″	13.01
3799		Barred spiral galaxy	Leo	11^{h} 40^{m} 09.4219^{s}	15° 19′ 38.434″	13.9
3800		Intermediate spiral galaxy	Leo	11^{h} 40^{m} 13.4775^{s}	15° 20′ 31.884″	12.7

== 3801–3900 ==
NGC number	Other names	Object type	Constellation	Right ascension (J2000)	Declination (J2000)	Apparent magnitude
3801		Lenticular galaxy	Leo	11^{h} 40^{m} 16.9^{s}	+17° 43′ 41″	12.0
3804	(Duplicate of NGC 3794)	Low surface brightness galaxy	Ursa Major	11^{h} 40^{m} 53.42^{s}	+56° 12′ 07.3″	13.01
3805		Lenticular galaxy	Leo	11^{h} 40^{m} 41.7^{s}	20° 20′ 35″	13.65
3806		Intermediate spiral galaxy	Leo	11^{h} 40^{m} 46.6976^{s}	+17° 47′ 44.959″	13.6
3808A		Interacting galaxy	Leo	11^{h} 40^{m} 44.2^{s}	+22° 25′ 46″	14.1
3808B		Interacting galaxy	Leo	11^{h} 40^{m} 44.5^{s}	+22° 26′ 48″	15
3810		Spiral galaxy	Leo	11^{h} 40^{m} 58.7659^{s}	+11° 28′ 16.371″	10.6
3811		Barred spiral galaxy	Ursa Major	11^{h} 41^{m} 16.6161^{s}	+47° 41′ 26.887″	12.9
3816		Lenticular galaxy	Leo	11^{h} 41^{m} 48.0^{s}	20° 06′ 13″	13.46
3817		Barred spiral galaxy	Virgo	11^{h} 41^{m} 52.9487^{s}	+10° 18′ 15.7838″	14.4
3818		Elliptical galaxy	Virgo	11^{h} 41^{m} 57.35927^{s}	−06° 09′ 20.4484″	
3821		Spiral galaxy; ring galaxy	Leo	11^{h} 42^{m} 09.1^{s}	20° 18′ 56″	13.7
3833		Barred spiral galaxy	Virgo	11^{h} 43^{m} 28.9^{s}	+10° 09′ 41″	13.5
3836		Spiral galaxy	Crater	11^{h} 43^{m} 29.7872^{s}	−16° 47′ 45.244″	13.5
3837		Elliptical galaxy	Leo	11^{h} 43^{m} 56.4^{s}	19° 53′ 40″	14.25
3840		Spiral galaxy	Leo	11^{h} 43^{m} 58.9^{s}	20° 04′ 37″	14.54
3841		Elliptical or lenticular galaxy	Leo	11^{h} 44^{m} 02.1^{s}	19° 58′ 19″	14.59
3842		Elliptical galaxy	Leo	11^{h} 44^{m} 02.1^{s}	+19° 56′ 59″	12.5
3843		Lenticular galaxy	Virgo	11^{h} 43^{m} 54.6^{s}	+07° 55′ 34″	13.5
3844		Lenticular galaxy	Leo	11^{h} 44^{m} 00.8^{s}	20° 01′ 46″	14.85
3845		Barred lenticular galaxy	Leo	11^{h} 44^{m} 05.4^{s}	19° 59′ 46″	15.01
3848		Lenticular galaxy	Virgo	11^{h} 42^{m} 11.1^{s}	+10° 16′ 41″	13.1
3851		Elliptical or lenticular galaxy	Leo	11^{h} 44^{m} 20.4^{s}	19° 58′ 51″	15.1
3857		Lenticular galaxy	Leo	11^{h} 44^{m} 50.1^{s}	+19° 31′ 58″	15.1
3859		Spiral galaxy	Leo	11^{h} 44^{m} 52.2^{s}	+19° 27′ 15″	14.8
3860		Spiral galaxy	Leo	11^{h} 44^{m} 49.1835^{s}	+19° 47′ 42.155″	14.22
3861		Barred spiral galaxy	Leo	11^{h} 45^{m} 03.9^{s}	19° 58′ 25″	13.7
3862		Elliptical galaxy	Leo	11^{h} 44^{m} 05.0^{s}	+19° 36′ 23″	14
3864		Spiral galaxy	Leo	11^{h} 45^{m} 15.7^{s}	+19° 23′ 32″	15.1
3867		Spiral galaxy	Leo	11^{h} 45^{m} 29.6^{s}	+19° 24′ 01″	14.2
3868		Lenticular galaxy	Leo	11^{h} 45^{m} 29.9^{s}	+19° 26′ 41″	15.3
3873		Elliptical galaxy	Leo	11^{h} 45^{m} 46.1^{s}	19° 46′ 26″	13.85
3875		Lenticular galaxy	Leo	11^{h} 45^{m} 49.4^{s}	19° 46′ 03″	14.9
3877		Spiral galaxy	Ursa Major	11^{h} 46^{m} 07.8^{s}	+47° 29′ 41″	11.8
3883		Low surface brightness spiral galaxy	Leo	11^{h} 46^{m} 47.2^{s}	20° 40′ 32″	13.40
3884		Spiral galaxy	Leo	11^{h} 46^{m} 12.2^{s}	20° 23′ 30″	13.5
3886		Lenticular galaxy	Leo	11^{h} 47^{m} 05.6^{s}	19° 50′ 14″	14.11
3887		Barred spiral galaxy	Crater	11^{h} 47^{m} 04.5920^{s}	−16° 51′ 16.210″	10.6
3888		Intermediate spiral galaxy	Ursa Major	11^{h} 47^{m} 34.3762^{s}	+55° 58′ 01.664″	12.7g
3891		Spiral galaxy	Ursa Major	11^{h} 48^{m} 03.3648^{s}	+30° 21′ 33.621″	13.3g
3893		Spiral galaxy	Ursa Major	11^{h} 48^{m} 38.2^{s}	48° 42′ 39″	10.2
3898		Spiral galaxy	Ursa Major	11^{h} 49^{m} 15.370^{s}	+56° 05′ 03.66″	10.7
3900		Lenticular galaxy	Leo	11^{h} 49^{m} 09.45631^{s}	+27° 01′ 19.2764″	11.44

== 3901–4000 ==
NGC number	Other names	Object type	Constellation	Right ascension (J2000)	Declination (J2000)	Apparent magnitude
3902		Intermediate spiral galaxy	Leo	11^{h} 49^{m} 18.746^{s}	+26° 07′ 17.50″	13.99
3904		Elliptical galaxy	Hydra	11^{h} 49^{m} 13.2^{s}	−29° 16′ 36″	10.96
3905		Barred spiral galaxy	Crater	11^{h} 49^{m} 04.9143^{s}	−09° 43′ 47.784″	12.9B
3908		Elliptical galaxy	Leo	11^{h} 49^{m} 52.68^{s}	+12° 11′ 09.30″	15.0
3910		Lenticular galaxy	Leo	11^{h} 49^{m} 59.3^{s}	21° 20′ 01″	13.83
3913		Spiral galaxy	Ursa Major	11^{h} 50^{m} 38.9222^{s}	+55° 21′ 13.942″	12.6
3914		Barred spiral galaxy	Virgo	11^{h} 50^{m} 32.6461^{s}	+06° 34′ 03.26″	13.2
3916		Spiral galaxy	Ursa Major	11^{h} 50^{m} 51.0192^{s}	+55° 08′ 37.290″	14.2g
3918		Planetary nebula	Centaurus	11^{h} 50^{m} 17.7^{s}	−57° 10′ 57″	10.0
3921		Interacting galaxy	Ursa Major	11^{h} 51^{m} 06.863^{s}	+55° 04′ 43.38″	12.64
3923		Elliptical galaxy	Hydra	11^{h} 51^{m} 01.7118^{s}	−28° 48′ 21.386″	9.6
3925		Barred lenticular galaxy, ring galaxy	Leo	11^{h} 51^{m} 20.9^{s}	21° 53′ 21″	15.3
3928		Lenticular galaxy or dwarf spiral galaxy	Ursa Major	11^{h} 51^{m} 47^{s}	+48° 40′ 59″	13.1
3929		Elliptical or lenticular galaxy	Leo	11^{h} 51^{m} 42.5^{s}	21° 00′ 10″	14.7
3936		Barred spiral galaxy	Hydra	11^{h} 52^{m} 20.59^{s}	−26° 54′ 21.2″	12.1
3937		Elliptical or lenticular galaxy	Leo	11^{h} 52^{m} 42.6^{s}	20° 37′ 53″	13.43
3938		Spiral galaxy	Ursa Major	11^{h} 52^{m} 49.5^{s}	+44° 07′ 13″	11.0
3940		Elliptical galaxy	Leo	11^{h} 52^{m} 46.4^{s}	+20° 59′ 21″	13.8
3941		Barred lenticular galaxy	Ursa Major	11^{h} 52^{m} 55.4^{s}	+36° 59′ 11″	10.3
3943		Barred lenticular galaxy	Leo	11^{h} 52^{m} 56.6^{s}	+20° 28′ 45″	14.29
3944		Elliptical galaxy	Leo	11^{h} 53^{m} 05.1^{s}	+26° 12′ 25″	12.9
3945		Barred lenticular galaxy	Ursa Major	11^{h} 53^{m} 13.726^{s}	+60° 40′ 32.02″	10.75
3947		Barred spiral galaxy	Leo	11^{h} 53^{m} 20.3208^{s}	+20° 45′ 06.184″	13.2
3949		Spiral galaxy	Ursa Major	11^{h} 53^{m} 41.9^{s}	+47° 51′ 29″	10.9
3950		Elliptical galaxy	Ursa Major	11^{h} 53^{m} 41.41^{s}	+47° 53′ 04.46″	15.7
3951		Spiral galaxy	Leo	11^{h} 53^{m} 41.2^{s}	23° 22′ 56″	14.0
3953		Spiral galaxy	Ursa Major	11^{h} 53^{m} 49.1^{s}	+52° 19′ 37″	10.8
3954		Elliptical galaxy	Leo	11^{h} 53^{m} 41.66824^{s}	+20° 52′ 56.9871″	14.65
3955		Lenticular galaxy	Crater	11^{h} 53^{m} 57.1556^{s}	−23° 09′ 50.891″	12.89
3961		Barred spiral galaxy	Draco	11^{h} 54^{m} 57.6265^{s}	+69° 19′ 48.395″	14.40
3971	NGC 3984	Lenticular galaxy	Ursa Major	11^{h} 55^{m} 36.4^{s}	29° 59′ 45″	13.7
3974		Lenticular galaxy	Crater	11^{h} 55^{m} 40.14^{s}	−12° 01′ 38.8″	13.4
3977	NGC 3980	Spiral galaxy	Ursa Major	11^{h} 56^{m} 07.1952^{s}	+55° 23′ 26.718″	13.4
3978		Intermediate spiral galaxy	Ursa Major	11^{h} 56^{m} 10.3326^{s}	+60° 31′ 20.969″	13.4
3980	(Duplicate of NGC 3977)	Spiral galaxy	Ursa Major	11^{h} 56^{m} 07.1952^{s}	+55° 23′ 26.718″	13.4
3981		Unbarred spiral galaxy	Crater	11^{h} 56^{m} 07.4^{s}	−19° 53′ 46″	
3982		Spiral galaxy	Ursa Major	11^{h} 56^{m} 28.3^{s}	+55° 07′ 29″	11.6
3984	(Duplicate of NGC 3971)	Lenticular galaxy	Ursa Major	11^{h} 55^{m} 36.4^{s}	29° 59′ 45″	13.7
3985		Barred spiral galaxy	Ursa Major	11^{h} 56^{m} 42.08^{s}	+48° 20′ 02.1″	12.6
3987		Spiral galaxy	Leo	11^{h} 57^{m} 20.9684^{s}	+25° 11′ 42.874″	12.9
3992	Messier 109	Spiral galaxy	Ursa Major	11^{h} 57^{m} 35.9^{s}	+53° 22′ 35″	10.7
3994		Unbarred spiral galaxy	Ursa Major	11^{h} 57^{m} 36.9^{s}	+32° 16′ 40″	12.7
3995		Magellanic spiral galaxy	Ursa Major	11^{h} 57^{m} 44.1^{s}	+32° 17′ 39″	12.1
3997		Barred spiral galaxy	Leo	11^{h} 57^{m} 48.2299^{s}	+25° 16′ 14.268″	14.02
3998		Lenticular galaxy	Ursa Major	11^{h} 57^{m} 56.1333^{s}	+55° 27′ 12.922″	12.10
3999		Lenticular galaxy	Leo	11^{h} 57^{m} 56.5^{s}	+25° 04′ 05″	15.7

== See also ==
- Lists of astronomical objects
