= NGC 3524 =

Galaxy in the constellation Leo

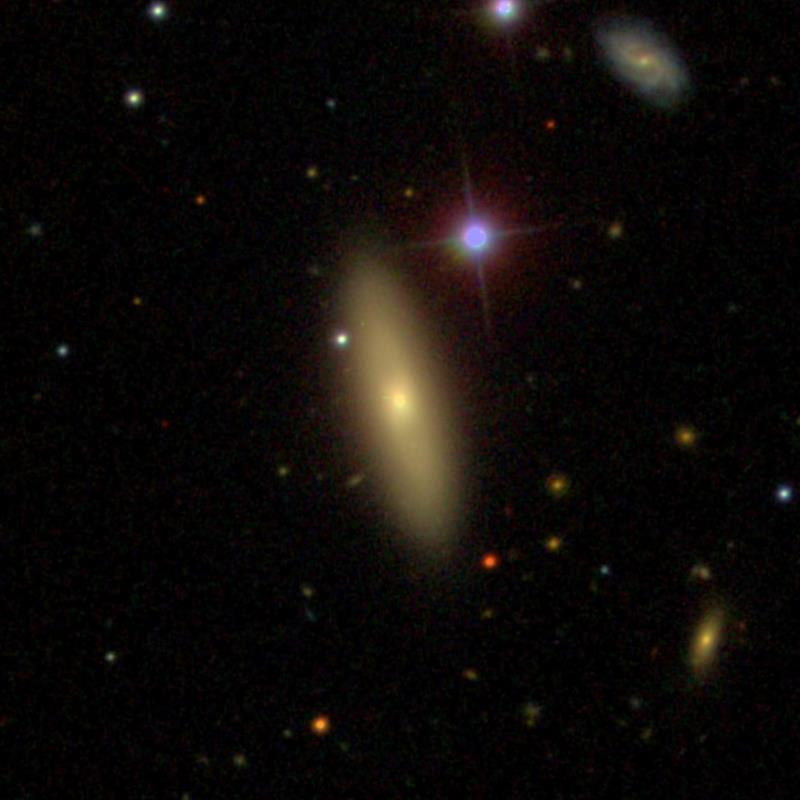
- NGC 3524 imaged by SDSS

Observation data (J2000 epoch)
- Constellation: Leo
- Right ascension: 11^{h} 06^{m} 32.1135^{s}
- Declination: +11° 23′ 07.693″
- Redshift: 0.004528
- Heliocentric radial velocity: 1357 ± 2 km/s
- Distance: 82.2 ± 5.9 Mly (25.21 ± 1.80 Mpc)
- Apparent magnitude (V): 12.8

Characteristics
- Type: S0/a
- Size: ~51,600 ly (15.81 kpc) (estimated)
- Apparent size (V): 1.6′ × 0.5′

Other designations
- IRAS 22409+3344, 2MASX J11063210+1123070, UGC 6158, MCG +02-28-050, PGC 33604, CGCG 066-112

NGC 3524 is a lenticular galaxy in the constellation of Leo. Its velocity with respect to the cosmic microwave background is 1709 ± 25 km/s, which corresponds to a Hubble distance of 25.21 ± 1.80 Mpc (~82.2 million light-years). It was discovered by German-British astronomer William Herschel on 11 March 1784.

== Supernova ==
One supernova has been observed in NGC 3524:

- SN 2024inv (Type Ia, mag. 18.3072) was discovered by Automatic Learning for the Rapid Classification of Events (ALeRCE) on 10 May 2024. This supernova got as bright as magnitude 12.1, making it the second-brightest observed in the year 2024.

== See also ==
- List of NGC objects (3001–4000)
