= NGC 3316 =

Barred lenticular galaxy in the constellation Hydra

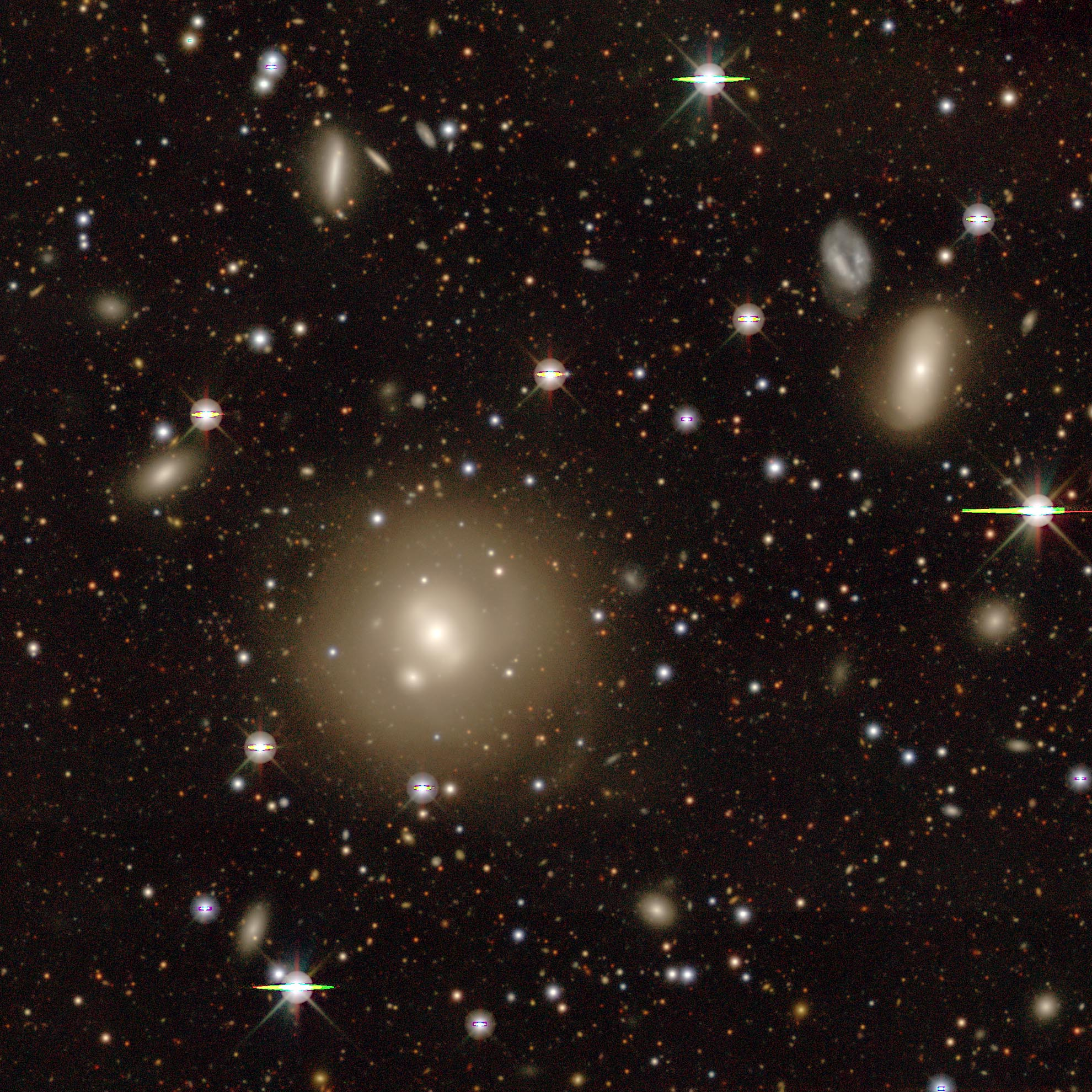
- Legacy Surveys image of NGC 3316 (large galaxy)

Observation data (J2000 epoch)
- Constellation: Hydra
- Right ascension: 10^{h} 37^{m} 37.3^{s}
- Declination: −27° 35′ 39″
- Redshift: 0.013142
- Heliocentric radial velocity: 3940 km/s
- Distance: 191 Mly (58.5 Mpc)
- Group or cluster: Hydra Cluster
- Apparent magnitude (V): 13.64

Characteristics
- Type: SB(rs)0^0
- Size: ~79,700 ly (24.43 kpc) (estimated)
- Apparent size (V): 1.3 x 1.1

Other designations
- ESO 501-54, MCG -04-25-046, PGC 031571

NGC 3316 is a barred lenticular galaxy located about 190 million light-years away in the constellation Hydra. The galaxy was discovered by astronomer John Herschel on March 26, 1835. NGC 3316 is a member of the Hydra Cluster, and appears to have a small companion galaxy known as HCC 15.

== See also ==
- List of NGC objects (3001–4000)
