= NGC 3864 =

Spiral galaxy in the constellation Leo

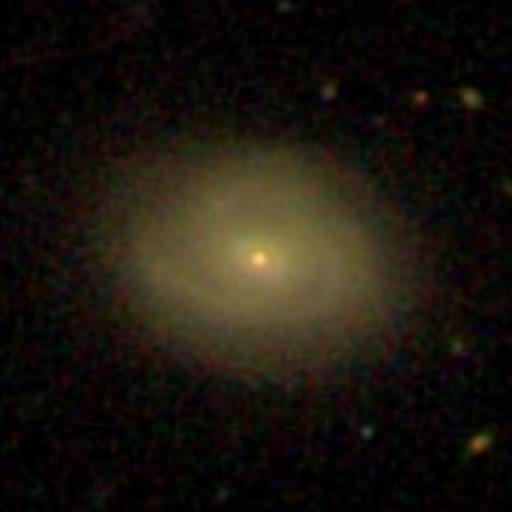
- SDSS image of NGC 3864.

Observation data (J2000 epoch)
- Constellation: Leo
- Right ascension: 11^{h} 45^{m} 15.7^{s}
- Declination: +19° 23′ 32″
- Redshift: 0.023339
- Heliocentric radial velocity: 6997 km/s
- Distance: 330 Mly (100 Mpc)
- Group or cluster: Leo Cluster
- Apparent magnitude (V): 15.08

Characteristics
- Type: Sa
- Size: ~85,000 ly (26.2 kpc) (estimated)
- Apparent size (V): 0.9 x 0.7

Other designations
- MCG +03-30-097, PGC 36620, CGCG 97-130

NGC 3864 is a spiral galaxy located about 330 million light-years away in the constellation Leo. The galaxy was discovered by astronomer Édouard Stephan on March 23, 1884. It is a member of the Leo Cluster.

== See also ==
- List of NGC objects (3001–4000)
