= NGC 3902 =

Spiral galaxy in the constellation Leo

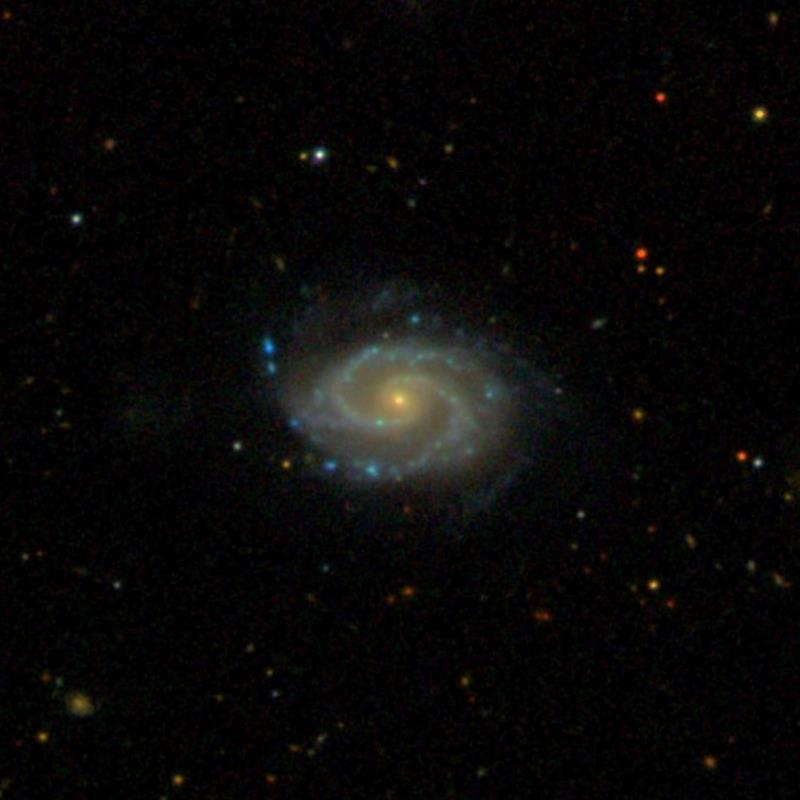
- SDSS image of NGC 3902

Observation data (J2000 epoch)
- Constellation: Leo
- Right ascension: 11^{h} 49^{m} 18.746^{s}
- Declination: +26° 07′ 17.50″
- Redshift: 0.01199
- Heliocentric radial velocity: 3573 km/s
- Distance: 188.6 Mly (57.81 Mpc)
- Apparent magnitude (B): 13.99

Characteristics
- Type: SAB(s)bc:

Other designations
- UGC 6790, MCG +04-28-055, PGC 36923

NGC 3902 is an intermediate spiral galaxy in the constellation Leo. It was discovered on April 6, 1785, by William Herschel and observed on February 19, 1827, by John Herschel. It is estimated to be 180 to 185 million light-years away, and its redshift-independent distance estimates to about 185 to 240 million light-years. It is around 75,000 light-years in diameter.

NGC 3902 is one galaxy within the NGC 3902 group (or LGG 254), a group of galaxies in Leo; the other galaxies of which are NGC 3920, NGC 3944, UGC 6806 and UGC 6807.
