= NGC 3914 =

Galaxy in the constellation Virgo

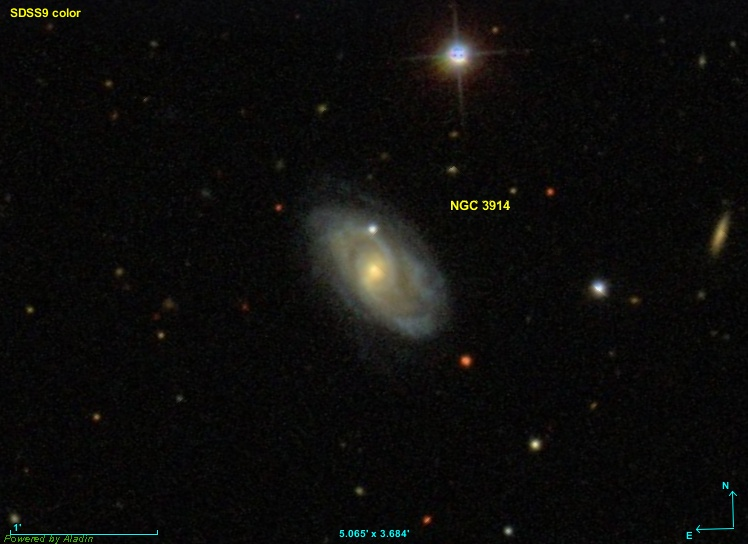
- NGC 3914 imaged by SDSS

Observation data (J2000 epoch)
- Constellation: Virgo
- Right ascension: 11^{h} 50^{m} 32.6406^{s}
- Declination: +06° 34′ 03.285″
- Redshift: 0.020384
- Heliocentric radial velocity: 6111 ± 3 km/s
- Distance: 311.1 ± 21.8 Mly (95.38 ± 6.69 Mpc)
- Apparent magnitude (V): 13.2

Characteristics
- Type: (R')SB(rs)b
- Size: ~103,000 ly (31.59 kpc) (estimated)
- Apparent size (V): 1.1′ × 0.6′

Other designations
- IRAS 11479+0650, 2MASX J11503264+0634030, UGC 6809, MCG +01-30-017, PGC 37014, CGCG 040-050

NGC 3914 is a barred spiral galaxy in the constellation of Virgo. Its velocity with respect to the cosmic microwave background is 6466 ± 25 km/s, which corresponds to a Hubble distance of 95.38 ± 6.69 Mpc (~311 million light-years). However, six non-redshift measurements give a distance of 81.2 ± 2.8 Mpc (~265 million light-years). The galaxy was discovered by German-British astronomer William Herschel on 13 April 1784.

The SIMBAD database lists NGC 3914 as a radio galaxy.

One supernova has been observed in NGC 3914: SN 2023fnj (Type Ia, mag. 18.679) was discovered by ATLAS on 14 April 2023.

== See also ==
- List of NGC objects (3001–4000)
