= NGC 3266 =

Galaxy in the constellation Ursa Major

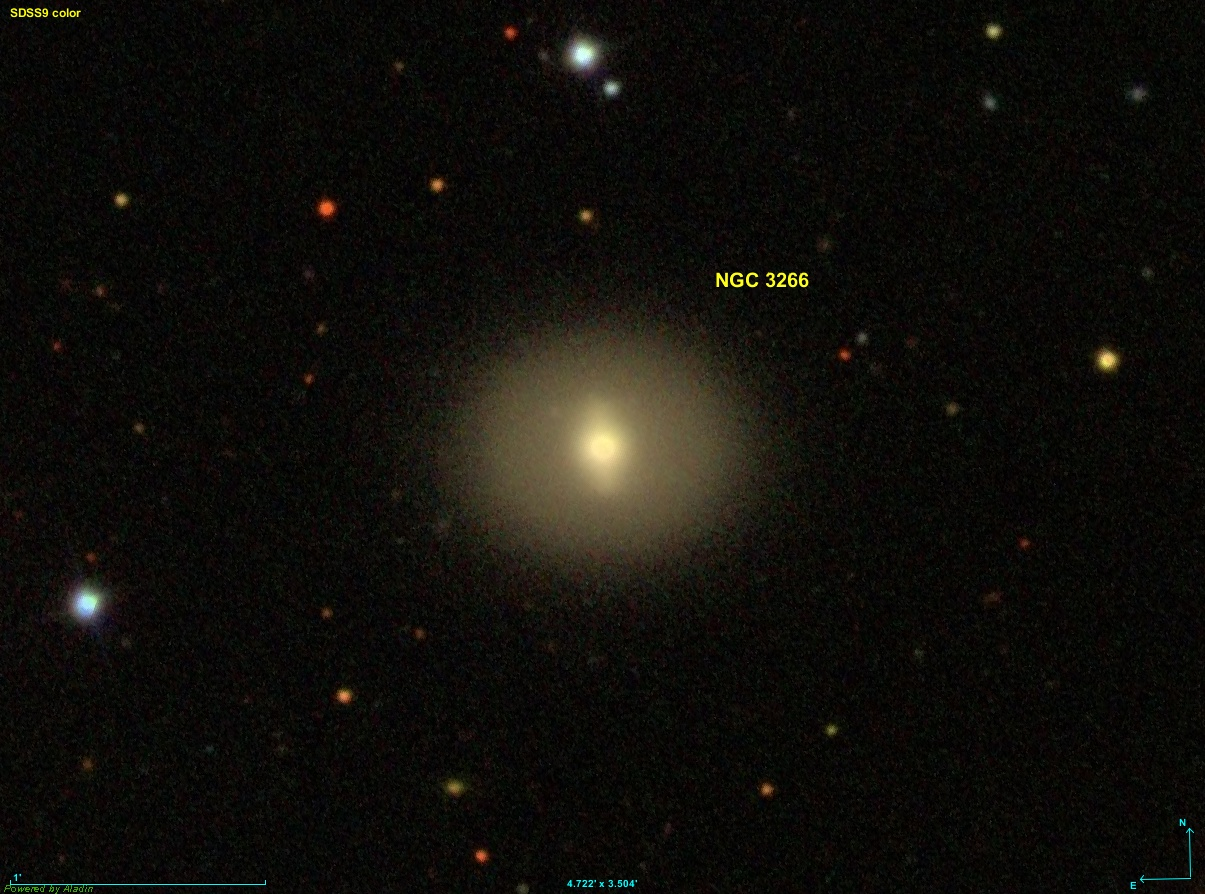
- NGC 3266 imaged by SDSS

Observation data (J2000 epoch)
- Constellation: Ursa Major
- Right ascension: 10^{h} 33^{m} 17.6011^{s}
- Declination: +64° 44′ 57.858″
- Redshift: 0.005887±0.0000400
- Heliocentric radial velocity: 1,765±12 km/s
- Distance: 90.4 ± 6.4 Mly (27.71 ± 1.96 Mpc)
- Apparent magnitude (V): 13.42

Characteristics
- Type: SAB0^{0}
- Size: ~50,300 ly (15.43 kpc) (estimated)
- Apparent size (V): 1.5′ × 1.3′

Other designations
- 2MASX J10331762+6444578, UGC 5725, MCG +11-13-030, PGC 31198, CGCG 313-022

NGC 3266 is a lenticular galaxy in the constellation of Ursa Major. Its velocity with respect to the cosmic microwave background is 1,879±14 km/s, which corresponds to a Hubble distance of 90.4 ± 6.4 Mly (27.71 ± 1.96 Mpc). It was discovered by German-British astronomer William Herschel on 3 April 1791.

NGC 3266 has a possible active galactic nucleus, i.e. it has a compact region at the center of a galaxy that emits a significant amount of energy across the electromagnetic spectrum, with characteristics indicating that this luminosity is not produced by the stars.

== Pair of galaxies ==
According to a study by Abraham Mahtessian in 1988, NGC 3266 and NGC 3259 form a pair of galaxies.

== Supernova ==
One supernova has been observed in NGC 3266:

- SN 1950M (type unknown, mag. 14.5) was discovered by Deutsch on 19 March 1950.

== See also ==
- List of NGC objects (3001–4000)
