= NGC 3285 =

Galaxy in the constellation Hydra

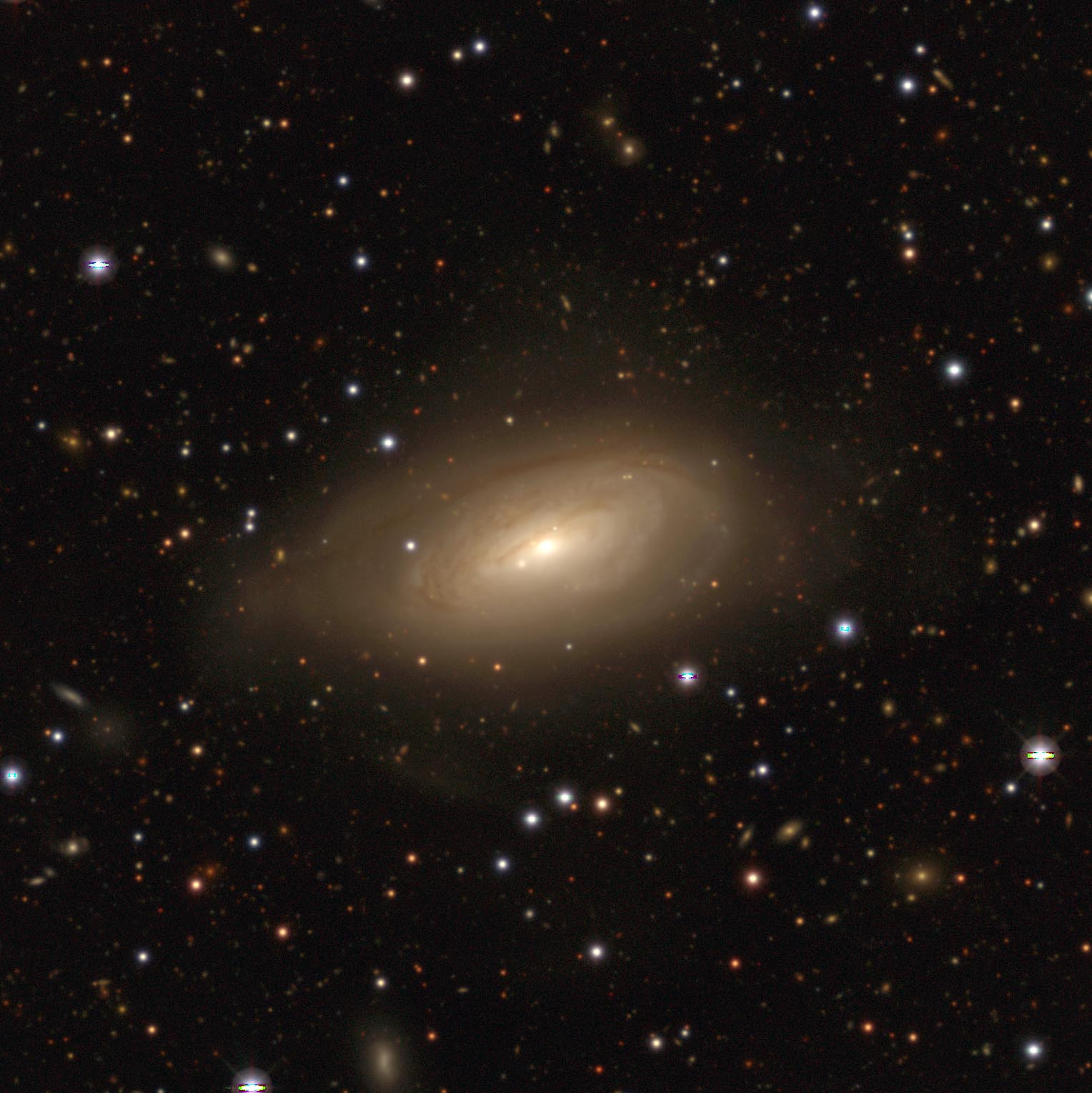
- Image of NGC 3285 by legacy surveys.

Observation data (J2000 epoch)
- Constellation: Hydra
- Right ascension: 10^{h} 33^{m} 35.8^{s}
- Declination: −27° 27′ 16″
- Redshift: 0.011268
- Heliocentric radial velocity: 3378 km/s
- Distance: 200 Mly (61.3 Mpc)
- Group or cluster: Hydra Cluster
- Apparent magnitude (V): 13.05

Characteristics
- Type: SB(s)a pec
- Size: ~171,100 ly (52.46 kpc) (estimated)
- Apparent size (V): 2.6 x 1.5

Other designations
- ESO 501-15, AM 1031-271, IRAS 10312-2711, MCG -4-25-19, PGC 31217

NGC 3285 is a barred spiral galaxy located about 200 million light-years away in the constellation Hydra. The galaxy was discovered by astronomer John Herschel on March 24, 1835. NGC 3285 is a member of the Hydra Cluster.

== See also ==
- List of NGC objects (3001–4000)
