= NGC 3961 =

Galaxy in the constellation Draco

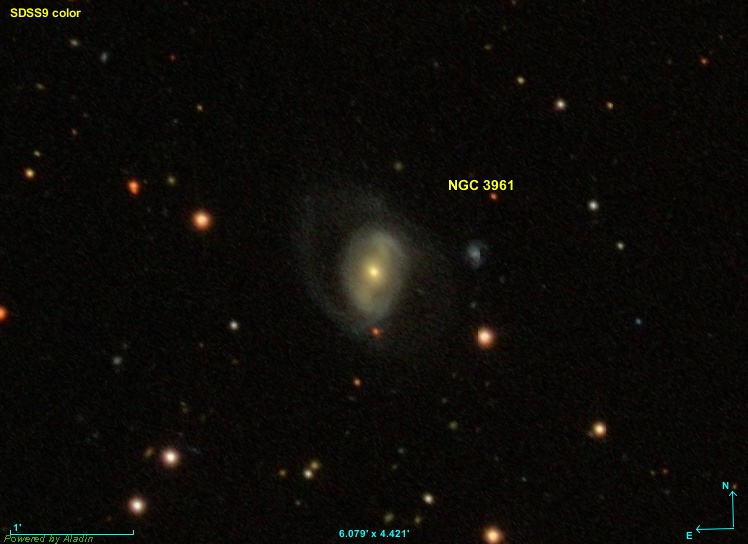
- NGC 3961 imaged by SDSS

Observation data (J2000 epoch)
- Constellation: Draco
- Right ascension: 11^{h} 54^{m} 57.6265^{s}
- Declination: +69° 19′ 48.395″
- Redshift: 0.022422±0.0000140
- Heliocentric radial velocity: 6,722±4 km/s
- Distance: 327.5 ± 22.9 Mly (100.41 ± 7.03 Mpc)
- Group or cluster: [TKK2018] 3925
- Apparent magnitude (V): 14.40

Characteristics
- Type: (R)SB(r)a
- Size: ~143,600 ly (44.02 kpc) (estimated)
- Apparent size (V): 1.3′ × 1.3′

Other designations
- 2MASX J11545766+6919484, UGC 6885, PGC 37390, CGCG 334-055

NGC 3961 is a barred spiral galaxy in the constellation of Draco. Its velocity with respect to the cosmic microwave background is 6,807±7 km/s, which corresponds to a Hubble distance of 327.5 ± 22.9 Mly (100.41 ± 7.03 Mpc). It was discovered by German-British astronomer William Herschel on 7 April 1793.

== Pair of galaxies ==
NGC 3961 and UGC 6844 form a pair of galaxies.

== Supernova ==
One supernova has been observed in NGC 3961:

- SN 2026fsf (Type II, mag. 17.46) was discovered by Yaozhang Ou, Jiashuo Zhang, Ezhar Elijan, et al. as part of the Xingming Observatory Sky Survey (XOSS) on 15 March 2026.

== See also ==
- List of NGC objects (3001–4000)
