= NGC 3535 =

Galaxy in the constellation Leo

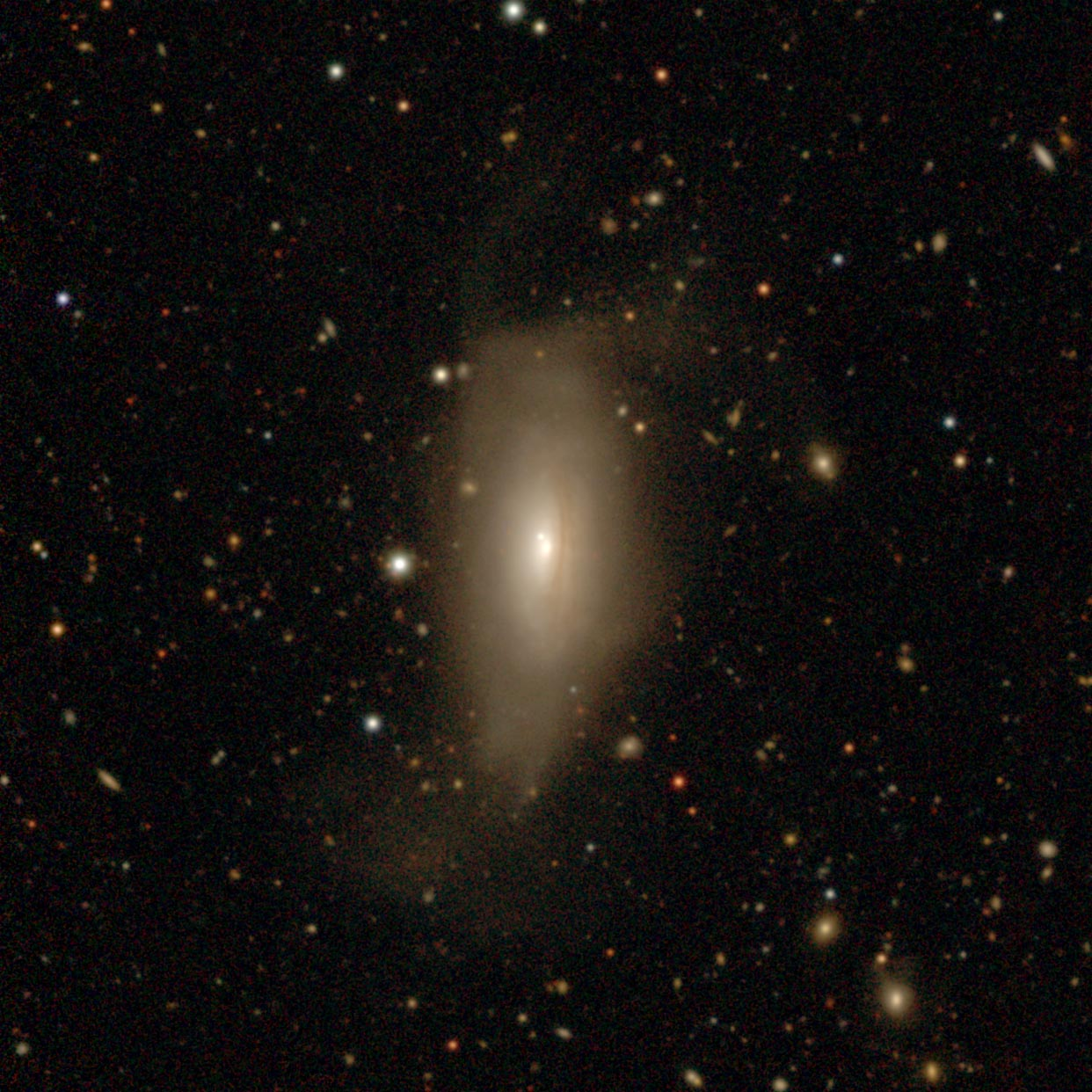
- NGC 3535 imaged by Legacy Surveys

Observation data (J2000 epoch)
- Constellation: Leo
- Right ascension: 11^{h} 08^{m} 33.9105^{s}
- Declination: +04° 49′ 54.781″
- Redshift: 0.023103
- Heliocentric radial velocity: 6926 ± 2 km/s
- Distance: 350.7 ± 24.6 Mly (107.51 ± 7.54 Mpc)
- Apparent magnitude (V): 13.5

Characteristics
- Type: SA(s)a pec?
- Size: ~162,300 ly (49.77 kpc) (estimated)
- Apparent size (V): 1.7′ × 0.8′

Other designations
- IRAS 11059+0505, 2MASX J11083390+0449545, UGC 6189, MCG +01-29-004, PGC 33760, CGCG 039-010

NGC 3535 is an unbarred spiral galaxy in the constellation of Leo. Its velocity with respect to the cosmic microwave background is 7,289±25 km/s, which corresponds to a Hubble distance of 350.7 ± 24.6 Mly (107.51 ± 7.54 Mpc). It was discovered by German-British astronomer William Herschel on 18 April 1784.

According to the SIMBAD database, NGC 3535 is a radio galaxy, i.e. it has giant regions of radio emission extending well beyond its visible structure.

== Supernova ==
One supernova has been observed in NGC 3535: SN 2023hrn (Type Ia, mag. 18.4) was discovered by ATLAS on 8 May 2023.

== See also ==
- List of NGC objects (3001–4000)
