= NGC 3359 =

Galaxy in the constellation Ursa Major

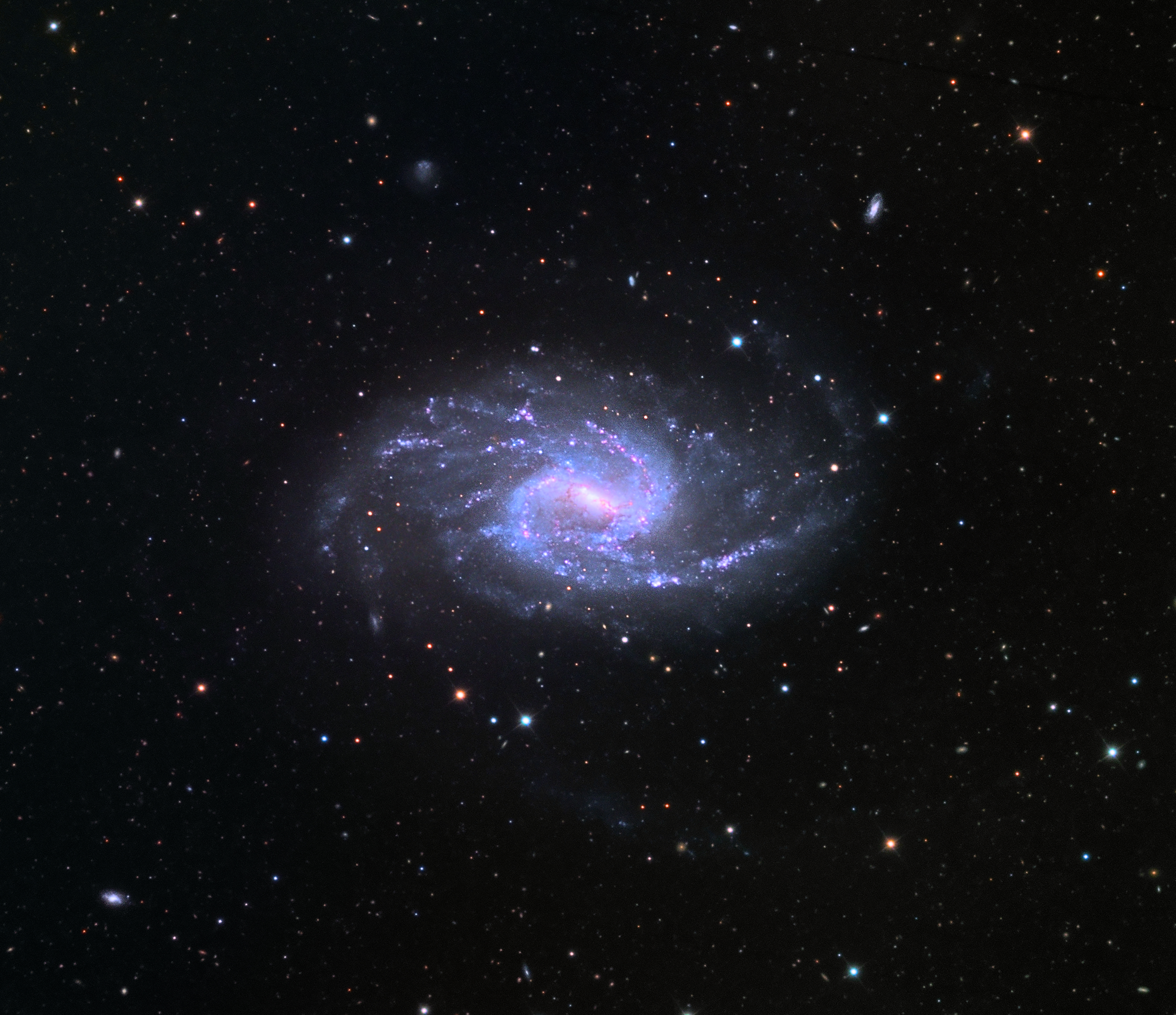
- NGC 3359

Observation data (J2000 epoch)
- Constellation: Ursa Major
- Right ascension: 10^{h} 46^{m} 36.845^{s}
- Declination: +63° 13′ 25.10″
- Redshift: 0.003373
- Heliocentric radial velocity: 1009 ± 5 km/s
- Distance: 59 Mly (18 Mpc)
- Apparent magnitude (V): 10.57
- Apparent magnitude (B): 11.03

Characteristics
- Type: SB(rs)c

Other designations
- UGC 5873, MCG +11-13-037, PGC 32183

NGC 3359 is a barred spiral galaxy located 59 million light-years from Earth, in the constellation of Ursa Major. It was discovered on November 28, 1793, by the astronomer William Herschel. The central bar is approximately 500 million years old.

NGC 3359 is "devouring" the much smaller galaxy, nicknamed the Little Cub.

== Supernova ==
One supernova has been observed in NGC 3359: SN 1985H (Type II, mag. 16) was discovered by J. C. Nemec and S. Staples on 3 April 1985.

== Gallery ==
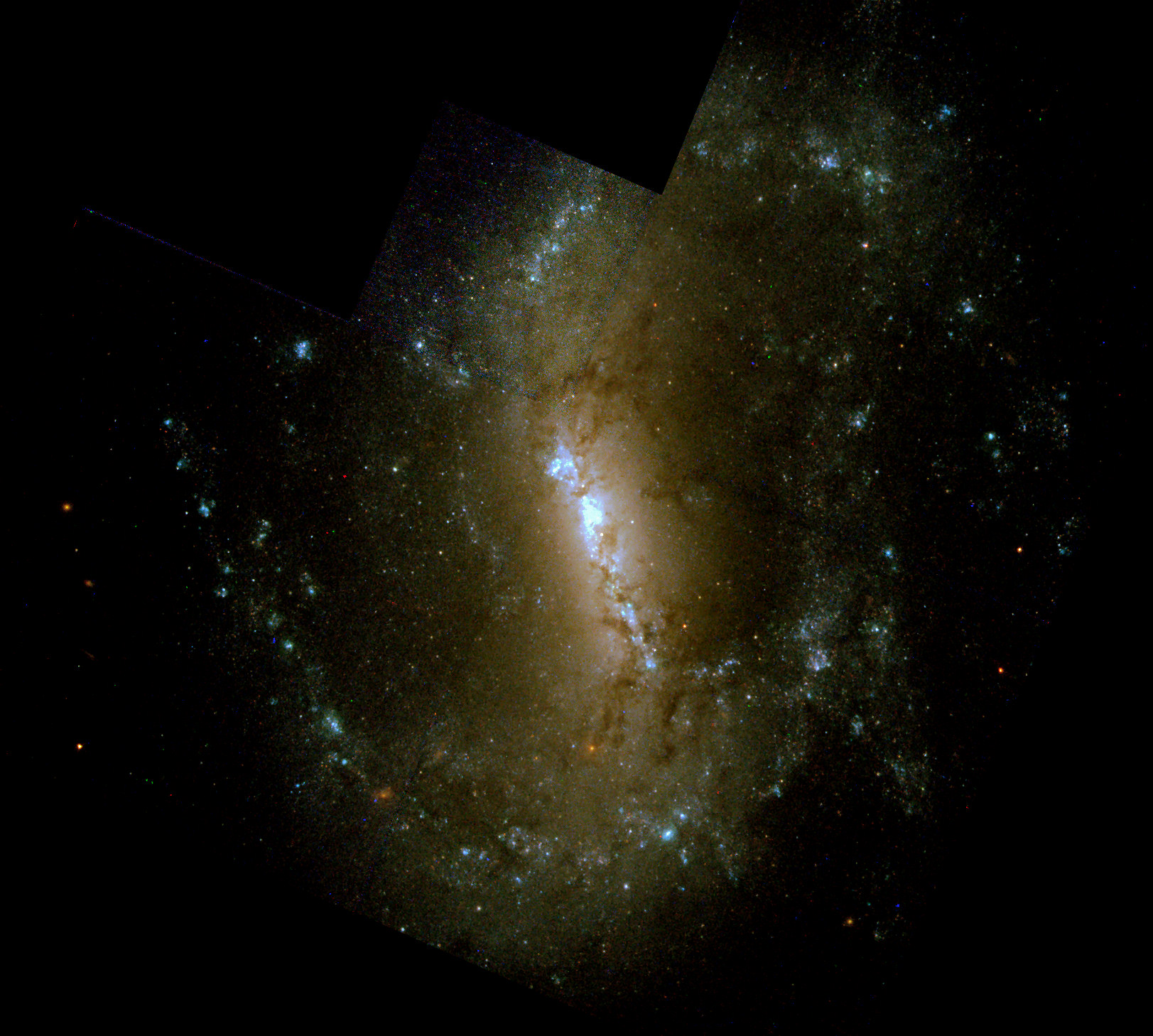
NGC 3359 imaged by the Hubble Space Telescope

== See also ==
- List of NGC objects (3001–4000)
