= NGC 3048 =

Pair of spiral galaxies in the constellation Leo

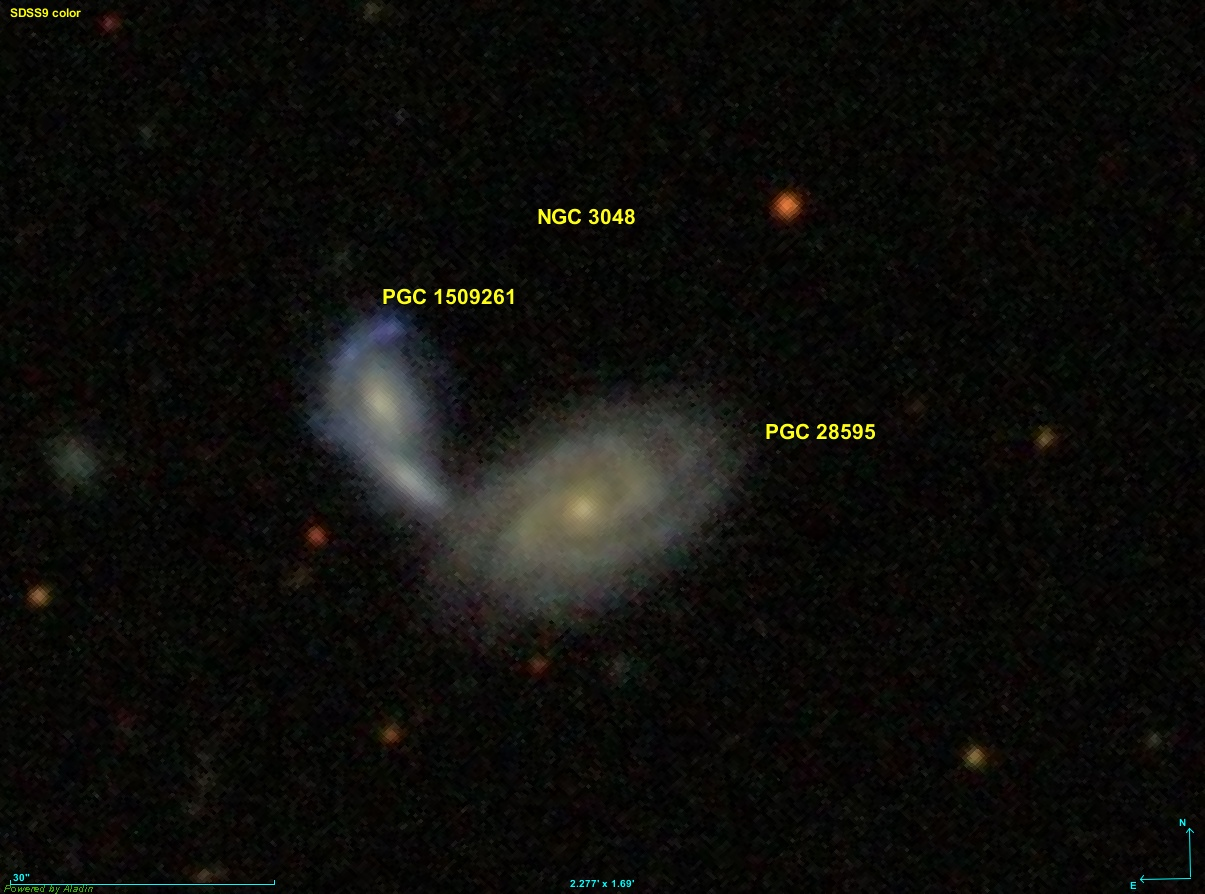
- SDSS image of NGC 3048

Observation data (J2000 epoch)
- Constellation: Leo
- Right ascension: 09^{h} 54^{m} 56^{s}
- Declination: 16° 27′ 26″
- Heliocentric radial velocity: 8860 km/s
- Distance: 410 Mly
- Apparent magnitude (B): 16.3

Characteristics
- Type: Sb
- Apparent size (V): .35' x .2'

Other designations
- CGCG 092-071

NGC 3048 is a pair of spiral galaxies located in the constellation Leo. It was discovered on April 27, 1864, by German astronomer Albert Marth. The object consists of a visual pair of galaxies, PGC 1509261 and PGC 28595. PGC 1509261 is likely a physical pair with a much fainter galactic object not a part of the New General Catalogue, J095458+162726.

== See also ==
- List of NGC objects (3001–4000)
