= NGC 3402 =

Galaxy in the constellation Hydra

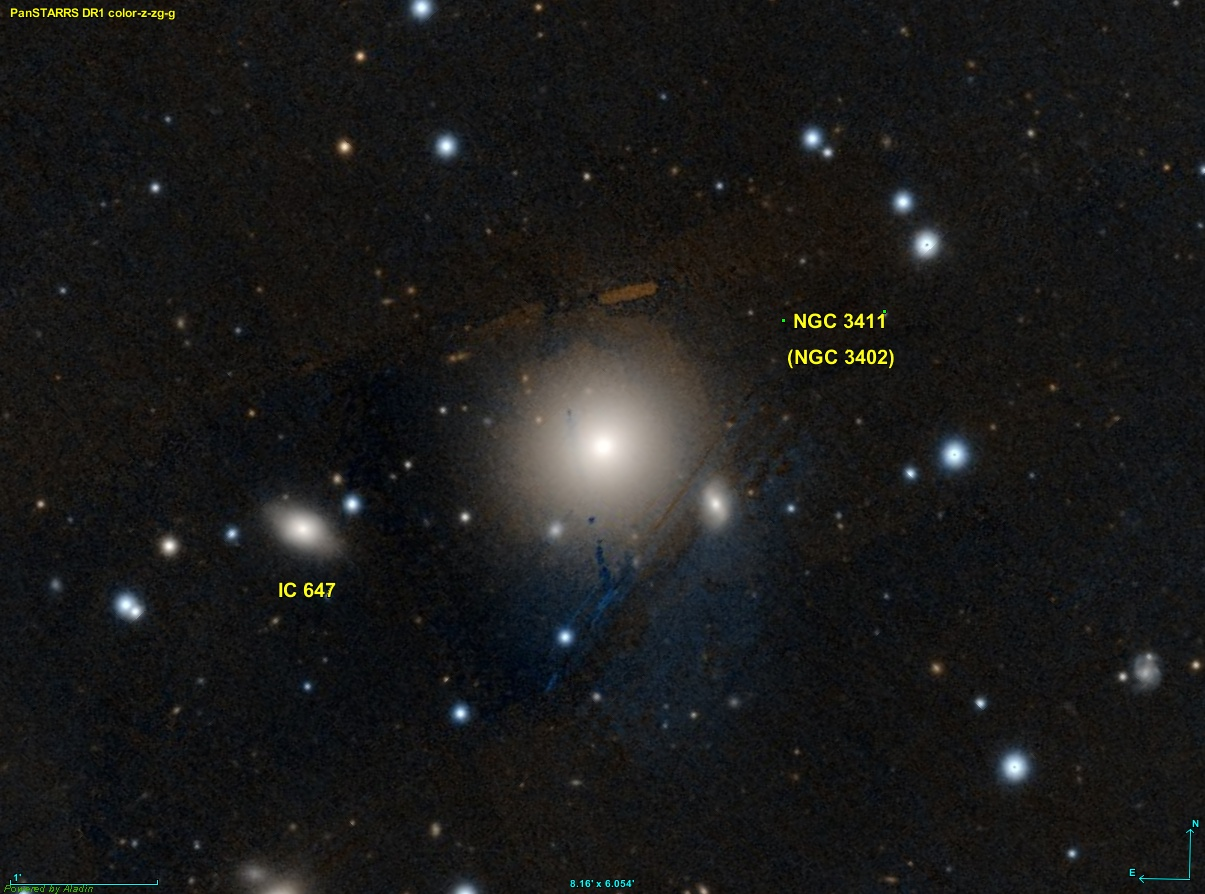
- Pan-STARRS image of NGC 3402/NGC 3411

Observation data (J2000 epoch)
- Constellation: Hydra
- Right ascension: 10^{h} 50^{m} 26.104^{s}
- Declination: −12° 50′ 42.26″
- Redshift: 4579 km/s
- Heliocentric radial velocity: 0.015274
- Distance: 305.42 ± 88.60 Mly (93.643 ± 27.165 Mpc)
- Apparent magnitude (V): 11.74
- Absolute magnitude (V): −23.05

Characteristics
- Type: cD
- Size: 194,400 ly (59,610 pc) (Note: RC3 D_{0} (blue) values used.)
- Apparent size (V): 2.1′ × 2.1′

Other designations
- NGC 3411, MCG -02-28-012, PGC 32479

NGC 3402, also known as NGC 3411, is an elliptical galaxy in the constellation Hydra. The object was discovered on March 25, 1786 by German-British astronomer William Herschel. NGC 3402 is the largest galaxy in the eponymous NGC 3402 cluster.

== See also ==
- List of NGC objects
