= NGC 3678 =

Galaxy in the constellation Leo

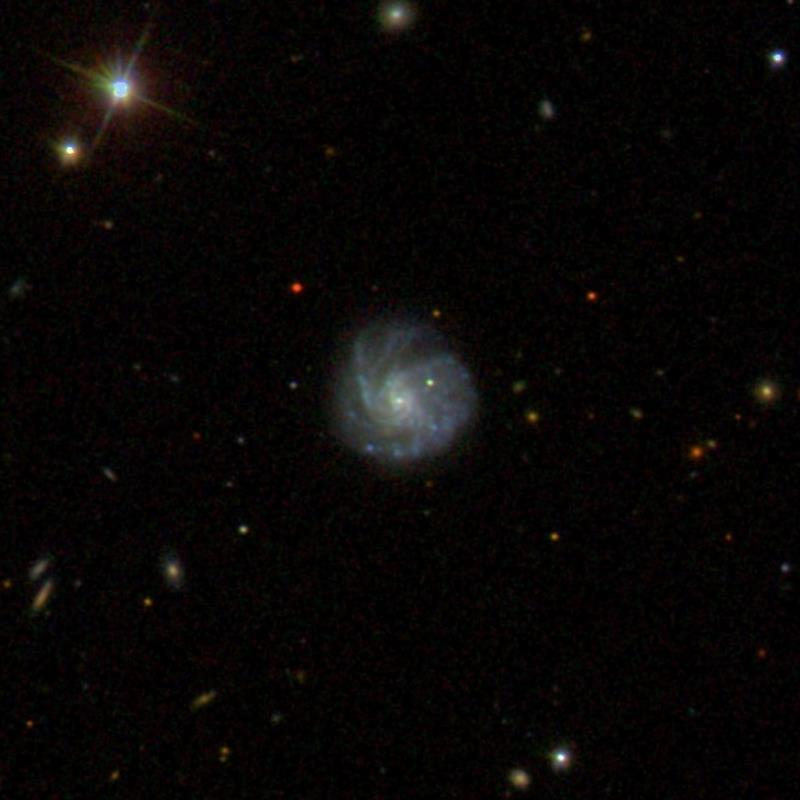
- A Sloan Digital Sky Survey (SDSS) image of NGC 3678

Observation data (J2000 epoch)
- Constellation: Leo
- Right ascension: 11^{h} 26^{m} 15.70^{s}
- Declination: +27° 52′ 01.00″
- Redshift: 0.02404±0.00001
- Distance: 361 Mly (110.75 Mpc)
- Apparent magnitude (V): 13.5

Characteristics
- Type: Sbc
- Size: 127,000 ly
- Apparent size (V): 0.724′ × 0.692′
- Notable features: N/A

Other designations
- PGC 35177, UGC 6443, Z 156-75, LEDA 35177, MCG +05-27-071

NGC 3678 is a spiral galaxy located around 361 million light-years away in the constellation Leo. NGC 3678 was discovered on April 13, 1831 by the astronomer John Herschel, and its diameter is 127,000 light-years across. NGC 3678 is not known to have much star-formation, and it is not known to have an active galactic nucleus.
