= NGC 3539 =

Galaxy in the constellation Ursa Major

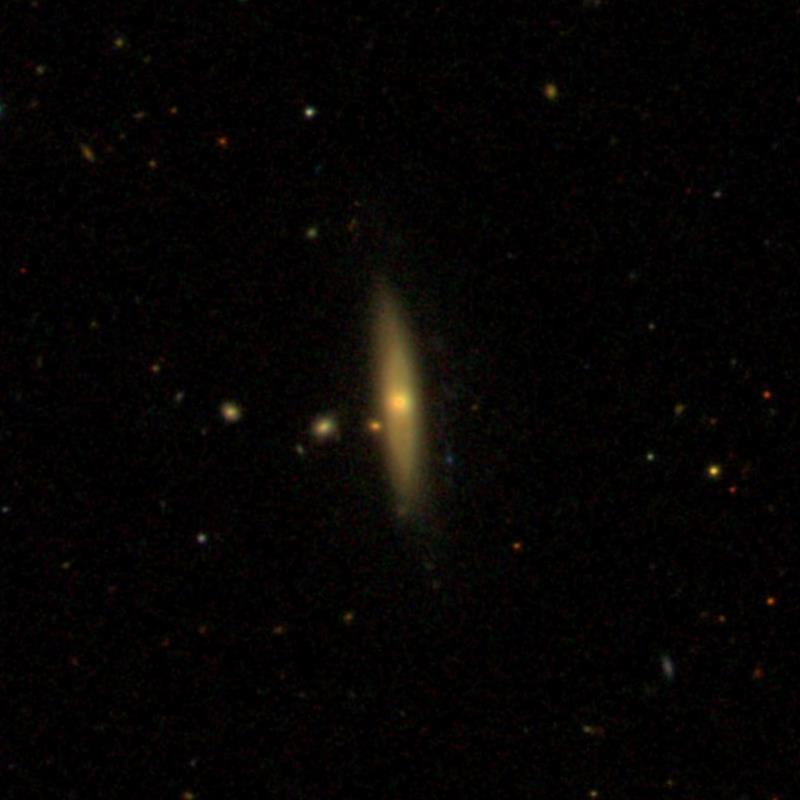
- SDSS image of NGC 3539

Observation data (J2000 epoch)
- Constellation: Ursa Major
- Right ascension: 11^{h} 09^{m} 08.840^{s}
- Declination: +28° 40′ 21.30″
- Redshift: 0.03230
- Heliocentric radial velocity: 9527 km/s
- Distance: 561.61 ± 0.65 Mly (172.19 ± 0.20 Mpc)
- Group or cluster: Abell 1185
- Apparent magnitude (B): 15.47

Characteristics
- Type: S0/a
- Apparent size (V): 1.1′ × 0.25′

Other designations
- MCG +05-26-065, PGC 33799

NGC 3539 is a lenticular galaxy in the constellation Ursa Major. It was discovered in April 1831 by John Herschel. It is a member of the galaxy cluster Abell 1185.
