= NGC 3357 =

Galaxy in the constellation Leo

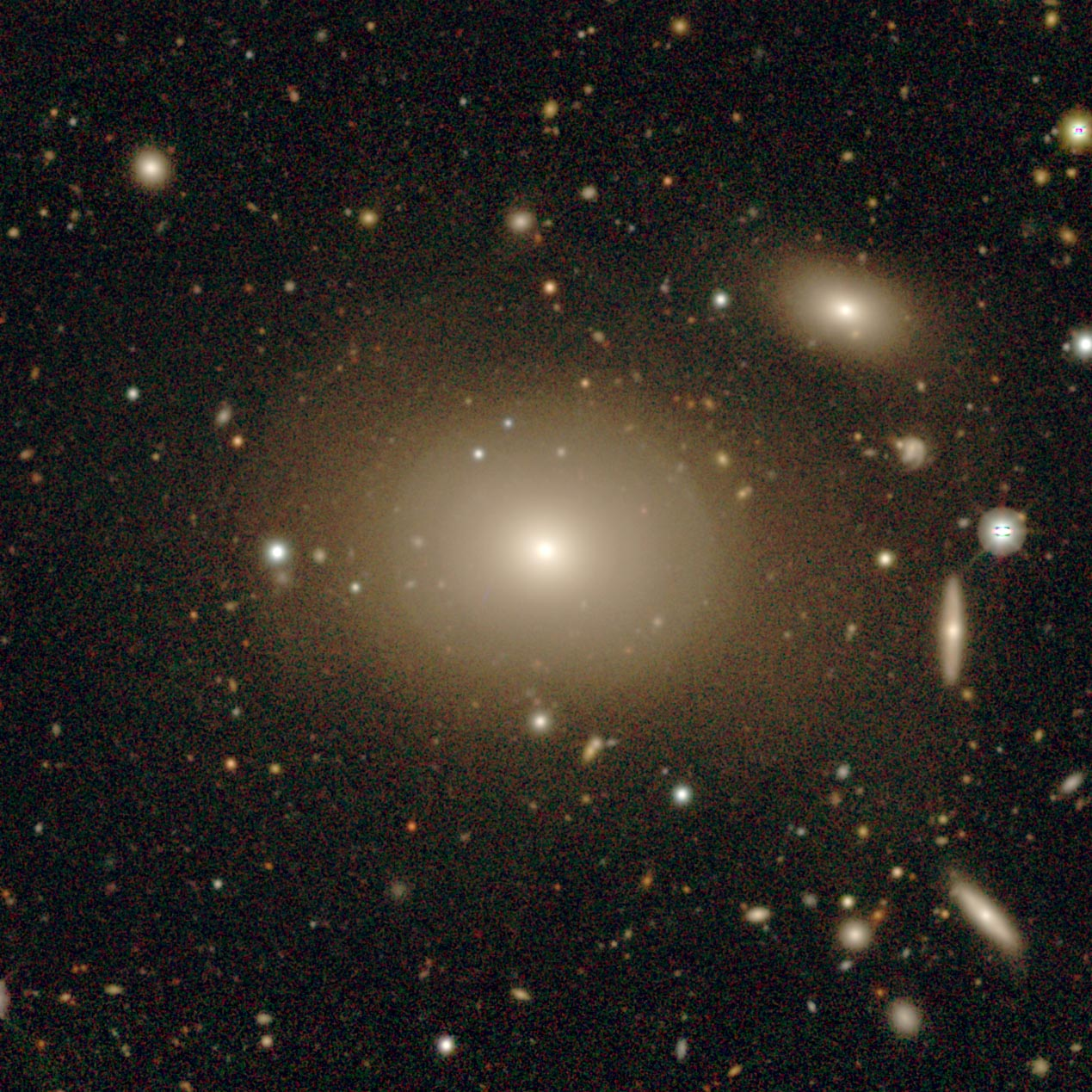
- legacy surveys image of NGC 3357

Observation data (J2000 epoch)
- Constellation: Leo
- Right ascension: 10^{h} 44^{m} 20.76^{s}
- Declination: +14° 05′ 04.34″
- Redshift: 0.032756
- Apparent magnitude (V): 13.0

Characteristics
- Type: E
- Apparent size (V): 1′.3 × 1′.2

Other designations
- UGC 5206, MCG +02-28-002, PGC 32032

NGC 3357 is an elliptical galaxy located in the constellation of Leo. It was discovered on April 5, 1864, by German astronomer Albert Marth.
