= NGC 3068 =

Galaxy in the constellation Leo

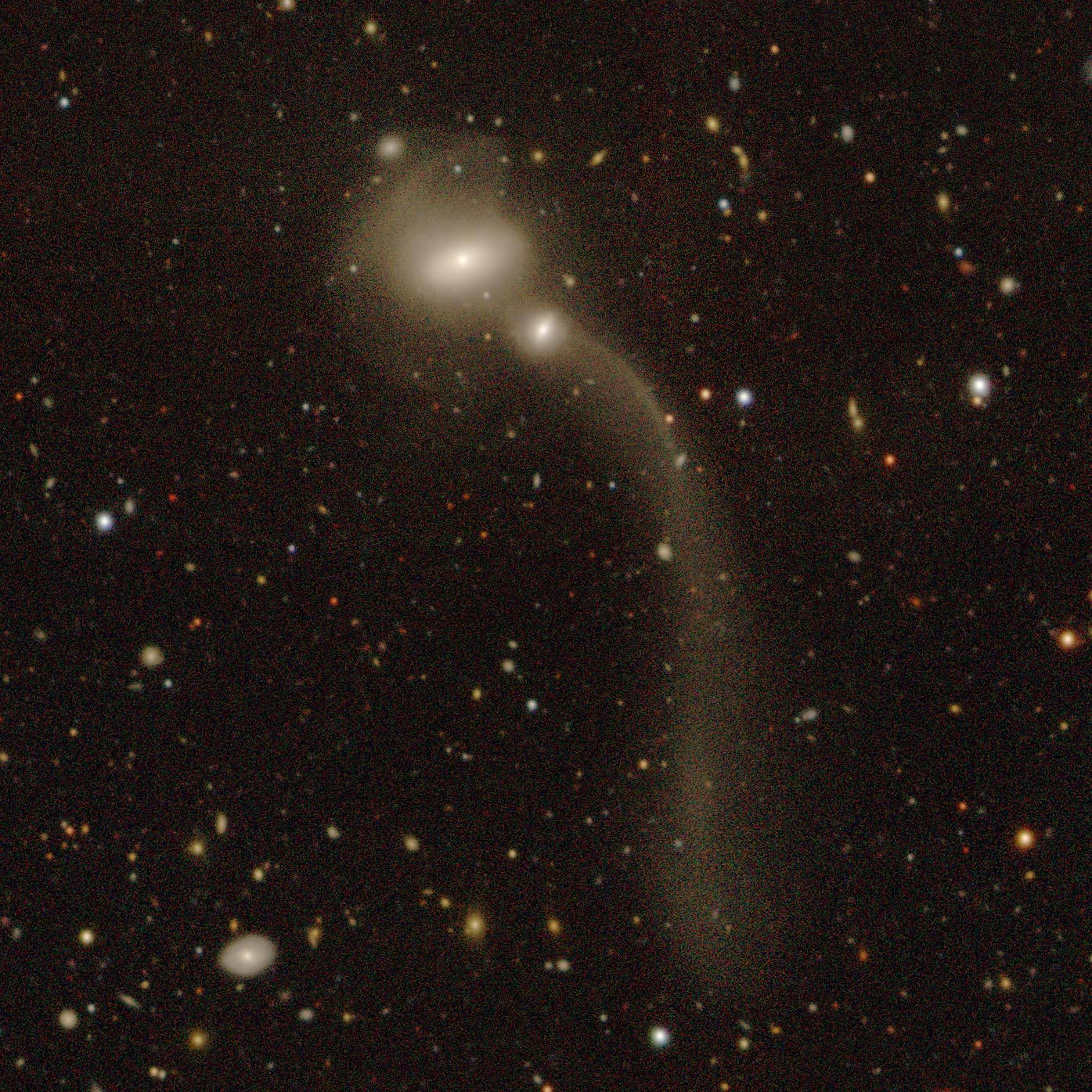
- NGC 3068 with Legacy Surveys DR10

Observation data (J2000 epoch)
- Constellation: Leo
- Right ascension: 09^{h} 58^{m} 40.1457^{s}
- Declination: +28° 52′ 38.283″
- Redshift: 0.02133±0.00026
- Apparent magnitude (V): 14.05

Other designations
- Arp 174, MCG +05-24-006, CGCG 153-006

NGC 3068 is a lenticular galaxy in the constellation Leo. It was discovered on March 12, 1785 by William Herschel.

== See Also ==
Atlas of Peculiar Galaxies
