= NGC 3749 =

Spiral galaxy in the constellation of Centaurus

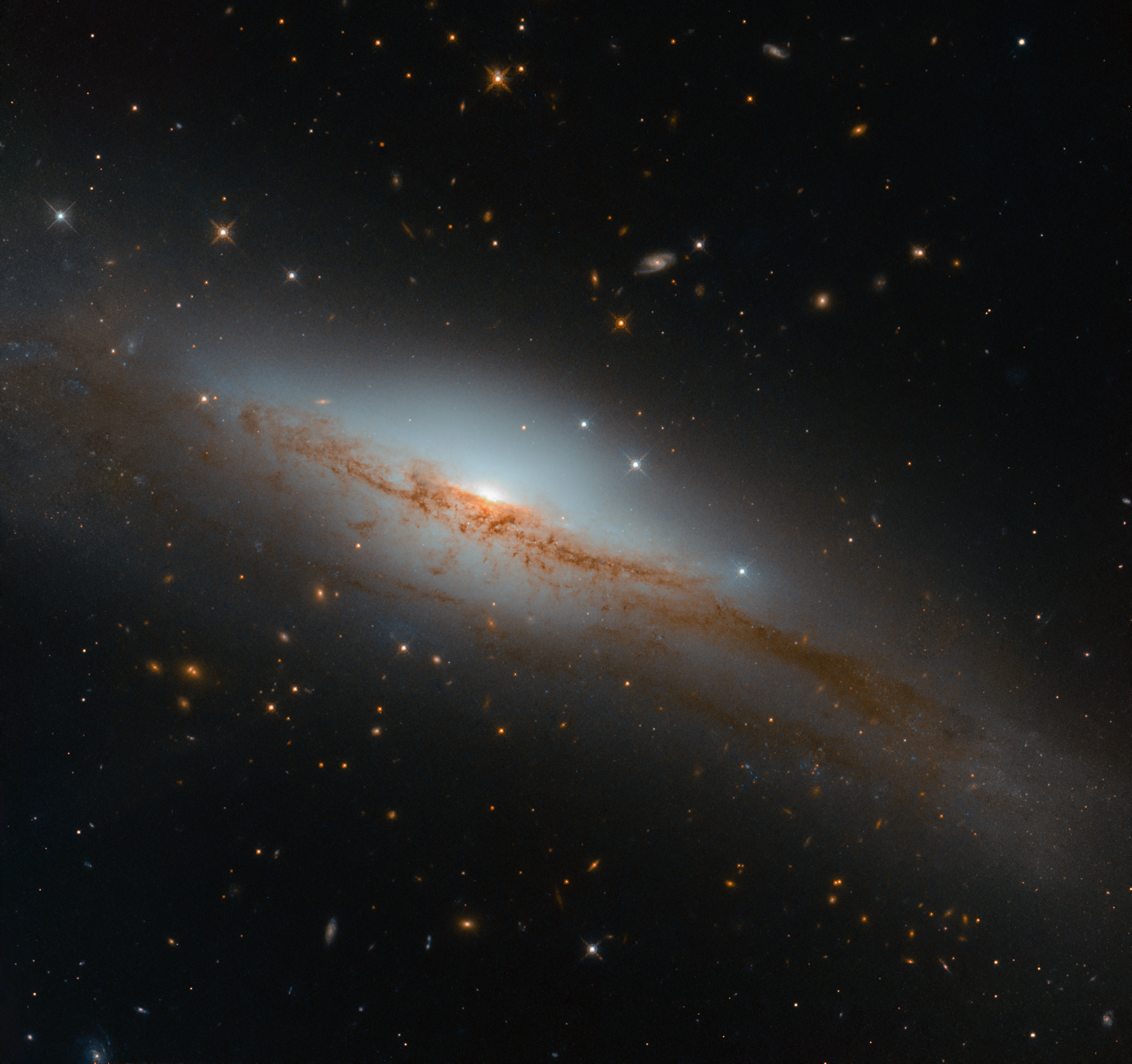
- NGC 3749 taken by Hubble Space Telescope.

Observation data (J2000 epoch)
- Constellation: Centaurus
- Right ascension: 11^{h} 35^{m} 53.203^{s}
- Declination: −37° 59′ 50.39″
- Redshift: 0.009272
- Heliocentric radial velocity: 2766.7km/s
- Distance: 130.52 Mly
- Apparent magnitude (B): 13.22

Characteristics
- Type: Sa

Other designations
- AM 1133-374, 6dFGS gJ113553.2-375951, ESO 320-8, ESO-LV 320-0080, HIPASS J1135-38, IRAS 11333-3743, IRAS F11334-3743, LEDA 35861, 2MASX J11355320-3759503, MCG-06-26-002, NVSS J113553-375951, PMN J1135-3800, PSCz Q11333-3743, RR95 198b, SGC 113325-3743.2, SUMSS J113553-375949, [CHM2007] HDC 658 J113553.20-3759503, [CHM2007] LDC 916 J113553.20-3759503

NGC 3749 is a spiral galaxy located in the constellation of Centaurus at an approximate distance of 130.52 million light-years. NGC 3749 was discovered in 1835 by John Herschel.

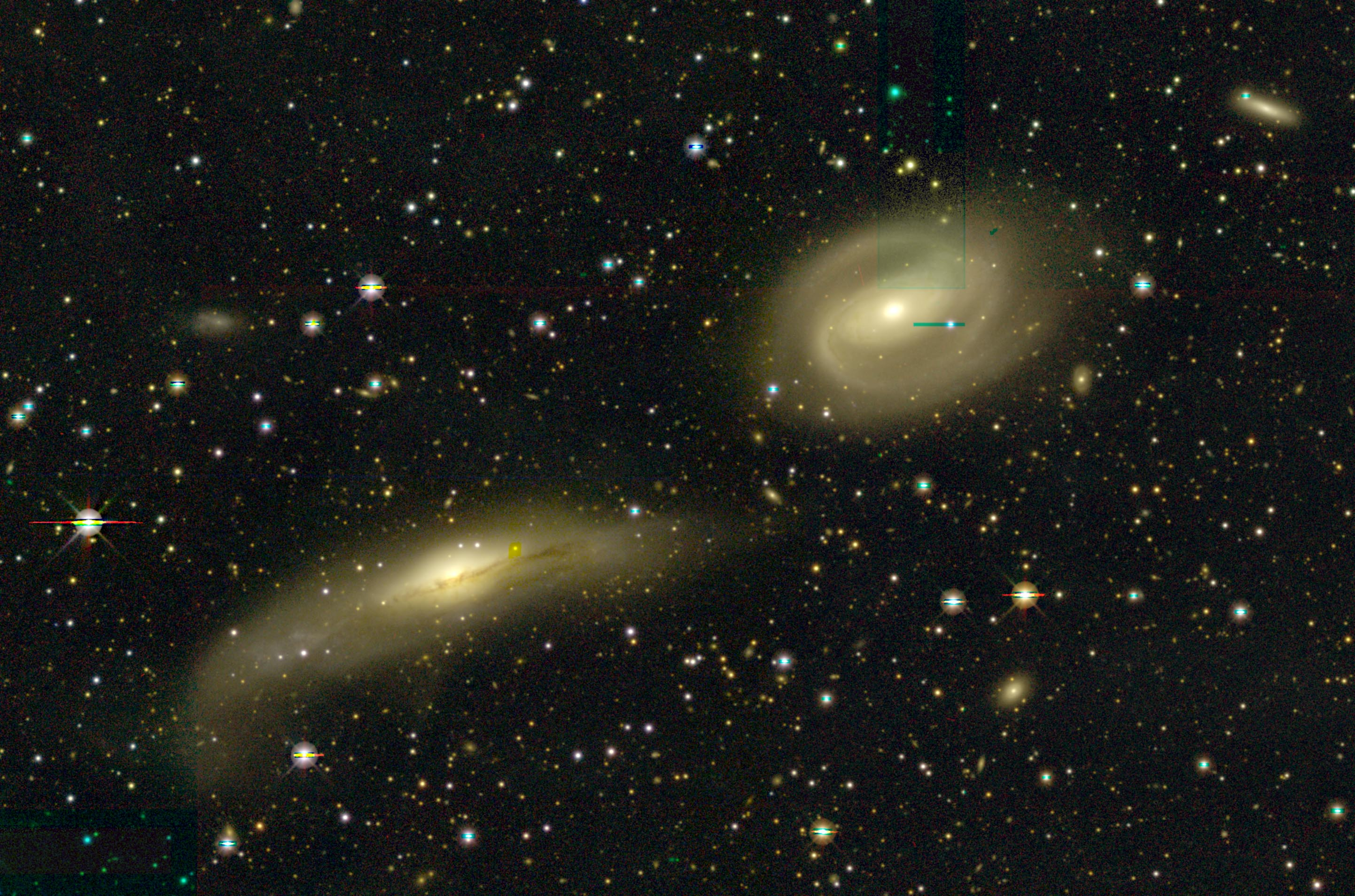
NGC 3749 (left) and NGC 3742 (right) with the legacy surveys
