= NGC 3059 =

Galaxy in the constellation Carina

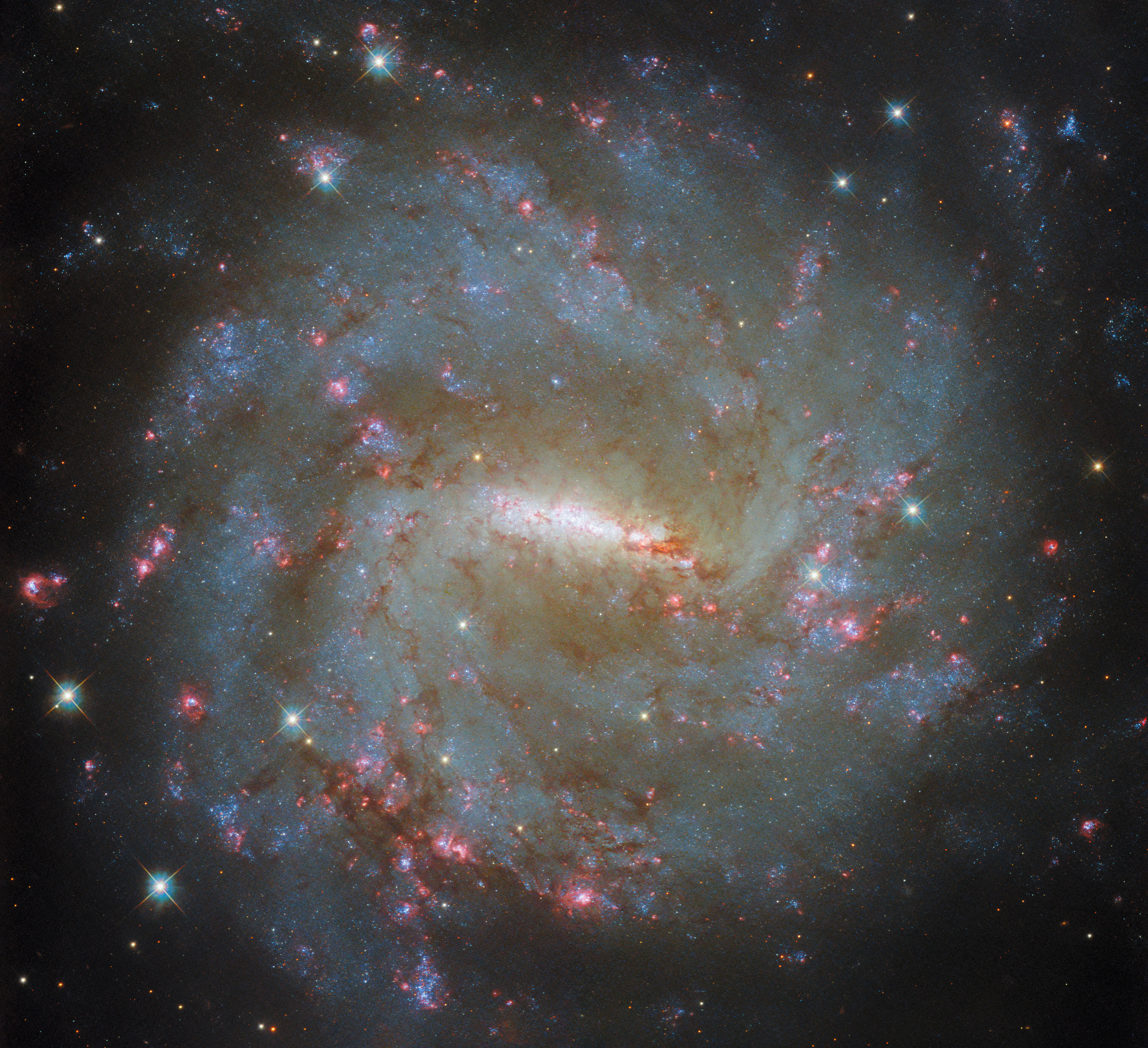
- Hubble Space Telescope image of NGC 3059

Observation data (J2000 epoch)
- Constellation: Carina
- Right ascension: 09^{h} 50^{m} 08.181^{s}
- Declination: −73° 55′ 19.96″
- Redshift: 0.004244
- Heliocentric radial velocity: 1269.5 km/s
- Distance: 48.3 Mly (14.80 Mpc)
- Apparent magnitude (V): 11.24
- Apparent magnitude (B): 11.56

Characteristics
- Type: SB(rs)bc

Other designations
- PGC 28298

NGC 3059 is a barred spiral galaxy. It is located in the constellation of Carina. The galaxy can be described as being faint, large, and irregularly round. It was discovered on February 22, 1835, by John Herschel. The galaxy has been calculated to be 45 - 50 million lightyears from Earth.
