= NGC 3009 =

Galaxy in the constellation Ursa Major

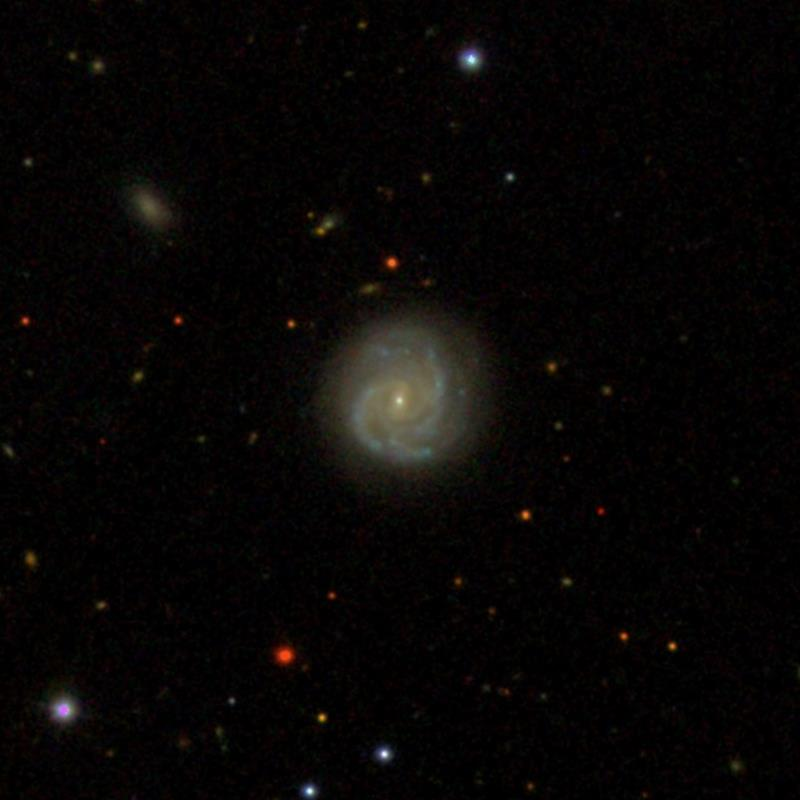
- NGC 3009 (SDSS DR 14)

Observation data (J2000 epoch)
- Constellation: Ursa Major
- Right ascension: 09^{h} 50^{m} 33.2^{s}
- Declination: +44° 18′ 52″
- Distance: 205 Mly (63 Mpc)
- Apparent magnitude (V): 14.5

Characteristics
- Type: S0:
- Apparent size (V): 0.55'x 0.25'

NGC 3009 is a lenticular galaxy in the constellation of Ursa Major. It is about 35 thousand light years across, and with a recessional velocity of 4,445 kilometers per second, is at a distance of 205 million light years from the sun. NGC 3009 is also known by the catalog name of PGC 28330, and is often mistaken for the dimmer PGC 28303. This is because these objects are very close to each other in the sky, and the astronomer Dreyer misinterpreted John Herschel's original March 17, 1828 record of the galaxy, mistaking it for one a few arcminutes to the west (which is now known as PGC 28303). Herschel would have been unable to see PGC 28303 as anything but a background star, due to his less advanced telescope at the time.
