= NGC 3435 =

Galaxy in the constellation Leo Minor

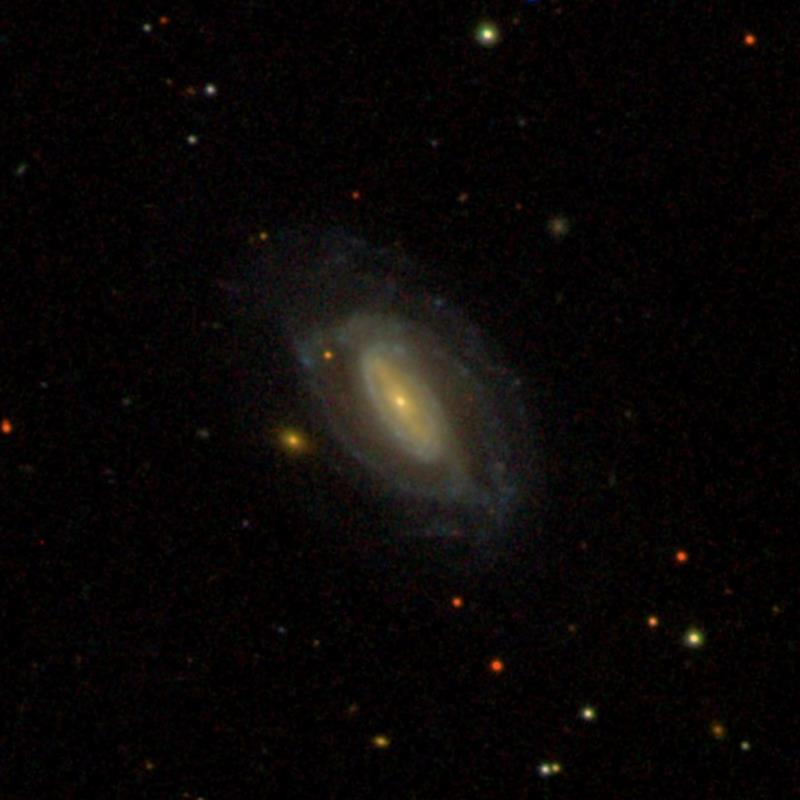
- NGC 3435

Observation data (J2000 epoch)
- Constellation: Ursa Major
- Right ascension: 10^{h} 54^{m} 48.3299^{s}
- Declination: +61° 17′ 23.483″
- Redshift: 5 181 ± 2 km/s
- Apparent magnitude (V): 13.2

Characteristics
- Type: barred spiral galaxy
- Apparent size (V): 1.8′ × 1.2′

Other designations
- PGC 32786, UGC 6025, MCG 10-16-22, CGCG 291.12, IRAS10517+61322

NGC 3435 is a barred spiral galaxy located about 235 million light-years from the Milky Way, and is about 125 000 light-years across. It can be found in the constellation Ursa Major. It was discovered on 9 April 1793 by astronomer William Herschel.

The galaxy has the surface brightness equal to 14.04 mag/Minute and second of arcam², which classifiers it as low surface brightness galaxy (LSB).

== Supernova ==
On 29 March 1999, in the galaxy was observed the type Ia supernova, designated as SN 1999bh. It was discovered by W. Li, as part of the Lick Observatory Supernova Search (LOSS) program by the Lick Observatory.
