= NGC 3274 =

Relatively faint spiral galaxy in the constellation Leo

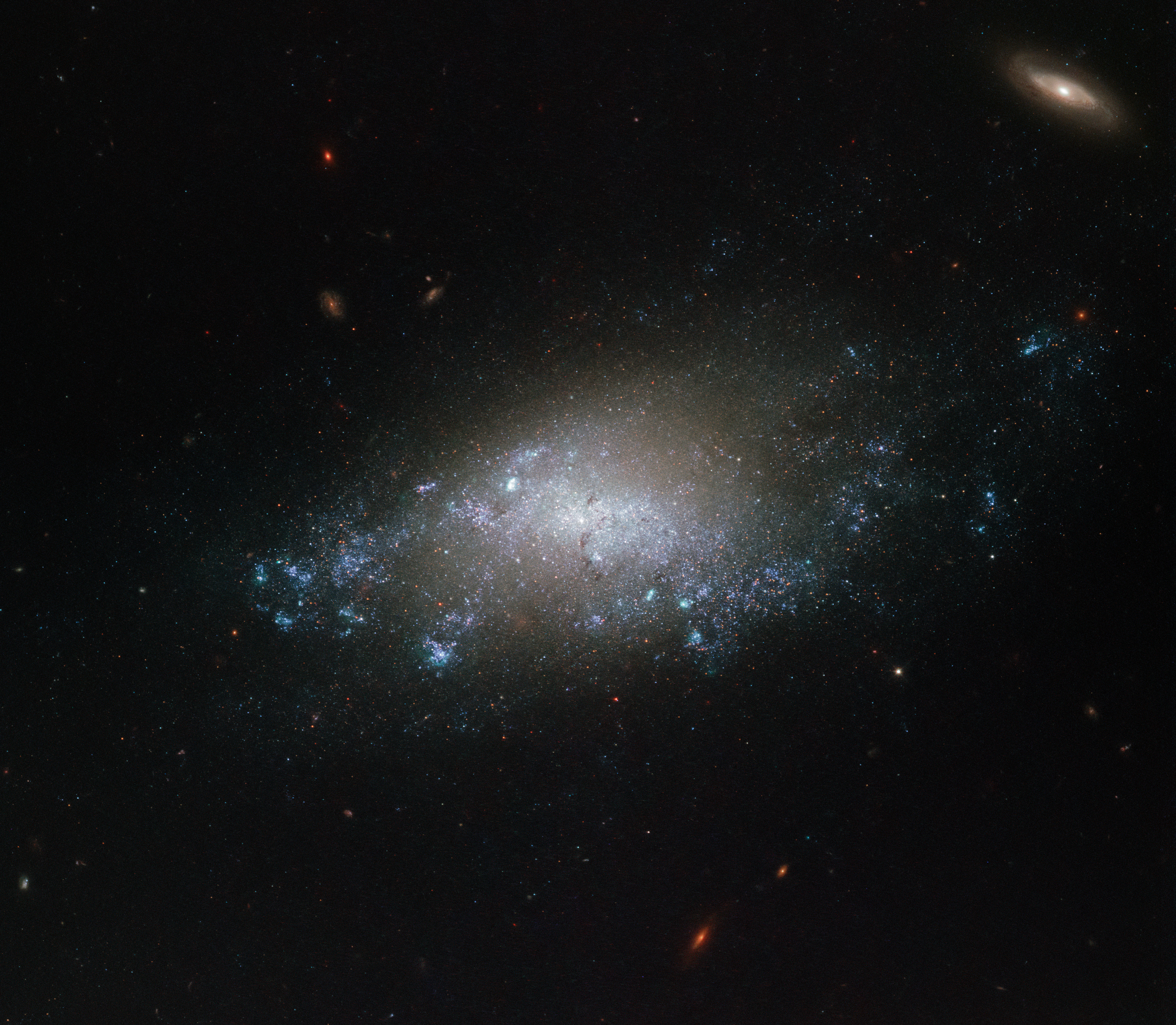
- NGC 3274, imaged by the Hubble Space Telescope

Observation data (J2000 epoch)
- Constellation: Leo
- Right ascension: 10^{h} 32^{m} 17.281^{s}
- Declination: +27° 40′ 07.59″
- Redshift: 0.001791
- Heliocentric radial velocity: 537
- Distance: 42.82 ± 27.52 Mly (13.129 ± 8.438 Mpc)
- Apparent magnitude (V): 12.32
- Absolute magnitude (V): −17.88

Characteristics
- Type: SABm
- Size: 27,300 kly (8,360 kpc)
- Apparent size (V): 2.188′ × ?′

Other designations
- UGC 5721, MCG+05-25-020, PGC 31122

NGC 3274 is a relatively faint spiral galaxy discovered by Wilhelm Herschel in 1783, and is located over 20 million light-years away in the constellation of Leo.
