= NGC 3302 =

Lenticular galaxy in the constellation Antlia

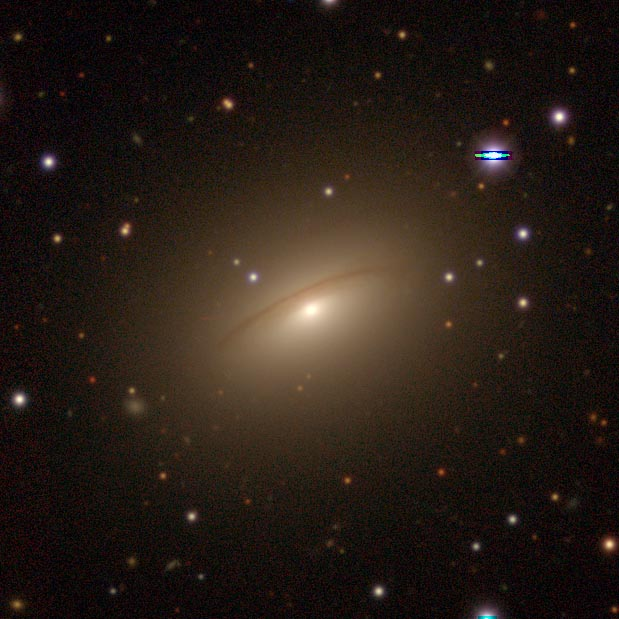
- legacy surveys image of NGC 3302

Observation data (J2000 epoch)
- Constellation: Antlia
- Right ascension: 10^{h} 35^{m} 47.417^{s}
- Declination: −32° 21′ 30.76″
- Redshift: 0.013263
- Heliocentric radial velocity: 3950 km/s
- Distance: 64.99 ± 4.57 Mly (19.93 ± 1.40 Mpc)
- Apparent magnitude (B): 13.51

Characteristics
- Type: SA0^{0}

Other designations
- MCG -05-25-020, PGC 31391

NGC 3302 is an unbarred lenticular galaxy in the constellation Antlia. It was discovered by the astronomer John Herschel on January 28, 1835.
