= NGC 3182 =

Galaxy in the constellation Ursa Major

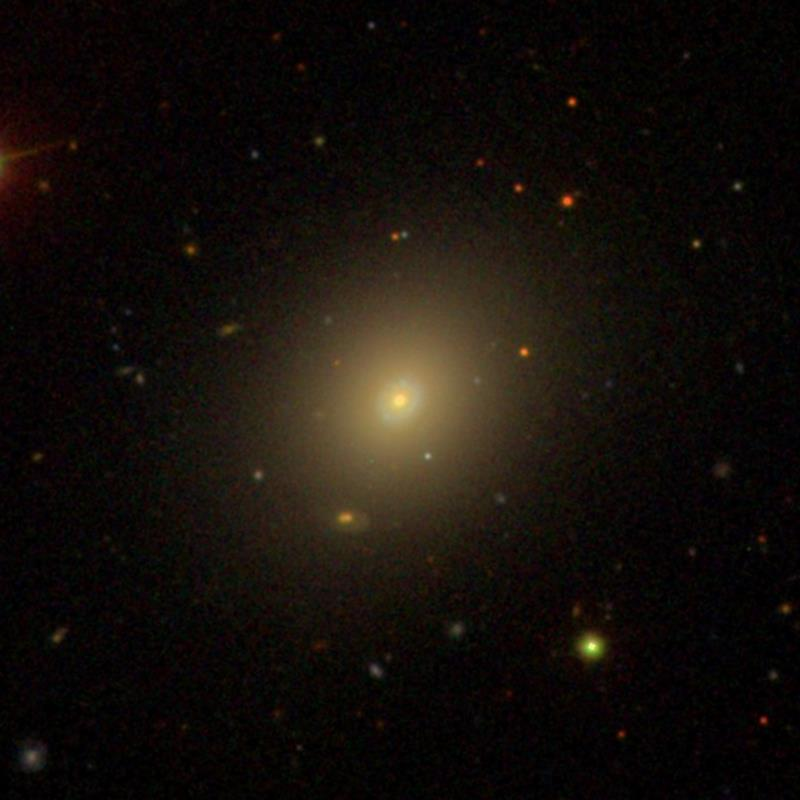
- NGC 3182 imaged by Sloan Digital Sky Survey

Observation data (J2000 epoch)
- Constellation: Ursa Major
- Right ascension: 10^{h} 19^{m} 33.0275^{s}
- Declination: +58° 12′ 20.829″
- Redshift: 0.007003 ± 0.000005
- Heliocentric radial velocity: 2,099 ± 1 km/s
- Distance: 112 ± 7.8 Mly (34.2 ± 2.4 Mpc)
- Apparent magnitude (V): 12.0

Characteristics
- Type: SA(r)a?
- Size: ~54,000 ly (16.6 kpc) (estimated)
- Apparent size (V): 1.53′ × 1.22′

Other designations
- IRAS F10161+5827, UGC 5568, MCG +10-15-062, PGC 30176, CGCG 290-027

NGC 3182 is an unbarred spiral galaxy in the constellation Ursa Major. The galaxy lies about 110 million light years away from Earth, which means, given its apparent dimensions, that NGC 3182 is approximately 55,000 light years across. It was discovered by William Herschel on April 8, 1793.

== Characteristics ==
NGC 3182 has a circumnuclear blue ring with a radius of 5.5 arcseconds. The ring is also visible in radiowaves. The galaxy may also have a thick disk of diffuse gas, but lacks a bar. The star formation rate (SFR) estimated from Hα flux shows some enhancement in the nuclear ring of NGC 3182. SFR is estimated to be 0.006 M_{☉} per year. From the stellar age and [α/Fe] gradient from index measurements, abrupt star formation activity has occurred recently at the ring in NGC 3182. There is no evidence of gravitational interactions from its symmetry of stellar and gas kinematics, and thus the nuclear star formation may not be triggered by the accretion of fresh extragalactic gas.

NGC 3182 hosts an active nucleus (AGN) at the center surrounded by star-forming regions from emission-line-ratio diagrams and it is categorised as a Seyfert galaxy. The gas in the ring of NGC 3182 appears to be ionized by young stars and its metallicity is even higher than the gas metallicity at the galaxy center. Such enhancement of gas metallicity may be a natural result of additional star formation from the in situ gas, possibly triggered by an AGN feedback. Although there is no evidence of kinetic feedback by strong outflows in NGC 3182, a luminous AGN is known to cause symmetric outflows by radiation pressure.

== Nearby galaxies ==
NGC 3182 is the foremost galaxy of the NGC 3182 Group. NGC 3225 is also a member of the group, along with some fainter galaxies. Other nearby galaxies include MRK 1434, UGC 5541, UGCA 206, UGC 5475, and UGC 5480.
