= NGC 3030 =

Lenticular galaxy in the constellation Hydra

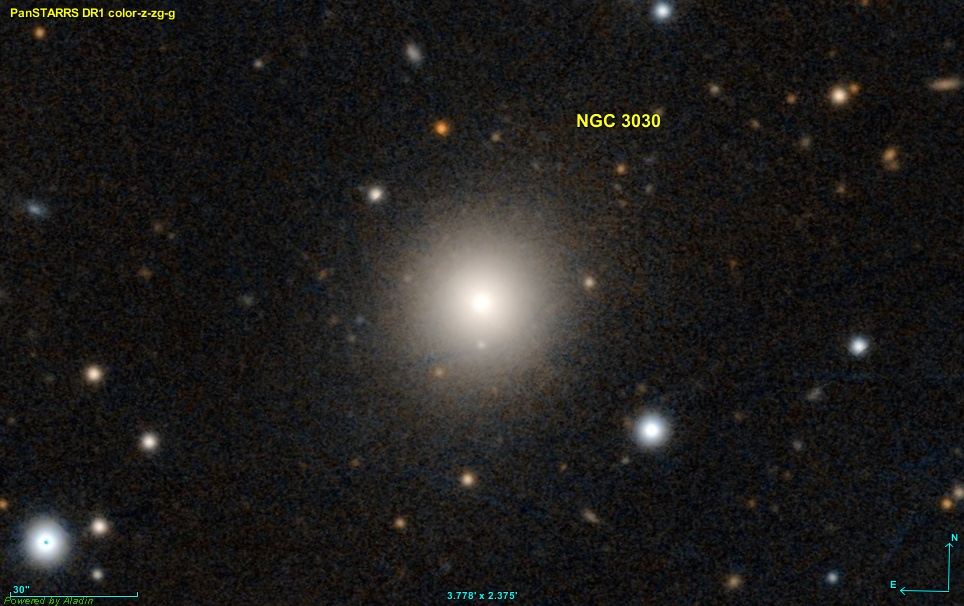

Observation data (J2000.0 epoch)
- Constellation: Hydra
- Right ascension: 09^{h} 50^{m} 10,5^{s}
- Declination: −12° 13′ 33″
- Redshift: ~0.009
- Heliocentric radial velocity: 2,702 km/s
- Distance: 113 million LY
- Apparent magnitude (V): 13.3

Characteristics
- Apparent size (V): 1.00 x 0.9

NGC 3030 (also known as PGC 28302 or MCG-02-25-021) is a lenticular galaxy located within the constellation Hydra. It is classified as a type E-S0 galaxy. The galaxy was first discovered in 1886 by astronomer Francis Leavenworth. He described it to be "extremely faint, very small, round, brighter middle". It's around 25 thousand light years across.
