= NGC 3647 =

Elliptical galaxy in constellation Leo

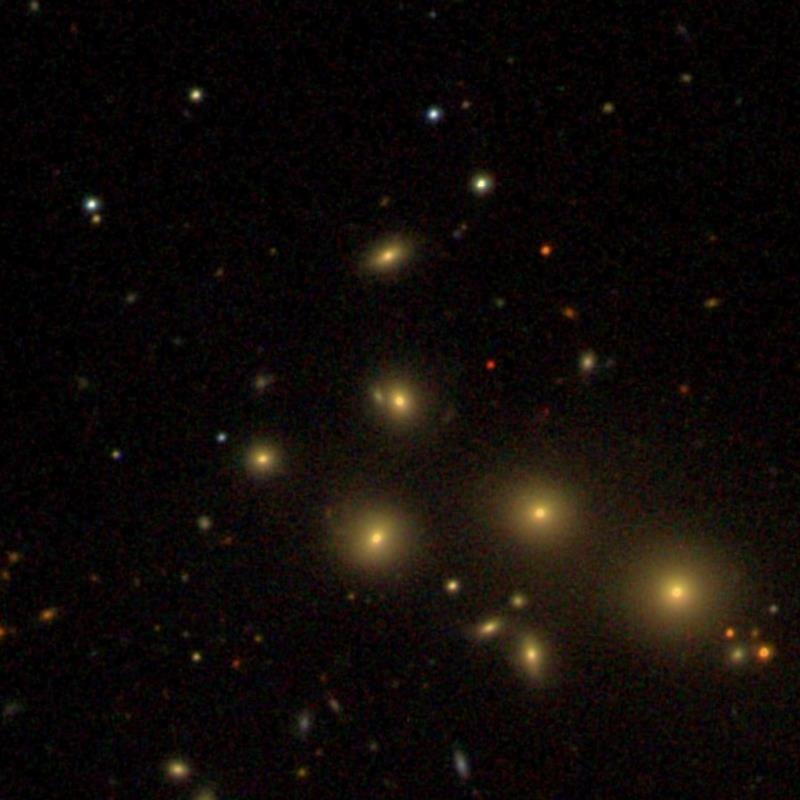

Observation data
- Constellation: Leo
- Right ascension: 11^{h} 21^{m} 32.6^{s}
- Declination: +02° 53′ 14″
- Redshift: 0.04985 0.00001
- Heliocentric radial velocity: 14,573 km/s
- Distance: 747 Mly
- Apparent magnitude (V): 15.6

Characteristics
- Type: E
- Size: 72,000 ly

Other designations
- PGC 34816, 2MASX J11213813+0254119, Z 39-142, SDSS J112138+025411.4

NGC 3647 is a small elliptical galaxy in the constellation Leo. The galaxy was first discovered on March 22, 1865 by Albert Marth who was a German astronomer. It is approximately 747 million light-years away. Due to its close proximity to five other elliptical galaxies, there was a bit of confusion for Marth to identify which object is NGC 3647.

According to SIMBAD, it is identified as PGC 34816. But in HyperLeda and by NASA/IPAC databases, NGC 3647 is identified as PGC 34815. The correct designation for this article, according sources from wikidata is PGC 34816. There is no evidence whether this galaxy has an active nucleus or not.
