= Markarian 1263 =

Barred spiral galaxy

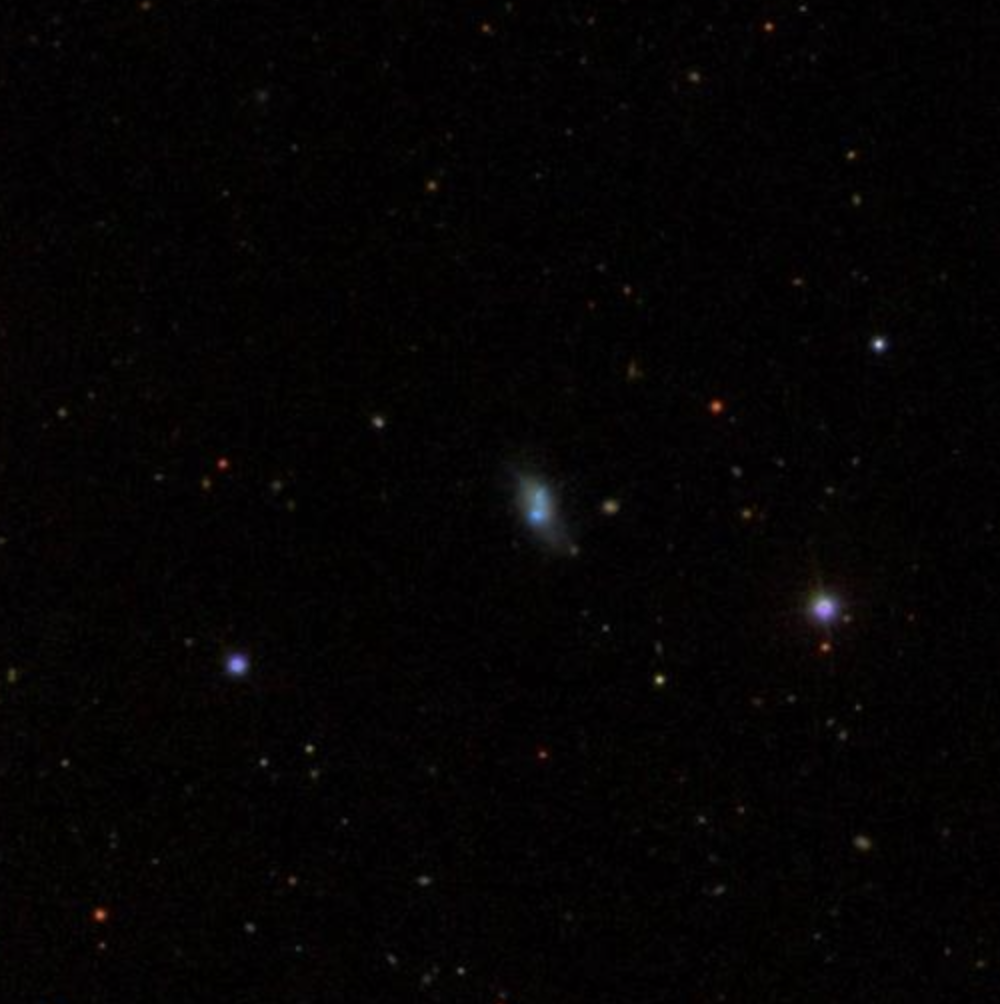

Observation data
- Constellation: Leo
- Right ascension: 10^{h} 48^{m} 56^{s}
- Declination: +12° 11′ 41″

Other designations
- FSG II-32, LEDA 32346, Z 66-25

MRK 1263 is an compact dwarf galaxy in Leo. It is an active galaxy, and is a notable starburst galaxy.

It is a member of the NGC 3338 Group along with NGC 3338, NGC 3346, NGC 3389 and UGC 5832.
