= NGC 3632 =

Galaxy in the constellation Leo

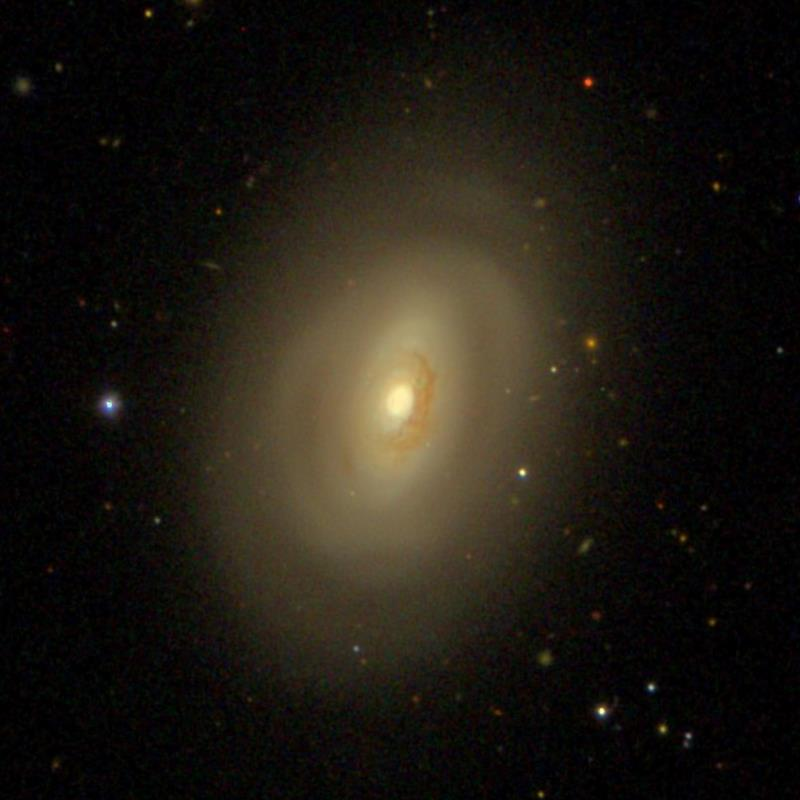
- SDSS image of NGC 3632

Observation data (J2000 epoch)
- Constellation: Leo
- Right ascension: 11^{h} 20^{m} 03.794^{s}
- Declination: +18° 21′ 24.45″
- Redshift: 0.004977
- Heliocentric radial velocity: 1488 km/s
- Distance: 74.72 ± 0.39 Mly (22.91 ± 0.12 Mpc)
- Apparent magnitude (V): 10.98
- Apparent magnitude (B): 11.80

Characteristics
- Type: (R)SA0^{+}(rs)

Other designations
- Caldwell 40, NGC 3626, UGC 6343, MCG +03-29-032, PGC 34684

NGC 3632 (also known as Caldwell 40) and NGC 3626 is an unbarred lenticular galaxy and Caldwell object in the constellation Leo. It was discovered by William Herschel, on 14 March 1784. It shines at magnitude +10.6/+10.9. Its celestial coordinates are RA 11^{h} 20.1^{m} , dec +18° 21′. It is located near the naked-eye-class A4 star Zosma, as well as galaxies NGC 3608, NGC 3607, NGC 3659, NGC 3686, NGC 3684, NGC 3691, NGC 3681, and NGC 3655. Its dimensions are 2′.7 × 1′.9. The galaxy belongs to the NGC 3607 group some 70 million light-years distant, itself one of the many Leo II groups.
