= NGC 3681 =

Galaxy in the constellation Leo

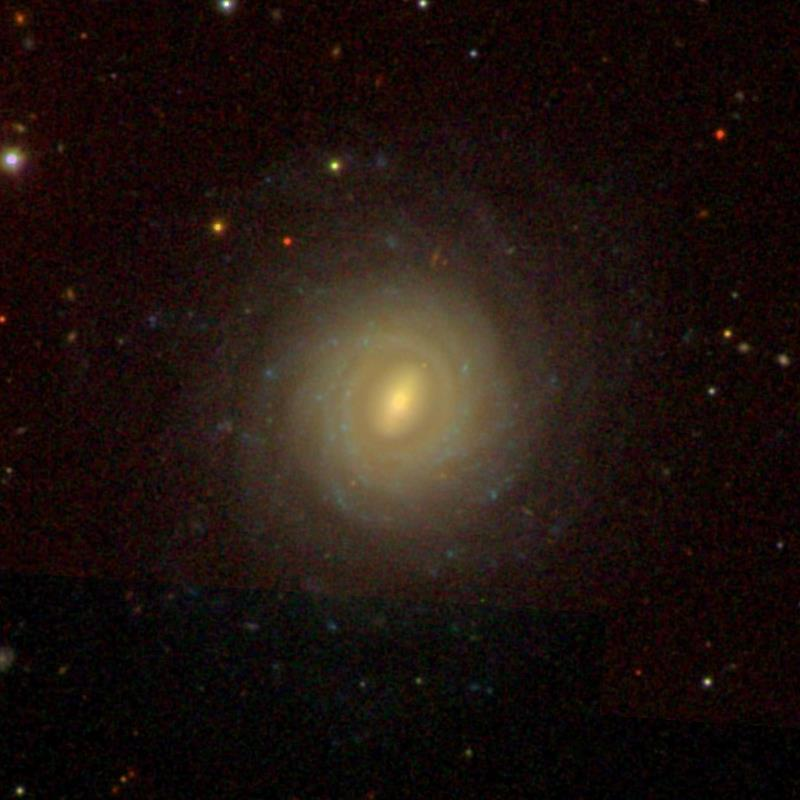
- NGC 3681 imaged by Sloan Digital Sky Survey

Observation data (J2000 epoch)
- Constellation: Leo
- Right ascension: 11^{h} 26^{m} 29.7943^{s}
- Declination: +16° 51′ 48.360″
- Redshift: 0.004109 ± 0.000006
- Heliocentric radial velocity: 1,232 ± 2 km/s
- Distance: 92.6 ± 8.9 Mly (28.4 ± 2.7 Mpc)
- Group or cluster: Leo II Groups
- Apparent magnitude (V): 11.6

Characteristics
- Type: SAB(r)bc
- Size: ~81,000 ly (24.8 kpc) (estimated)
- Apparent size (V): 2.5′ × 2.0′

Other designations
- IRAS 11238+1708, UGC 6445, MCG +03-29-048, PGC 35193, CGCG 096-045

NGC 3681 is an intermediate spiral galaxy in the constellation Leo. The galaxy lies about 90 million light years away from Earth, which means, given its apparent dimensions, that NGC 3681 is approximately 80,000 light years across. It was discovered by William Herschel on April 17, 1784.

NGC 3681 is characterised as an intermediate spiral galaxy, meaning it has a short bar. The bar makes the bulge appear elliptical. The disk of the galaxy is smooth and low surface brightness. A ring is formed at the inner part of the disk. The galaxy has multiple flocculent spiral arms and fragments. There are higher surface brightness inner arms and fainter outer arms. HII regions have been spotted in both. In ultraviolet the galaxy appears more extended than in optical. Also the inner ring is more pronounced. The galaxy also has an excess of hydrogen. The galaxy is seen nearly face-on, at an inclination of about 15°.

NGC 3681 is a member of the NGC 3686 Group. Other members of the group include NGC 3684, NGC 3686, and NGC 3691. A. M. Garcia considers the galaxies NGC 3592, NGC 3626, NGC 3655, NGC 3659, and NGC 3608 as member of the group, named LGG 237. The group is part of the Leo II Groups, a large cloud of galaxies in the Virgo Supercluster.
