= NGC 3684 =

Galaxy in the constellation Leo

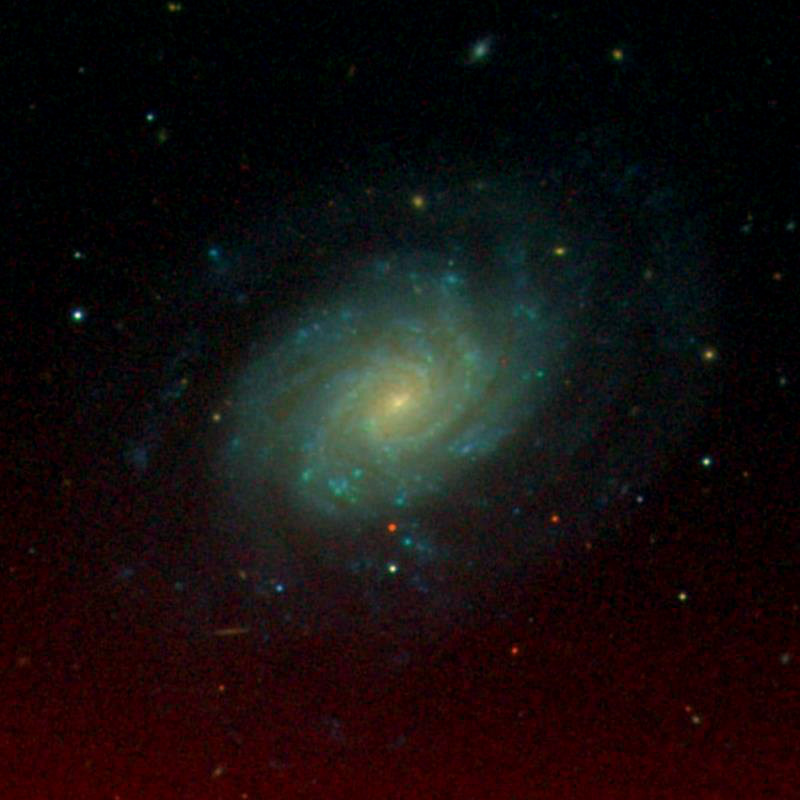
- NGC 3684 imaged by Sloan Digital Sky Survey

Observation data (J2000 epoch)
- Constellation: Leo
- Right ascension: 11^{h} 27^{m} 11.2201^{s}
- Declination: +17° 01′ 48.518″
- Redshift: 0.003879 ± 0.000013
- Heliocentric radial velocity: 1,163 ± 4 km/s
- Distance: 67.1 ± 14.8 Mly (20.6 ± 4.5 Mpc)
- Group or cluster: Leo II Groups
- Apparent magnitude (V): 11.5

Characteristics
- Type: SA(rs)bc
- Size: ~78,000 ly (23.9 kpc) (estimated)
- Apparent size (V): 3.1′ × 2.1′

Other designations
- IRAS 11245+1718, UGC 6453, MCG +03-29-050, PGC 35224, CGCG 096-047

NGC 3684 is a spiral galaxy in the constellation Leo. The galaxy lies about 70 million light years away from Earth, which means, given its apparent dimensions, that NGC 3684 is approximately 80,000 light years across. It was discovered by William Herschel on April 17, 1784.

The galaxy features a bar embedded in an elliptical bulge. From the end of the bar emerge two spiral arms in a grand design pattern. They are smooth although they both feature knots, especially the western one. The arms can be traced for about 300° before fading. There are many bright H-alpha sources near the centre and few HII regions in the arms. The galaxy has an excess of hydrogen. There is a low-surface-brightness outer spiral pattern.

NGC 3684 is a member of the NGC 3686 Group. Other members of the group include NGC 3681, NGC 3686, and NGC 3691. NGC 3681 lies 14 arcminuntes southwest and NGC 3686 14 arcminutes northeast. A. M. Garcia considers the galaxies NGC 3592, NGC 3626, NGC 3655, NGC 3659, and NGC 3608 as member of the group, named LGG 237. The group is part of the Leo II Groups, a large cloud of galaxies in the Virgo Supercluster.
