= NGC 2964 =

Spiral galaxy in the constellation Leo

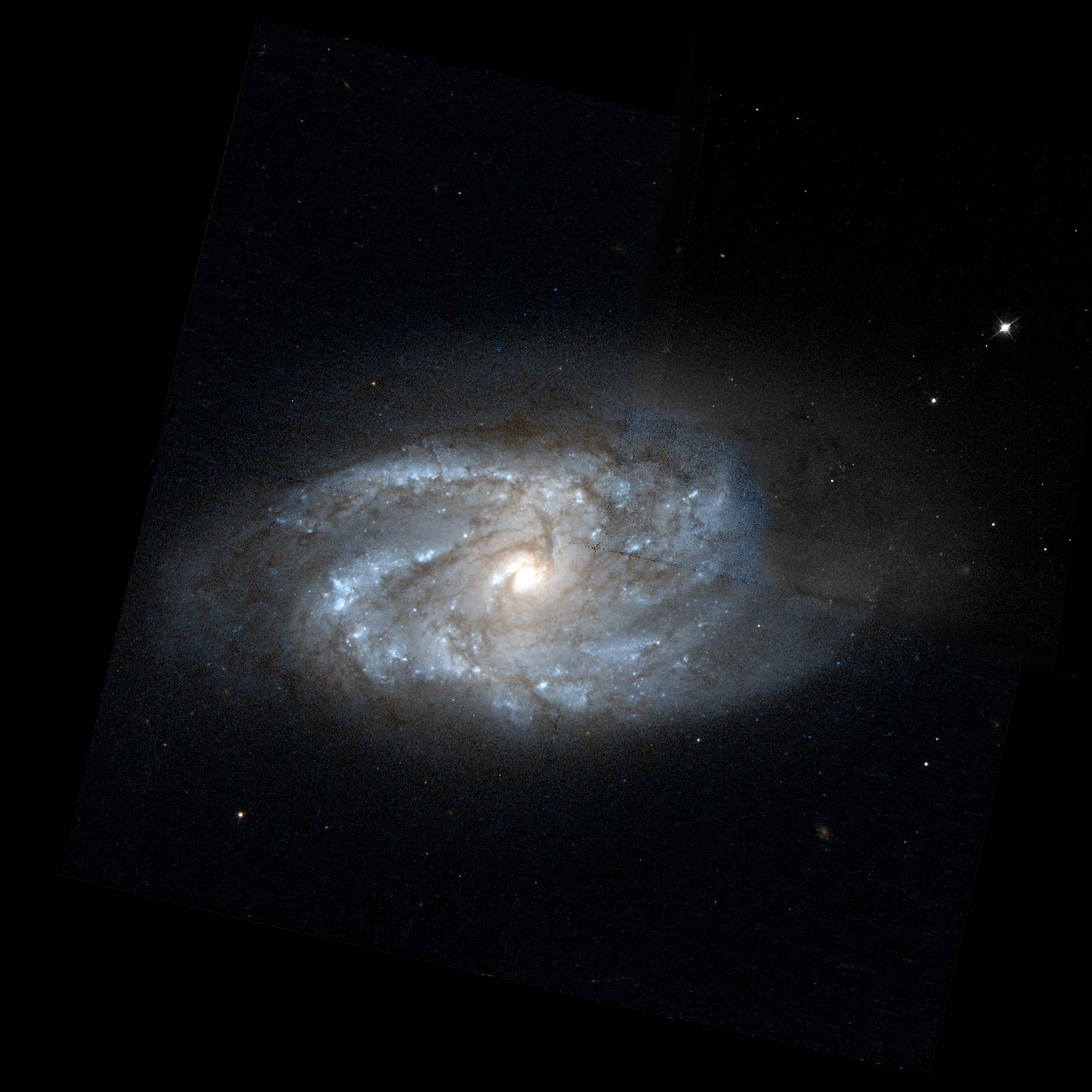
- NGC 2964 by Hubble Space Telescope

Observation data (J2000 epoch)
- Constellation: Leo
- Right ascension: 09^{h} 42^{m} 54.2^{s}
- Declination: 31° 50′ 51″
- Redshift: 0.004430±0.000040
- Heliocentric radial velocity: 1,328±12 km/s
- Distance: 61.0 ± 10.8 Mly (18.7 ± 3.3 Mpc)
- Apparent magnitude (V): 11.2

Characteristics
- Type: SAB(r)bc
- Apparent size (V): 3.0′ × 1.7′

Other designations
- NGC 2964, UGC 5183, MCG +05-23-027, PGC 27777, CGCG 152-056, Mrk 404, B2 0939+32B

NGC 2964 is an intermediate spiral galaxy located in the constellation of Leo. It is located at a distance of about 60 million light years from Earth, which, given its apparent dimensions, means that NGC 2964 is about 60,000 light years across. It was discovered by William Herschel on December 7, 1785.

== Characteristics ==
There is evidence that the galaxy has a weak bar running across the minor axis of the galaxy. The galaxy has four spiral arms, two emerging from ansae at each end of the bar and the others emerging near the centre of the bar, with the arms emerging from the ends of the bar being of higher surface brightness. All but the west arm have knotty appearance. The outer parts of the galaxy present twisted stellar kinematics, but otherwise the rotation is quite regular.

Spiral dust lanes have been observed running towards the centre, where star formation possibly takes place. A circumnuclear ring observed in [OIII]/H-beta could be the site of active star formation. Another indication of a nuclear star forming ring is the detection of double peaked carbon monoxide emission lines. The central region of the galaxy has a stellar population of young-intermediate age, probably created by constant starburst activity that lasted for about 5 billion years. The total star formation rate of NGC 2964 is estimated to be about 4 M_{☉} per year.

The nucleus of NGC 2964 appears to feature HII region activity. The spectrographic study of the nucleus revealed double peaked emission lines, which can be attributed to an ionisation cone created by an active galactic nucleus. In the centre of NGC 2964 is believed to lie a supermassive black hole whose upper mass limit is estimated to be between 1.4 and 24 million M_{☉}.

== Nearby galaxies ==
NGC 2964 is the brightest galaxy in a galaxy group known as the NGC 2964 group. Other members of the group include NGC 2968, NGC 2970, NGC 3003, NGC 3011, NGC 3021. Other nearby galaxies include NGC 3118, NGC 3067, NGC 3032, NGC 3026, and their galaxy groups. NGC 2964 forms a non-interacting pair with NGC 2968, which lies 5.8 arcminutes away. A hydrogen bridge has been found to connect the two galaxies, while a tail extends towards NGC 2970.

== Supernova ==
One supernova has been observed in NGC 2964: SN 2022mji (Type II, mag. 17.361) was discovered by ATLAS on 9 June 2022.
