= NGC 3604 =

Spiral galaxy in the constellation Leo

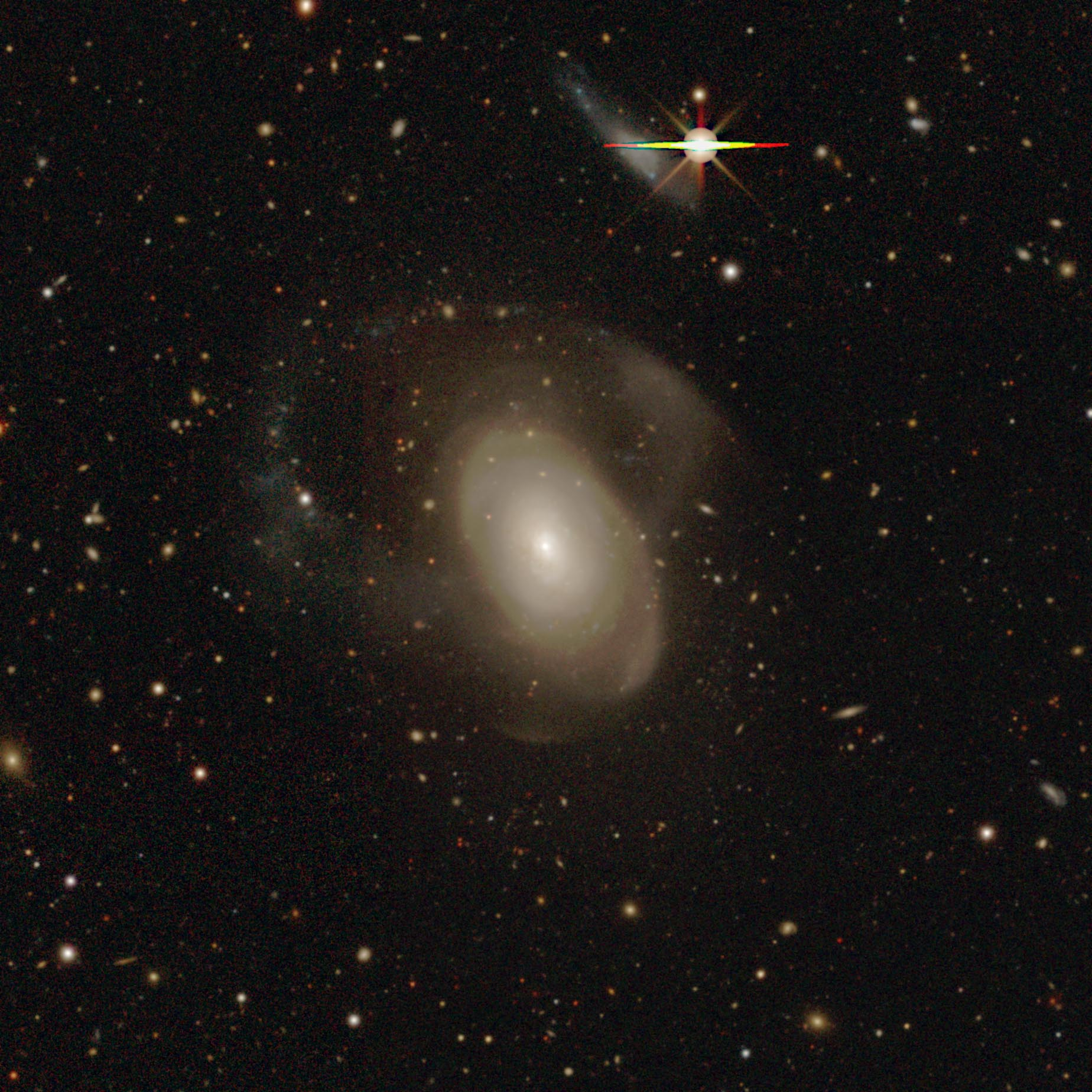
- NGC 3604 by Legacy Surveys

Observation data (J2000 epoch)
- Constellation: Leo
- Right ascension: 11^{h} 17^{m} 30.1933^{s}
- Declination: +04° 33′ 20.128″
- Redshift: 0.005220 ± 0.000009
- Heliocentric radial velocity: 1,565 ± 3 km/s
- Distance: 110 ± 13 Mly (33.9 ± 4.0 Mpc)
- Apparent magnitude (V): 11.9

Characteristics
- Type: SA(s)a pec
- Apparent size (V): 2.1′ × 1.7′
- Notable features: off-center ring

Other designations
- NGC 3611, UGC 6305, CGCG 039-103, MCG +01-29-026, PGC 34478

NGC 3604, also known as NGC 3611, is an unbarred spiral galaxy located in the constellation Leo. It is located at a distance of about 110 million light years from Earth, which, given its apparent dimensions, means that NGC 3604 is about 85,000 light years across. It was discovered by William Herschel on January 27, 1786. William Herschel observed the galaxy again on December 30, 1786, but catalogued it as a different entry, and thus the galaxy has a duplicate entry in the New General Catalogue.

NGC 3604 has a small bright nucleus with inner spiral arms. There is evidense of star formation near the centre. There are thin smooth spiral arms with little evidense of recent star formation at the outer regions of the galaxy. The galaxy has a faint elliptical ring extending for 189 by 121 arcseconds that is off-center and, if circular, it is perpendicular to the galactic disk. The ring is nearly continuous and has knots. It consists of two shells in both sides of the galaxy, connected with an incomplete blue arc. Its brightest part is at the northwest part of the galaxy, towards the direction of UGC 6306. It is possible the ring is the result of the interaction with a satellite disk galaxy, which lead to its disruption.

NGC 3611 is member of a galaxy group known as LGG 233. Other members of the group include NGC 3630, NGC 3640, NGC 3641, NGC 3664 and NGC 3664A. NGC 3604 forms a pair with UGC 6306, which is located 3 arcminutes north of it. A faint hydrogen bridge seems to connect the two galaxies.
