= NGC 3346 =

Spiral galaxy

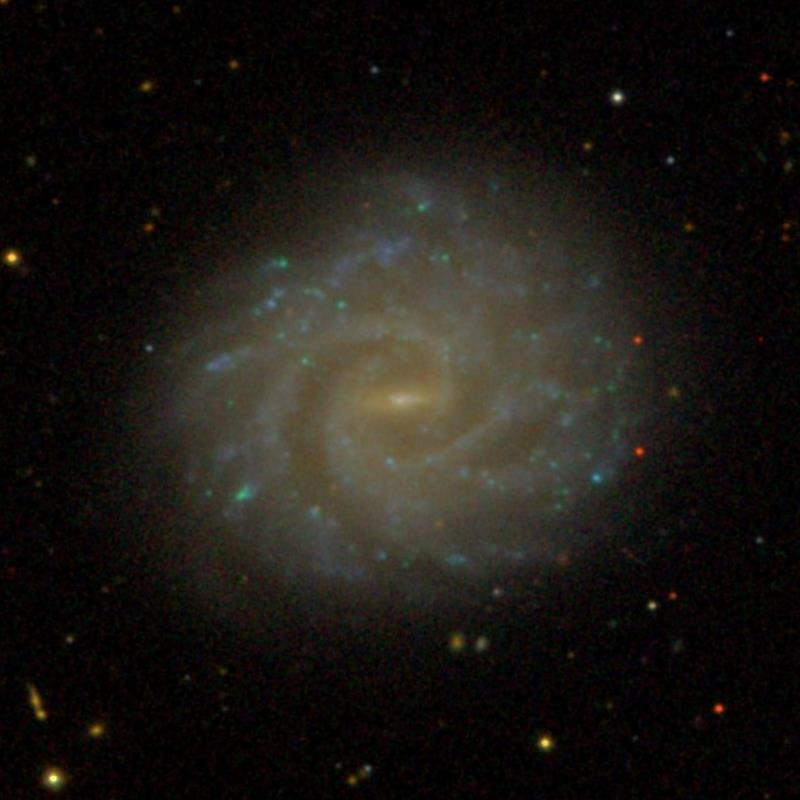

Observation data
- Constellation: Leo
- Right ascension: 10^{h} 43^{m} 38^{s}
- Declination: +14° 52′ 18″
- Distance: 53,000,000 LY
- Apparent magnitude (V): 12.8

Characteristics
- Apparent size (V): 2.64' x 2.2'

Other designations
- IRAS 10410+1507, LEDA 31982, UGC 5842

NGC 3346 is a barred spiral galaxy in Leo. It is classified as a type SAc galaxy. It was discovered by William Herschel in 1784. It is estimated to be 16.67 kiloparsecs in diameter.

NGC 3346 is part of the NGC 3338 Group. This group also contains NGC 3338, NGC 3389, UGC 5832, and MRK 1263.
