= NGC 3512 =

Galaxy in the constellation Leo

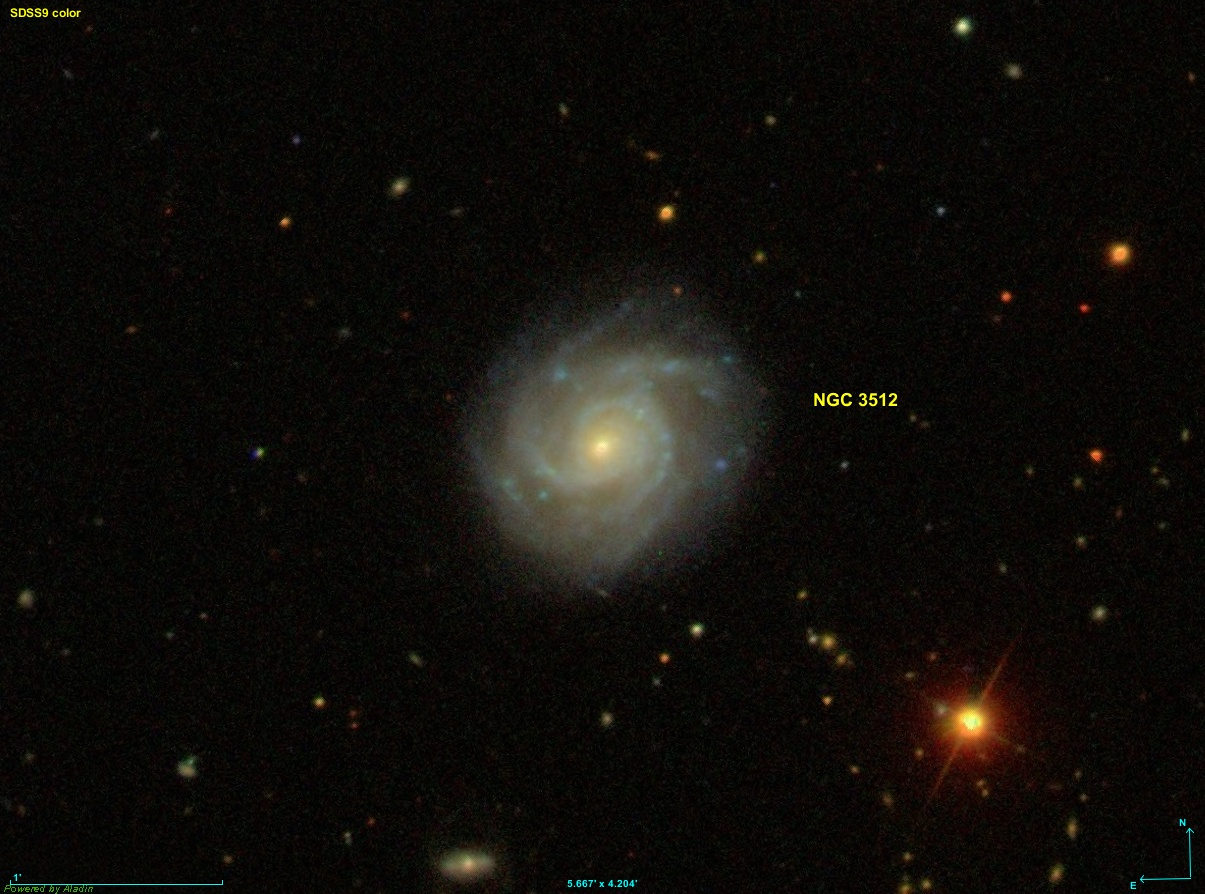
- NGC 3512 imaged by SDSS

Observation data (J2000 epoch)
- Constellation: Leo
- Right ascension: 11^{h} 04^{m} 02.9449^{s}
- Declination: +28° 02′ 12.888″
- Redshift: 0.004580±0.00000200
- Heliocentric radial velocity: 1,373±1 km/s
- Distance: 113.50 ± 11.20 Mly (34.800 ± 3.434 Mpc)
- Group or cluster: NGC 3504 group (LGG 227)
- Apparent magnitude (V): 12.98

Characteristics
- Type: SAB(rs)c
- Size: ~56,800 ly (17.41 kpc) (estimated)
- Apparent size (V): 1.6′ × 1.5′

Other designations
- IRAS 11013+2818, 2MASX J11040298+2802125, UGC 6128, MCG +05-26-041, PGC 33432, CGCG 155-051

NGC 3512 is an intermediate spiral galaxy in the constellation of Leo. Its velocity with respect to the cosmic microwave background is 1,677±21 km/s, which corresponds to a Hubble distance of 80.7 ± 5.7 Mly (24.73 ± 1.76 Mpc). However, four non-redshift measurements give a farther mean distance of 113.50 ± 11.20 Mly (34.800 ± 3.434 Mpc). It was discovered by German-British astronomer William Herschel on 11 April 1785.

NGC 3512 is a LINER galaxy, i.e. a galaxy whose nucleus has an emission spectrum characterized by broad lines of weakly ionized atoms.

== NGC 3504 group ==
NGC 3512 is a member of the NGC 3504 Group (also known as LGG 227), which is a member of the Leo II Groups, a series of galaxies and galaxy clusters strung out from the western edge of the Virgo Supercluster. There are eight other galaxies in the group, including NGC 3380, NGC 3400, NGC 3414, NGC 3451, NGC 3504, UGC 5921 and UGC 5958. This NGC 3504 group is also mentioned by Abraham Mahtessian in his research paper published in 1998.

== Supernova ==
One supernova has been observed in NGC 3512:

- SN 2001fv (Type II, mag. 16.4) was discovered by British amateur astronomer Mark Armstrong on 3 November 2001.

== See also ==
- List of NGC objects (3001–4000)
