= NGC 3686 =

Galaxy in the constellation Leo

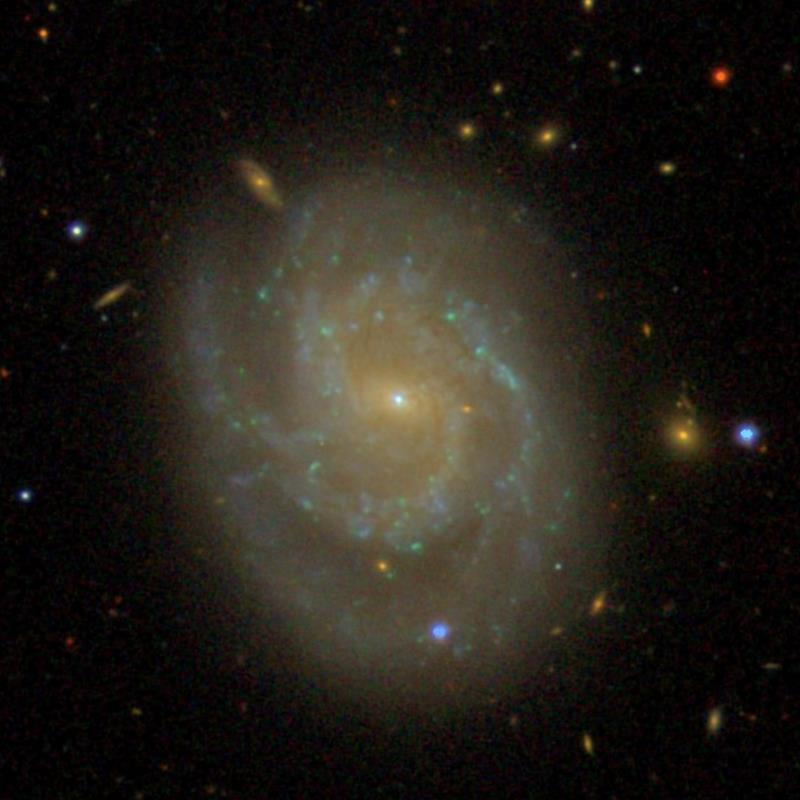
- SDSS image of NGC 3686

Observation data (J2000 epoch)
- Constellation: Leo
- Right ascension: 11^{h} 27^{m} 43.942^{s}
- Declination: +17° 13′ 26.61″
- Redshift: 0.003853
- Heliocentric radial velocity: 1153 km/s
- Distance: 68 Mly (21 Mpc)
- Apparent magnitude (V): 11.43
- Apparent magnitude (B): 12.00

Characteristics
- Type: SB(s)bc
- Apparent size (V): 3.1′ × 2.4′

Other designations
- NGC 3686, UGC 6460, MCG +03-29-051, PGC 35268

NGC 3686 is a spiral galaxy in the constellation of Leo. It has two spiral arms and a weak bar.

It forms a quartet with three other spiral galaxies, NGCs 3681, 3684, and 3691. It was discovered on 14 March 1784 by William Herschel. It is a member of the NGC 3607 Group of galaxies, which is a member of the Leo II Groups, a series of galaxies and galaxy clusters strung out from the right edge of the Virgo Supercluster.
