= NGC 3705 =

Spiral galaxy in the constellation Leo

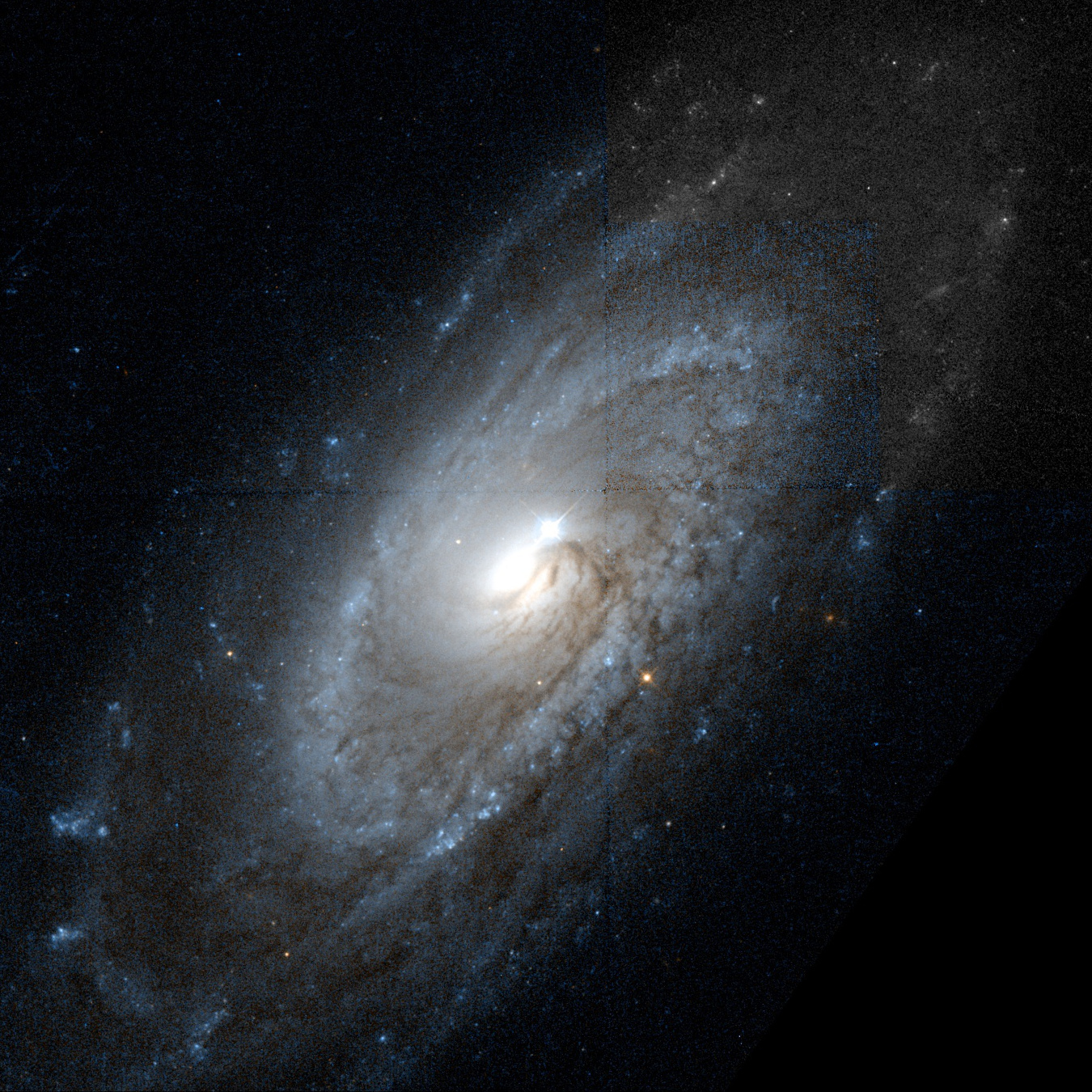
- Hubble Space Telescope image of NGC 3705

Observation data (J2000 epoch)
- Constellation: Leo
- Right ascension: 11^{h} 30^{m} 07^{s}
- Declination: +09° 16′ 35″
- Redshift: 0.003396
- Heliocentric radial velocity: 1018 ± 1 km/s
- Apparent magnitude (V): 11.07
- Apparent magnitude (B): 11.86

Characteristics
- Type: SAB(r)ab

Other designations
- NGC 3705, LEDA 35440, UGC 6498

NGC 3705 is a barred spiral galaxy in the constellation Leo. It was discovered by William Herschel on Jan 18, 1784. It is a member of the Leo II Groups, a series of galaxies and galaxy clusters strung out from the right edge of the Virgo Supercluster.

== Supernova ==
One supernova has been observed in NGC 3705:

- SN 2022xxf (Type Ic-BL, mag. 15.5) was discovered by Kōichi Itagaki on 17 October 2022.

== See also ==
- List of NGC objects (3001–4000)

== Gallery ==
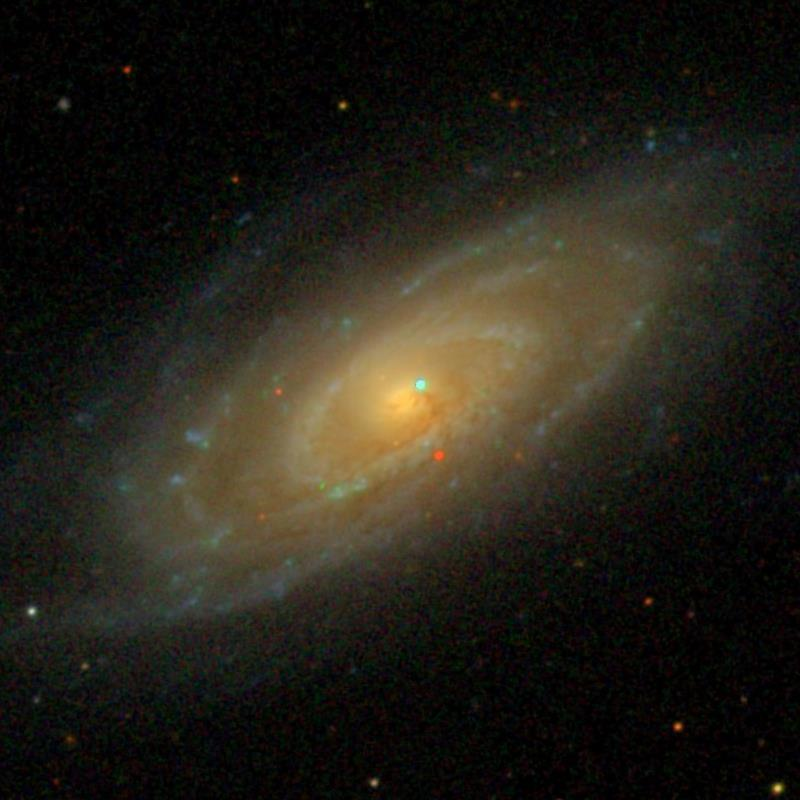
NGC 3705 (SDSS DR14)
