= NGC 3605 =

Galaxy in the constellation Leo

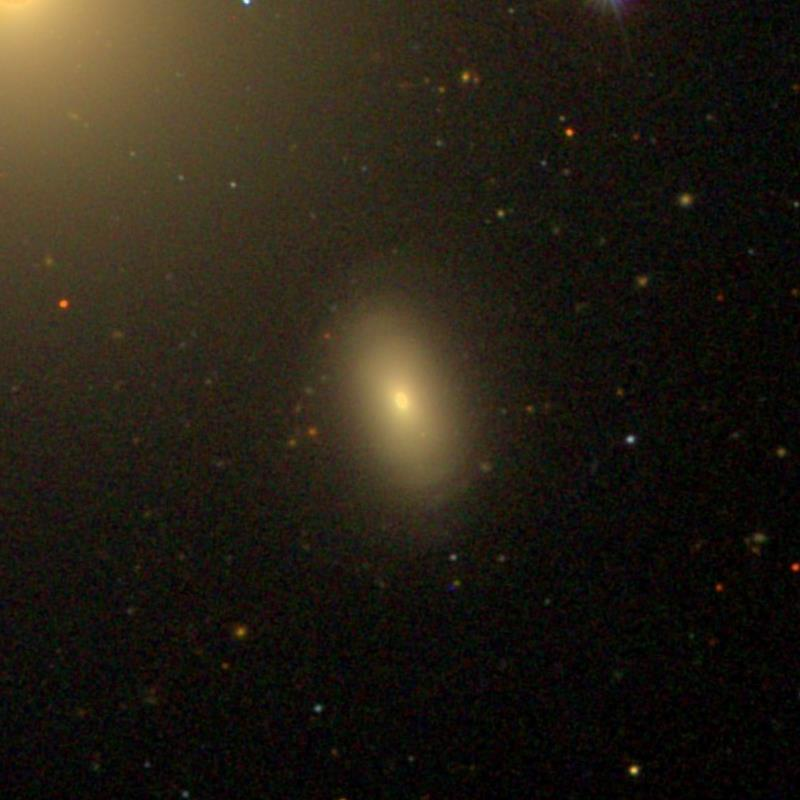
- SDSS image of NGC 3605

Observation data (J2000 epoch)
- Constellation: Leo
- Right ascension: 11^{h} 16^{m} 46.622^{s}
- Declination: +18° 01′ 01.71″
- Redshift: 0.002228
- Heliocentric radial velocity: 667 ± 29 km/s
- Distance: 66 Mly (20.1 Mpc)
- Apparent magnitude (V): 12.15
- Absolute magnitude (V): −19.36

Characteristics
- Type: E4-5

Other designations
- UGC 6297, MCG +03-29-020, PGC 34415

NGC 3605 is an elliptical galaxy located in the constellation Leo. It was discovered on March 14, 1784, by the astronomer William Herschel.

A relatively low-mass galaxy, it is a member of the Leo II Group of galaxies, including NGC 3607 among others.
