= NGC 3389 =

Galaxy in the constellation Leo

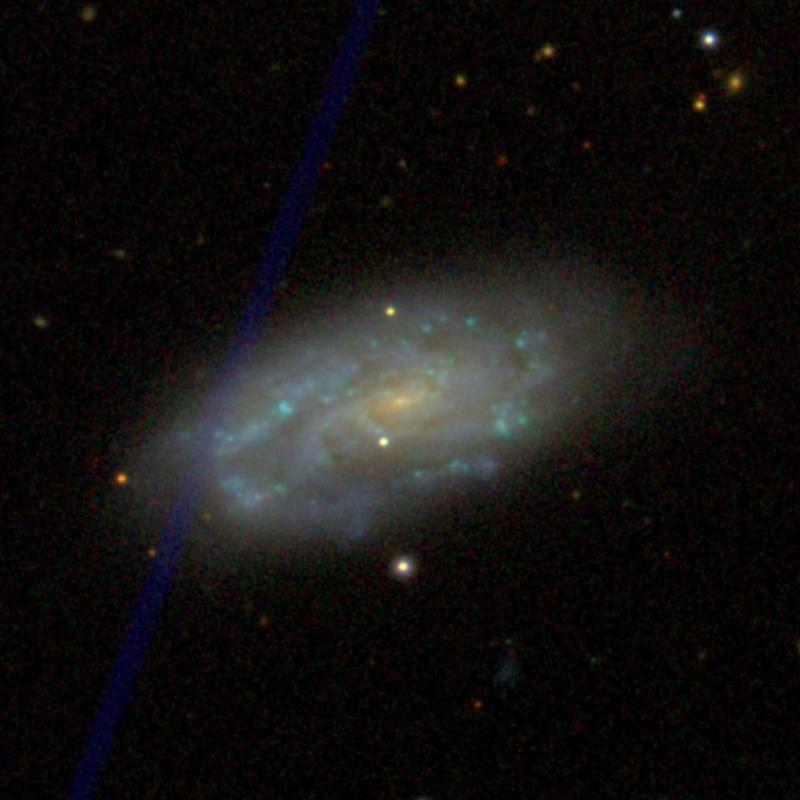
- NGC 3389 imaged by SDSS

Observation data (J2000 epoch)
- Constellation: Leo
- Right ascension: 10^{h} 48^{m} 27.9204^{s}
- Declination: +12° 31′ 59.897″
- Redshift: 0.004346±0.000007
- Heliocentric radial velocity: 1,303±2 km/s
- Distance: 71.70 ± 3.01 Mly (21.983 ± 0.924 Mpc)
- Group or cluster: HOLM 212, NGC 3338 Group (LGG 214)
- Apparent magnitude (V): 12.3B

Characteristics
- Type: SA(s)c
- Size: ~81,000 ly (24.83 kpc) (estimated)
- Apparent size (V): 2.8′ × 1.3′

Other designations
- HOLM 212C, NGC 3373, UGC 5914, MCG +02-28-013, PGC 32306, CGCG 066-022

NGC 3389 is a spiral galaxy in the constellation of Leo. Its velocity with respect to the cosmic microwave background is 1,651±24 km/s, which corresponds to a Hubble distance of 79.4 ± 5.7 Mly (24.35 ± 1.74 Mpc). However, 24 non-redshift measurements give a closer mean distance of 71.70 ± 3.01 Mly (21.983 ± 0.924 Mpc). It was discovered by German-British astronomer William Herschel on 11 March 1784. It was also observed by John Herschel on 23 March 1830, causing it to be listed a second time in the New General Catalogue as NGC 3373.

== Holm 212 and NGC 3338 groups ==
NGC 3389, Messier 105, and NGC 3384 are listed together as Holm 212 in Erik Holmberg's A Study of Double and Multiple Galaxies Together with Inquiries into some General Metagalactic Problems, published in 1937.

According to A. M. Garcia, NGC 3389 is a member of the NGC 3338 Group (also known as LGG 214). In addition to NGC 3338, this galaxy group includes at least three other galaxies: NGC 3346, UGC 5832, and MRK 1263.

== Supernovae ==
Two supernovae have been observed in NGC 3389.

- SN 1967C (Type Ia, mag. 13) was discovered by A. D. Chuadze on 28 February 1967, and independently discovered by Miklós Lovas on 10 March 1967.
- SN 2009md (Type II, mag. 16.5) was discovered by Kōichi Itagaki on 4 December 2009.

== See also ==
- List of NGC objects (3001–4000)
