= NGC 3504 =

Galaxy in the constellation Leo Minor

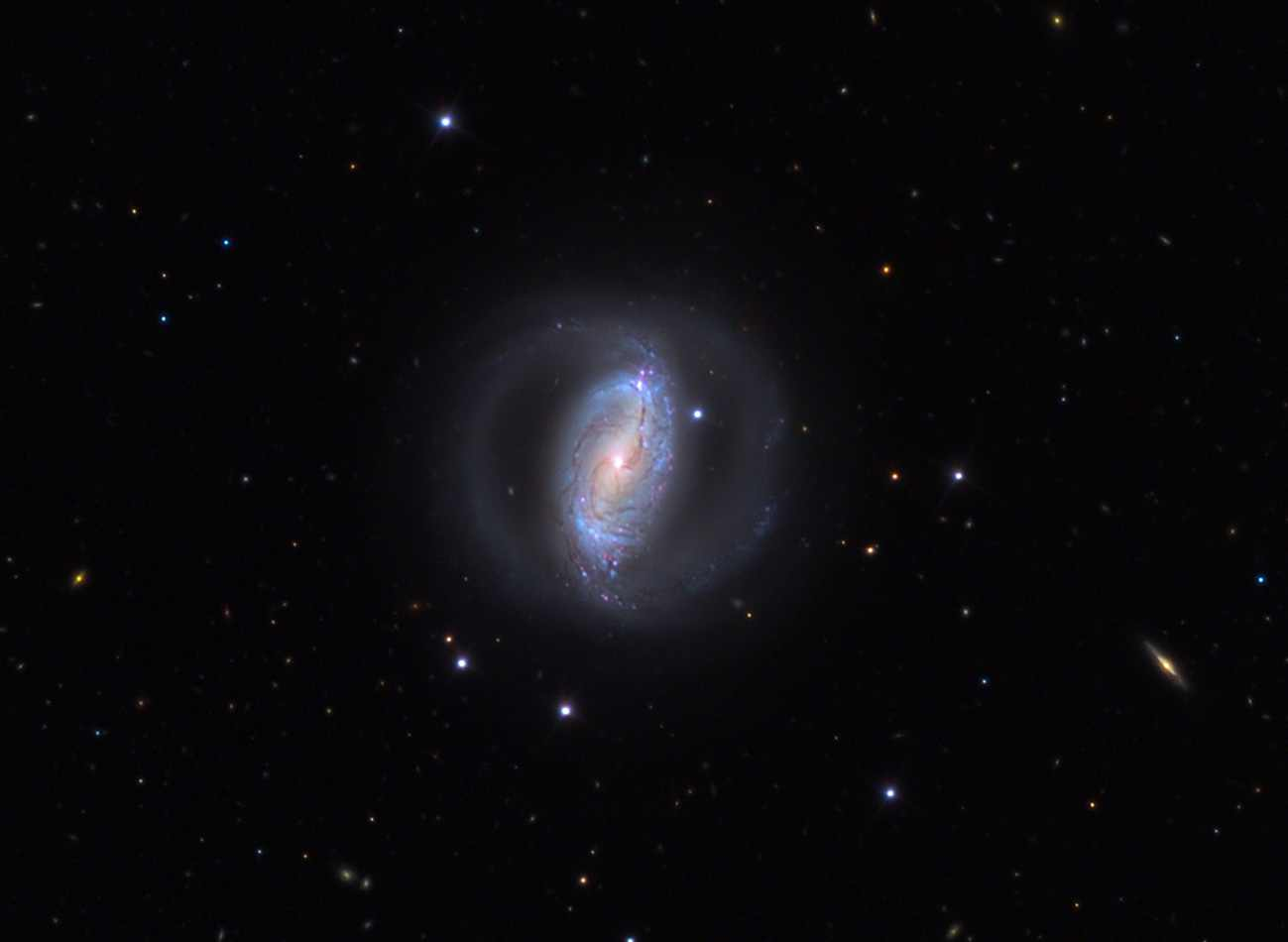
- NGC 3504 imaged by the Mount Lemmon Observatory SkyCenter using the 0.8m Schulman Telescope

Observation data (J2000 epoch)
- Constellation: Leo Minor
- Right ascension: 11^{h} 03^{m} 11.2388^{s}
- Declination: +27° 58′ 21.344″
- Redshift: 0.005074±0.00000334
- Heliocentric radial velocity: 1,521±1 km/s
- Apparent magnitude (V): 10.9

Characteristics
- Type: (R)SAB(s)ab
- Apparent size (V): 2.7′ × 2.1′

Other designations
- IRAS 11004+2814, 2MASX J11031119+2758207, UGC 6118, MCG +05-26-039, PGC 33371, CGCG 155-049

NGC 3504 is a barred spiral galaxy in the constellation Leo Minor. It has a Hubble distance corresponding to 88 million light-years and was discovered by German-British astronomer William Herschel on 11 April 1785.

== Observations ==
NGC 3504 is classified as a type (R_{1}')SAB(rs)ab galaxy. It has a bright point-like nucleus embedded inside its galactic budge that is crossed by a thin bar. It has spiral arms found wrapping around its inner ring which then peels off to form an outer, broken pseudo-ring. The galaxy shows little evidence of star formation. The luminosity class of NGC 3504 is I-II, with a broad HI line containing regions of ionized hydrogen. Additionally, it is classified as a starburst galaxy.

According to Hubble Space Telescope, a star-forming disk has been found around the nucleus of NGC 3504, which the size of the disk's axis is estimated to be 200 pc (~650 light years). Compared with other barred spiral galaxies, NGC 3504 is in an early phase of its evolution.

The mass of NGC 3504 has been difficult to narrow down, but it is believed to be between 2.5*10^{9} M⊙ and 9*10^{9} M⊙. The supermassive black hole in NGC 3504 is estimated to be 10^{7.8} M○ (or 63 million solar masses), according to near-infrared K-band brightness measurements for the galaxy's budge.

== Supernovae ==
Two supernovae have been observed in NGC 3504:

- SN 1998cf (type unknown, mag. 15) was discovered in March 1998 by Eric Emsellem via CCD images captured at Canada-France-Hawaii Observatory and also by Karl Gordon and Geoffrey Clayton from Louisiana State University.
- SN 2001ac (type gap, mag. 18.2) was discovered by LOTOSS (Lick Observatory and Tenagra Observatory Supernova Searches) on 12 March 2001. This supernova was initially thought to be Type IIn or a luminous blue variable, but later analysis concluded that it was a calcium-rich supernova, sometimes referred to as a "gap" transient.

== NGC 3504 group ==
NGC 3504 is the brightest member of the NGC 3504 Group (also known as LGG 227), which is a member of the Leo II Groups, a series of galaxies and galaxy clusters strung out from the right edge of the Virgo Supercluster. There are eight other galaxies in the group including NGC 3380, NGC 3400, NGC 3414, NGC 3451, NGC 3512, UGC 5921 and UGC 5958. This NGC 3504 group is also mentioned by Abraham Mahtessian in his research paper published in 1998.
