= NGC 3666 =

Galaxy in the constellation Leo

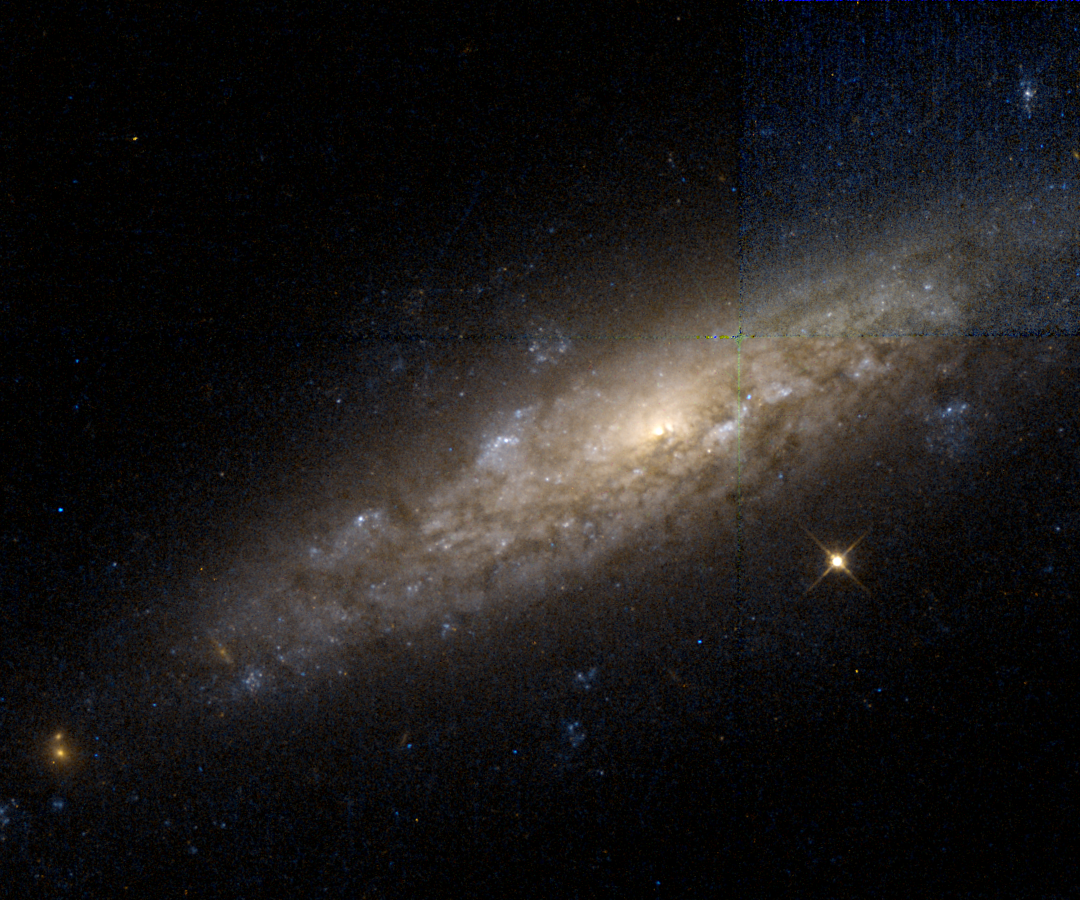
- Hubble Space Telescope image of NGC 3666

Observation data (J2000 epoch)
- Constellation: Leo
- Right ascension: 11^{h} 24^{m} 26^{s}
- Declination: +11° 20′ 31″
- Redshift: 0.003536
- Heliocentric radial velocity: 1018 ± 1 km/s
- Apparent magnitude (B): 12.5

Characteristics
- Type: SA(rs)c

Other designations
- NGC 3666, LEDA 35043, UGC 6420

NGC 3666 is an unbarred spiral galaxy in the constellation Leo. It was discovered by William Herschel on March 15, 1784. It is a member of the Leo II Groups, a series of galaxies and galaxy clusters strung out from the right edge of the Virgo Supercluster.

== See also ==
- List of NGC objects (3001-4000)

== Gallery ==
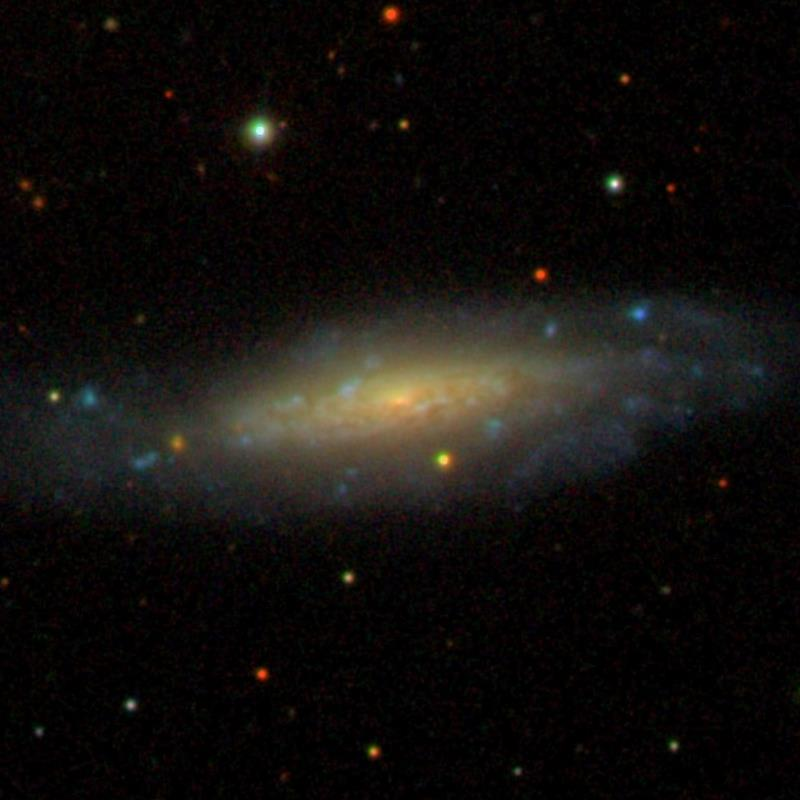
NGC 3666 (SDSS DR14)
