= SN 2019np =

Supernova in NGC 3254

- Event type: Supernova
- Type Ia
- Constellation: Leo Minor
- Right ascension: 10^{h} 29^{m} 21.980^{s}
- Declination: +29° 30′ 38.30″
- Epoch: J2000
- Distance: 107.0 ± 22.2 Mly (32.80 ± 6.8 Mpc)
- Redshift: 0.00452
- Host: NGC 3254
- Colour (B-V): −0.06±0.03
- Peak apparent magnitude: 13.62±0.15

SN 2019np was a Type Ia supernova event in NGC 3254, which is an unbarred spiral galaxy in the northern Constellation of Leo Minor. Based on the Tully–Fisher relation, this galaxy is located at a distance of 107.0 ± 22.2 million light-years (32.80 ± 6.8 Mpc) from the Milky Way. This supernova was discovered January 9, 2019 by Kōichi Itagaki, and reached maximum two weeks later. It was the brightest supernova observed in the year 2019.

== Observations ==
This supernova was discovered by Japanese amateur astronomer Kōichi Itagaki on January 9, 2019, using a 0.35-m telescope. The early spectrum was consistent with a Type Ia supernova. On January 11, it was measured at an apparent visual magnitude of 16.68 with an estimated two weeks until maximum. It reached visual magnitude 13.6 at maximum.

The spectral evolution of SN 2019np followed the normal pattern for a Type Ia supernova. The velocity of the ejecta was around 10,200 km/s at maximum, as measured from ionized silicon. Early observations showed an infrared excess, which may be explained by a collision between the ejecta and a companion star. The data is best explained by a solar mass companion on the main sequence.

The explosion data is most consistent with a carbon-oxygen white dwarf that evolved from a star with five times the mass of the Sun. This compact object accreted matter from its companion until its mass approached the Chandrasekhar limit, when it detonated. The explosion generated an estimated 0.66±0.05 M_{☉} of synthesized nickel.
