= NGC 2968 =

Galaxy in the constellation Leo

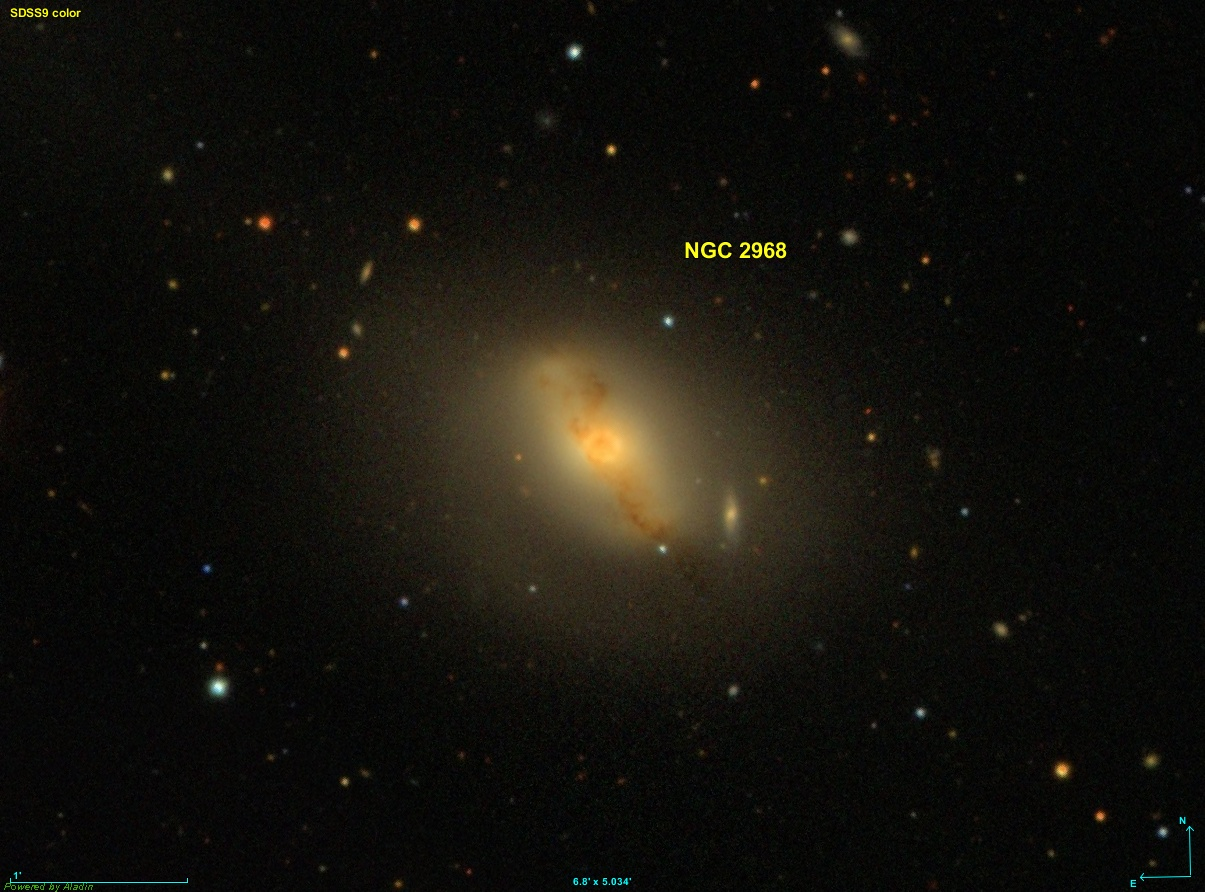
- NGC 2968 imaged by SDSS

Observation data (J2000 epoch)
- Constellation: Leo
- Right ascension: 09^{h} 43^{m} 12.0423^{s}
- Declination: +31° 55′ 43.503″
- Redshift: 0.005132±0.00000919
- Heliocentric radial velocity: 1,539±3 km/s
- Distance: 45.69 ± 13.40 Mly (14.010 ± 4.107 Mpc)
- Group or cluster: NGC 7329 group (LGG 462)
- Apparent magnitude (V): 12.9g

Characteristics
- Type: SB C
- Size: ~35,200 ly (10.78 kpc) (estimated)
- Apparent size (V): 1.89′ × 1.30′

Other designations
- 2MASX J09431201+3155438, UGC 5190, MCG +05-23-029, PGC 27800, CGCG 152-058

NGC 2968 is a barred spiral galaxy in the constellation of Leo. Its velocity with respect to the cosmic microwave background is 1,804±19 km/s, which corresponds to a Hubble distance of 86.8 ± 6.1 Mly (26.61 ± 1.88 Mpc). However, five non-redshift measurements give a much closer mean distance of 45.69 ± 13.40 Mly (14.010 ± 4.107 Mpc). It was discovered by German-British astronomer William Herschel on 7 December 1785.

NGC 2968 has a possible active galactic nucleus, i.e. it has a compact region at the center of a galaxy that emits a significant amount of energy across the electromagnetic spectrum, with characteristics indicating that this luminosity is not produced by the stars.

== Supernova ==
One supernova has been observed in NGC 2968:

- SN 1970L (Type Ib/c, mag. 15.5) was discovered by Swiss astronomer Paul Wild on 31 October 1970. The supernova was found on the connecting bridge between NGC 2968 and NGC 2970, implying that the progenitor of SN 1970L was likely to have been accelerated by the tidal interaction of the two galaxies.

== Compact galaxy group ==
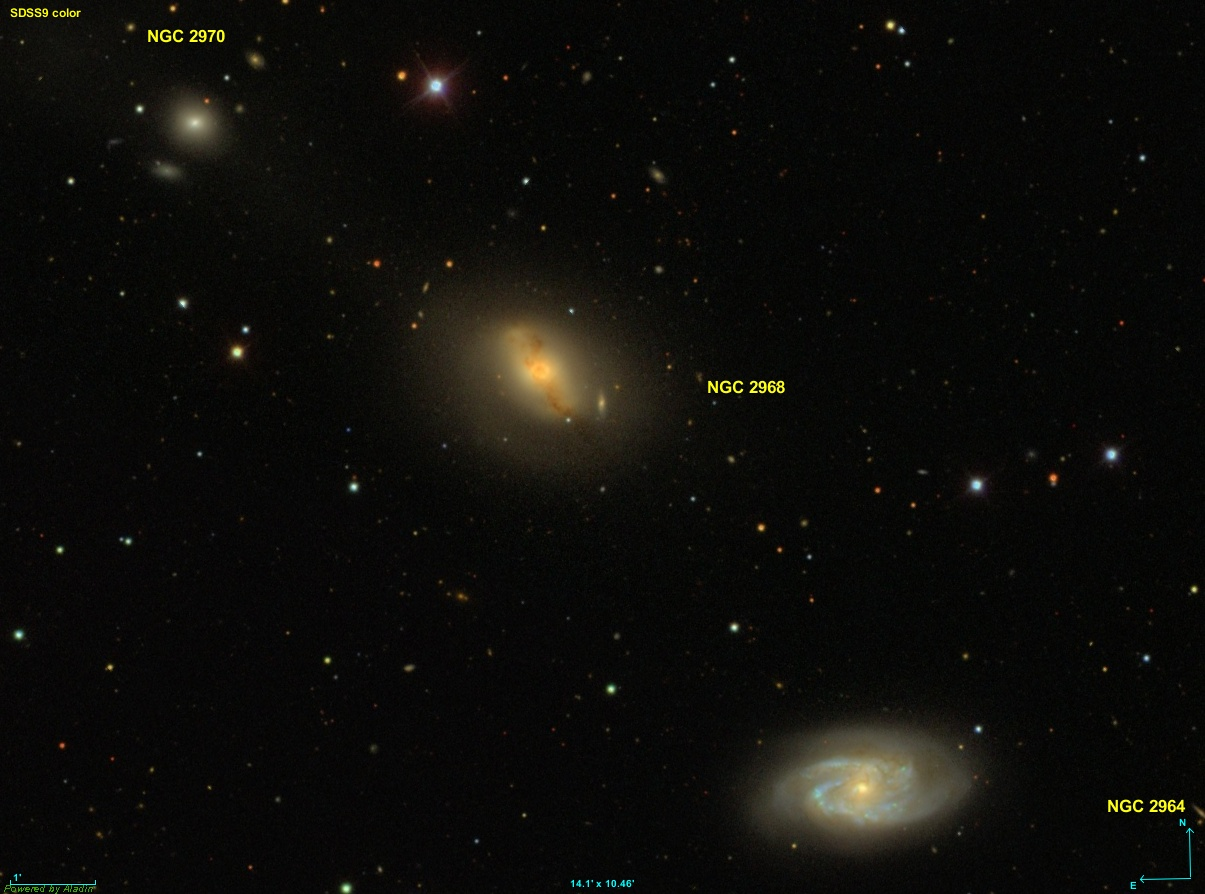
NGC 2970 (center) with NGC 2970 (upper left) and NGC 2964 (lower right)

NGC 2968, NGC 2970, and NGC 2964 comprise the compact galaxy group known as RSCG 34.

== See also ==
- List of NGC objects (2001–3000)
