= NGC 3254 =

Spiral galaxy in the constellation Leo Minor

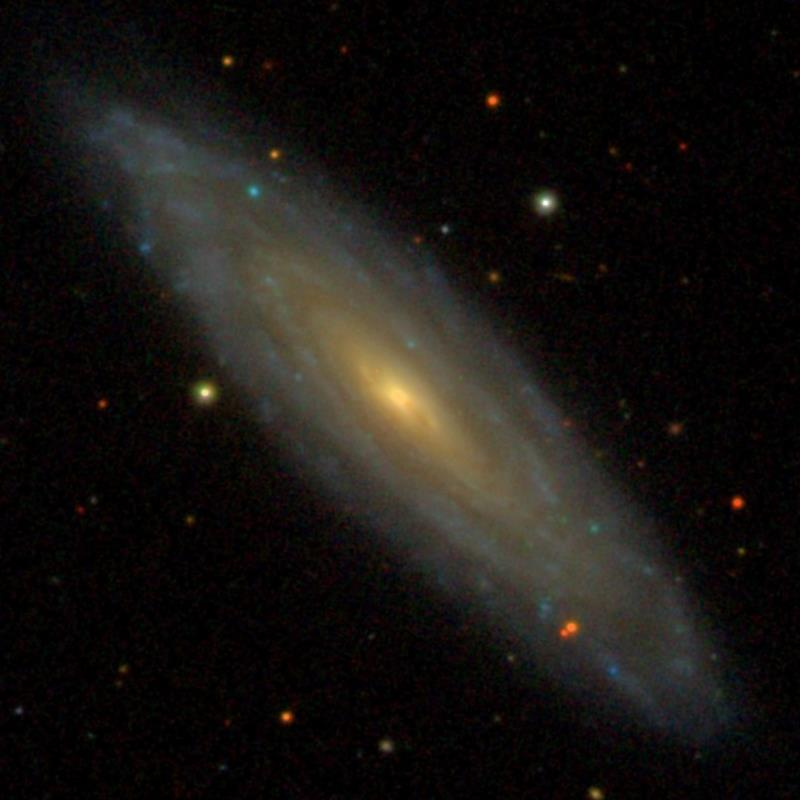
- SDSS image of NGC 3254

Observation data (J2000 epoch)
- Constellation: Leo Minor
- Right ascension: 10^{h} 29^{m} 19.922^{s}
- Declination: +29° 29′ 29.18″
- Redshift: 0.004556
- Heliocentric radial velocity: 1363 ± 10 km/s
- Apparent magnitude (V): 11.60
- Apparent magnitude (B): 12.29

Characteristics
- Type: SA(s)bc
- Size: ~175,000 ly (53.65 kpc) (estimated)
- Apparent size (V): 5.10′ × 0.90′

Other designations
- IRAS F10265+2944, UGC 5685, MCG +05-25-018, PGC 30895, CGCG 154-020

NGC 3254 is a spiral galaxy in the constellation Leo Minor. It was discovered by German-British astronomer William Herschel on March 13, 1785. It is a member of the NGC 3254 Group of galaxies, which is a member of the Leo II Groups, a series of galaxies and galaxy clusters strung out from the right edge of the Virgo Supercluster.

== Supernovae ==
Two supernovae have been observed in NGC 3254:

- SN 1941B (type unknown, mag. 15.1) was discovered by Josef J. Johnson on 25 March 1941. (Note: Some sources incorrectly list the discovery date as 28 March 1941.)
- SN 2019np (Type Ia, mag. 17.8) was discovered by Kōichi Itagaki on 9 January 2019. This supernova reached magnitude 13, making it the brightest observed in the year 2019.

== Gallery ==
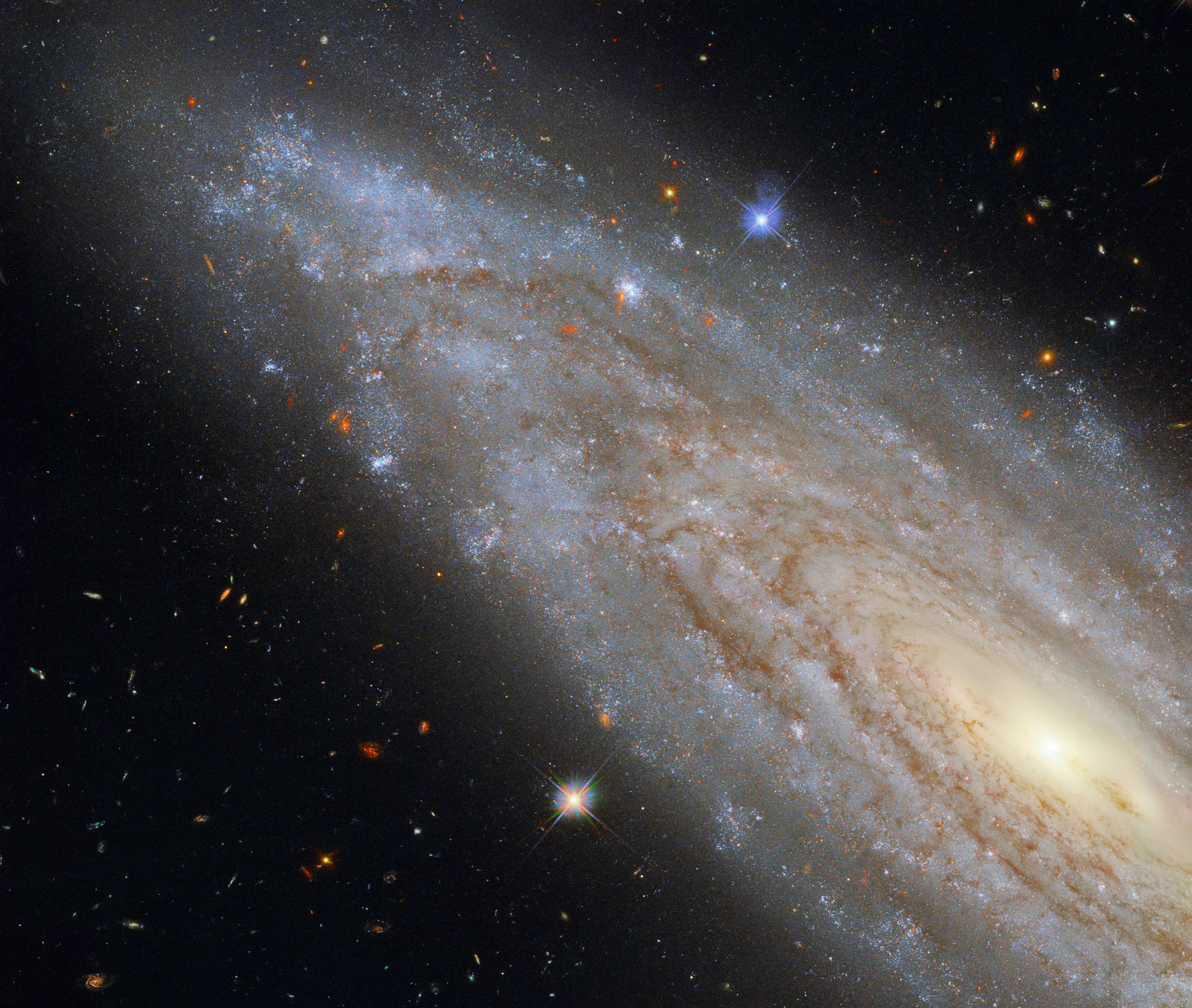
NGC 3254 imaged by the Hubble Space Telescope

== See also ==
- List of NGC objects (3001–4000)
