= NGC 3640 =

Elliptical galaxy in the constellation Leo

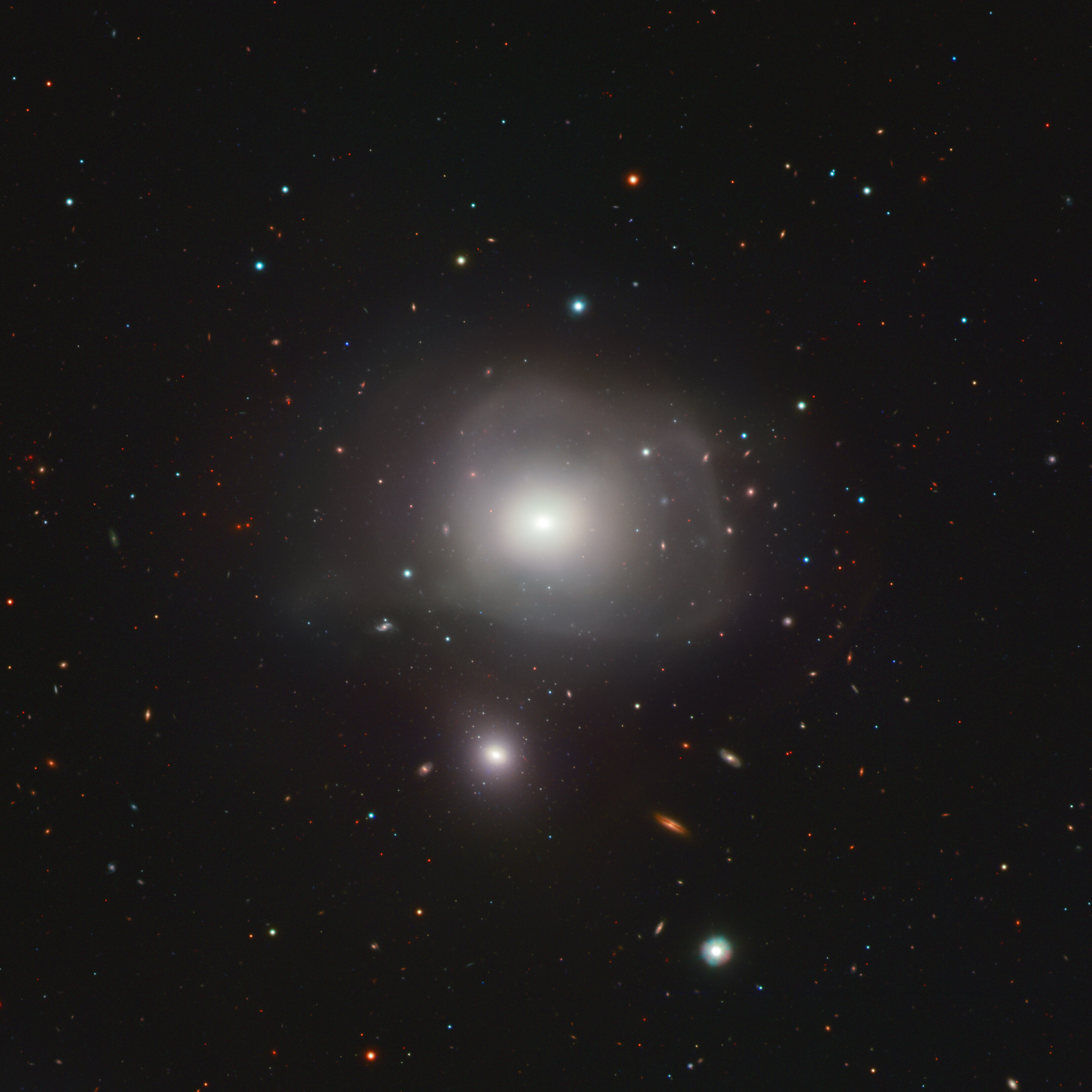
- VLT Survey Telescope image of NGC 3640 and NGC 3641 (bottom)

Observation data (J2000 epoch)
- Constellation: Leo
- Right ascension: 11^{h} 21^{m} 06.8^{s}
- Declination: +03° 14′ 05″
- Redshift: 0.004330±0.000017
- Heliocentric radial velocity: 1,298±5 km/s
- Distance: 75.4 ± 25 Mly (23.1 ± 7.7 Mpc)
- Apparent magnitude (V): 10.3

Characteristics
- Type: E3
- Apparent size (V): 4.0′ × 3.2′

Other designations
- NGC 3640, UGC 6368, MCG +01-29-033, PGC 34778, CGCG 039-130

NGC 3640 is an elliptical galaxy located in the constellation of Leo. It is located at a distance of circa 75 million light years from Earth, which, given its apparent dimensions, means that NGC 3640 is about 90,000 light years across. It was discovered by William Herschel on February 23, 1784. It is a member of the NGC 3640 Group of galaxies, which is a member of the Leo II Groups, a series of galaxies and galaxy clusters strung out from the right edge of the Virgo Supercluster.

It lies 2 degrees south of Sigma Leonis and is a member of the Herschel 400 Catalogue. It is condensed and can be spotted with a small telescope from suburban skies.

== Characteristics ==
NGC 3640 is an elliptical galaxy with a highly disturbed stellar component. The galaxy features boxy isophotes, and patchy shell-like features. These features indicate a recent merger with a smaller gas-poor galaxy. A dust lane is observed along the minor-axis, spanning 30 arcseconds in a north-south direction. The galaxy has a high rotational velocity, estimated to be 120 ± 10 km/s, higher than that of other elliptical galaxies of similar luminosity. The HI mass of the galaxy is estimated to be 1.85×10^{7} M_{☉} and the mass of HII less than 7.44×10^{7} M_{☉}.

In the centre of NGC 3640 lies a supermassive black hole whose mass is estimated to be roughly 100 million (10^{7.99 ± 0.39)} M_{☉} based on the Sérsic profile.

== Nearby galaxies ==
NGC 3640 is the foremost galaxy in a galaxy group known as the NGC 3640 group. Other members of the group include NGC 3630, NGC 3641, NGC 3643, and NGC 3664. NGC 3640 forms a pair with NGC 3641, which lies 2.5 arcminutes south from NGC 3640. The group belongs to the Leo II groups, a large collection of galaxies belonging to the Virgo Supercluster scattered across 30 million light years of space west of the Virgo Cluster.

== See also ==
- NGC 2865 and NGC 5018 - two other elliptical galaxies with disturbed morphology
