= NGC 3664 =

Galaxy in the constellation Leo

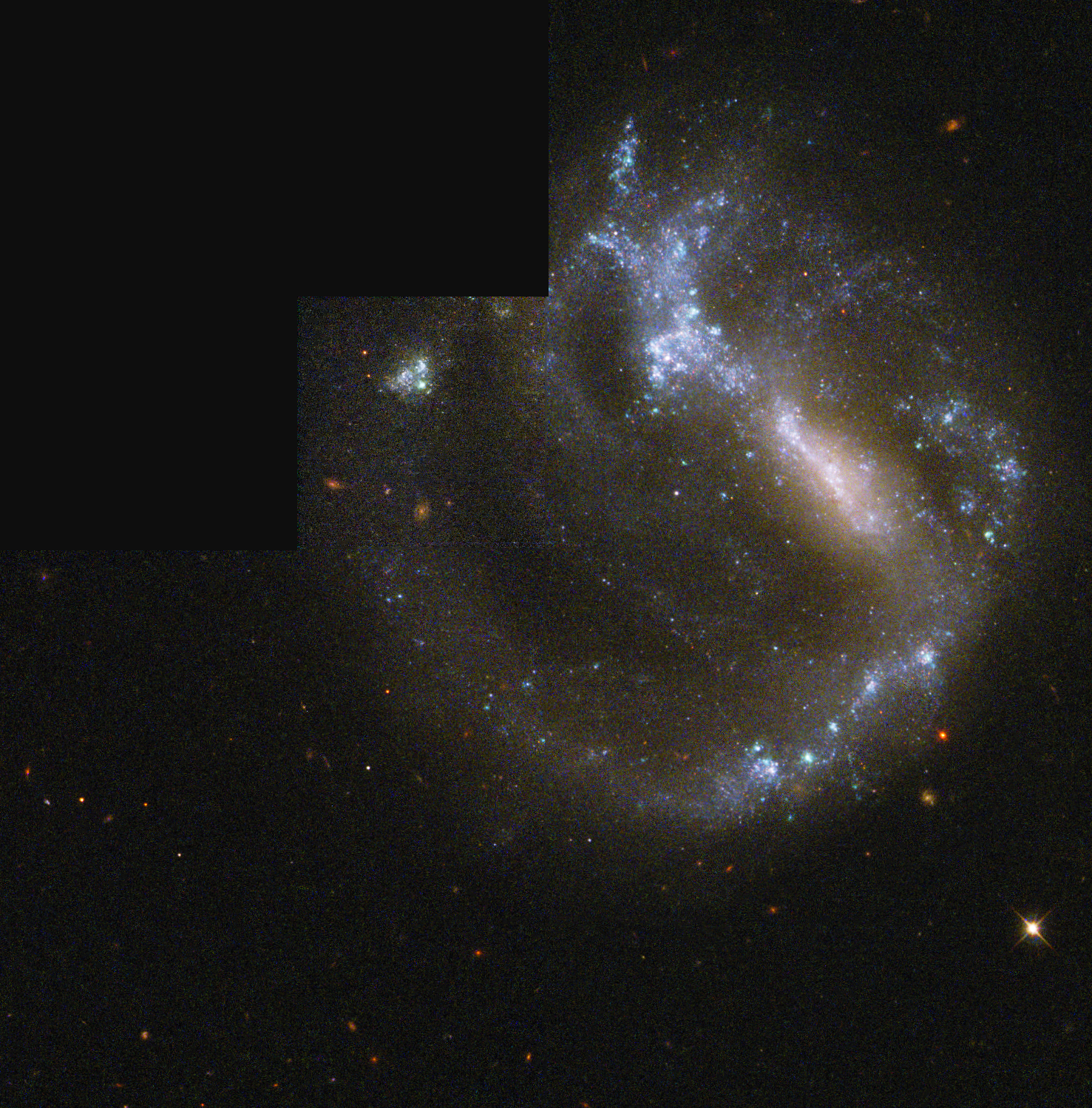
- NGC 3664 by the Hubble Space Telescope

Observation data (J2000 epoch)
- Constellation: Leo
- Right ascension: 11^{h} 24^{m} 24.2^{s}
- Declination: +03° 19′ 30″
- Redshift: 0.004607 ± 0.000007
- Heliocentric radial velocity: 1,381 ± 2 km/s
- Distance: 79 Mly (24.4 Mpc)
- Apparent magnitude (V): 12.6

Characteristics
- Type: SB(s)m pec
- Apparent size (V): 2.0′ × 1.9′
- Notable features: Interacting galaxy

Other designations
- UGC 6419, Arp 5, VV 251, DDO 95, CGCG 039-170, MCG +01-29-041, PGC 35041

NGC 3664 is a magellanic barred spiral galaxy in the constellation of Leo. It is located about 80 million light years away from Earth, which means, given its apparent dimensions, that NGC 3664 is approximately 50,000 light years across. It was discovered by Wilhelm Tempel on March 14, 1879. It is a member of the NGC 3640 Group of galaxies, which is a member of the Leo II Groups, a series of galaxies and galaxy clusters strung out from the right edge of the Virgo Supercluster.

The galaxy is characterised by its asymmetric shape, which features a single spiral arm and an off-centre bar. The distribution of HI is equally asymmetric.

== Nearby galaxies ==
NGC 3664 has a smaller satellite galaxy, known as NGC 3664A or UGC 6418, which lies 6.2 arcminutes to the south, at a projected distance of 25 to 30 kiloparsecs from NGC 3664. The HI mass of NGC 3664A is 4.5×10^{8} M_{☉}, which means that the system has similar masses as the system of the Large and Small Magellanic Cloud. A HI bridge has been detected to connect the two galaxies in images obtained by the Very Large Array. The HI also appears warped at the side of NGC 3664 opposite of NGC 3664A, indicating an ongoing interaction. The bar of NGC 3664 could have developed due to this interaction.

NGC 3664 and its satellite belong to the NGC 3640 group, named after the galaxy NGC 3640. Other members of the galaxy group include NGC 3630, NGC 3641, and NGC 3643. The group belongs to the Leo II groups, a large collection of galaxies belonging to the Virgo Supercluster scattered across 30 million light years of space west of the Virgo Cluster.

== See also ==
- NGC 4027 - a similar spiral galaxy
