= NGC 3338 =

Galaxy in the constellation Leo

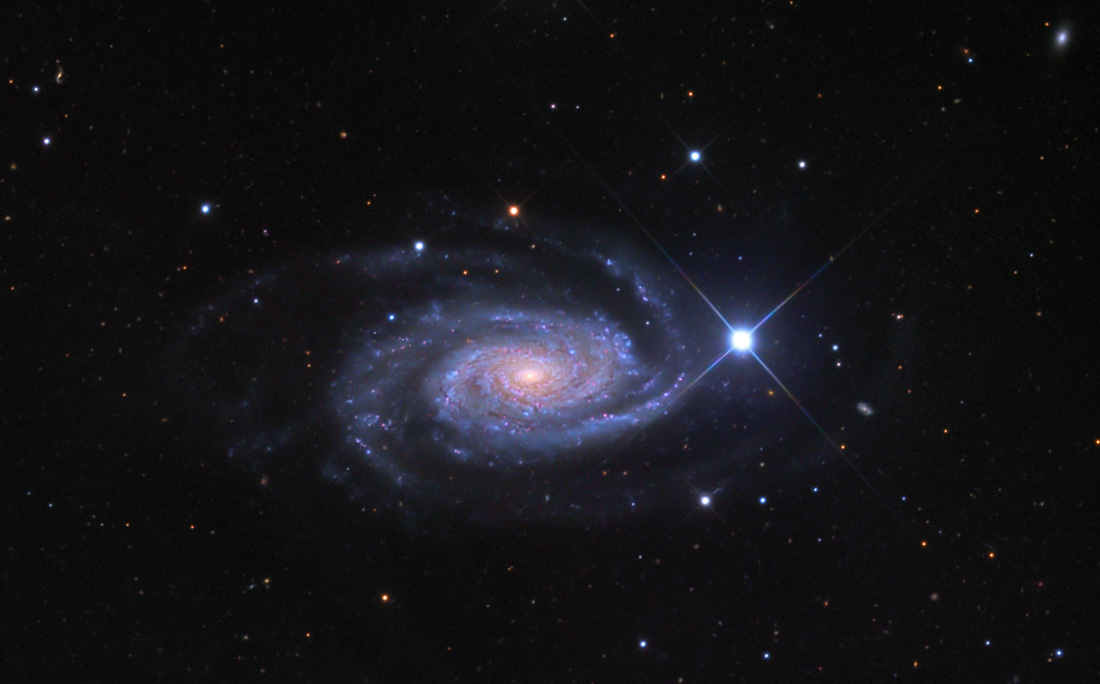
- NGC 3338 imaged by the 32-inch Schulman Telescope in Mount Lemmon Observatory

Observation data (J2000 epoch)
- Constellation: Leo
- Right ascension: 10^{h} 42^{m} 07.5197^{s}
- Declination: +13° 44′ 49.380″
- Redshift: 0.004336 ± 0.000002
- Heliocentric radial velocity: 1,300 ± 1 km/s
- Distance: 73.3 ± 14.7 Mly (22.5 ± 4.5 Mpc)
- Group or cluster: NGC 3338 Group
- Apparent magnitude (V): 10.9

Characteristics
- Type: SA(s)c
- Size: ~129,000 ly (39.4 kpc) (estimated)
- Apparent size (V): 3.38′ × 1.26′

Other designations
- IRAS 10394+1400, UGC 5826, MCG +02-27-041, PGC 31883, CGCG 065-087

NGC 3338 is a spiral galaxy in the constellation Leo. The galaxy lies about 75 million light years away from Earth, which means, given its apparent dimensions, that NGC 3338 is approximately 130,000 light years across. It was discovered by William Herschel on March 19, 1784.

NGC 3338 is categorised as a SA(s)c galaxy, meaning it is a spiral galaxy with no bar. It has a small elliptical bulge. The stellar velocity dispertion in the pseudobulge of NGC 3338 is 78 ± 2 km/s. The galaxy has two thin and well ordered spiral arms, but its overall pattern is between a grand design galaxy and multiple spiral arms as there are many spiral fragments between the arms. At their beginning the arms have different pitch angles but are symmetric and diffuse in their outer parts. The arms are bright for about half a revolution and their fainter extremities can be traced for another half revolution. There are some knots in the disk and HII regions, the largest of which more than two arcseconds across.

NGC 3338 is the foremost galaxy of the NGC 3338 Group. Other members of the group include NGC 3346, NGC 3389, UGC 5832 and Mrk 1263. At least 8 satellite galaxies have been found around NGC 3338 and five more are possible satellites. The group is part of the Leo II Groups, a large cloud of galaxies in the Virgo Supercluster.
