= UGC 5349 =

Spiral galaxy

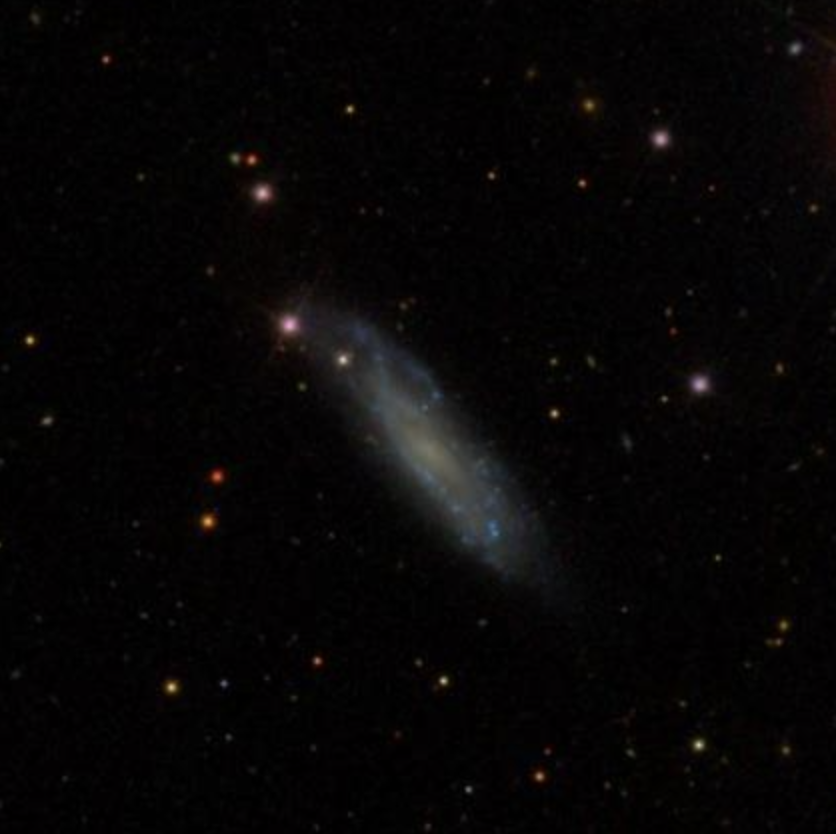
- As seen by the Sloan Digital Sky Survey

Observation data
- Constellation: Leo Minor
- Right ascension: 09^{h} 58^{m} 06^{s}
- Declination: +37° 17′ 34″
- Apparent magnitude (V): 14.2

Characteristics
- Apparent size (V): 2.7' x 0.8'

Other designations
- PGC 28795, REIZ 106, MCG 6-22-43, CGCG 182-50, KUG 955+375, Z 182-50

UGC 5349 is a barred spiral galaxy in the constellation Leo Minor. It has a large H II Region, visible from earth at magnitude 17. It is classified as a type SAB galaxy, indicating it has a weak central bar.

It is a member of the UGC 5349 Group, which is also named after it. This group contains a total of 73 galaxies.
