= NGC 3607 =

Galaxy in the constellation Leo

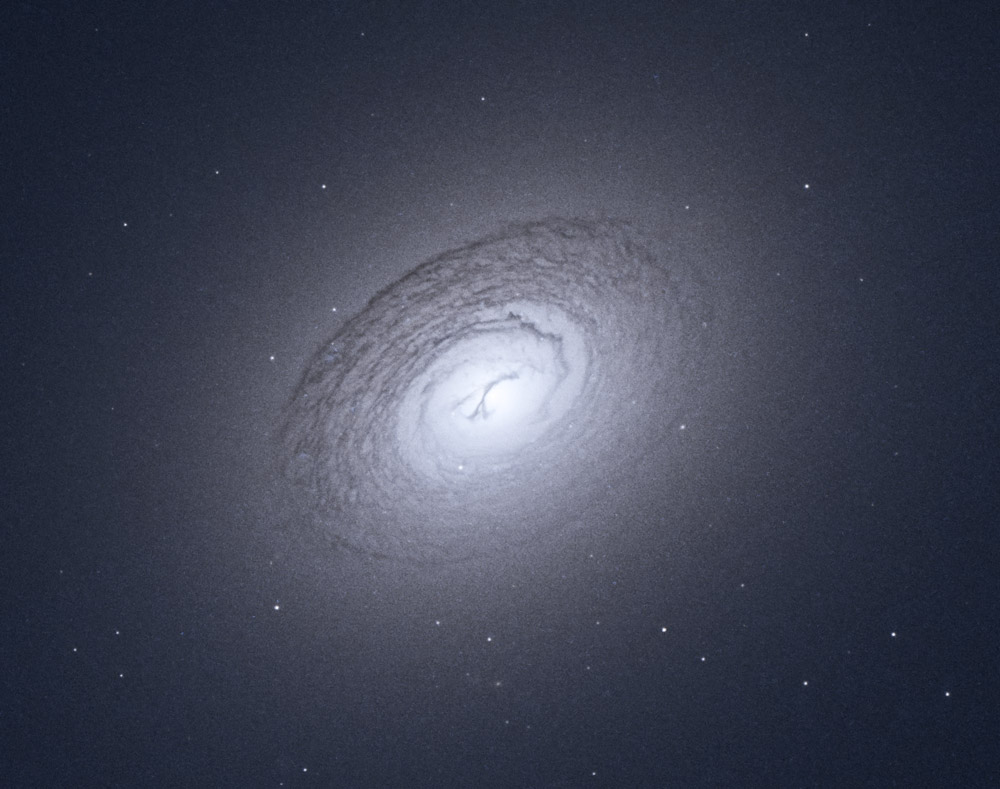
- The nuclear dust disk of NGC 3607 as imaged by the Hubble Space Telescope

Observation data (J2000 epoch)
- Constellation: Leo
- Right ascension: 11^{h} 16^{m} 54.657^{s}
- Declination: +18° 03′ 06.51″
- Heliocentric radial velocity: 930 km/s
- Distance: 73.4 Mly (22.49 Mpc)
- Group or cluster: Leo II Group
- Apparent magnitude (V): 9.9

Characteristics
- Type: SA(s)0*
- Apparent size (V): 4.6′ × 4.0′

Other designations
- 2MASX J11165465+1803065, NGC 3607, UGC 6297, PGC 34426, SDSS J111654.63+180306.3, SDSS J111654.63+180306.3

NGC 3607 is a small but fairly bright lenticular galaxy in the equatorial constellation of Leo, about 2.5° south of the prominent star Delta Leonis. The galaxy was discovered March 14, 1784 by William Herschel. Dreyer described it as "very bright, large, round, very much brighter middle, 2nd of 3". It is located at a distance of 73 million light years and is receding with a radial velocity of 930 km/s. The galaxy lies southwest of NGC 3626 at an angular separation of ~50′. It occupies the center of the Leo II Group of galaxies, forming one of its two brightest members – the other being NGC 3608. It is a member of the NGC 3607 Group of galaxies, which is a member of the Leo II Groups, a series of galaxies and galaxy clusters strung out from the right edge of the Virgo Supercluster.

The morphological class of NGC 3607 is SA(s)0*, matching a lenticular galaxy (SA0) with no inner ring structure (s). It is an intermediate mass galaxy that is being viewed at an inclination of 34°, showing an ellipticity of 0.13 with the major axis oriented along a position angle of 125°. The galaxy has an outer dusty disk with a second perpendicular disk that is falling inward toward the center of the galaxy. X-ray emission from hot gas has been detected in the interior and from all around the galaxy.

A system of 46 confirmed globular clusters have been identified around NGC 3607, which are orbiting within an effective radius of 14.2±2.0 kpc. In contrast, the stellar component of the galaxy has an effective radius of 4.2±1 kpc. Orbital motions of this cluster system imply an unusual poverty of dark matter: perhaps 16%±44% of the total mass within 5 effective radii. Its central black hole has a mass of M_{•} = (1.2±0.4)×10^{8} M_{☉} The core region of the galaxy is kinematically distinct from the remainder of the galaxy and shows an enhancement of magnesium.
