= NGC 3032 =

Galaxy in the constellation Leo

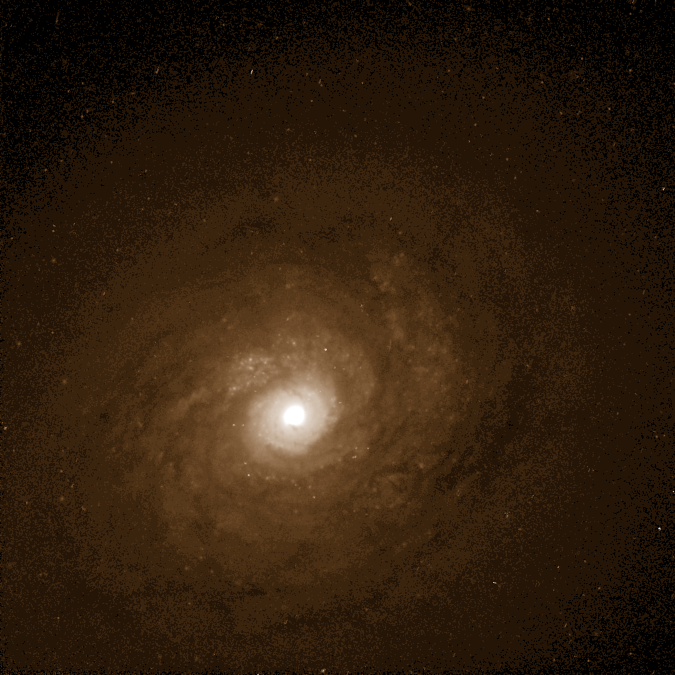
- NGC 3032 imaged by Hubble Space Telescope

Observation data
- Constellation: Leo
- Right ascension: 09^{h} 52^{m} 8,15^{s}
- Declination: +29° 14′ 10″
- Distance: 65 million LY
- Apparent magnitude (V): 12.5

Characteristics
- Apparent size (V): 1.70 x 1.3

NGC 3032 (also known as UGC 5292) is a lenticular galaxy located within the constellation Leo. It is classified as a type S0 galaxy. It was first discovered in 1827 by John Herschel.

It is thought to be a pair with NGC 3026.
