= NGC 3414 =

Galaxy in the constellation Leo Minor

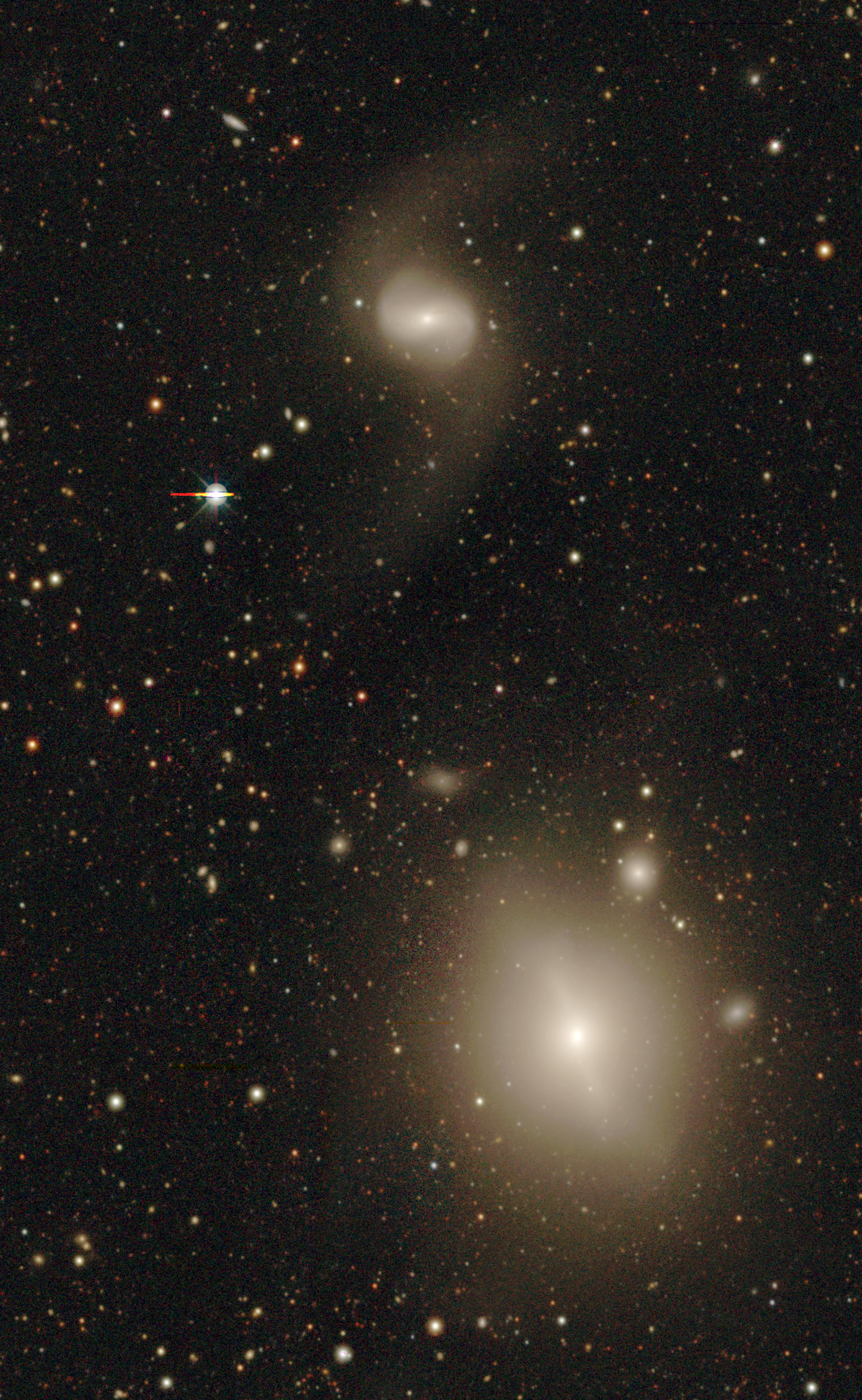
- legacy surveys image of NGC 3414 (bottom) and NGC 3418 (spiral galaxy at the top)

Observation data (J2000 epoch)
- Constellation: Leo Minor
- Right ascension: 10^{h} 51^{m} 16.242^{s}
- Declination: +27° 58′ 29.88″
- Redshift: 0.00485
- Heliocentric radial velocity: 1450 ± 55 km/s
- Distance: 77 Mly (23.5 Mpc)
- Apparent magnitude (V): 11.09
- Apparent magnitude (B): 12.06

Characteristics
- Type: S0pec
- Apparent size (V): 3.5′ × 2.6′

Other designations
- Arp 162, UGC 5959, MCG +05-26-021, PGC 32533

NGC 3414 is a lenticular galaxy in the constellation Leo Minor. It was discovered by German-British astronomer William Herschel on April 11, 1785. It is the central galaxy of a rich galaxy group. Two galaxies, NGC 3418 and UGC 5958, have similar redshifts and are within 800,000 light-years (250 kiloparsecs) of NGC 3414. It is a member of the NGC 3504 Group of galaxies, which is a member of the Leo II Groups, a series of galaxies and galaxy clusters strung out from the right edge of the Virgo Supercluster.

It has a peculiar morphology, and is listed in Halton Arp's Atlas of Peculiar Galaxies as Arp 162. The outer disc is nearly face-on, and the inner disk has a higher ellipticity and perhaps a central bar. There is a radio source that is powered by a central active galactic nucleus.

== LDC 763 Galaxy group ==
NGC 3414 is the central member of the LDC 763 galaxy group, which also includes the neighboring galaxies NGC 3418 and UGC 5958.

== See also ==
- List of NGC objects (3001-4000)
- List of NGC objects

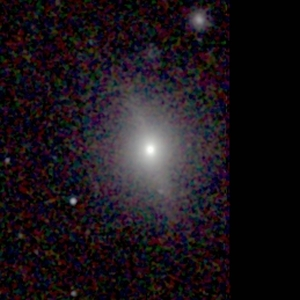
2MASS image of NGC 3414
