= NGC 3067 =

Galaxy in the constellation Leo

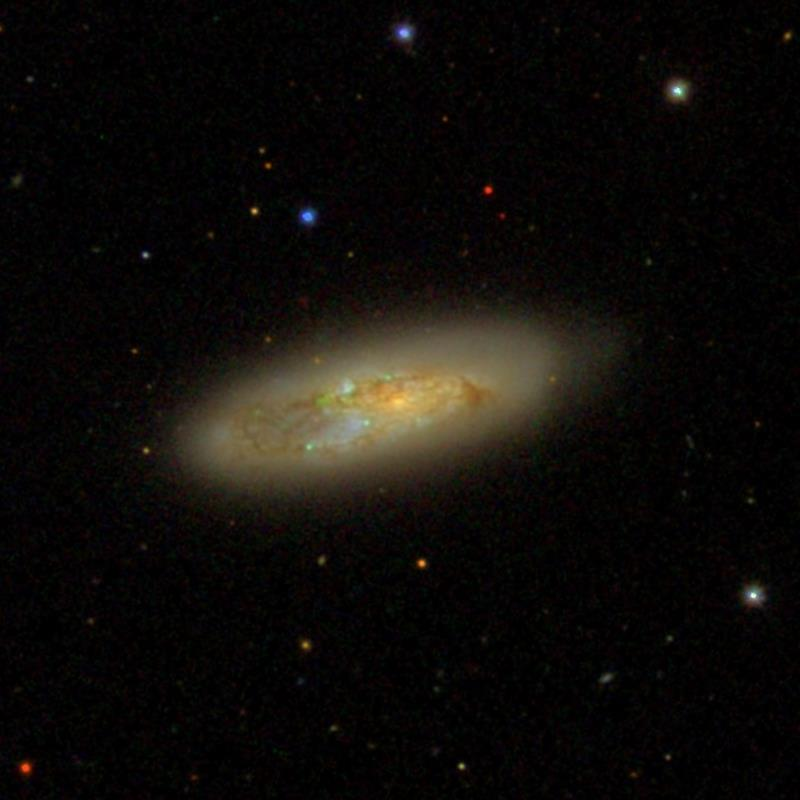
- NGC 3067

Observation data (J2000.0 epoch)
- Constellation: Leo
- Right ascension: 09^{h} 58^{m}
- Declination: +32° 22′

NGC 3067 is an intermediate spiral galaxy in the constellation of Leo.
