= NGC 3608 =

Galaxy in Leo

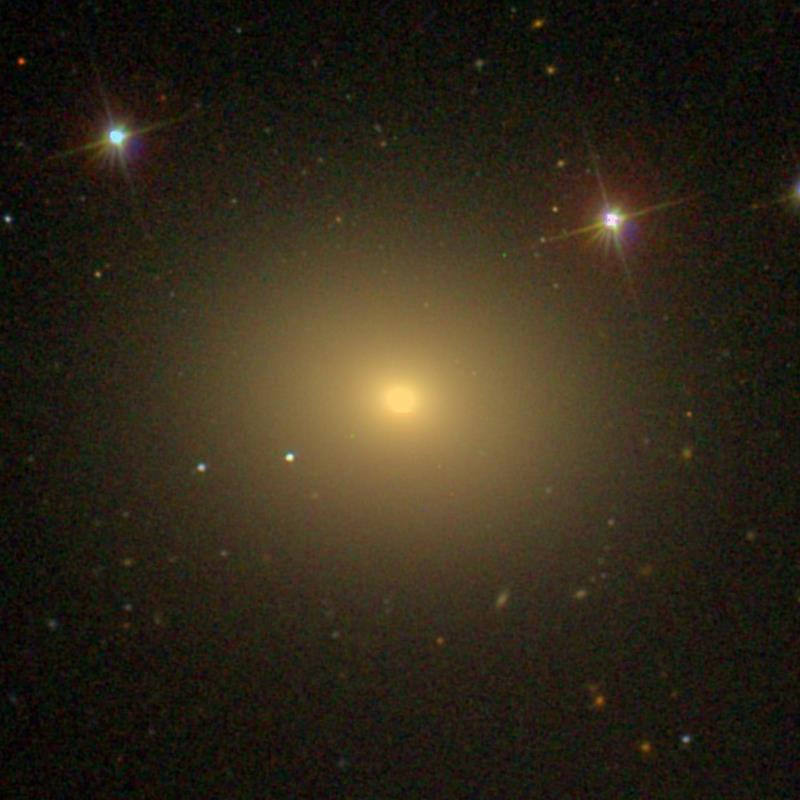
- SDSS image of NGC 3608

Observation data (J2000 epoch)
- Constellation: Leo
- Right ascension: 11^{h} 16^{m} 58.967^{s}
- Declination: +18° 08′ 54.71″
- Redshift: 0.003959
- Heliocentric radial velocity: 1,185±46 km/s
- Distance: 73 Mly (22.3 Mpc)
- Group or cluster: Leo II group
- Apparent magnitude (V): 10.76
- Apparent magnitude (B): 11.7
- Absolute magnitude (V): −20.98

Characteristics
- Type: E1-2
- Apparent size (V): 3.2′ × 2.6′

Other designations
- UGC 6299, MCG +03-29-022, PGC 34433

NGC 3608 is an elliptical galaxy located in the constellation Leo. It was discovered by William Herschel on March 14, 1784.

NGC 3608 is part of the Leo II Group of galaxies, including NGC 3605 and NGC 3607. It is approximately 13.0 billion years old. There is diffuse X-ray emission coming from this galaxy and NGC 3607, which suggests that the two may be merging.

NGC 3608 has a significant population of globular clusters. The population distribution is bimodal, with "red" and "blue" populations; the blue globular clusters form a majority. The blue globular clusters have a more extended distribution throughout the galaxy. Overall, the globular clusters are aligned along an axis that is not the same as the rest of the stars, which may be further evidence of galaxy interaction with NGC 3607.

A large structure of neutral hydrogen gas known as an H I region, about 130,000 light-years (40 kpc) across, exists some twelve arcminutes (corresponding to about 230,000 light-years, or 70 kpc) away from NGC 3608. It may be associated with the galaxy.
