= NGC 5018 =

Elliptical galaxy in the constellation Virgo

- NGC 5018 taken by ESO's Very Large Telescope.

Observation data (J2000 epoch)
- Constellation: Virgo
- Right ascension: 13^{h} 13^{m} 01.000^{s}
- Declination: −19° 31′ 05.87″
- Redshift: 0.009413
- Heliocentric radial velocity: 2809km/s
- Distance: 132.51 Mly
- Apparent magnitude (B): 11.71

Characteristics
- Type: S...

Other designations
- 6dFGS gJ131301.0-193106, ESO 576-10, ESO-LV 576-0100, GSC 06116-01096, IRAS 13103-1915, IRAS F13103-1915, ISOSS J13130-1931, LEDA 45908, 2MASX J13130099-1931058, MCG-03-34-017, PSCz Q13103-1915, SGC 131020-1915.3, UGCA 335, [CHM2007] HDC 772 J131300.99-1931058, [CHM2007] LDC 955 J131300.99-1931058, [FWB89] Galaxy 337, [M98c] 131020.0-191518, [SLK2004] 800

NGC 5018 is an elliptical galaxy located in the constellation of Virgo at an approximate distance of 132.51 Mly. NGC 5018 was discovered in 1788 by William Herschel.

== Supernovae ==
Three supernovae have been observed in NGC 5018:

- SN 2002dj (Type Ia, mag. 17) was discovered by LOTOSS (Lick Observatory and Tenagra Observatory Supernova Searches) on 12 June 2002.
- SN 2017isq (Type Ia, mag. 15.345) was discovered by ATLAS on 4 December 2017.
- SN 2021fxy (Type Ia, mag. 16.9) was discovered by Kōichi Itagaki on 17 March 2021.

== See also ==
- Galaxy
