= NGC 2844 =

Spiral galaxy

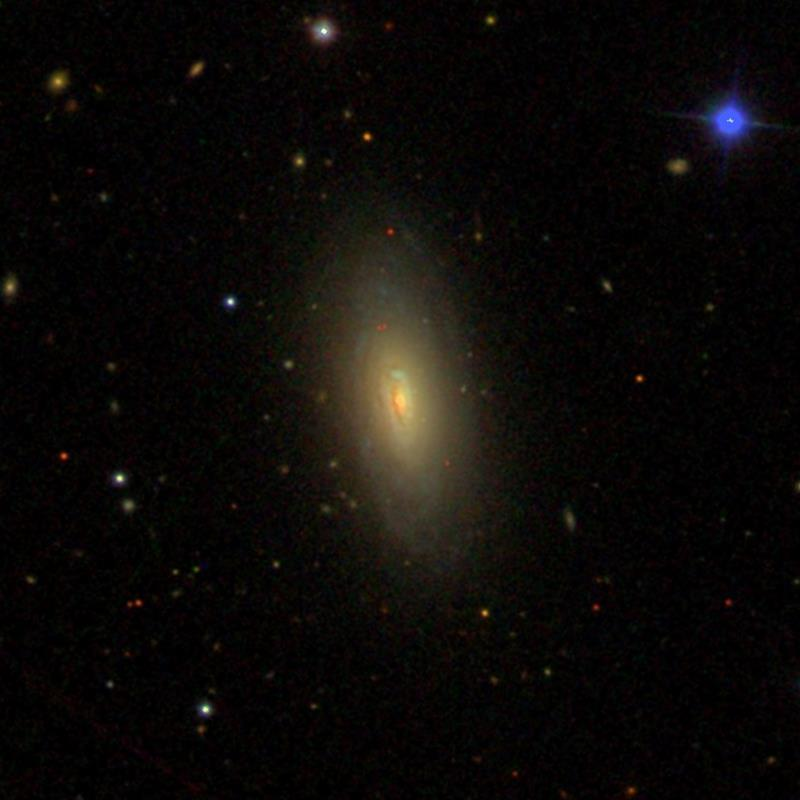

Observation data
- Constellation: Lynx
- Right ascension: 09^{h} 23^{m} 25^{s}
- Declination: +40° 02′ 24″
- Distance: 66,000,000 LY
- Apparent magnitude (V): 13.6

Characteristics
- Type: Unbarred spiral galaxy
- Apparent size (V): 1.77' x 0.82'

Other designations
- IRAS F09186+4021, LEDA 26501, PGC 26501, UGC 4971

NGC 2844 is an unbarred spiral galaxy in Lynx. It is classified as a type SAa galaxy. It is visually similar to the galaxy Messier 64.

The galaxy was discovered on March 18, 1787, by William Herschel. He described it as "considerably faint, considerably small".
