= NGC 3026 =

Spiral galaxy in the constellation Leo

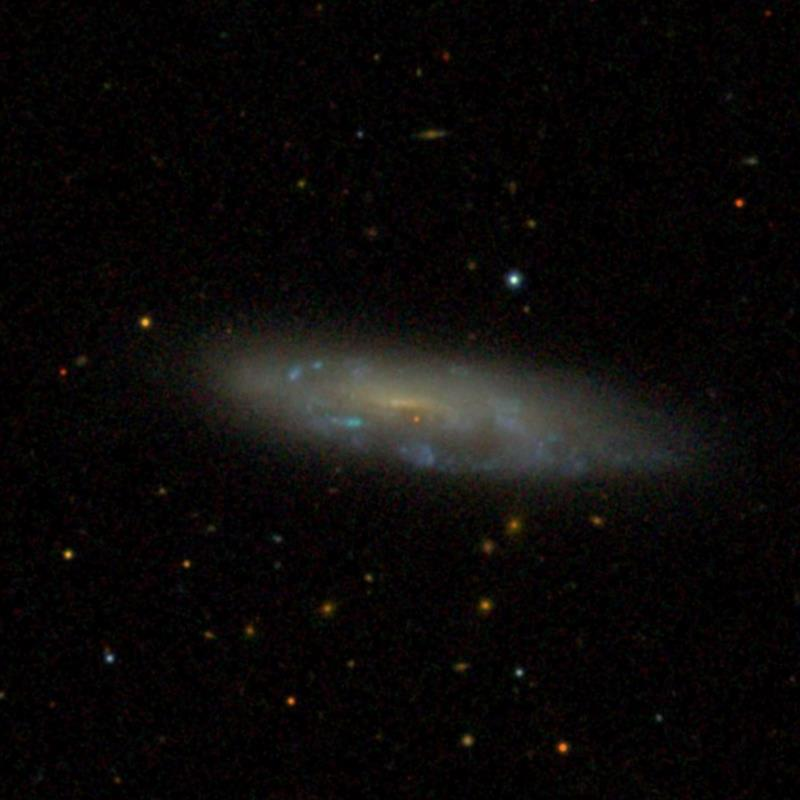

Observation data
- Constellation: Leo
- Right ascension: 09^{h} 52^{m} 24^{s}
- Declination: +28° 25′ 45″
- Distance: 25,940,000 LY
- Apparent magnitude (V): 13.8

Characteristics
- Apparent size (V): 2.22' x 0.6'

Other designations
- PGC 28351, UGC 5279

NGC 3026 is a barred spiral galaxy in the constellation Leo. It is classified as a type SBm galaxy. It was discovered by Lewis Swift on the 22nd of May, 1886. It was discovered while attempting to locate Winnecke's Comet.

It is thought to be in a pair with NGC 3032.
