= UGC 5832 =

Barred spiral galaxy

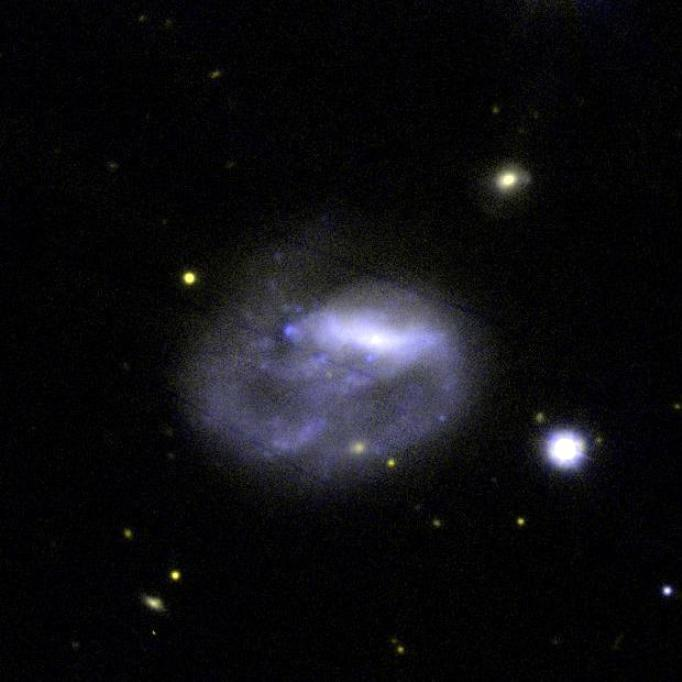
- UGC 5832 in the center. CGCG 065-090 is to the upper right of the UGC 5832

Observation data
- Constellation: Leo
- Right ascension: 10^{h} 42^{m} 48^{s}
- Declination: +13° 27′ 36″
- Distance: 70,000,000 LY
- Apparent magnitude (V): 13.3

Characteristics
- Apparent size (V): 1.51' x 0.75'

Other designations
- Arp 291, IRAS 10401+1343, PGC 31930, PGC 31933, VV 112, Z 65-89

UGC 5832 is an barred spiral galaxy in Leo. It is considered a galaxy of interest because it is lopsided, containing only one arm. This resulted in it being classified by Halton Arp, creator of the Arp catalog, as a galaxy undergoing 'wind effects', meaning it is undergoing interaction with another galaxy. The galaxy it is interacting with is a small dwarf galaxy, CGCG 065-090.

It has 29 known regions of star formation. Lopsided galaxies usually have low star formation, however UGC 5832 was found to have star formation levels comparable to that of an average spiral of elliptical galaxy.

It is a member of the NGC 3338 Group.
