= NGC 3691 =

Barred spiral galaxy

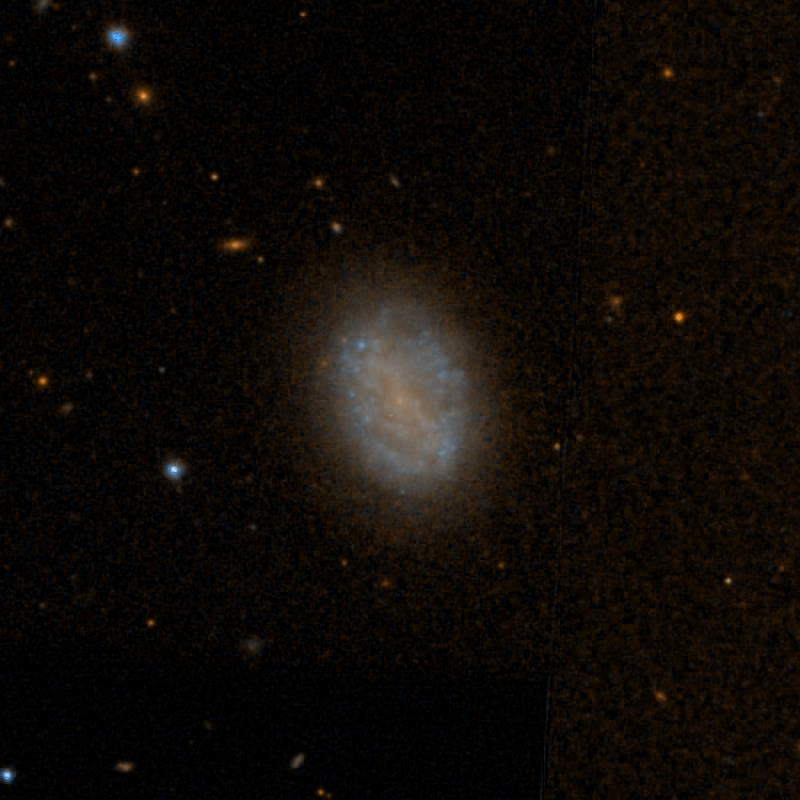
- NGC 3691 (SDSS DR14)

Observation data
- Constellation: Leo
- Right ascension: 11^{h} 29^{m} 30^{s}
- Declination: +16° 46′ 37″

NGC 3691 is a barred spiral galaxy located in the constellation Leo. It was discovered on March 14, 1784 by the astronomer William Herschel.
