= Leo Cloud =

Series of galaxy clusters

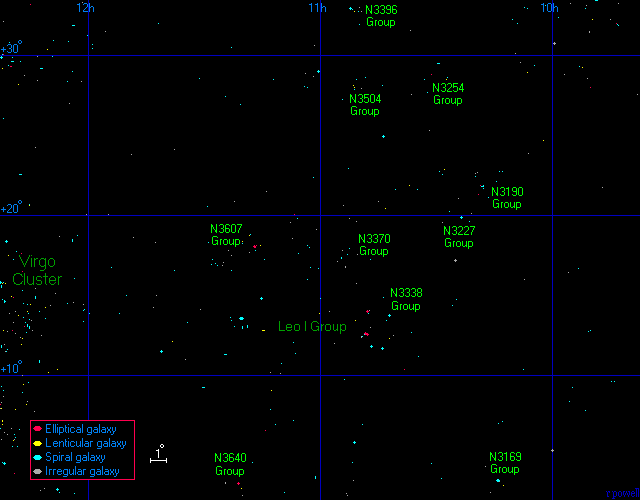
- The Leo II Groups of galaxies

Observation data (Epoch )
- Parent structure: Virgo Supercluster
- Major axis: Leo Cloud: 15.4 Mpc (50 Mly); Leo II A Filament : 16.0 Mpc (52 Mly); Leo II B Filament : 15.5 Mpc (51 Mly)
- Minor axis: 7.9 Mpc (26 Mly)
- Redshift: 1,200 km/s
- Distance: Leo Cloud: 26.35 Mpc (86 Mly) (Distance based on the average of the distances of the Leo II A and B Filaments); Leo II A Filament : 26.30 Mpc (86 Mly); Leo II B Filament : 26.40 Mpc (86 Mly)

Other designations
- Leo II Cloud Complex, Leo II Cloud, Leo Cloud, Leo II Groups

The Leo II Groups, Leo II Cloud, or simply the Leo Cloud is a galaxy filament consisting of at least 18 galaxy groups. It is located approximately 86 Mly (26 Mpc) from the Solar System. The Leo Cloud in supergalactic SGY coordinates is physically behind the Virgo Cluster. Eventually, over the next Hubble time, the galaxy groups that make up the Leo II Cloud will infall and merge with the Virgo Cluster.

The Leo Cloud, along with the Crater Cloud which contains the NGC 4038 Group, is actually part of the same branch of a larger galaxy filament that extends from the Centaurus Cluster through the Virgo Cluster and continues through the Ursa Major Cluster, known as the Virgo Strand. The Virgo Strand is the main component of the Virgo Supercluster and is made of two branches with the lower branch consisting of the Leo and Crater clouds, while the upper branch is known as the Virgo Southern Extension or Virgo II Groups.

The Leo Cloud itself is actually composed of two filaments, the Leo II A and Leo II B filaments. The Leo II A filament consists of the majority of the cloud, while the Leo II B filament consists of a sparse region of the cloud.

The Leo Cloud, like the Virgo III Cloud, is prolate and points toward the Virgo Cluster.

== List of groups ==
Below is a list of groups in the Leo Cloud according to astronomer Brent Tully.

Column 1: The name of the group in Tully's NBGG
Column 2: The right ascension for epoch 2000.
Column 3: The declination for epoch 2000.
Column 4: Number of members of the group.
Column 5: Brightest member of the group
Column 6: Redshift of the group.
Column 7: Distance of the group (Millions of light-years).
Column 8: Cross-Identifications with other catalogs.

(Sources for data columns:)

Groups within the Leo Cloud
Name of group	R.A. (J2000)	Dec. (J2000)	Number of members	Brightest member	Redshift	Distance (Mly)	Cross-ID
NBGC 21-1	11h 24m 25.6s	17d 22m 44s	11 (Tully); 11 (Fourque); 8 (Garcia); 10/16/16 (Giuricin)	NGC 3607	0.004000	68	NGC 3607 Group, Leo II Group, GHCG 77, TG 36, DV 49, [FWB89] GrG 48, [N93] 65, [N93] 66, NGC 3626 Group, NGC 3507 Group, LGG 228, NGC 3686 Group, LGG 237, NOGG H 527, NOGG P1 532, NOGG P2 542
NBGC 21-2	11h 02m 47.3s	17d 59m 22s	3 (Tully)	NGC 3501	0.003769	66	
NBGC 21-3	10h 50m 45.0s	17d 20m 49s	10 (Tully); 6 (Fourque); 5 (Garcia); 10/13/13 (Giuricin)	NGC 3370	0.004273	72	NGC 3370 Group, LGG 219, NGC 3507 Group, NOGG H 497, P1 512, P2 522
NBGC 21-4	11h 39m 35.688s	11d 47m 29.33s	2 (Tully); 2 (Giuricin)	NGC 3810	0.003309	60	NGC 3810 Group, NOGG P1 561, NOGG NOGG P2 570
NBGC 21-5	10h 44m 0.8.6s	13d 40m 30s	3 (Tully); 3 (Fourque); 4 (Garcia); 4 (Giuricin)	NGC 3338	0.004286	73	NGC 3338 Group, LGG 219, NOGG H 480, NOGG P1 498, NOGG P2 501
NBGC 21-6	10h 21m 35.2s	21d 07m 41s	12 (Tully); 5/8 (Fourque); 13 (Garcia); 8/7/7 (Giuricin)	NGC 3190	0.004670	77	NGC 3190 Group, NGC 3227 Group, LGG 194, NOGG H 454, NOGG P1 469, NOGG P2 476
NBGC 21-7	11h 03m 36.558s	28d 00m 22.56s	2 (Tully); 6 (Garcia); 2 (Giuricin)	NGC 3504	0.005074	82	NGC 3504 Group, LGG 227, NOGG P1 519, NOGG P2 529
NBGC 21-8	10h 28m 55.4s	28d 47m 52s	4 (Tully); 4 (Fourque); 5 (Garcia); 5 (Giuricin)	NGC 3254	0.004610	75	NGC 3254 Group, LGG 197, NOGG H 465, NOGG P1 479, NOGG P2 486
NBGC 21-9	10h 51m 46.7s	32d 51m 31s	4 (Tully); 5 (Fourque); 6 (Garcia); 4 (Giuricin)	NGC 3430	0.005000	80	NGC 3396 Group, LGG 218, NGC 3430 Group, NOGG H 490, NOGG P1 500, NOGG P2 510
NBGC 21-10	10h 13m 57.0s	03d 23m 20s	5 (Tully); 3 (Fourque); 5 (Garcia); 4 (Giuricin)	NGC 3169	0.003599	64	NGC 3166 Group, NGC 3169 Group, LGG 192, NOGG H 446, NOGG P1 463, NOGG P2 470
NBGC 21-11	11h 20m 41.4s	03d 15m 19s	5 (Tully); 5 (Fourque); 6 (Garcia); 3 (Giuricin)	NGC 3640	0.004203	72	NGC 3640 Group, LGG 233, NOGG H 522, NOGG P1 536, NOGG P2 546
NBGC 21-12	09h 49m 43.946s	32d 53m 48.99s	10 (Tully); 3 (Fourque); 4 (Giuricin)	NGC 3003	0.004937	78	NGC 2964 Group, NGC 3003 Group, NOGG H 420, NOGG P1 433, NOGG P2 442
NBGC 21-13	09h 50m 54.242s	28d 32m 57.12s	2 (Tully); 2 (Giuricin)	NGC 3026	0.004923	79	NGC 3026 Group, NOGG H 426, NOGG P1 440, NOGG P2 448
NBGC 21-14	09h 59m 53.783s	37d 16m 13.72s	2 (Tully); 2 (Giuricin)	UGC 5349	0.004590	73	UGC 5349 Group, NOGG P1 452, NOGG P2 459
NBGC 21-15	09h 24m 18.857s	34h 30m 45.59s	2 (Tully); 3 (Giuricin)	NGC 2859	0.005631	86	NGC 2859 Group, NOGG H 391, NOGG P1 403, NOGG P2 412
NBGC 21-16	09h 17m 27.179s	41h 59m 50.20s	2 (Tully); 2/3/3 (Giuricin)	NGC 2798	0.005801	87	NGC 2798 Group, NOGG H 385, NOGG P1 395, NOGG P2 405
NBGC 21-17	09h 23m 14.210s	40h 09m 52.75s	3 (Tully); 2/3/2 (Giuricin)	NGC 2844	0.004937	79	NGC 2852 Group, NOGG H 389, NOGG P1 401, NOGG P2 410
NBGC 21-18	09h 12m 35.3s	34h 59m 06s	5 (Tully); 3 (Garcia); 4/4/3 (Giuricin)	NGC 2770	0.007000	104	RSCG 30, NGC 2778 Group, LGG 171, NGC 2770 Group, NOGG H 381, NOGG P1 391, NOGG P2 401

== See also ==
- M96 Group
- Virgo II Groups
- Virgo III Groups
