= UGC 6697 =

Galaxy in the constellation Leo

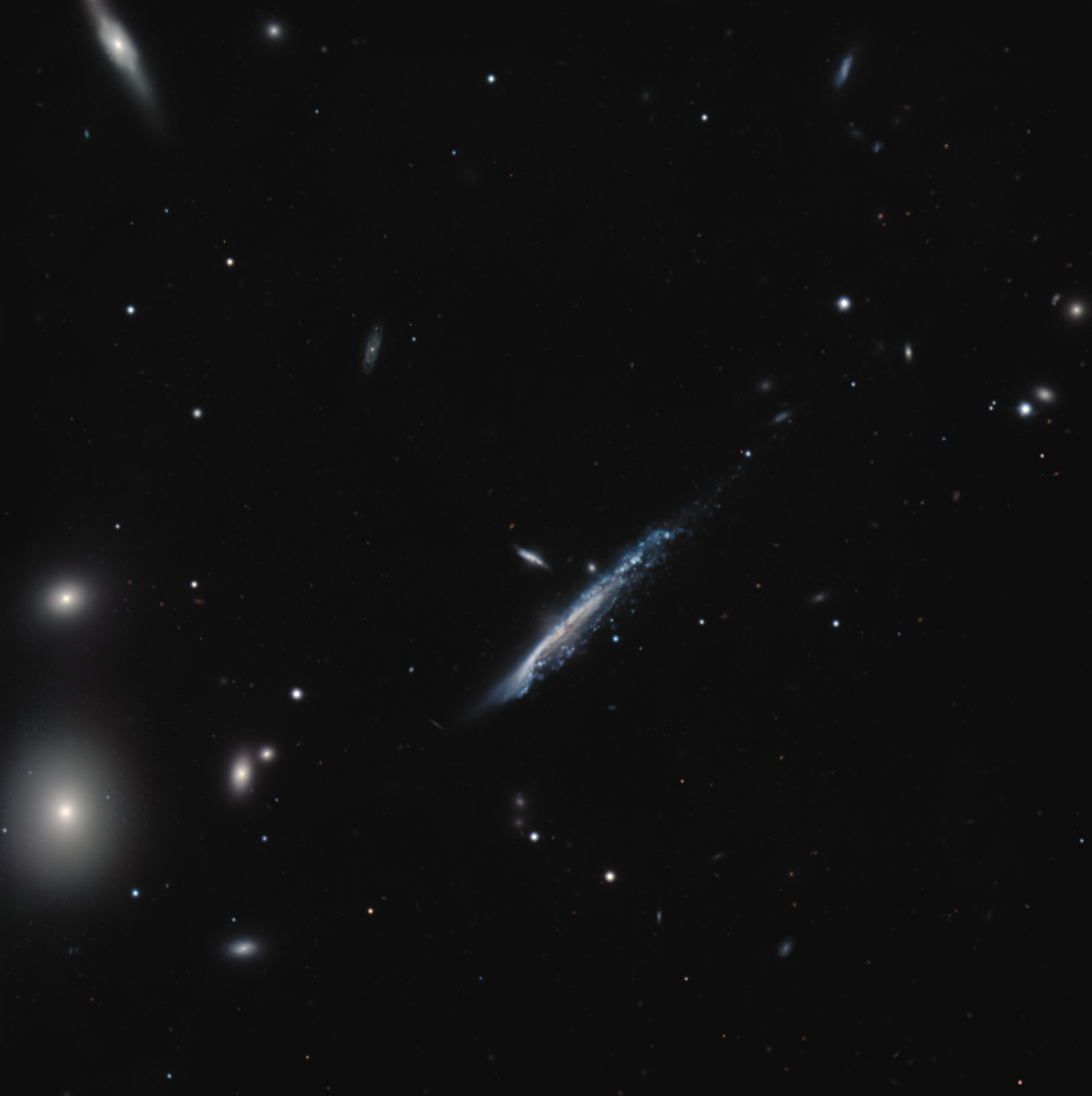
- Hubble Space Telescope Image of UGC 6697

Observation data (J2000 epoch)
- Constellation: Leo
- Right ascension: 11h 43m 49.07s
- Declination: +19d 58m 06.40s
- Redshift: 0.022432
- Heliocentric radial velocity: 6,717 km/s
- Distance: 378 Mly (115.8 Mpc)
- Group or cluster: Leo Cluster
- Apparent magnitude (V): 13.59

Characteristics
- Type: Im, HII, Sbrst
- Size: 205,000 y
- Apparent size (V): 1.9' x 0.3'

Other designations
- PGC 36466, CGCG 097-087, MCG +03-30-066, 2MFGC 09207, WBL 353-022, SDSS J114349.07+195806.4, IRAS F11412+2014, 2CXO J114349.1-195807, 2XMM J114349.2+195804, ABELL 1367:[BFG83] 08, 2MASX J11434911+1958063, ECO 02995, NSA 140139, UITBOC 1673, LEDA 36466

UGC 6697 is a large irregular spiral galaxy with a bar located in the constellation Leo. It is located 378 million light-years from the Solar System and has an estimated diameter of 205,000 light-years. UGC 6697 is considered a starburst galaxy which produces high rates of star formation. The first known reference to this galaxy comes from volume II of the Catalogue of Galaxies and of Clusters of Galaxies compiled by Fritz Zwicky in 1968, where it was listed as CGCG 097-087, and its coordinates listed as 1141.2 + 2015 (epoch B1950).

== Possible Jellyfish Galaxy ==
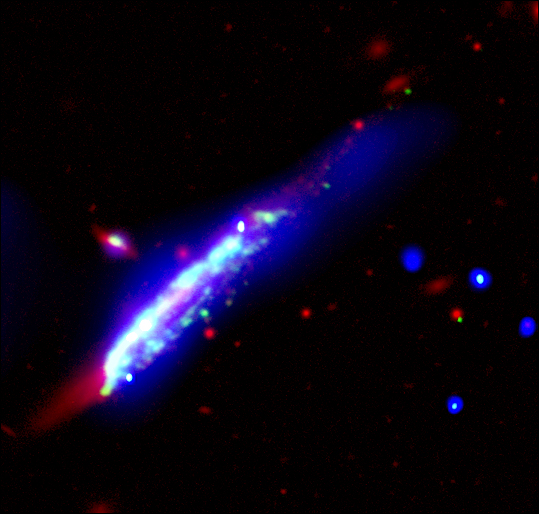
Chandra X-ray Observatory of UGC 6697

UGC 6697 has a particular morphology. It is considered an edge-on galaxy and such has a long tidal tail with blue color and low surface brightness which stretches out northwest. This is in fact caused by dynamic pressure. It occurs when the galaxy plunges forward into the cluster, the pressure acts on the galaxy and penetrates through high speeds causing intracluster medium. In the process, the cooler gas is compressed and expelled from the galaxy's edge thus forming a trail. The gas trail extends 100 kpc which measures 326,000 light-years in diameter. In the long run, the dynamic pressure will eventually strip the gas from the galaxy, rending it an anemic galaxy.

According to observations from Chandra X-ray Observatory, it shows that more massive new stars have formed in compressed gas regions of UGC 6697 due to the result of increased dynamic stripping. These, however will explode into supernovas over the next 10 million years which its heat produces x-rays and optical light.

== Companion galaxy ==
UGC 6697 has one companion galaxy: CGCG 097-087N (also known as 2MASX J11434983+1958343). It is located 379 million light-years away and also shows signs of distortion caused by dynamic pressure. Further studies show that the two galaxies might have interacted in the past.

== Supernova ==
One supernova has been observed in UGC 6697. SN 1986C (Type II, mag. 18) was discovered by B. Leibundgut and B. Binggeli of European Southern Observatory, La Silla on March 5, 1986.

== Group membership ==
UGC 6697 is a member of the Leo Cluster which is made up of at least 70 galaxies. The other members include NGC 3805, NGC 3837, the brightest cluster member NGC 3842, NGC 3860, NGC 3883, NGC 3884, NGC 3919, NGC 3929, NGC 3937, NGC 3940, NGC 3947 and NGC 3954. Other galaxies included in the Leo Cluster are radio galaxy NGC 3862, and IC 2955.
