= NGC 3954 =

Elliptical galaxy in the constellation of Leo

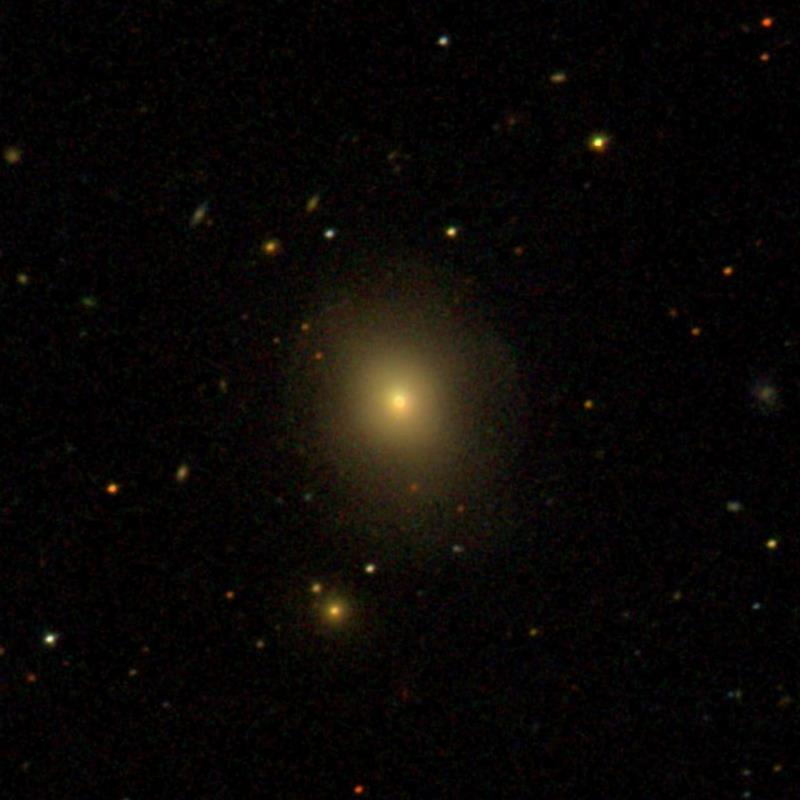
- SDSS image of NGC 3954

Observation data (J2000 epoch)
- Constellation: Leo
- Right ascension: 11^{h} 53^{m} 41.66824^{s}
- Declination: +20° 52′ 56.9871″
- Redshift: 0.023196
- Heliocentric radial velocity: 6954 km/s
- Distance: 324 Mly (99.2 Mpc)
- Group or cluster: NGC 3937 Group
- Apparent magnitude (V): 14.65
- Absolute magnitude (B): -22.84

Characteristics
- Type: E?
- Size: ~141,600 ly (43.41 kpc) (estimated)
- Apparent size (V): 0.6′ × 0.6′

Other designations
- UGC 6866, MCG +04-28-091, PGC 37291

NGC 3954 is an elliptical galaxy located 324 million light-years away in the constellation Leo. It was discovered on April 26, 1785, by the astronomer William Herschel. NGC 3954 is a LINER galaxy, and is a member of the NGC 3937 Group.

NGC 3954 has a supermassive black hole with an estimated mass of 4.8 × 10^{8} M_{☉}.

== NGC 3842 Group ==
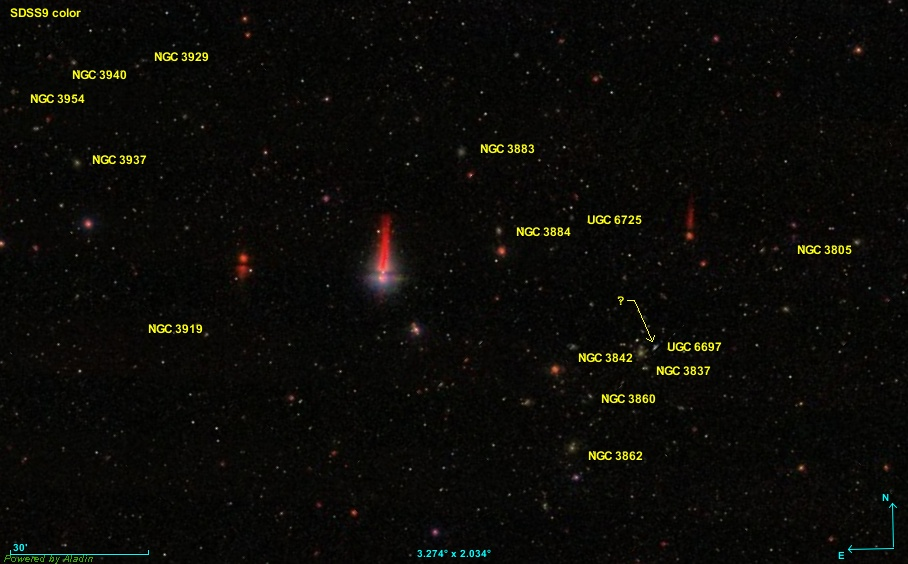
Image of NGC 3842 Group

NGC 3947 is part of the NGC 3842 group, the brightest galaxy in this group. The NGC 3842 group contains at least 16 galaxies. The other galaxies in the group are NGC 3805, NGC 3837, NGC 3842, NGC 3860, NGC 3862, NGC 3883, NGC 3884, NGC 3919, NGC 3929, NGC 3937, NGC 3940, NGC 3947, UGC 6697 and UGC 6725, respectively designated 1141+2015 and 1142+2044 for the galaxies CGCG 1141.2+2015 and CGCG 1142.5+2044. The 16th galaxy in the list published by Abraham Mahtessian in 1998 is designated 1134+2015, an unfortunate abbreviated notation that makes galaxy identification difficult and sometimes even impossible, as this one is not included in the NASA/IPAC and Simbad databases. It is possible that 1134+2015 is the galaxy SDSS J114348.22+195830.7, which is north of and very close to UGC 6697. The Hubble distance to this dwarf galaxy is indeed 105.0 ± 7.4 Mpc (~342 million light-years ), and it therefore likely belongs to the NGC 3862 group.

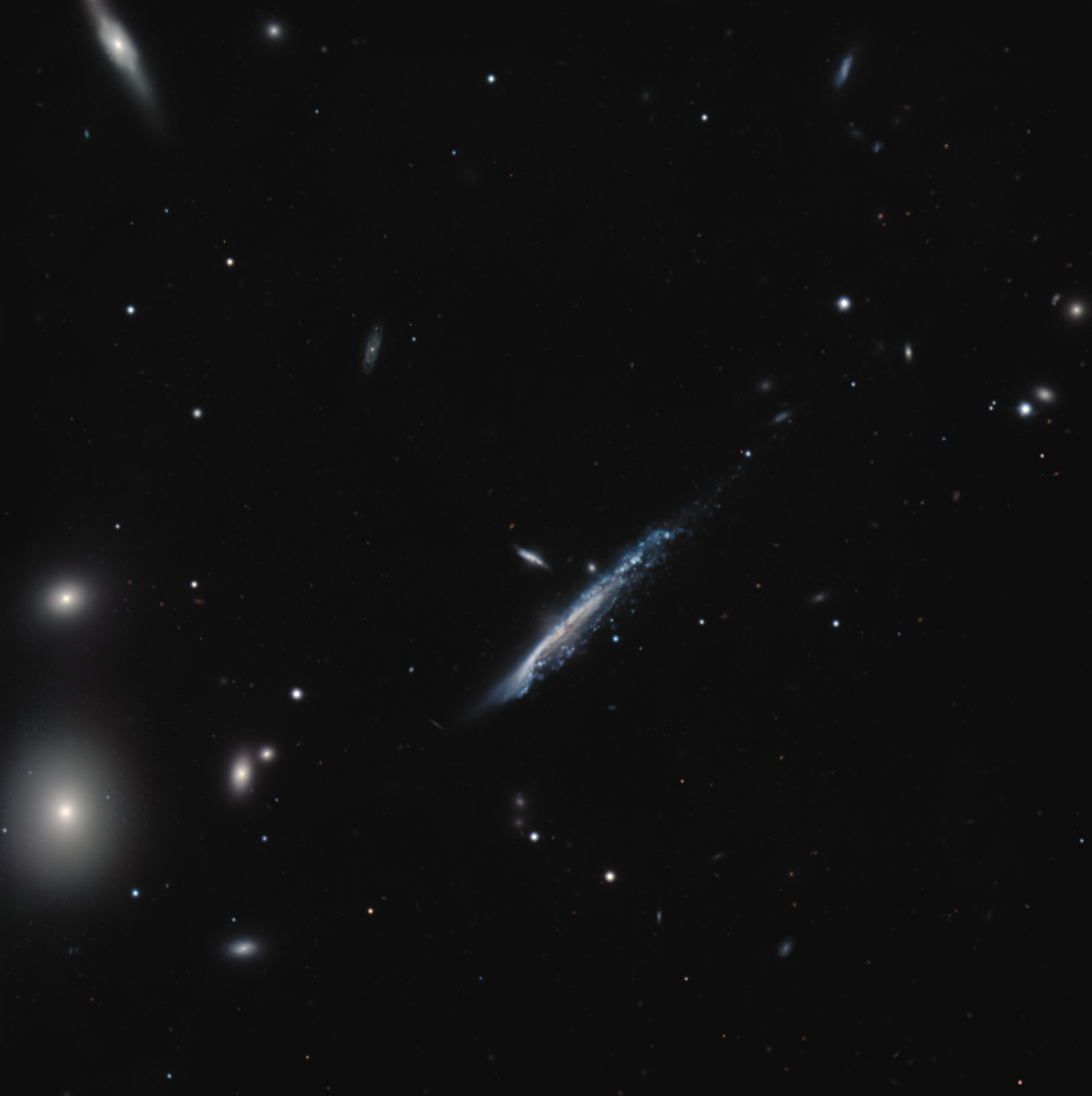
Dwarf galaxy 2MASX J11434983+1958343 north of UGC 6697 is probably part of the NGC 3842 group

The galaxy north of NGC 3862 is IC 2955. The Hubble distances to these two galaxies are 100.3 ± 7.0 Mpc (~327 million light-years) and 100.8 ± 7.1 Mpc (~329 million light-years) respectively. These two galaxies probably form a pair. IC 2955 is therefore part of the NGC 3842 group.

=== Leo cluster ===
Like several of the neighboring galaxies, NGC 3947 and the galaxies of the NGC 3842 group are part of the Leo Cluster.

== See also ==
- NGC 3937
