= NGC 3873 =

Galaxy in the constellation Leo

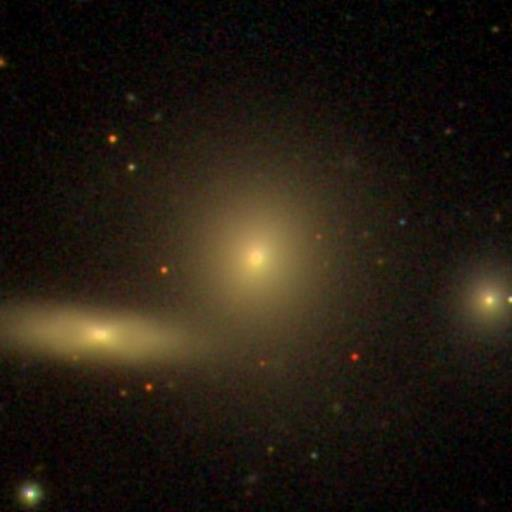
- SDSS image of NGC 3873 (center), and NGC 3875 (lower left).

Observation data (J2000 epoch)
- Constellation: Leo
- Right ascension: 11^{h} 45^{m} 46.1^{s}
- Declination: 19° 46′ 26″
- Redshift: 0.018126
- Heliocentric radial velocity: 5434 km/s
- Distance: 302 Mly (92.7 Mpc)
- Group or cluster: Leo Cluster
- Apparent magnitude (V): 13.85

Characteristics
- Type: E
- Size: ~130,000 ly (40 kpc) (estimated)
- Apparent size (V): 1.5 x 1.3

Other designations
- CGCG 97-137, KCPG 300A, MCG 3-30-106, PGC 36670, UGC 6735

NGC 3873 is an elliptical galaxy located about 300 million light-years away in the constellation Leo. The galaxy was discovered by astronomer Heinrich d'Arrest on May 8, 1864. NGC 3873 is a member of the Leo Cluster.

== Supernova ==
One supernova has been observed in NGC 3873:

- SN 2007ci (Type Ia, mag. 17.5) was discovered by Tim Puckett and T. Crowley on 15 May 2007.

== See also ==
- NGC 3842
