= NGC 3875 =

Galaxy in the constellation Leo

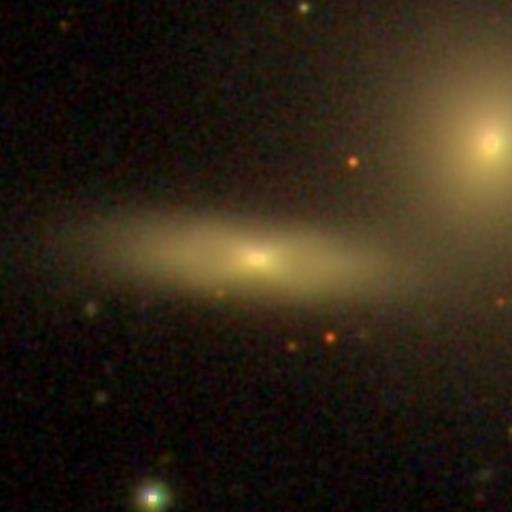
- SDSS image of NGC 3875 (center), and NGC 3873 (upper right).

Observation data (J2000 epoch)
- Constellation: Leo
- Right ascension: 11^{h} 45^{m} 49.4^{s}
- Declination: 19° 46′ 03″
- Redshift: 0.023209
- Heliocentric radial velocity: 6958 km/s
- Distance: 324 Mly (99.3 Mpc)
- Group or cluster: Leo Cluster
- Apparent magnitude (V): 14.9

Characteristics
- Type: S0/a
- Size: ~98,000 ly (30 kpc) (estimated)
- Apparent size (V): 1.0 x 0.3

Other designations
- CGCG 97-139, KCPG 300B, MCG 3-30-105, PGC 36675, UGC 6739

NGC 3875 is a lenticular galaxy located about 325 million light-years away in the constellation Leo. It was discovered by astronomer William Herschel on April 27, 1785 and is a member of the Leo Cluster.

== See also ==
- List of NGC objects (3001–4000)
