= NGC 3840 =

Spiral galaxy in the constellation Leo

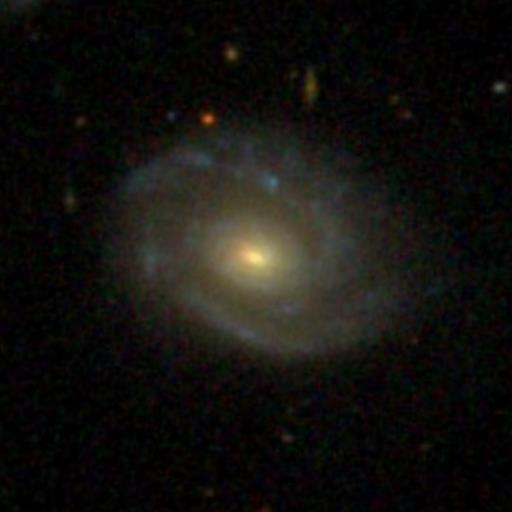
- SDSS image of NGC 3840

Observation data (J2000 epoch)
- Constellation: Leo
- Right ascension: 11^{h} 43^{m} 58.9^{s}
- Declination: 20° 04′ 37″
- Redshift: 0.024590
- Heliocentric radial velocity: 7372 km/s
- Distance: 318 Mly (97.5 Mpc)
- Group or cluster: Leo Cluster
- Apparent magnitude (V): 14.54

Characteristics
- Type: Sa
- Size: ~105,400 ly (32.32 kpc) (estimated)
- Apparent size (V): 1.1 x 0.8

Other designations
- CGCG 97-91, IRAS 11413+2021, MCG 3-30-70, PGC 36477, UGC 6702

NGC 3840 is a spiral galaxy located about 320 million light-years away in the constellation Leo. The galaxy was discovered by astronomer Heinrich d'Arrest on May 8, 1864. NGC 3840 is a member of the Leo Cluster. The galaxy is rich in neutral atomic hydrogen (H I) and is not interacting with its environment.

NGC 3840 is likely to be a low-luminosity AGN (LLAGN).

== See also ==
- List of NGC objects (3001–4000)
