= NGC 3857 =

Galaxy in the constellation Leo

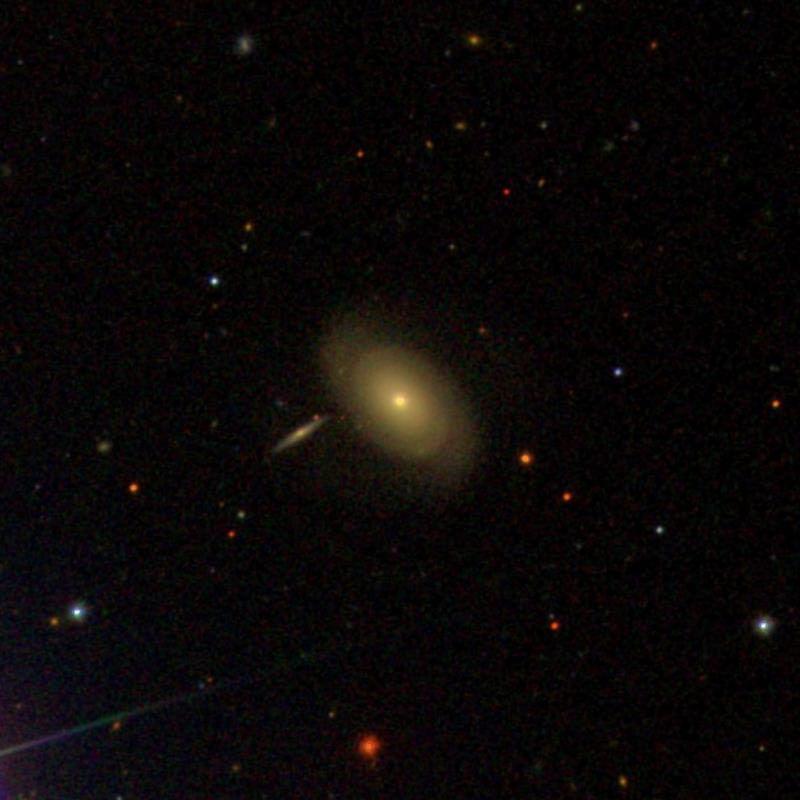
- SDSS image of NGC 3857

Observation data (J2000 epoch)
- Constellation: Leo
- Right ascension: 11^{h} 44^{m} 50.1^{s}
- Declination: 19° 31′ 58″
- Redshift: 0.020964
- Heliocentric radial velocity: 6285 km/s
- Distance: 294 Mly (90.2 Mpc)
- Group or cluster: Leo Cluster
- Apparent magnitude (V): 15.1

Characteristics
- Type: S0?
- Size: ~93,000 ly (28.5 kpc) (estimated)
- Apparent size (V): 1.0 x 0.6

Other designations
- CGCG 97-117, MCG 3-30-84, PGC 36548

NGC 3857 is a lenticular galaxy located about 295 million light-years away in the constellation Leo. The galaxy was discovered by astronomer by Édouard Stephan on March 23, 1884. It is a member of the Leo Cluster.

== See also ==
- List of NGC objects (3001–4000)
