= NGC 3868 =

Galaxy in the constellation Leo

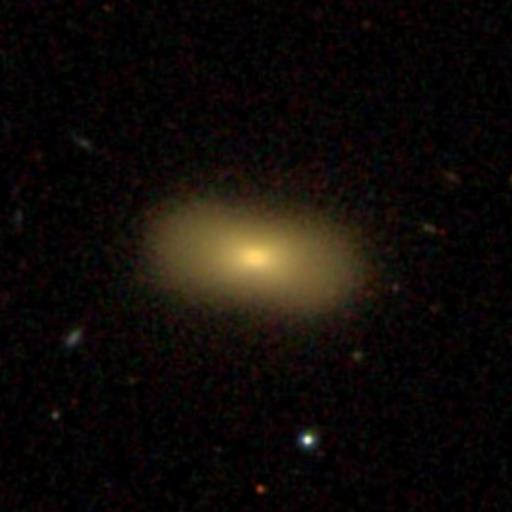
- SDSS image of NGC 3868.

Observation data (J2000 epoch)
- Constellation: Leo
- Right ascension: 11^{h} 45^{m} 29.9^{s}
- Declination: 19° 26′ 41″
- Redshift: 0.021351
- Heliocentric radial velocity: 6401 km/s
- Distance: 300 Mly (92 Mpc)
- Group or cluster: Leo Cluster
- Apparent magnitude (V): 15.30

Characteristics
- Type: S0
- Size: ~100,000 ly (30.7 kpc) (estimated)
- Apparent size (V): 0.8 x 0.3

Other designations
- MCG +03-30-104, PGC 36638, CGCG 097-135

NGC 3868 is a lenticular galaxy located about 300 million light-years away in the constellation Leo. NGC 3868 was discovered by astronomer Édouard Stephan on March 23, 1884. It is a member of the Leo Cluster.

== See also ==
- List of NGC objects (3001–4000)
