= NGC 3867 =

Spiral galaxy in the constellation Leo

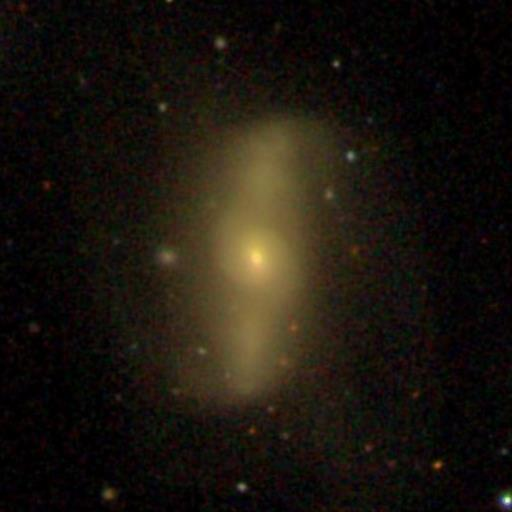
- SDSS image of NGC 3867.

Observation data (J2000 epoch)
- Constellation: Leo
- Right ascension: 11^{h} 45^{m} 29.6^{s}
- Declination: 19° 24′ 01″
- Redshift: 0.025084
- Heliocentric radial velocity: 7520 km/s
- Distance: 350 Mly (107 Mpc)
- Group or cluster: Leo Cluster
- Apparent magnitude (V): 14.20

Characteristics
- Type: Sab
- Size: ~170,000 ly (51 kpc) (estimated)
- Apparent size (V): 1.5 x 0.6

Other designations
- UGC 6731, MCG +03-30-103, PGC 36649, CGCG 097-134

NGC 3867 is a spiral galaxy located about 350 million light-years away in the constellation Leo. It was discovered by French astronomer Édouard Stephan on 23 March 1884, and is a member of the Leo Cluster.

== See also ==
- List of NGC objects (3001–4000)
