= NGC 3886 =

Galaxy in the constellation Leo

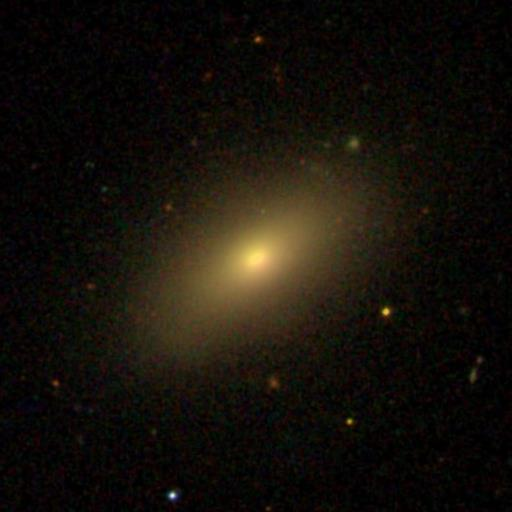
- SDSS image of NGC 3886.

Observation data (J2000 epoch)
- Constellation: Leo
- Right ascension: 11^{h} 47^{m} 05.6^{s}
- Declination: 19° 50′ 14″
- Redshift: 0.019667
- Heliocentric radial velocity: 5896 km/s
- Distance: 280 Mly (85 Mpc)
- Group or cluster: Leo Cluster
- Apparent magnitude (V): 14.11

Characteristics
- Type: S0^-
- Size: ~160,000 ly (49 kpc) (estimated)
- Apparent size (V): 1.2 x 0.9

Other designations
- CGCG 97-147, MCG 3-30-111, PGC 36756, UGC 6760

NGC 3886 is a lenticular galaxy located about 280 million light-years away in the constellation Leo. It was discovered by astronomer Heinrich d'Arrest on May 9, 1864. The galaxy is a member of the Leo Cluster.

== See also ==
- List of NGC objects (3001–4000)
