= NGC 3842 =

Galaxy in the constellation Leo

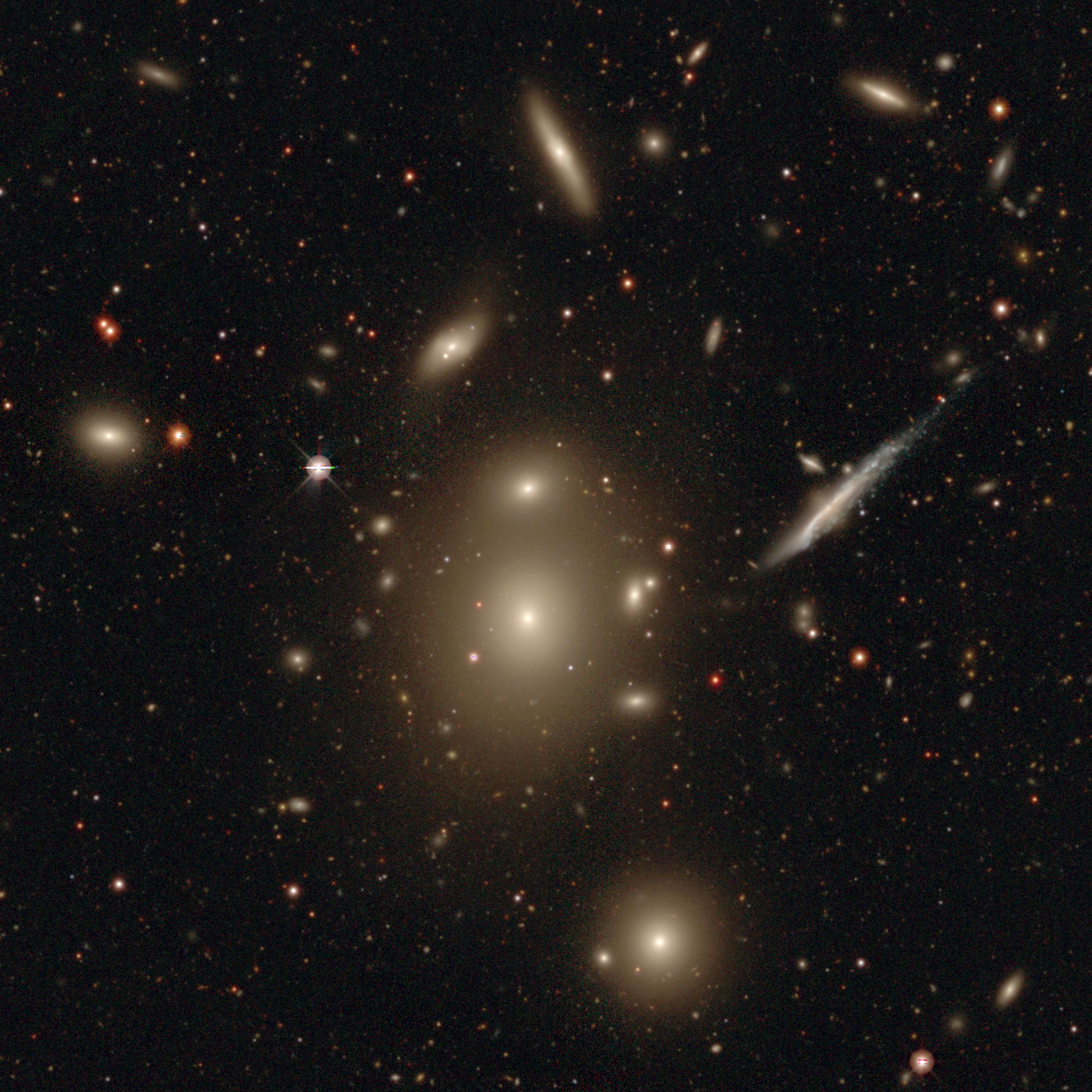
- legacy surveys image of NGC 3842 (center). The image also shows NGC 3837, NGC 3841, NGC 3844, NGC 3845, NGC 3851 and UGC 6697

Observation data (J2000 epoch)
- Constellation: Leo
- Right ascension: 11^{h} 44^{m} 02.2^{s}
- Declination: 19° 56′ 59.3″
- Redshift: 0.021068 ± 0.000031
- Heliocentric radial velocity: 6316 ± 9 km/s
- Distance: 325 Mly (99.6 Mpc)
- Group or cluster: Leo Cluster
- Apparent magnitude (V): 12.78

Characteristics
- Type: E
- Apparent size (V): 1.4 x 1.0
- Notable features: brightest member of the Leo Cluster, has a 34.6 billion solar mass black hole

Other designations
- UGC 6704, PGC 36487, MCG 3-30-72, ZWG 97.95,

NGC 3842 is an elliptical galaxy in the constellation of Leo. It was discovered by William Herschel. It is notable for containing one of the largest black holes ever detected, reported to have a current estimated mass of 34.6+63.0
−22.4 billion solar masses (M_{☉}) based on the break radius method (with the range being 12.2 billion M_{☉} to 97.6 billion M_{☉}). Previous estimates yield at least 9.7+3.0
−2.5 billion solar masses (M_{☉}). It is around 330 million light-years (101.18 million parsecs) distant from Earth.

NGC 3842 is the brightest member of the Leo Cluster.
