= NGC 3859 =

Spiral galaxy in the constellation Leo

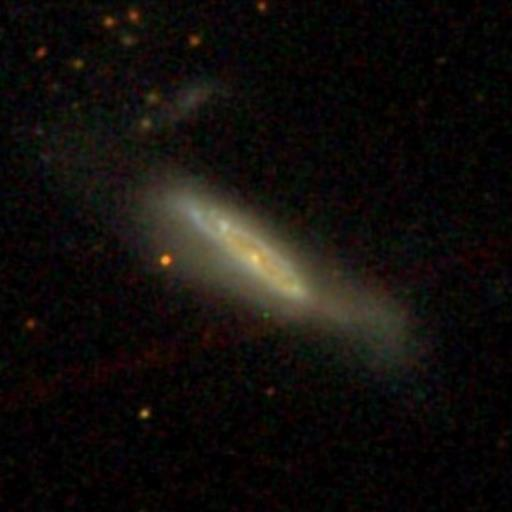
- SDSS image of NGC 3859.

Observation data (J2000 epoch)
- Constellation: Leo
- Right ascension: 11^{h} 44^{m} 52.2^{s}
- Declination: 19° 27′ 15″
- Redshift: 0.018239
- Heliocentric radial velocity: 5468 km/s
- Distance: 295 Mly (90.4 Mpc)
- Group or cluster: Leo Cluster
- Apparent magnitude (V): 14.76

Characteristics
- Type: S? pec
- Size: ~135,000 ly (41.5 kpc) (estimated)
- Apparent size (V): 1.2 x 0.3

Other designations
- CGCG 97-122, IRAS 11423+1943, MCG 3-30-91, PGC 36582, UGC 6721

NGC 3859 is a spiral galaxy located about 295 million light-years away in the constellation Leo. It was discovered by astronomer Édouard Stephan on March 23, 1884. The galaxy is a member of the Leo Cluster.

== Physical characteristics ==
Deep imaging of NGC 3859 by Yagi et al. have revealed a distorted faint halo which is elongated toward the northeast along the major axis of the galaxy. On the southwestern side of the galaxy, the halo extends about ~33,000 ly (10 kpc) above the disk of the galaxy. To the north, there is a small dwarf galaxy which is possibly an interacting companion. A part of the extended halo of NGC 3859 may be the result of an interaction between the dwarf and NGC 3859.

=== Hα emission ===
The bright disk Hα emission in the disk together with the very blue color of the galaxy and the emission line dominated nuclear spectrum indicate that NGC 3859 is a starburst galaxy. The morphology of the Hα emission of NGC 3859 is peculiar, characterized by two narrow spurs which extend to the northwest and the southeast from the galaxy disk. Their widths are ~6,500 ly (2 kpc) and ~33,000 ly (10 kpc) respectively. The morphology and size of the two spurs of NGC 3859 are quite similar to the Hα nebula and extended ionized gas cloud which suggest that the spurs originated in a starburst superbubble or superwind. The northern part of an Hα nebula of NGC 3859 seems to be flowing toward the northeast. Also, the two spurs of the galaxy are bending in the same direction. These morphological characteristics suggest that the hot gas of the galaxy is being affected by ram pressure from the southwest. However, there is no indication of one-sided elongation of ionized gas within the galaxy. There is also no sharp cutoff at the southwest edge of the Hα nebula, and no extended part of the Hα emission out of the galaxy to the northeast, but it shows an extension toward the east-southeast. In addition, the northern faint flowing part of the nebular continuum is overlapped by the dwarf companion galaxy suggesting that this part of the Hα nebula could have been formed by a galaxy interaction rather than ram pressure. Therefore, ram pressure stripping may not be strong enough to create the overall structure of the extended ionized gas cloud (EIG) around NGC 3859.

== SN 2014U ==
On February 23, 2014, a Type II supernova designated as SN 2014U was discovered in NGC 3859.

== See also ==
- List of NGC objects (3001–4000)
- NGC 3079-galaxy with starburst superbubble
- Messier 82-nearby galaxy undergoing a starburst
