= NGC 3851 =

Elliptical or lenticular galaxy in the constellation Leo

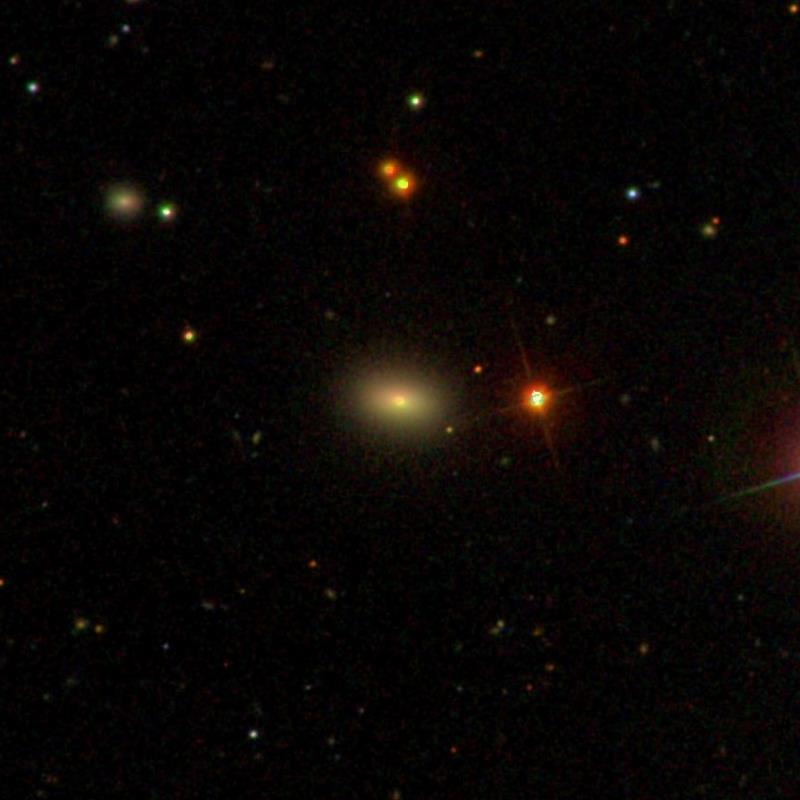
- SDSS image of NGC 3851

Observation data (J2000 epoch)
- Constellation: Leo
- Right ascension: 11^{h} 44^{m} 20.4^{s}
- Declination: 19° 58′ 51″
- Redshift: 0.021365
- Heliocentric radial velocity: 6405 km/s
- Distance: 300 Mly (92 Mpc)
- Group or cluster: Leo Cluster
- Apparent magnitude (V): 15.1

Characteristics
- Type: E/S0
- Size: ~78,000 ly (24 kpc) (estimated)
- Apparent size (V): 0.25 × 0.2

Other designations
- ARAK 316, CGCG 97-106, MCG 3-30-77, PGC 36516

NGC 3851 is an elliptical or lenticular galaxy located about 300 million light-years away in the constellation Leo. It was discovered by astronomer John Herschel on February 24, 1827 and is a member of the Leo Cluster.

== See also ==
- List of NGC objects (3001–4000)
