= NGC 3841 =

Galaxy in the constellation Leo

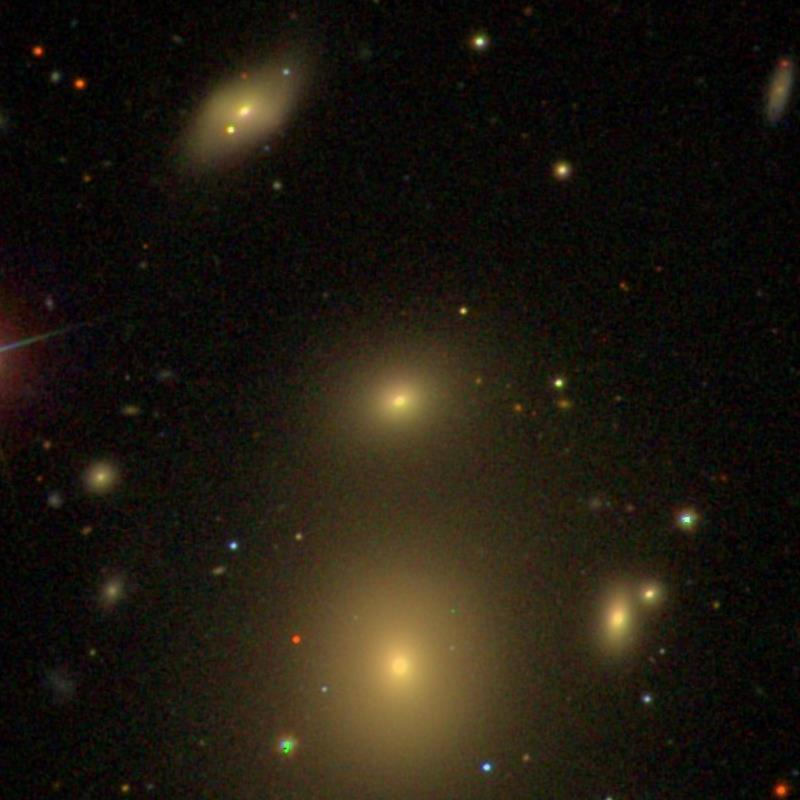
- SDSS image of NGC 3841

Observation data (J2000 epoch)
- Constellation: Leo
- Right ascension: 11^{h} 44^{m} 02.1^{s}
- Declination: 19° 58′ 19″
- Redshift: 0.021201
- Heliocentric radial velocity: 6356 km/s
- Distance: 297 Mly (91.1 Mpc)
- Group or cluster: Leo Cluster
- Apparent magnitude (V): 14.59

Characteristics
- Type: E-S0
- Size: ~69,000 ly (21.1 kpc) (estimated)
- Apparent size (V): 0.7 x 0.7

Other designations
- CGCG 97-96, MCG 3-30-73, PGC 36469

NGC 3841 is an elliptical or lenticular galaxy located about 300 million light-years away in the constellation Leo. It was discovered by astronomer John Herschel on March 25, 1827 is a member of the Leo Cluster.

On November 17, 2006 a Type Ia supernova designated as SN 2006oq was found near NGC 3841. However it was not associated with the galaxy.

== See also ==
- List of NGC objects (3001–4000)
