= NGC 3845 =

Galaxy in the constellation Leo

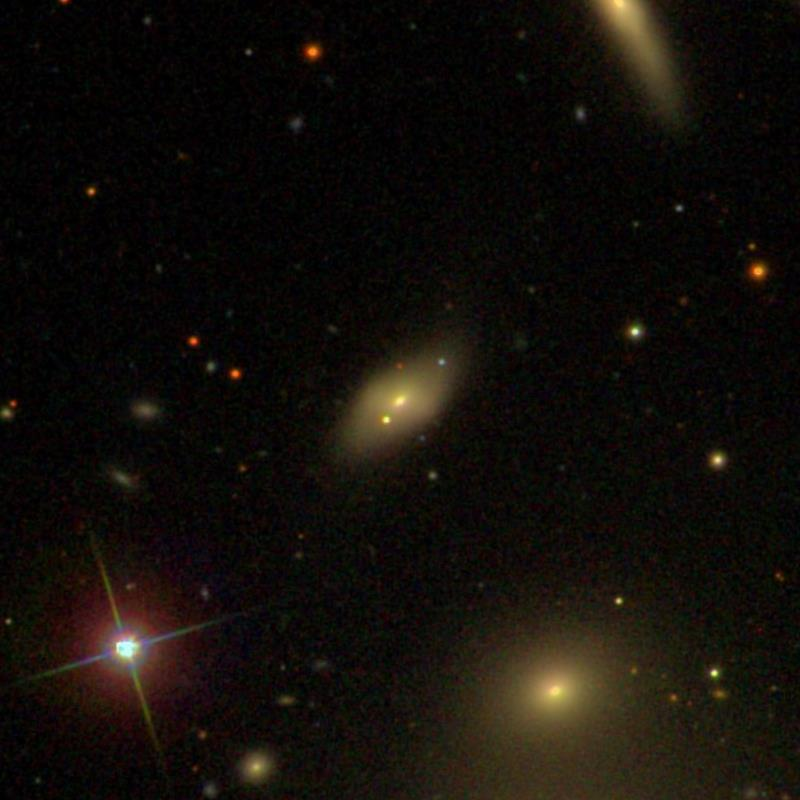
- SDSS image of NGC 3845

Observation data (J2000 epoch)
- Constellation: Leo
- Right ascension: 11^{h} 44^{m} 05.4^{s}
- Declination: 19° 59′ 46″
- Redshift: 0.018986
- Heliocentric radial velocity: 5692 km/s
- Distance: 268 Mly (82.1 Mpc)
- Group or cluster: Leo Cluster
- Apparent magnitude (V): 15.01

Characteristics
- Type: SB0
- Size: ~78,900 ly (24.20 kpc) (estimated)
- Apparent size (V): 0.8 x 0.3

Other designations
- CGCG 97-100, MCG 3-30-74, PGC 36470

NGC 3845 is a barred lenticular galaxy located about 270 million light-years away in the constellation Leo. NGC 3845 was discovered by astronomer John Herschel on March 17, 1831. It is a member of the Leo Cluster and is likely to be a low-luminosity AGN (LLAGN).

== See also ==
- List of NGC objects (3001–4000)
- NGC 4340
