= NGC 3844 =

Galaxy in the constellation Leo

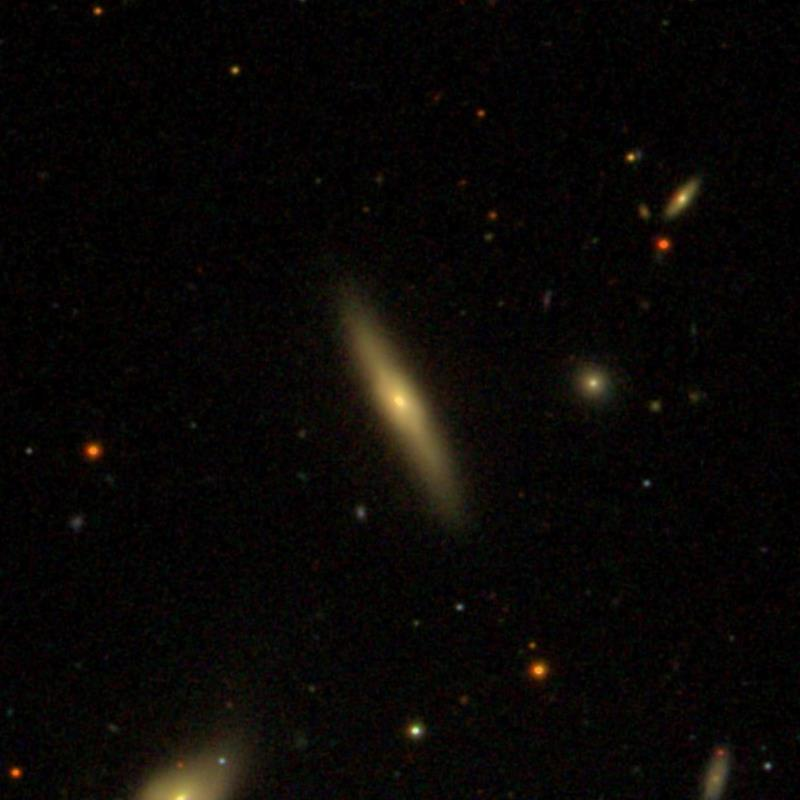
- SDSS image of NGC 3844

Observation data (J2000 epoch)
- Constellation: Leo
- Right ascension: 11^{h} 44^{m} 00.8^{s}
- Declination: 20° 01′ 46″
- Redshift: 0.022612
- Heliocentric radial velocity: 6779 km/s
- Distance: 320 Mly (97 Mpc)
- Group or cluster: Leo Cluster
- Apparent magnitude (V): 14.85

Characteristics
- Type: S0/a
- Size: ~136,000 ly (41.6 kpc) (estimated)
- Apparent size (V): 1.2 x 0.2

Other designations
- CGCG 97-97, MCG 3-30-69, PGC 36481, UGC 6705

NGC 3844 is a lenticular galaxy located about 320 million light-years away in the constellation Leo. The galaxy was discovered by astronomer Heinrich d'Arrest on May 8, 1864. NGC 3844 is a member of the Leo Cluster and is likely to be a low-luminosity AGN (LLAGN).

== See also ==
- List of NGC objects (3001–4000)
