= NGC 3910 =

Lenticular galaxy in the constellation of Leo

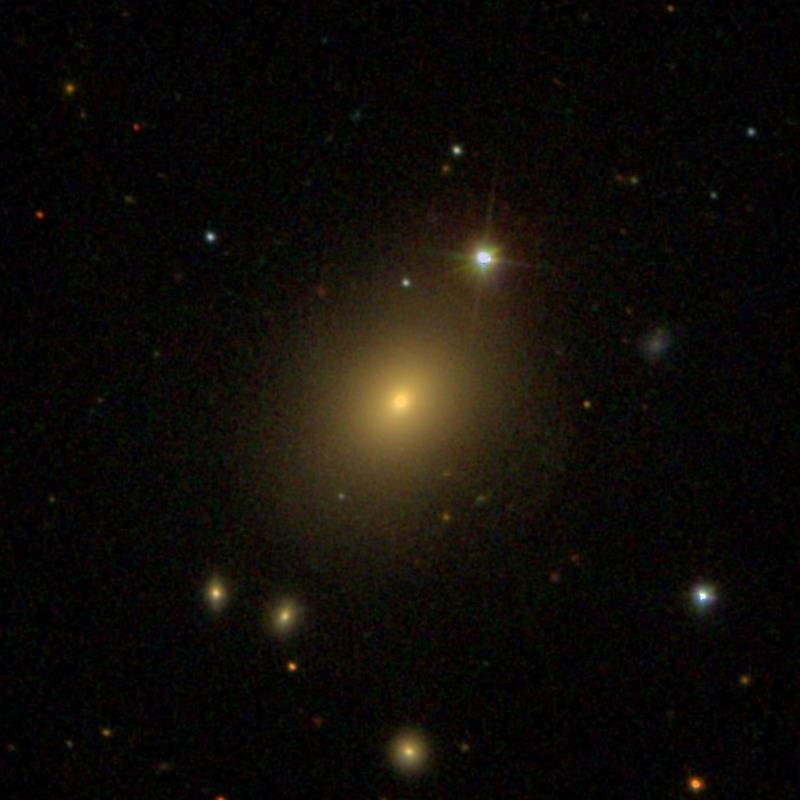
- SDSS image of NGC 3910

Observation data (J2000 epoch)
- Constellation: Leo
- Right ascension: 11^{h} 49^{m} 59.3^{s}
- Declination: 21° 20′ 01″
- Redshift: 0.026248
- Heliocentric radial velocity: 7869 km/s
- Distance: 370 Mly (112 Mpc)
- Group or cluster: NGC 3937 Group
- Apparent magnitude (V): 13.83
- Absolute magnitude (B): -23.42

Characteristics
- Type: S0
- Size: ~182,400 ly (55.91 kpc) (estimated)
- Apparent size (V): 1.6′ × 1.2′

Other designations
- UGC 06800, MCG +04-28-058, PGC 036971

NGC 3910 is a lenticular galaxy located 370 million light-years away in the constellation Leo. It was discovered on December 27, 1786, by astronomer William Herschel. NGC 3910 is a member of the NGC 3937 Group.

NGC 3910 has a supermassive black hole with an estimated mass of 2.8 × 10^{9} M_{☉}.

== Supernovae ==
Two supernovae have been observed in NGC 3910:

- SN 2013hl (Type Ia, mag. 16.7) was discovered by Kōichi Itagaki on 13 December 2013.
- PSN J11495885+2119018 (Type Ia-91bg, mag. 19.6) was discovered by the Catalina Real-time Transient Survey on 10 February 2015.

== See also ==
- NGC 3937
