= NGC 3862 =

Galaxy in the constellation Leo

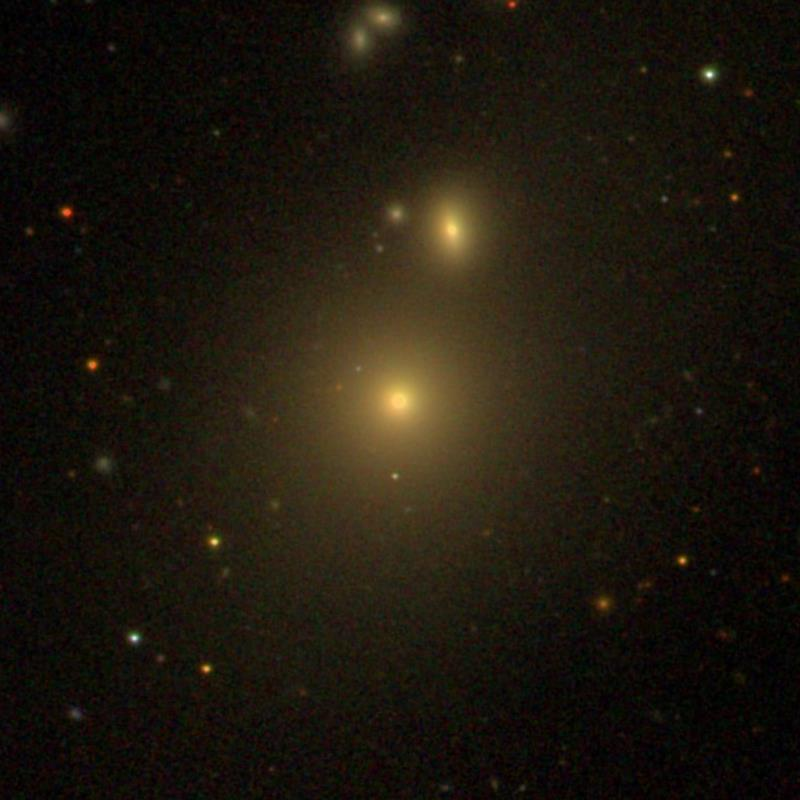
- SDSS image of NGC 3862. The small galaxy at the top of the image is IC 2955.

Observation data (J2000 epoch)
- Constellation: Leo
- Right ascension: 11^{h} 45^{m} 05.0^{s}
- Declination: 19° 36′ 23″
- Redshift: 0.021718 ± 0.000019
- Heliocentric radial velocity: 6511 ± 6 km/s
- Distance: 304 Mly (93.3 Mpc)
- Group or cluster: Leo Cluster
- Apparent magnitude (V): 13.67

Characteristics
- Type: E
- Size: ~152,000 ly (46.6 kpc) (estimated)
- Apparent size (V): 1.5 x 1.5
- Notable features: contains a supermassive black hole powering a jet of plasma that is moving at 98 percent of the speed of light

Other designations
- UGC 06723, PGC 036606, MCG +03-30-095, CGCG 097-127, 3C 264, 4C +19.40, PKS 1142+19

NGC 3862 is an elliptical galaxy located 300 million light-years away in the constellation Leo. Discovered by astronomer William Herschel on April 27, 1785, NGC 3862 is an outlying member of the Leo Cluster.

The galaxy is classified as a FR I radio galaxy and as a Head-tail radio galaxy. It hosts a supermassive black hole that is blasting a jet of plasma that is moving at 98 percent of the speed of light and is one of the few jets that can be seen in visible light.

== Supernova ==
One supernova has been observed in NGC 3862:

- SN 2023bqk (Type Ia-pec, mag. 18.325) was discovered by ATLAS on 13 February 2023.

== Jet ==
Observations made by Bridle et al. in 1981 using maps made with the VLA revealed a jet-like structure emerging from the nucleus of NGC 3862. In late January 1992, the Hubble Space Telescope observed NGC 3862 with the Faint Object Spectrograph and confirmed the presence of an optical jet in the nucleus of NGC 3862.

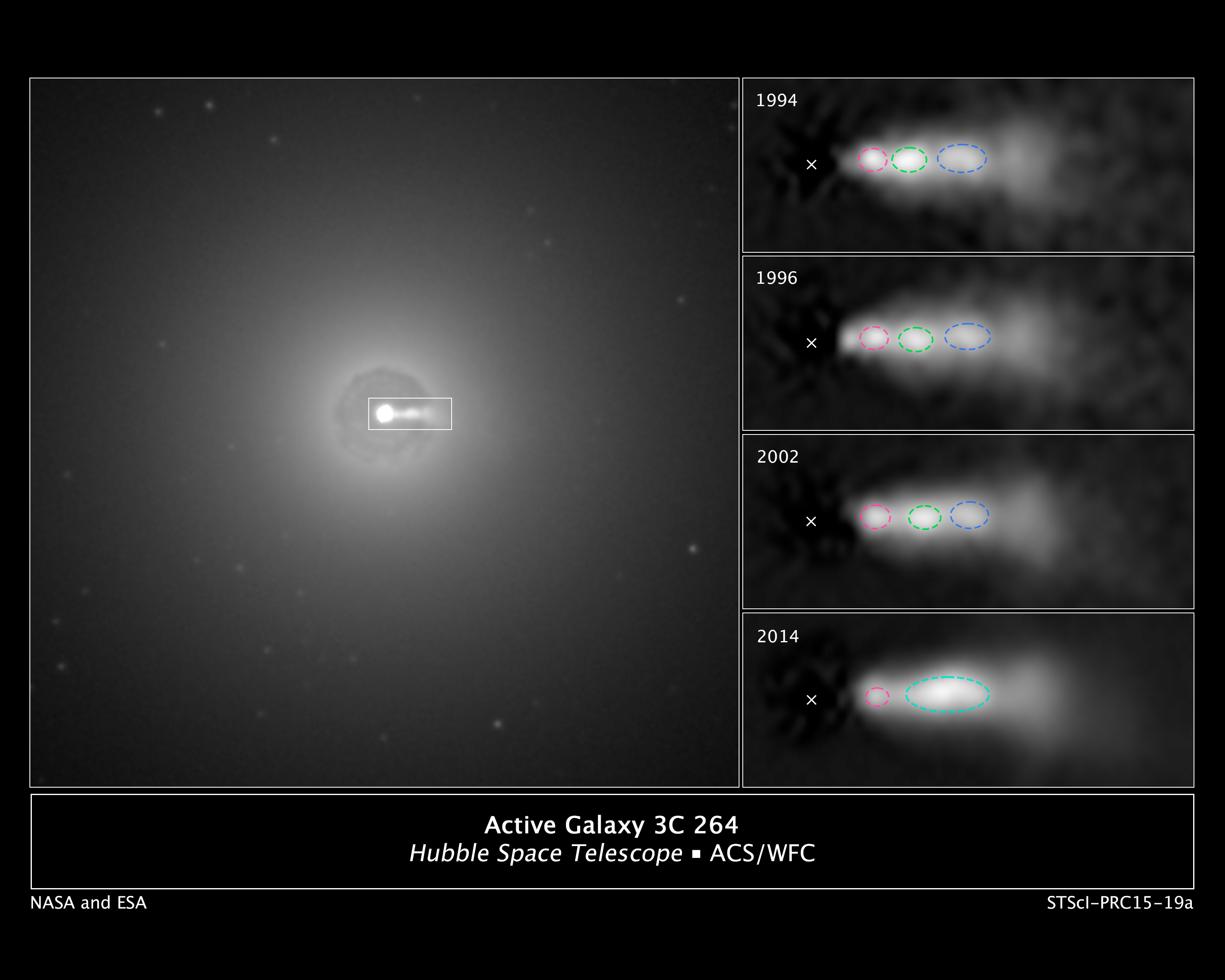
A sequence of Hubble Space Telescope images taken between 1994 and 2014 showing the jet in NGC 3862.

The optical jet, which has a measured length of 2,800 ly (860 pc), appears to expand slowly and dims in peak and integrated brightness within the interior of the apparent ring of dust. Within distances of about 260–360 ly (80–110 pc), the jet appears narrow and well-collimated. At a distance of 330 ly (100 pc) the jet starts to abruptly expand and becomes turbulent. At this distance, filaments and pronounced kinks can be observed which suggests that the jet is oscillating or evolving a helical structure. After crossing the ring at a distance of around 980–1,300 ly (300–400 pc), the jet widens dramatically, changes direction, and dims more rapidly both in peak and integrated brightness and becomes more diffuse in appearance. This suggests that the jet is interacting with the dust ring and becomes less collimated. However, Perlman et al. suggests that the disk and the jet occupy physically distinct regions of the galaxy and therefore are not interacting.

The total amount of energy produced by the jet is estimated to be around 3.71 × 10^{42} ergs.

=== Knots ===
The jet of NGC 3862 contains four faint knots of material designated in increasing order from the nucleus: Knot A, B, C and D. The knots exhibit a structure similar to that of a string of pearls.

== Radio morphology ==
NGC 3862 contains a Head-tail radio morphology with two tails that extend 520,000 ly (160 kpc). This morphology appears to be the result of the galaxy interacting with the intracluster medium (ICM).

== Nucleus ==
The central region of NGC 3862 appears host a nearly face-on disk of dust with a diameter of 2,200 ly (675 pc). However, as the jet of galaxy has been suggested to lie at angle of 50° to Earth's line of sight, the dust disk must be puffed up in order for the jet to have been disturbed by the disk. The emission of CO in the nucleus exhibits a double-horned line profile which suggests that the dust disk is rotating. The inferred distribution of the CO is consistent with the observed dust disk and the presence of the molecular gas suggests that the gas originated from either a merger with two gas-rich galaxies a few billion years ago or from cannibalism of smaller gas-rich galaxies.

Hutchings et al. proposed instead that the apparent disk represents an evacuated region cleared of dust by some nuclear related process or by the jet itself as indicated by the color of the region inside the ring being similar to the color of the galaxy spectrum. Lara et al. also suggested this as the jet appears to widen within the apparent ring which would be consistent with an explanation of a favored expansion of the jet due to the lower density medium within the evacuated region or bubble.

== Supermassive black hole ==
NGC 3862 contains a supermassive black hole with an estimated mass of 4.7×10^{8} M☉, which is responsible for producing the jet of plasma that is moving at nearly the speed of light.

== Companion galaxies ==
NGC 3862 has an elliptical or a lenticular companion galaxy known as IC 2955. It lies about 72,000 ly (22 kpc) from NGC 3862.

== See also ==
- 3C 273 – famous quasar with optical jet
- List of NGC objects (3001–4000)
- Messier 87 – nearby giant elliptical galaxy with optical jet
- NGC 3842 – giant elliptical galaxy in the center of the Leo Cluster
