= NGC 3943 =

Galaxy in the constellation Leo

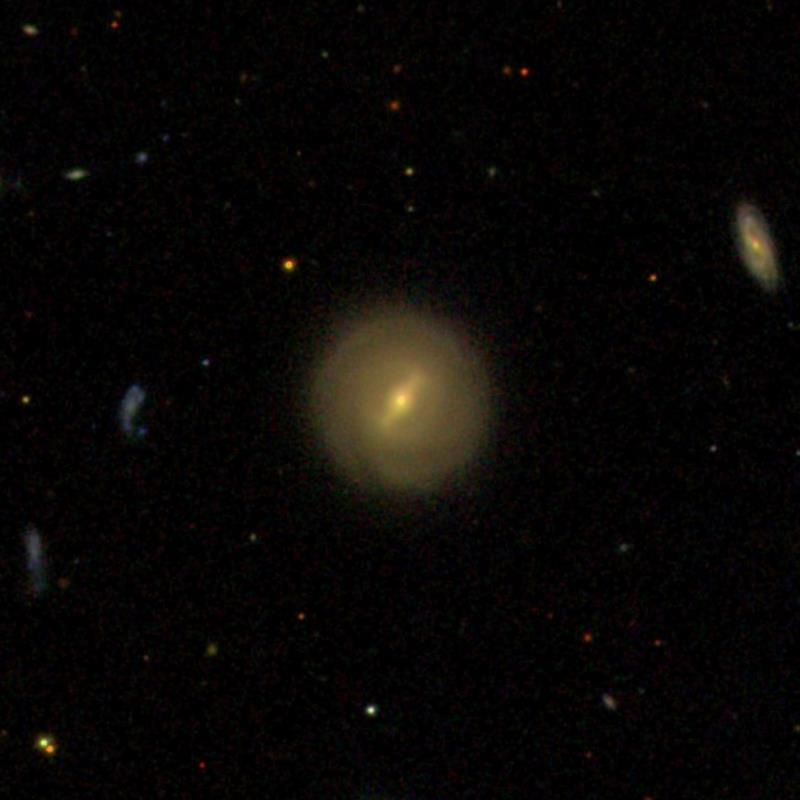
- SDSS image of NGC 3943

Observation data (J2000 epoch)
- Constellation: Leo
- Right ascension: 11^{h} 52^{m} 56.6^{s}
- Declination: +20° 28′ 45″
- Redshift: 0.021745
- Heliocentric radial velocity: 6519 km/s
- Distance: 304 Mly (93.3 Mpc)
- Group or cluster: NGC 3937 Group
- Apparent magnitude (V): 14.29
- Absolute magnitude (B): -17.91

Characteristics
- Type: S0/a
- Apparent size (V): 1.1′ × 1.1′

Other designations
- MCG +04-28-084, PGC 037237

NGC 3943 is a barred lenticular galaxy, located 304 million light-years away in the constellation Leo. It was discovered on April 27, 1865, by astronomer Heinrich d'Arrest. NGC 3943 is a LINER galaxy, and is a member of the NGC 3937 Group.

NGC 3943 has a supermassive black hole with an estimated mass of 2.4 × 10^{8} M_{☉}.

== See also ==
- NGC 3937
