= NGC 3816 =

Lenticular galaxy in the constellation Leo

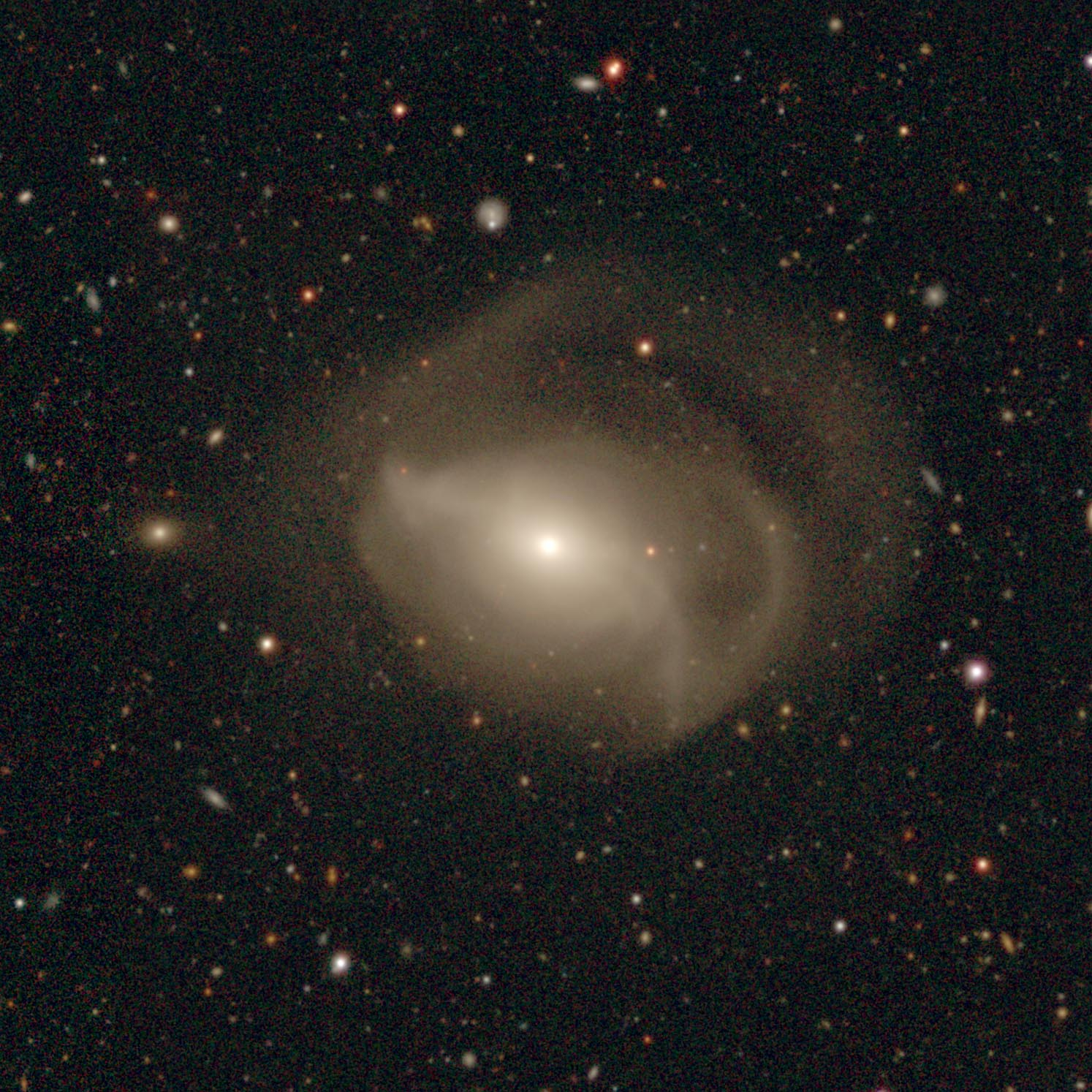
- legacy surveys image of NGC 3816.

Observation data (J2000 epoch)
- Constellation: Leo
- Right ascension: 11^{h} 41^{m} 48.0^{s}
- Declination: 20° 06′ 13″
- Redshift: 0.019233
- Heliocentric radial velocity: 5766 km/s
- Distance: 271 Mly (83.1 Mpc)
- Group or cluster: Leo Cluster
- Apparent magnitude (V): 13.46

Characteristics
- Type: S0
- Size: ~160,000 ly (48 kpc) (estimated)
- Apparent size (V): 1.9 x 1.1

Other designations
- CGCG 97-60, MCG 3-30-46, PGC 36292, UGC 6656

NGC 3816 is a lenticular galaxy located about 270 million light-years away in the constellation Leo. It was discovered by astronomer Heinrich d'Arrest on May 9, 1864. NGC 3816 is a member of the Leo Cluster.

== See also ==
- List of NGC objects (3001–4000)
