= NGC 3837 =

Elliptical galaxy in the constellation Leo

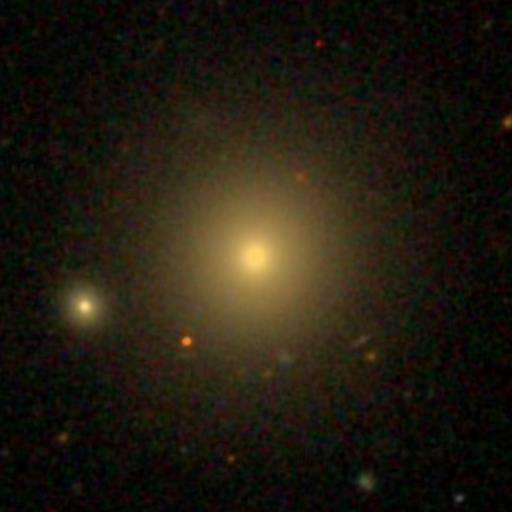
- SDSS image of NGC 3837.

Observation data (J2000 epoch)
- Constellation: Leo
- Right ascension: 11^{h} 43^{m} 56.4^{s}
- Declination: 19° 53′ 40″
- Redshift: 0.020447
- Heliocentric radial velocity: 6130 km/s
- Distance: 287 Mly (88.1 Mpc)
- Group or cluster: Leo Cluster
- Apparent magnitude (V): 14.25

Characteristics
- Type: E
- Size: ~129,000 ly (39.4 kpc) (estimated)
- Apparent size (V): 0.6 x 0.6

Other designations
- ARAK 314, CGCG 97-89, MCG 3-30-68, PGC 36476, UGC 6701

NGC 3837 is an elliptical galaxy located about 290 million light-years away in the constellation Leo. It was discovered by astronomer William Herschel on April 26, 1785. NGC 3837 is a member of the Leo Cluster.

== See also ==
- List of NGC objects (3001–4000)
- NGC 3842
