= NGC 3883 =

Galaxy in the constellation Leo

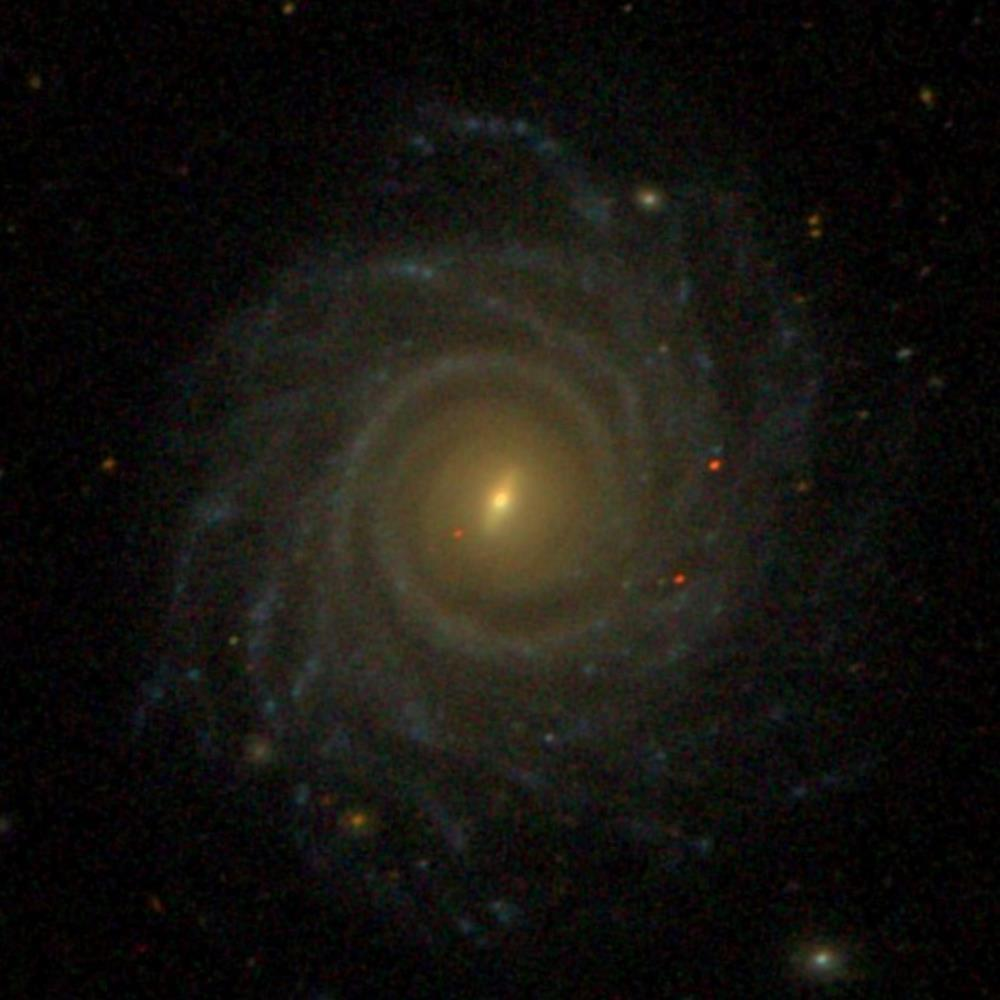
- SDSS image of NGC 3883.

Observation data (J2000 epoch)
- Constellation: Leo
- Right ascension: 11^{h} 46^{m} 47.2^{s}
- Declination: 20° 40′ 32″
- Redshift: 0.023433
- Heliocentric radial velocity: 7025 km/s
- Distance: 330 Mly (100 Mpc)
- Group or cluster: Leo Cluster
- Apparent magnitude (V): 13.40

Characteristics
- Type: SA(rs)b
- Size: ~349,500 ly (107.15 kpc) (estimated)
- Apparent size (V): 3.0 x 2.4

Other designations
- CGCG 127-54, MCG 4-28-53, NPM1G +20.0286, PGC 36740, UGC 6754

NGC 3883 is a large low surface brightness spiral galaxy located about 330 million light-years away in the constellation Leo. NGC 3883 has a prominent bulge but does not host an AGN. The galaxy also has flocculent spiral arms in its disk. It was discovered by astronomer William Herschel on April 13, 1785 and is a member of the Leo Cluster.

== Star formation ==
Despite being rich in neutral atomic hydrogen (HI), NGC 3883 is very red and has a low amount of H-alpha emission. This suggests the star formation in the galaxy ended a long time ago while the inner regions continued to form stars that enriched the interstellar medium (ISM) and eventually used up the remaining gas. Possibly, the outer regions of NGC 3883 went through only a few generations of star formation because the HI density has been low throughout the galaxy's life. However, J. Donas et al. suggests that the UV emission of NGC 3883 which comes mainly from the disk of the galaxy is coming from young intermediate mass stars and reveals star formation in the outer regions of NGC 3883.

Because of a low amount of star formation ongoing in NGC 3883, it has been classified as an anemic galaxy.

== See also ==
- List of NGC objects (3001–4000)
- NGC 4921, An anemic spiral galaxy in the Coma Cluster
- Malin 1, A giant low surface brightness galaxy
