= NGC 3805 =

Lenticular galaxy in the constellation Leo

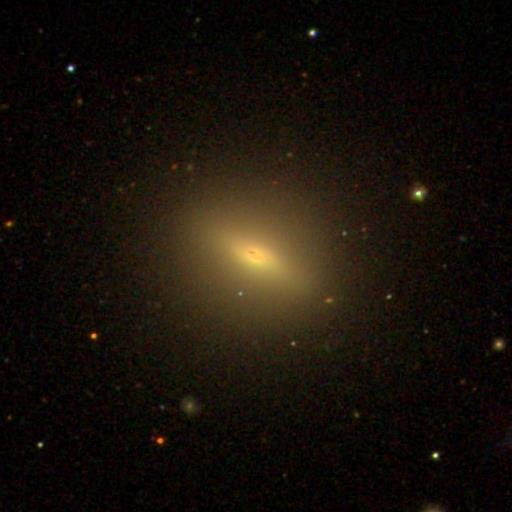
- SDSS image of NGC 3805.

Observation data (J2000 epoch)
- Constellation: Leo
- Right ascension: 11^{h} 40^{m} 41.7^{s}
- Declination: 20° 20′ 35″
- Redshift: 0.022112
- Heliocentric radial velocity: 6629 km/s
- Distance: 327 Mly (100.4 Mpc)
- Group or cluster: Leo Cluster
- Apparent magnitude (V): 13.65

Characteristics
- Type: S0^-
- Size: ~145,400 ly (44.58 kpc) (estimated)
- Apparent size (V): 1.4 x 1.1

Other designations
- UGC 06642, CGCG 127-024, MCG +04-28-019, PGC 036224

NGC 3805 is a lenticular galaxy located about 330 million light-years away in the constellation Leo. The galaxy was discovered by astronomer William Herschel on April 25, 1785. NGC 3805 is a member of the Leo Cluster.

== See also ==
- List of NGC objects (3001–4000)
