= NGC 3947 =

Galaxy in the constellation Leo

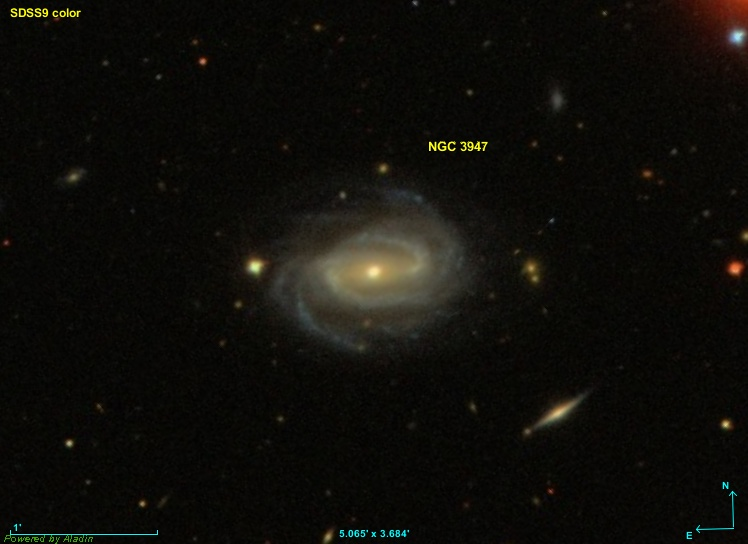
- NGC 3947 imaged by SDSS

Observation data (J2000 epoch)
- Constellation: Leo
- Right ascension: 11^{h} 53^{m} 20.3285^{s}
- Declination: +20° 45′ 06.049″
- Redshift: 0.020698
- Heliocentric radial velocity: 6205 ± 2 km/s
- Distance: 314.0 ± 22.0 Mly (96.28 ± 6.75 Mpc)
- Group or cluster: NGC 3937 Group
- Apparent magnitude (V): 13.2

Characteristics
- Type: (R)SB(rs)b
- Size: ~153,100 ly (46.93 kpc) (estimated)
- Apparent size (V): 1.4′ × 1.2′

Other designations
- IRAS 11507+2101, 2MASX J11532031+2045055, UGC 6863, MCG +04-28-088, PGC 37264, CGCG 127-095

NGC 3947 is a barred spiral galaxy in the constellation of Leo. Its velocity with respect to the cosmic microwave background is 6528 ± 23 km/s, which corresponds to a Hubble distance of 314.0 ± 22.0 Mly (96.28 ± 6.75 Mpc). In addition, three non redshift measurements give a distance of 284.67 ± 12.90 Mly (87.28 ± 3.956 Mpc). It was discovered by German-British astronomer William Herschel on 26 April 1785.

NGC 3947 has a supermassive black hole with an estimated mass of 9.4 × 10^{7} M_{☉}.

== Supernovae ==
Four supernovae have been observed in NGC 3947:

- SN 1972C (type unknown, mag. 16) was discovered by Charles Kowal on 18 January 1972.
- SN 2001P (Type Ia, mag. 17.5) was discovered by LOTOSS (Lick Observatory and Tenagra Observatory Supernova Searches) on 31 January 2001.
- SN 2006aa (Type IIn, mag. 18.1) was discovered by the Lick Observatory Supernova Survey (LOSS) on 8 February 2006.
- SN 2013G (Type Ia, mag. 16) was discovered by the Catalina Sky Survey on 5 January 2013.

== Nearby galaxies ==
NGC 3947 is a member of the NGC 3937 Group, which is part of the Coma Supercluster.

== See also ==
- List of NGC objects (3001–4000)
