= NGC 3884 =

Spiral galaxy in the constellation Leo

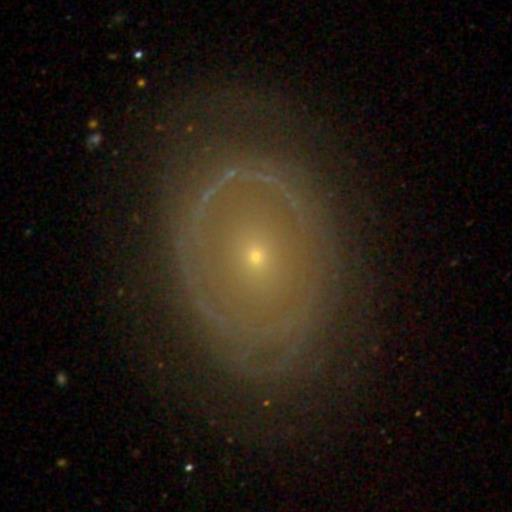
- SDSS image of NGC 3884

Observation data (J2000 epoch)
- Constellation: Leo
- Right ascension: 11^{h} 46^{m} 12.1878^{s}
- Declination: +20° 23′ 30.023″
- Redshift: 0.023123
- Heliocentric radial velocity: 6932 ± 2 km/s
- Distance: 334.80 ± 31.76 Mly (102.650 ± 9.738 Mpc)
- Group or cluster: Leo Cluster
- Apparent magnitude (V): 13.5

Characteristics
- Type: SA(r)0/a, LINER
- Size: ~243,500 ly (74.65 kpc) (estimated)
- Apparent size (V): 1.64′ × 1.10′

Other designations
- UGC 6746, MCG +04-28-051, PGC 36706, CGCG 127-052

NGC 3884 is a spiral galaxy located about 330 million light-years away in the constellation Leo. The galaxy was discovered by astronomer William Herschel on April 27, 1785 and is a member of the Leo Cluster.

Although it is classified as a LINER galaxy, NGC 3884 is also classified as a type 1 Seyfert galaxy.

One supernova has been observed in NGC 3884. SN 2018yn (Type Ic, mag. 18) was discovered by POSS on February 23, 2018.

== See also ==
- List of NGC objects (3001–4000)
