= NGC 3937 =

Elliptical or lenticular galaxy in the constellation Leo

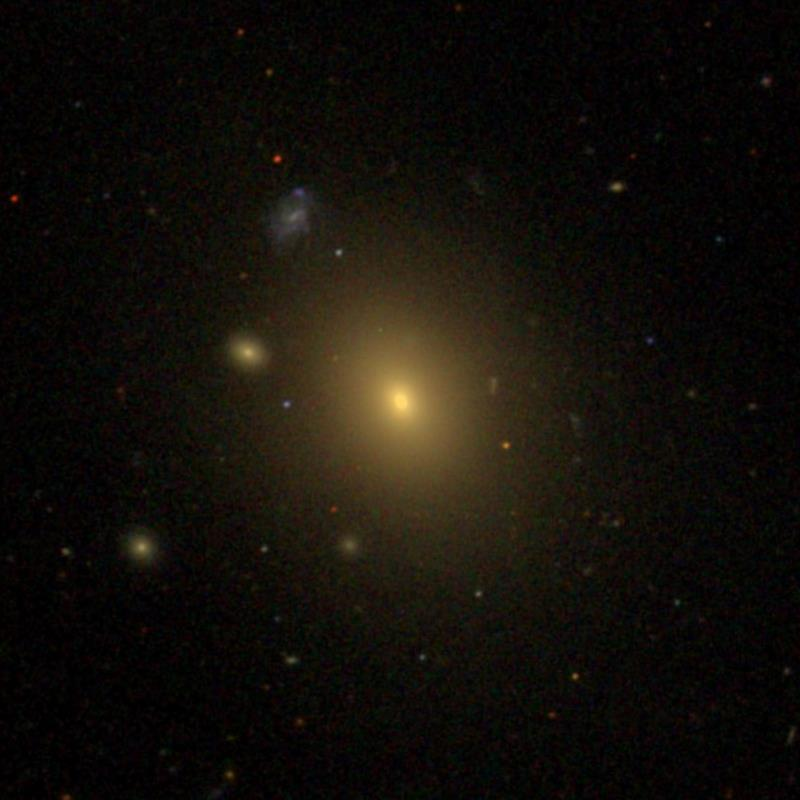
- SDSS image of NGC 3937.

Observation data (J2000 epoch)
- Constellation: Leo
- Right ascension: 11^{h} 52^{m} 42.6^{s}
- Declination: 20° 37′ 53″
- Redshift: 0.022242
- Heliocentric radial velocity: 6668 km/s
- Distance: 311 Mly (95.3 Mpc)
- Group or cluster: NGC 3937 Group
- Apparent magnitude (V): 13.43
- Absolute magnitude (B): -23.34

Characteristics
- Type: E, S0^-
- Size: ~200,000 ly (62 kpc) (estimated)
- Apparent size (V): 1.8 x 1.6

Other designations
- UGC 06851, PGC 037219, MCG +04-28-081

NGC 3937 is an elliptical or a lenticular galaxy located about 310 million light-years away in the constellation Leo. It was discovered by astronomer William Herschel on April 27, 1785 and is classified as a radio galaxy.

NGC 3937 is host to supermassive black hole with an estimated mass of 3.7 × 10^{9} M_{☉}.

== NGC 3937 Group ==
NGC 3937 is the brightest member of the NGC 3937 Group, which is part of the Coma Supercluster. The group has a velocity dispersion of 306 km/s. Other members of the group are NGC 3910, NGC 3929, NGC 3940, NGC 3943, NGC 3947, NGC 3954, with NGC 3919 having an uncertain membership.

== See also ==
- List of NGC objects (3001–4000)
