= NGC 3940 =

Galaxy in the constellation Leo

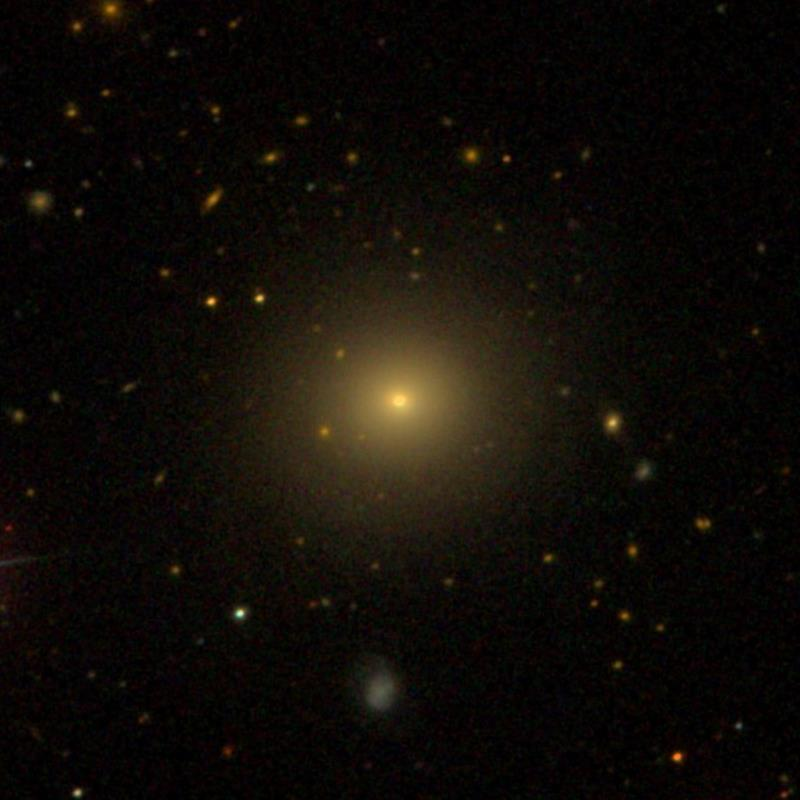
- SDSS image of NGC 3940

Observation data (J2000 epoch)
- Constellation: Leo
- Right ascension: 11^{h} 52^{m} 46.4^{s}
- Declination: +20° 59′ 21″
- Redshift: 0.021415
- Heliocentric radial velocity: 6420 km/s
- Distance: 300 Mly (91.9 Mpc)
- Group or cluster: NGC 3937 Group
- Apparent magnitude (V): 13.8
- Absolute magnitude (B): -22.87

Characteristics
- Type: E
- Size: ~172,800 ly (52.97 kpc) (estimated)
- Apparent size (V): 1.7′ × 1.6′

Other designations
- UGC 06852, MCG +04-28-082, PGC 037224

NGC 3940 is an elliptical galaxy, located 300 million light-years away in the constellation Leo. It was discovered on April 26, 1785, by astronomer William Herschel. NGC 3940 is a member of the NGC 3937 Group.

NGC 3940 has a supermassive black hole with an estimated mass of 5 × 10^{8} M_{☉}.

== See also ==
- NGC 3937
