= NGC 3929 =

Galaxy in the constellation Leo

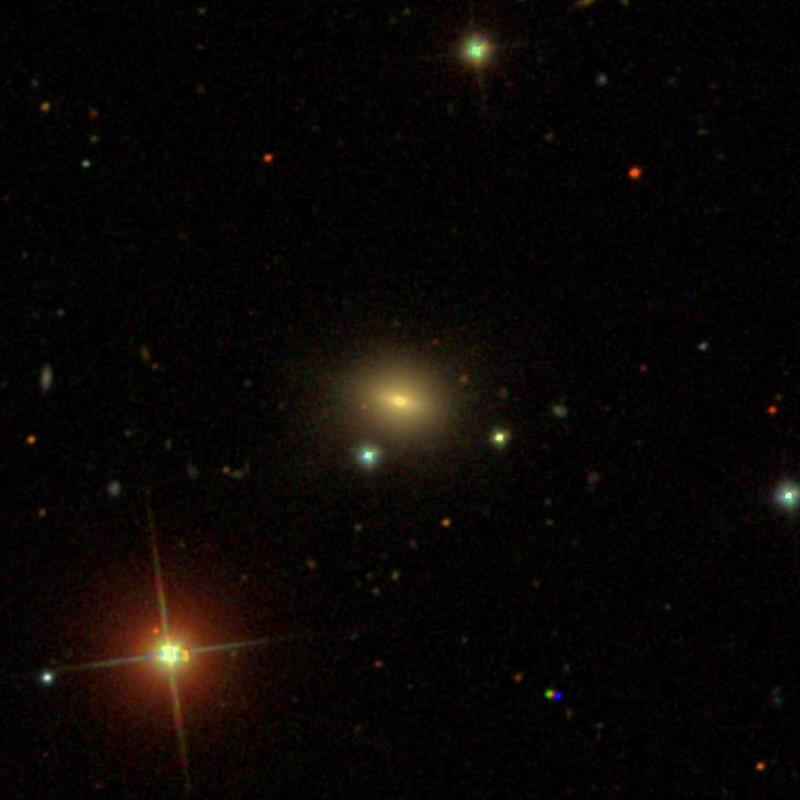
- SDSS image of NGC 3929

Observation data (J2000 epoch)
- Constellation: Leo
- Right ascension: 11^{h} 51^{m} 42.5^{s}
- Declination: 21° 00′ 10″
- Redshift: 0.023510
- Heliocentric radial velocity: 7048 km/s
- Distance: 330 Mly (100 Mpc)
- Group or cluster: NGC 3937 Group
- Apparent magnitude (V): 14.7
- Absolute magnitude (B): -22.20

Characteristics
- Type: E-S0
- Size: ~99,900 ly (30.63 kpc) (estimated)
- Apparent size (V): 0.76′ × 0.53′

Other designations
- UGC 06832, MCG +04-28-076, PGC 037126

NGC 3929 is an elliptical or a lenticular galaxy located 330 million light-years away in the constellation Leo. It was discovered on December 4, 1861, by astronomer Heinrich d'Arrest. NGC 3929 is a member of the NGC 3937 Group.

NGC 3929 has a supermassive black hole with an estimated mass of 5.5 × 10^{8} M_{☉}.

== See also ==
- NGC 3937
