= NGC 3860 =

Spiral galaxy in the constellation Leo

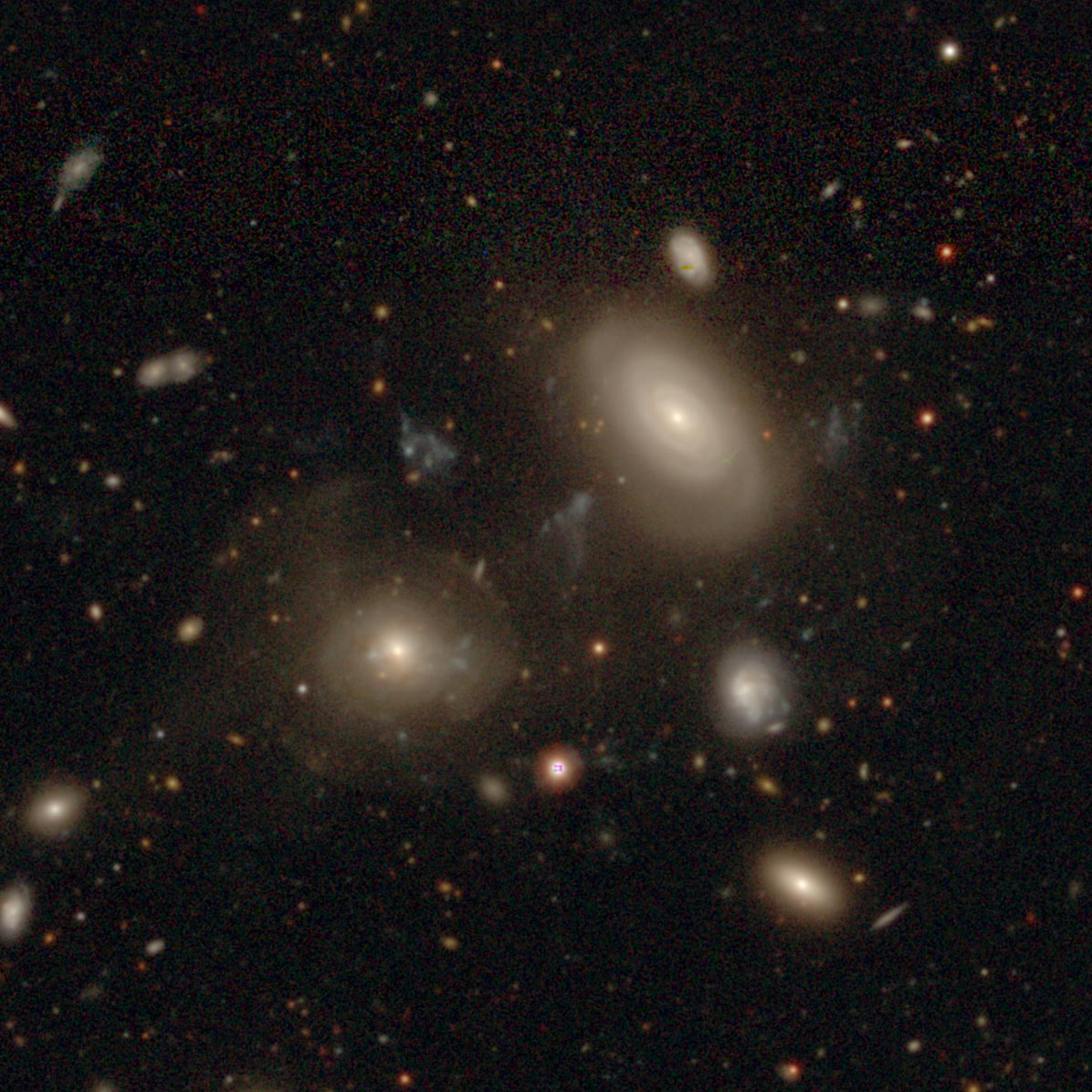
- legacy surveys image of NGC 3860 (upper right) and CGCG 097-125 (lower left).

Observation data (J2000 epoch)
- Constellation: Leo
- Right ascension: 11^{h} 44^{m} 49.1835^{s}
- Declination: +19° 47′ 42.155″
- Redshift: 0.018720
- Heliocentric radial velocity: 5612 ± 2 km/s
- Distance: 338.39 ± 2.45 Mly (103.750 ± 0.750 Mpc)
- Group or cluster: Leo Cluster
- Apparent magnitude (V): 14.22

Characteristics
- Type: Sa
- Mass: ~3.7×10^{11} M_{☉}
- Size: ~135,900 ly (41.66 kpc) (estimated)
- Apparent size (V): 1.0′ × 0.5′

Other designations
- HOLM 285A, IRAS 11422+2003, UGC 6718, MCG +03-30-088, PGC 36577, CGCG 097-120

NGC 3860 is a spiral galaxy located about 340 million light-years away in the constellation Leo. NGC 3860 was discovered by astronomer William Herschel on April 27, 1785. The galaxy is a member of the Leo Cluster and is a low-luminosity AGN (LLAGN). Gavazzi et al. however classified NGC 3860 as a strong AGN which may have been triggered by a supermassive black hole in the center of the galaxy.

== H I deficiency ==
Observations of NGC 3860 show that the galaxy has lost approximately 90% of its original hydrogen content. This indicates that NGC 3860 has crossed though the core of the Leo Cluster and that ram pressure exerted by the dense intergalactic medium in the cluster stripped most of the neutral atomic hydrogen from the galaxy.

The gas disk of NGC 3860 is truncated, which is an additional indicator that the galaxy is undergoing ram pressure stripping as it falls into the Leo Cluster.

== See also ==
- List of NGC objects (3001–4000)
- NGC 4522
