= Leo Cluster =

Galaxy cluster in the constellation of Leo

- legacy surveys image of the center of the Leo Cluster

Observation data (Epoch J2000)
- Constellation: Leo
- Right ascension: 11^{h} 44^{m} 36.5^{s}
- Declination: 19° 45′ 32″
- Brightest member: NGC 3842
- Number of galaxies: ~100
- Richness class: 2
- Bautz–Morgan classification: II-III
- Redshift: 0.022 (6 595 km/s)
- Distance: 113 Mpc (368.6 Mly) for h^{−1}_{0.705}
- X-ray flux: (81.40 ± 6.0%)×10^{−12} erg s^{−1} cm^{−2} (0.1–2.4 keV)

Other designations
- Abell 1367

The Leo Cluster (Abell 1367) is a galaxy cluster about 330 million light-years distant (z = 0.022) in the constellation Leo, with at least 70 major galaxies. The galaxy known as NGC 3842 is the brightest member of this cluster. Along with the Coma Cluster, it is one of the two major clusters comprising the Coma Supercluster, which in turn is part of the CfA2 Great Wall, which is hundreds of millions light years long and is one of the largest known structures in the universe.

A team of scientists decided to observe the Leo Cluster with the intention of creating a catalog of extended ionized gas (EIG) clouds. This data also led to the discovery of many star-forming parents (galaxies) within the cluster. These star-forming galaxies turned out to be very similar to those found in the neighboring Coma cluster. The EIGs in the Leo Cluster are longer in the Leo Cluster than the Coma Cluster. This likely means that the Leo Cluster and its stars are probably younger than most comparable clusters in the universe and evolve at a different pace.

Most dense galaxy clusters are composed mostly of elliptical galaxies. The Leo Cluster, however, mostly contains spiral galaxies, suggesting that it is much younger than other comparable clusters, such as the Coma Cluster. It is also home to one of the universe's largest known black holes, which lies in the center of NGC 3842. The black hole is 9.7 billion times more massive than the Sun.

It can be very difficult for stars to form within the Leo Cluster. This is because infalling galaxies have a tendency to strip gas away from other stars that are attempting to form. This has led to the creation of a "hot zone" where stars are unable to maintain their gas long enough to properly form.

There appears to be a number of subpopulations within the Leo Cluster. The first consists of elliptical galaxies that seem to be roughly as old as the universe. The second subpopulation contains red-sequence lenticular (lens shaped) galaxies whose ages are directly tied to their mass. The third and final subpopulation is of galaxies where star formation is still taking place, and are morphologically distributed.

== Gallery ==
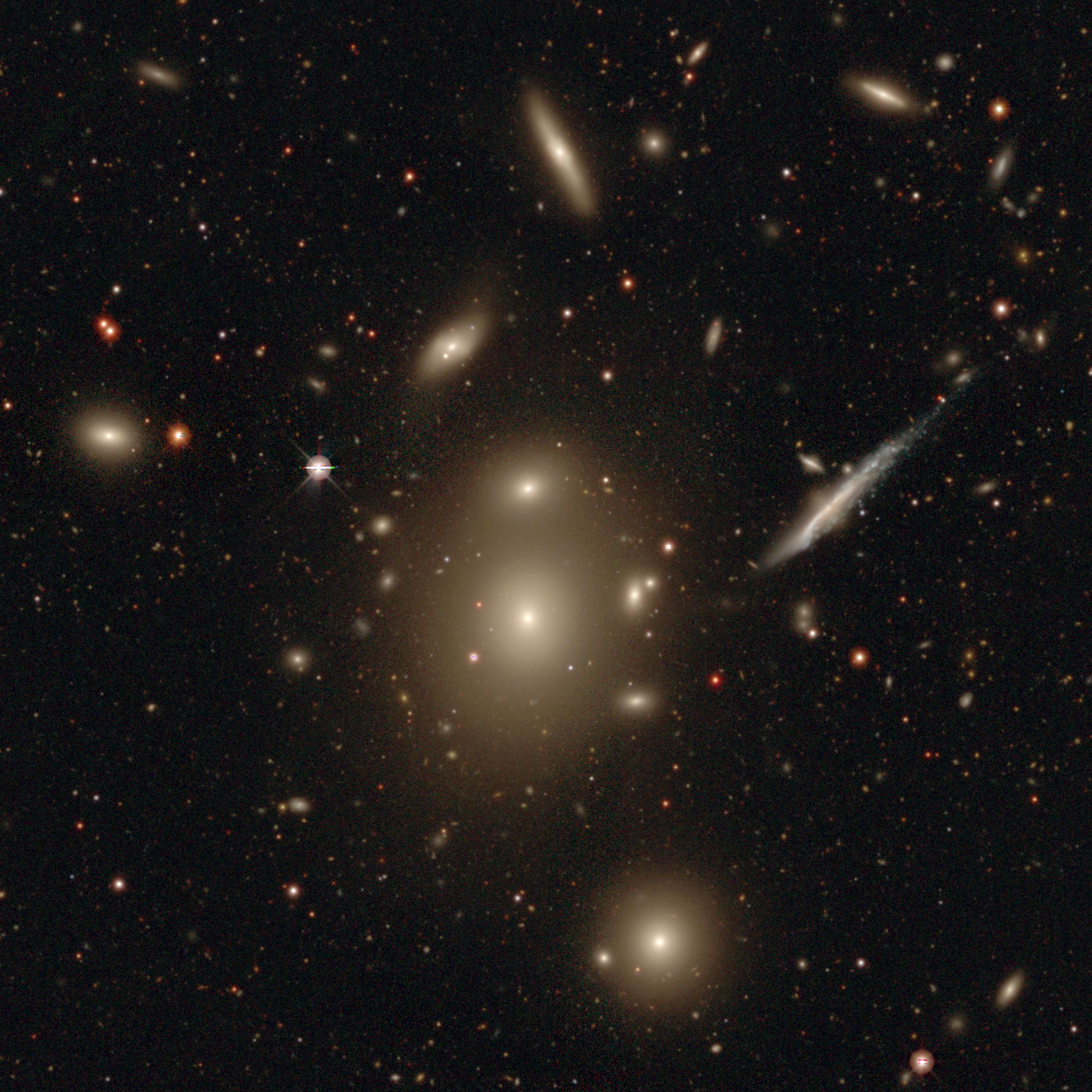
Legacy surveys image of the brightest galaxy in the Leo Cluster (NGC 3842 center), as well as surrounding galaxies

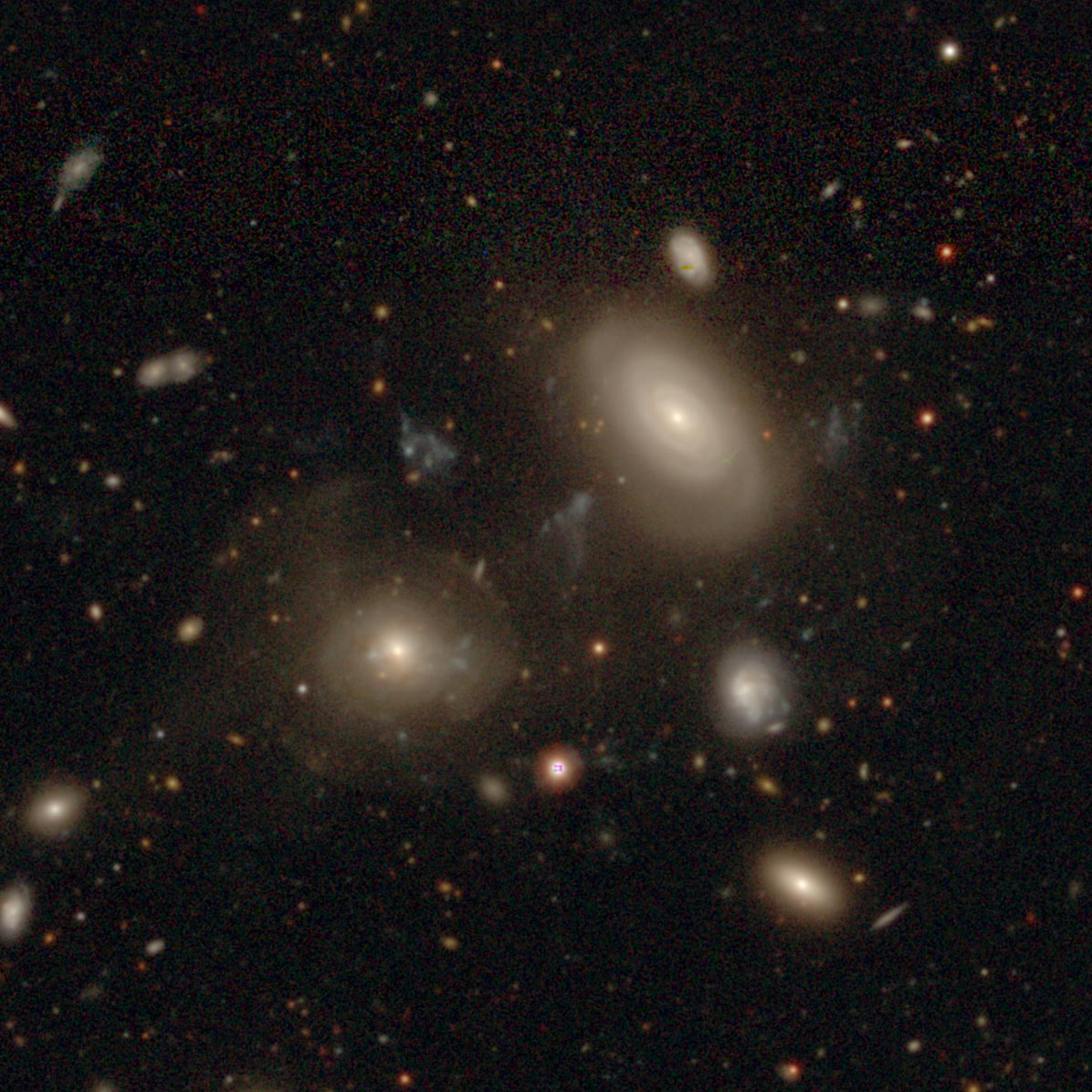
The NGC 3860 + NGC 3860B pair in the Leo Cluster

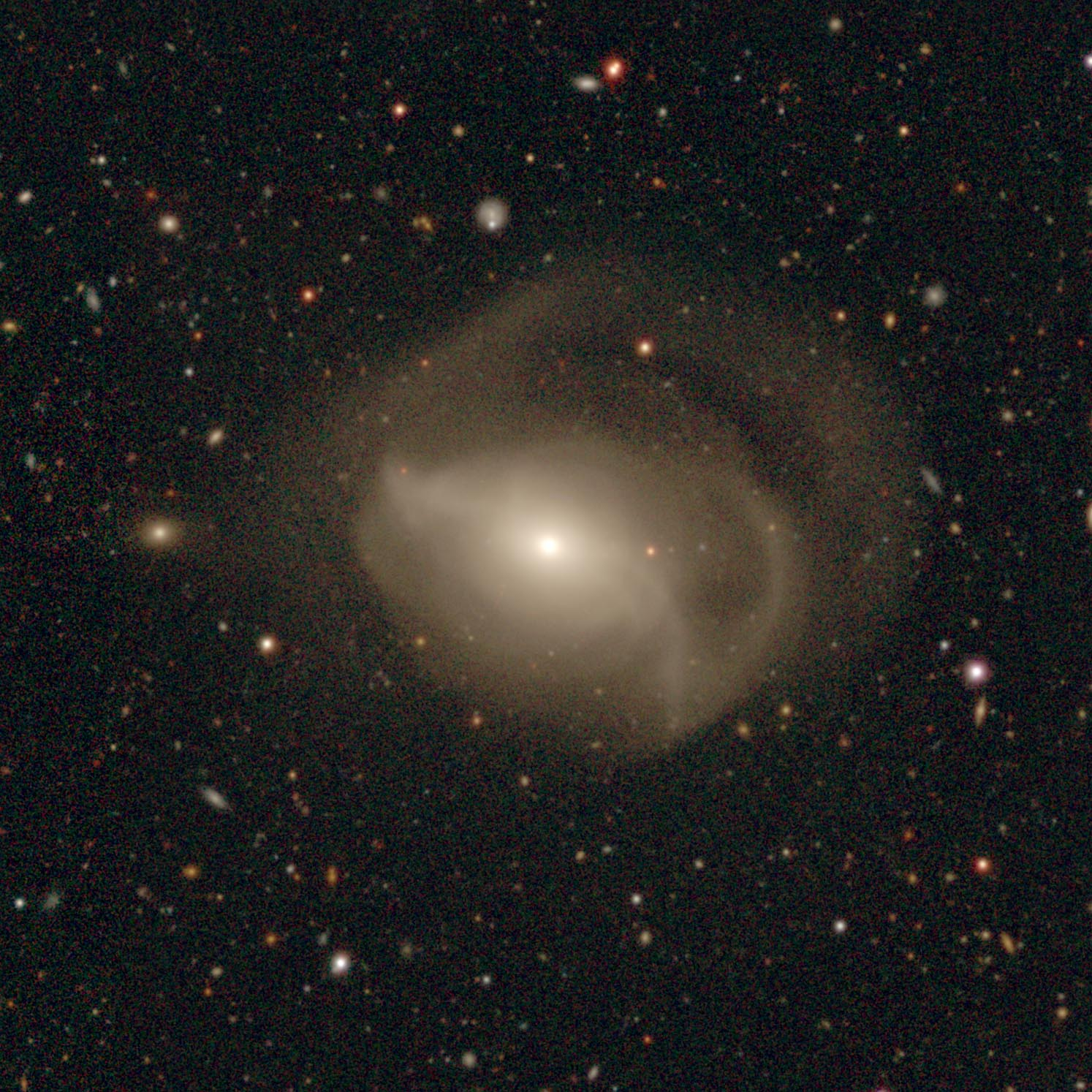
NGC 3816, which is located in the outskirts of the Leo Cluster

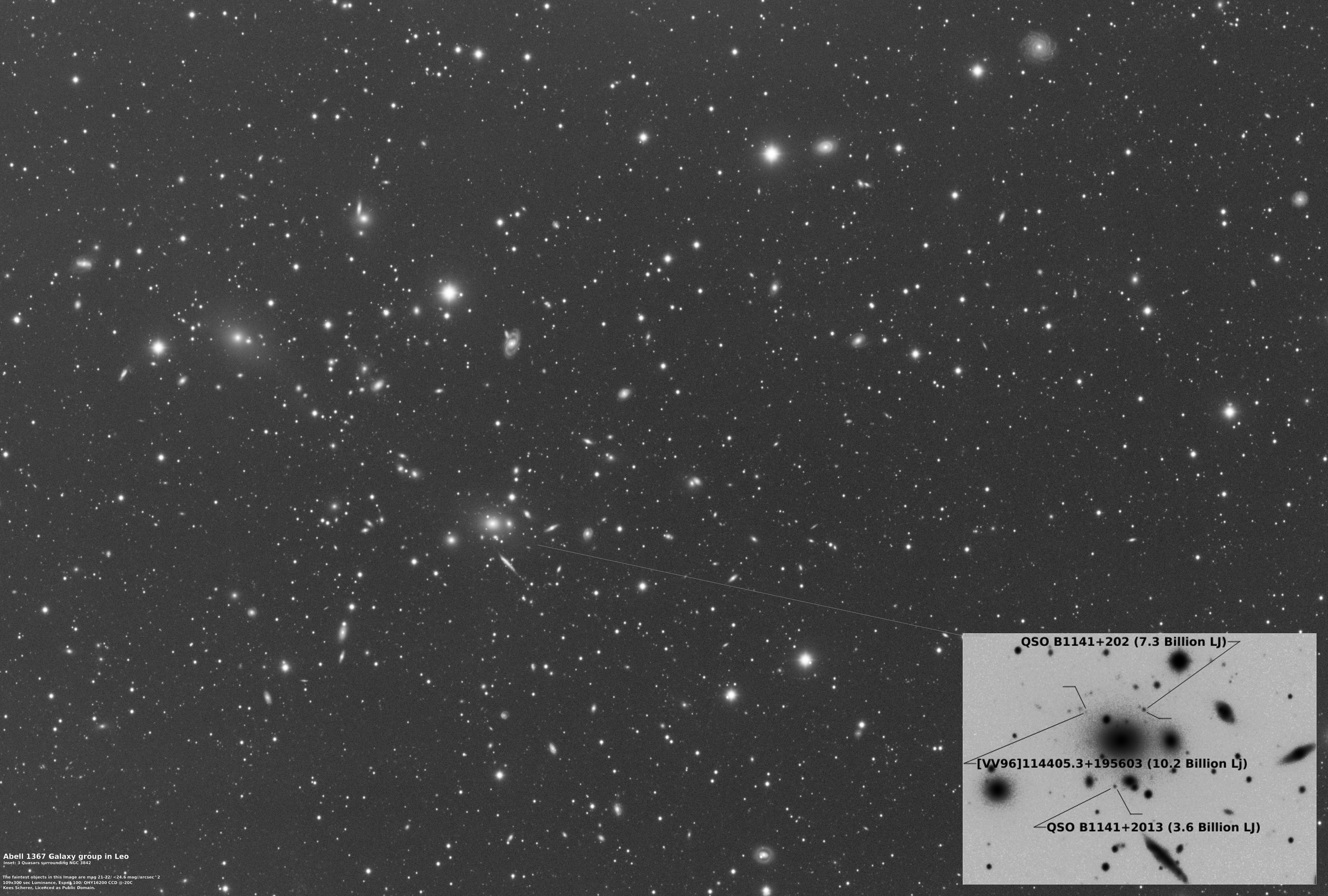
Amateur image of the Leo Cluster

== See also ==
- Abell catalogue
- List of Abell clusters
