= NGC 3081 =

Galaxy in the constellation Hydra

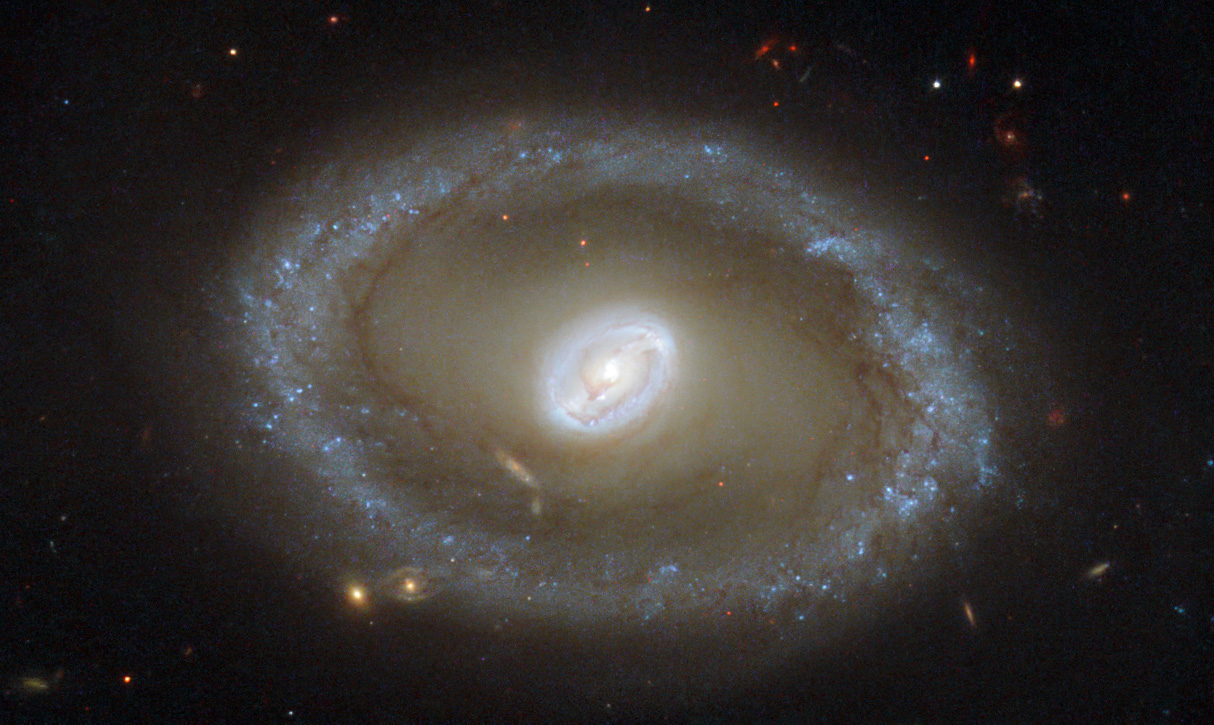
- NGC 3081 by Hubble Space Telescope

Observation data (J2000 epoch)
- Constellation: Hydra
- Right ascension: 09^{h} 59^{m} 29.5^{s}
- Declination: −22° 49′ 35″
- Redshift: 0.007976 ± 0.000010
- Heliocentric radial velocity: 2,391 ± 3 km/s
- Distance: 83 Mly (25.3 Mpc)
- Apparent magnitude (V): 13.5

Characteristics
- Type: (R_1)SAB(r)0/a
- Apparent size (V): 2.1′ × 1.6′
- Notable features: Seyfert galaxy

Other designations
- IC 2529, ESO 499-G31, AM 0957-223, MCG -04-24-012, PGC 28876

NGC 3081 is a barred lenticular ring galaxy in the constellation of Hydra. NGC 3081 is located about 85 million light-years away from Earth, which means, given its apparent dimensions, that NGC 3081 is approximately 60,000 light-years across. It is a type II Seyfert galaxy, characterised by its bright nucleus. It was discovered by William Herschel on 21 December 1786.

NGC 3081 is seen nearly face-on. The galaxy's barred spiral centre is surrounded by a bright loop known as a resonance ring. This ring is full of bright clusters and bursts of new star formation, and frames the supermassive black hole thought to be lurking within NGC 3081—which glows brightly as it gobbles up infalling material.

== Characteristics ==
=== Active galactic nucleus ===
NGC 3081 is known to feature an active galaxy nucleus which leads to being categorised as a type II Seyfert galaxy. Even though NGC 3081 shows significant absorption, it is Compton thin. Also it does not show spectral variability on monthly timescales in X-rays. In the nucleus of the galaxy is thought to exist a supermassive black hole whose mass upper limit is estimated to be between 8.5 and 37 million M_{☉}, based on the intrinsic velocity dispersion as measured by the Hubble Space Telescope.

Observations obtained with the GMOS integral field spectrograph on the Gemini North telescope show a gas flow is present in the inner ≈ 2 arcseconds (200 parsecs) of the galaxy, whose appearance is consistent with a bipolar outflow oriented along the north–south direction. Its outflow rate in ionized gas is estimated to be between 1.9 ×10^{−3}M_{☉}/year and 6.9 ×10^{−3} M_{☉}/year. There was also observed residual gas motion which is interpreted as gas following non-circular orbits in the barred potential, which may lead to gas inflow up to 1.3 ×10^{−2} M_{☉}/year.

=== Resonance rings ===
NGC 3081 features four well defined rings; a misaligned nuclear ring with angular radius 14", an aligned inner ring with angular radius 35", an outer ring with radius 90", and an outer pseudoring with radius 105". Each ring is a well-defined zone of active star formation, while little or no star formation is observed between the rings. The rings lie at periodic orbits, known as resonances, certain positions where gravitational effects throughout the galaxy cause gas to pile up and accumulate in. These can be caused by the presence of a bar within the galaxy, as with NGC 3081, or by interactions with other nearby objects. It is not unusual for rings like this to be seen in barred galaxies, as the bars are very effective at gathering gas into these resonance regions, causing pile-ups which lead to active and very well-organised star formation. As external interactions could prevent the material from becoming sufficiently well organized in rings to trace the orbits so clearly, it is believed that NGC 3081 evolved in a relatively undisturbed manner.

Within the nuclear ring has been obseverd a spiral structure with two arms. Some parts of the nuclear ring and discrete knots in the arms feature higher numbers of younger stars than the rest of the nuclear ring interior, which suggests that they are sites of recent or ongoing star formation. They also feature emission indicative of HII regions. The inner ring, which is intrinsically elongated, features a gas cloud formed by the perturbation of a rotating bar at the location where the ring crosses the bar major axis, resulting in star formation.

The outer ring features a dimpling near the bar axis, being aligned nearly perpendicular to it. The pseudoring is formed by two faint spiral arms beyond the outer ring that nearly close into another ring. The presence of both an outer ring and a pseudoring is rarely seen in barred galaxies.

=== Bars ===
The galaxy features a complex double-barred structure as seen in optical and infrared wavelengths. The primary bar is weak and it is located within the inner ring. The secondary bar lies within the nuclear ring and is misaligned with the primary bar by 71 degrees. The secondary bar is also surrounded by a lens extending to the radius of the nuclear ring. In the residual image created by Laurikainen et al. the secondary bar shows an ansae-type morphology.

== Nearby galaxies ==
NGC 3081 is an isolated galaxy. It is located within the same cloud of galaxies with NGC 3223, NGC 3001, NGC 3078, NGC 3089, NGC 3100, NGC 3275, NGC 3281, NGC 3347 and NGC 3449.

== See also ==
- NGC 6782 – another multiringed galaxy
