= IC 2560 =

Spiral galaxy in the constellation Antlia

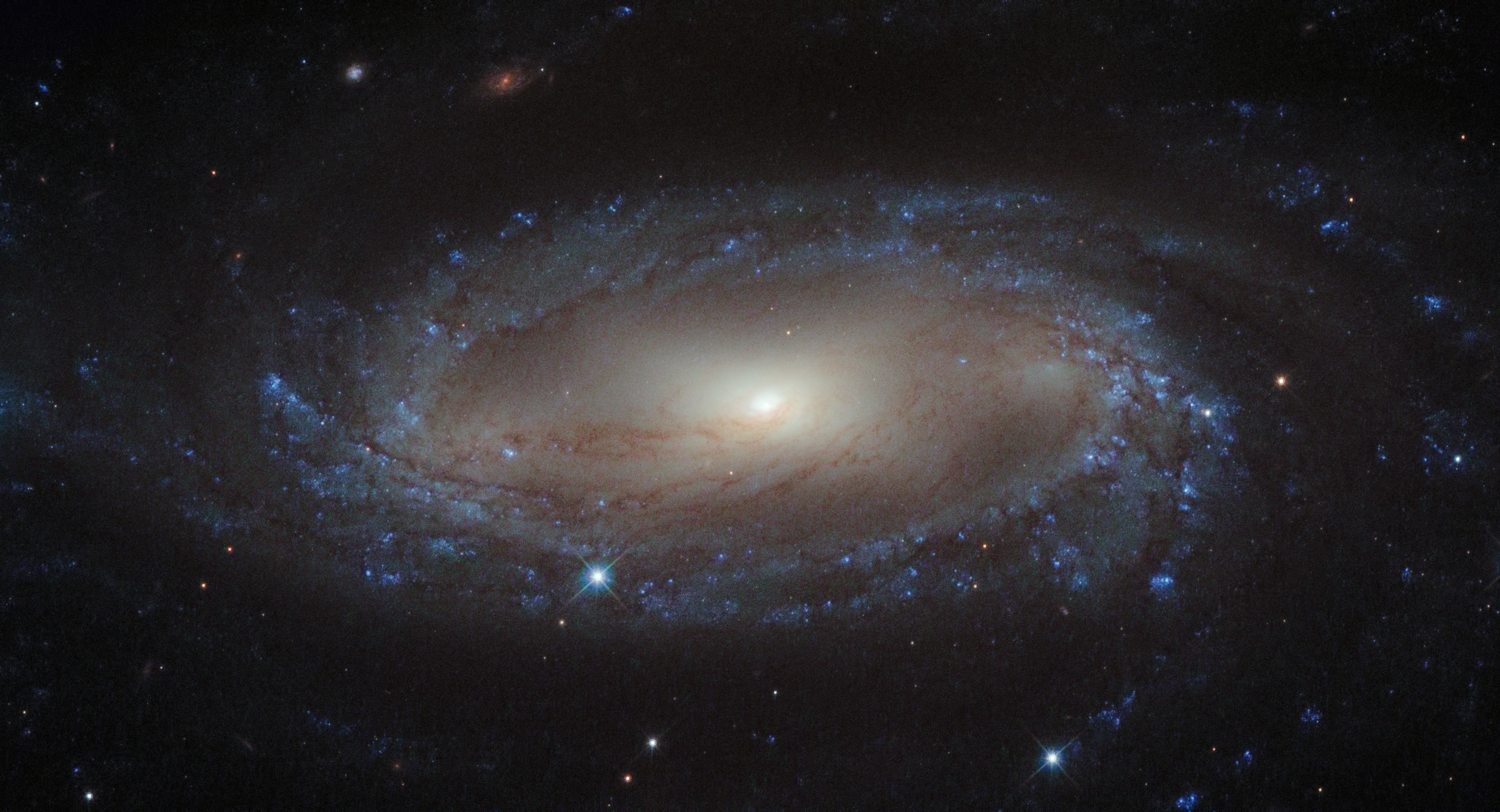
- IC 2560's spiral arms and barred structure imaged by the Hubble Space Telescope

Observation data (J2000 epoch)
- Constellation: Antlia
- Right ascension: 10^{h} 16^{m} 18.666^{s}
- Declination: −33° 33′ 49.85″
- Redshift: 0.0096
- Heliocentric radial velocity: 2864 km/s
- Distance: 110 million ly
- Apparent magnitude (V): 13.31
- Apparent magnitude (B): 12.53

Characteristics
- Type: (R')SB(r)b?
- Size: ~149,000 ly (45.69 kpc) (estimated)
- Apparent size (V): 3.2′ × 2.0′

Other designations
- ESO 375- G 004, IRAS 10140-3318, 2MASX J10161866-3333498, MCG -05-25-001, PGC 29993

IC 2560 is a spiral galaxy lying over 110 million light-years away from Earth in the constellation of Antlia. It was discovered by Lewis Swift on 28 December 1897.

The luminosity class of IC 2560 is II with a broad HI line containing regions of ionized hydrogen. Moreover, IC 2560 is an active Type 2 Seyfert Galaxy. It has a distinct bar structure in the center with the supermassive black hole at the core having a mass of 4.4+4.4
−2.2×10^{6} M_{☉}.

One supernova has been observed in IC 2560. SN 2020ejm (Type Ia, mag. 16) was discovered by the Distance Less Than 40 Mpc Survey (DLT40) on 11 March 2020.

== NGC 3223 group ==
IC 2560 is a member of the NGC 3223 Group. There are 15 other galaxies in the group including NGC 3223, NGC 3224, NGC 3258, NGC 3268, NGC 3289, IC 2552 and IC 2559. Together, the group is part of the Antlia Cluster.
