= NGC 3223 =

Faint spiral galaxy in the constellation Antlia

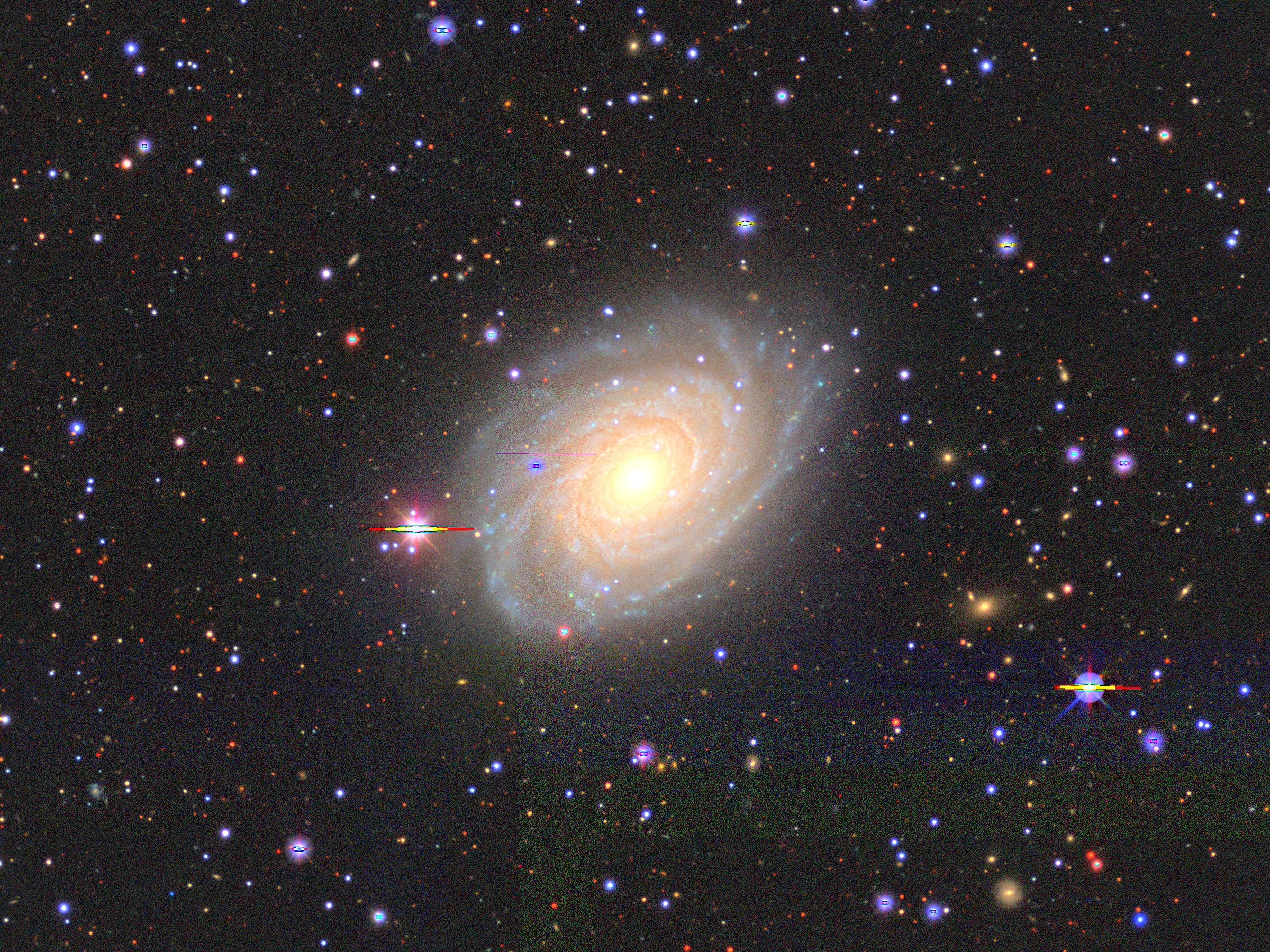
- NGC 3223 imaged by Legacy Surveys

Observation data (J2000 epoch)
- Constellation: Antlia
- Right ascension: 10^{h} 21^{m} 35.076^{s}
- Declination: −34° 16′ 00.44″
- Redshift: 0.009704
- Heliocentric radial velocity: 2,896 km/s
- Distance: 109.5 Mly (33.57 Mpc)
- Apparent magnitude (V): 10.82
- Apparent magnitude (B): 11.82

Characteristics
- Type: SA(s)b, Sb(s)I-II

Other designations
- IC 2571, MCG -06-23-023, PGC 30308

NGC 3223 is a faint spiral galaxy in the constellation Antlia. It was discovered on February 2, 1835 by the English astronomer John Herschel. The galaxy lies at a distance of approximately 110 million light years away and is receding with a heliocentric radial velocity of 2,896 km/s.

== Morphology ==
The morphological class of NGC 3223 is SA(s)b, indicating it is a spiral with no central bar (SA), no inner ring feature, and moderately tightly wound spiral arms. The galactic plane is inclined at an angle of 46° to the line of sight from the Earth, with the major axis along a position angle of 128°. It has at least two well-defined arms and is flocculent in appearance.

== NGC 3223 group ==
NGC 3223 is the brightest and largest member of a galaxy group named after it. There are 16 members including NGC 3224, NGC 3258, NGC 3268, NGC 3289, IC 2552, IC 2559 and IC 2560. Together, the NGC 3223 Group forms a part of the Antlia Cluster.
