= NGC 2273 =

Galaxy in the constellation Lynx

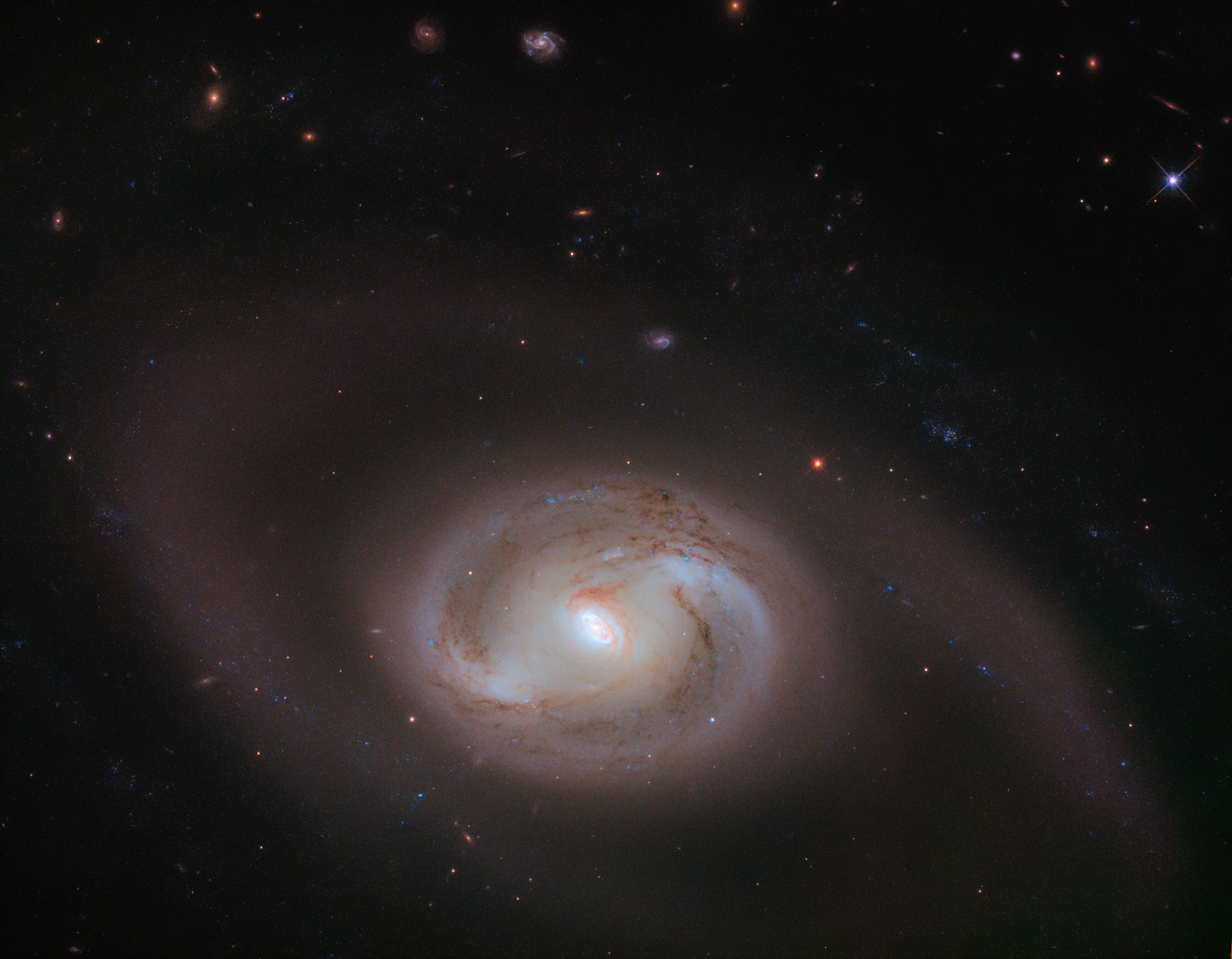
- NGC 2273 by Hubble Space Telescope

Observation data (J2000 epoch)
- Constellation: Lynx
- Right ascension: 06^{h} 50^{m} 08.7^{s}
- Declination: +60° 50′ 45″
- Redshift: 0.006138 ± 0.000013
- Heliocentric radial velocity: 1,840 ± 4 km/s
- Distance: 94.5 ± 13 Mly (29.0 ± 4.0 Mpc)
- Apparent magnitude (V): 11.6

Characteristics
- Type: SB(r)a
- Apparent size (V): 3.2′ × 2.5′
- Notable features: Seyfert galaxy

Other designations
- UGC 3546, MCG +10-10-015, PGC 19688, CGCG 285-006, Mrk 620

NGC 2273 is a barred spiral galaxy located in the constellation Lynx. It is located at a distance of about 95 million light years from Earth, which, given its apparent dimensions, means that NGC 2273 is about 100,000 light years across. It was discovered by Nils Dunér on September 15, 1867.

== Characteristics ==
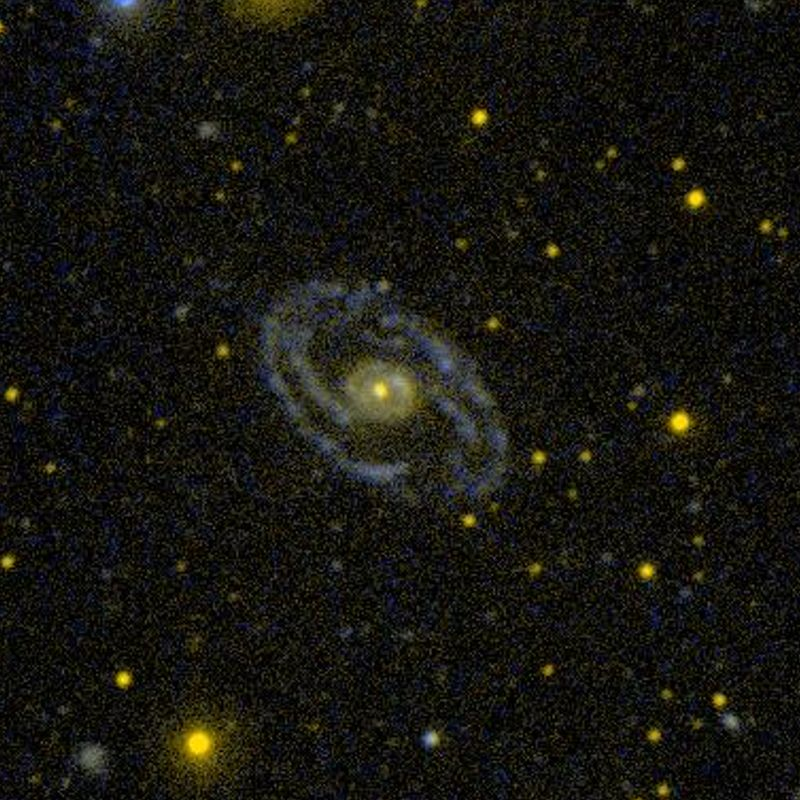
NGC 2273 by GALEX.

NGC 2273 has a multiring structure. The galaxy has an inner ring and two outer pseudorings formed by two sets of spiral arms. The galaxy is seen with an inclination of 41 degrees. The galaxy hosts about 1.1×10^{9} M_{☉} of hydrogen gas (HI), with most of it lying at the outer pseudoring. The galaxy also hosts large amounts of molecular gas, as indicated by the CO lines, which is regarded as an indicator of active star formation. The total infrared luminosity of the galaxy is 10^{10.25} L_{☉}. The galaxy has a bar whose radius is 40 arcseconds.

Observations of the central 20 arcseconds of the galaxy by the Hubble Space Telescope showed spiral arms that corresponded to the inner ring. The central ovoid of the galaxy was found to feature a bar-like structure and two arc structures that form a partial nuclear ring. Its emission is associated with the presence of HII regions. Around the nucleus lies a dusty ring-like structure, with a radius of 7 arcseconds, better seen at its northwest part. Another dusty ring is observed with 20 arcseconds radius.

=== Nucleus ===
Based on the emission lines that are present in its spectrum, the nucleus of NGC 2273 has been characterised as active and it has been categorised as a type II Seyfert galaxy. Also, a water kilomaser has been detected in the nuclear region of the galaxy. It could be created either by the active nucleus or by a prominent site of star formation.

Observations by BeppoSAX, XMM Newton, and Chandra X-Ray Observatory suggested that the nucleus of NGC 2273 is obscured by a Compton thick column, with high column density, estimated to be 1.1×10^{24} cm^{−2} as measured by ASCA, or 1.5×10^{24} cm^{−2} as measured by Suzaku. The harder X-Rays manage to get through and are dominated by reflection from cold material, as the Fe-K line indicates. The spectrography of the nuclear regions is weakly polarised, more prominent in H-alpha. The broad X-ray spectrum of NGC 2273 has been found to be composed of a thermal or scattered soft component, a reflected component, and an absorbed power law component. The 2–10 keV X-ray flux of the galaxy is estimated to be 1.7×10^{42} ergs^{−1}.

The nucleus also emits radiowaves. The radio source has been found to be linear and is composed of two unequal radio features separated by about 170 parsecs. These two radio features have been identified as radio jets. A linear jet-like feature extending for 2 arcseconds east of the nucleus was observed in [O III] λ5007 images. It is aligned with the radio jets and is possibly of nuclear origin.

The most accepted theory for the energy source of active galactic nuclei is the presence of an accretion disk around a supermassive black hole. The mass of the black hole in the centre of NGC 2273 is estimated to be between (7.5±0.4)×10^{6} M_{☉} based on kinematics of the water maser circumnuclear disk. The disk appears warped.

== Nearby galaxies ==
NGC 2273 is the brightest galaxy in a galaxy group known as the NGC 2273 group (or known as LGG 137). Other members of the group include the galaxies NGC 2237B and UGC 3504. NGC 2237B lies 40 arcminutes to the south.

The NGC 2273 Group is part of a galaxy cloud known as the Lynx Cloud, which is part of the Virgo Supercluster.

== See also ==
- NGC 1386 - a similar Seyfert galaxy
- NGC 3081 - a similar multiring Seyfert galaxy
