= NGC 2775 =

Galaxy in the constellation Cancer

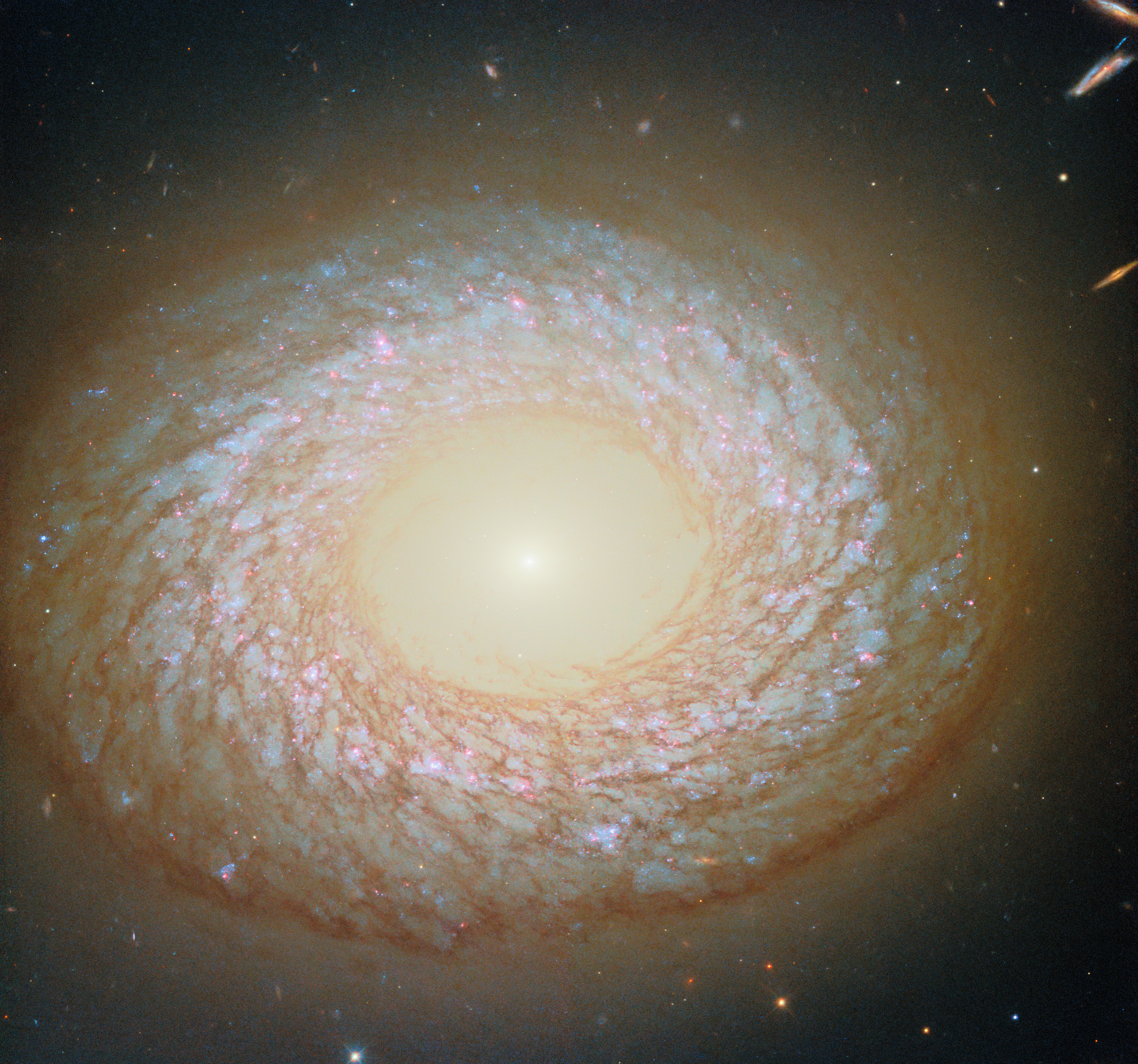
- NGC 2775 imaged by the Hubble Space Telescope

Observation data (J2000 epoch)
- Constellation: Cancer
- Right ascension: 09^{h} 10^{m} 20.112^{s}
- Declination: +07° 02′ 16.53″
- Redshift: 0.004500±0.00000334
- Heliocentric radial velocity: 1,316.4±13.4 km/s
- Distance: 67 Mly (20.5 Mpc)
- Apparent magnitude (V): 10.4

Characteristics
- Type: SAa or SA(r)ab
- Size: ~79,000 ly (24.23 kpc) (estimated)
- Apparent size (V): 4.3′ × 3.3′

Other designations
- IRAS 09076+0714, UGC 4820, MCG +01-24-005, PGC 25861, CGCG 034-006, C 48

NGC 2775, also known as Caldwell 48, is a spiral galaxy in the constellation Cancer. It is 67 million light-years (20.5 megaparsecs) away from the Milky Way. It was discovered by German-British astronomer William Herschel on 19 December 1783.

This object has a morphological classification of SA(r)ab, which indicates an unbarred spiral galaxy (SA) with a prominent ring structure (r) and flocculent, tightly wound spiral arms (ab). The galaxy is inclined by an angle of 44° to the line of sight from the Earth. The galactic nucleus is not active and the large nuclear bulge, which extends out to an angular radius of 0.4′, is relatively gas free. An explanation for the latter could be a high supernova rate. Although star formation is taking place in the dusty outer ring, NGC 2775 does not display any current starburst activity, and the galactic nucleus is virtually free of any star formation whatsoever.

The galaxy's hydrogen tail feature indicates a past interaction with a faint companion. A satellite galaxy appears to have orbited NGC 2775 multiple times, losing mass as it did so and creating faint, shell-like structures. Nearby irregular galaxy NGC 2777 displays a tidal tail of hydrogen gas that points back to NGC 2775, suggesting the two may be linked.

== Cluster and group membership ==
NGC 2775 belongs to the Antlia-Hydra Cluster of galaxies and is the most prominent member of the NGC 2775 Group (also known as LGG 169), a small galaxy group in the Virgo Super-cluster, along with the Local Group. Other members of the NGC 2775 Group include NGC 2777 and UGC 4781.

== Supernova ==
One supernova has been observed in NGC 2775. SN 1993Z (Type Ia, mag. 13.9) was discovered by the Leuschner Observatory Supernova Search (LOSS) on 23 September 1993. By September 25, spectral analysis showed that it had peaked about four weeks earlier.

== Gallery ==
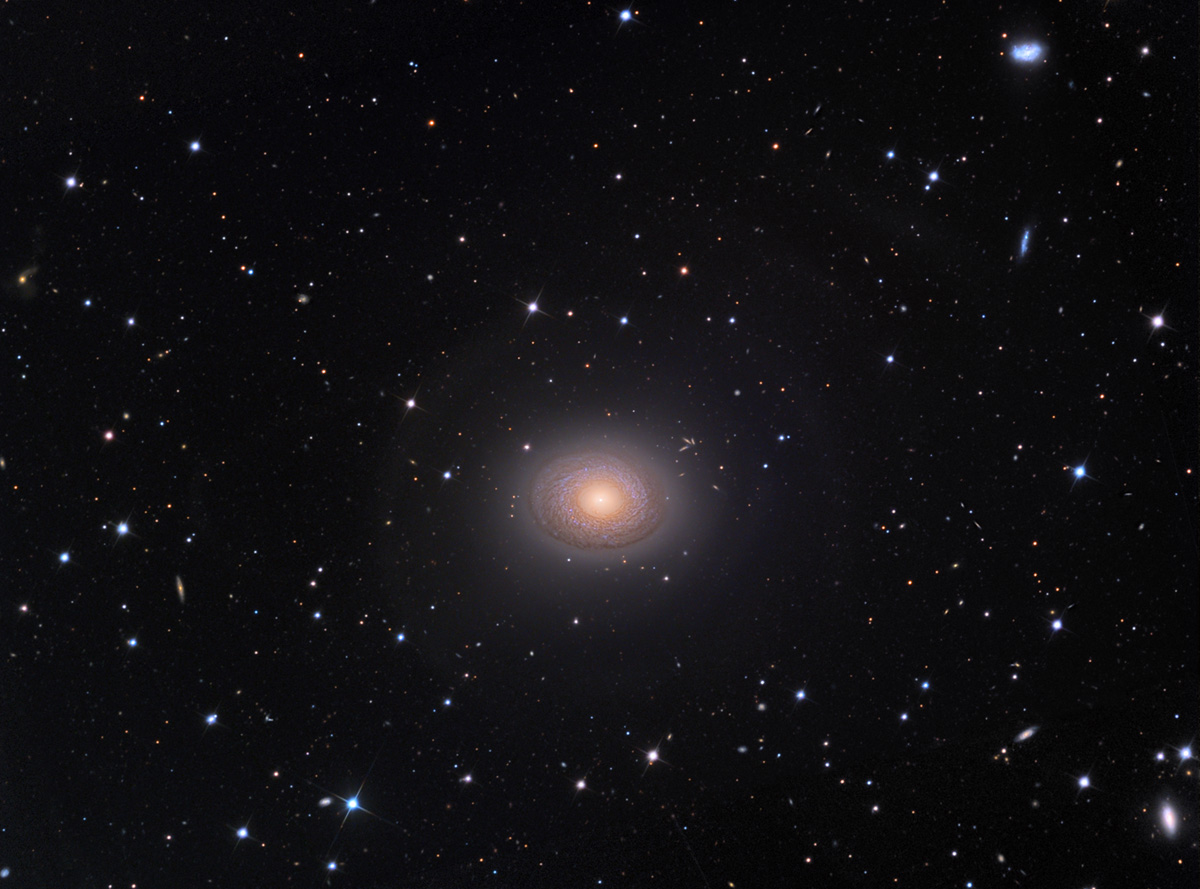
NGC 2775 imaged with a 32-inch telescope.

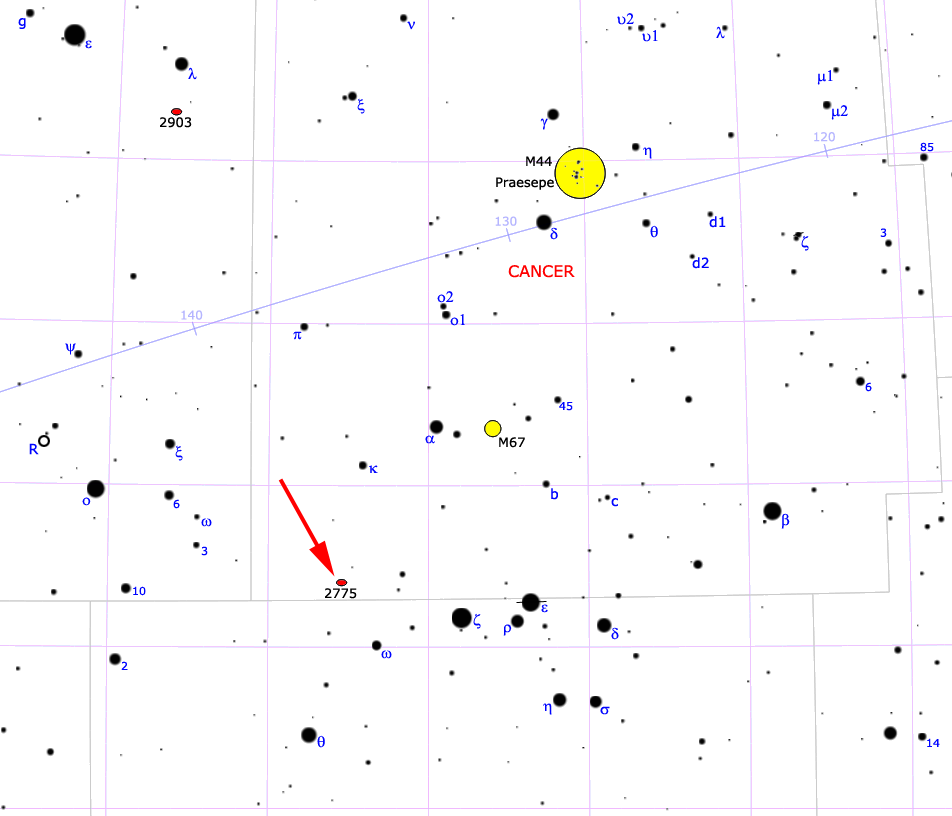
Map showing the location of NGC 2775.

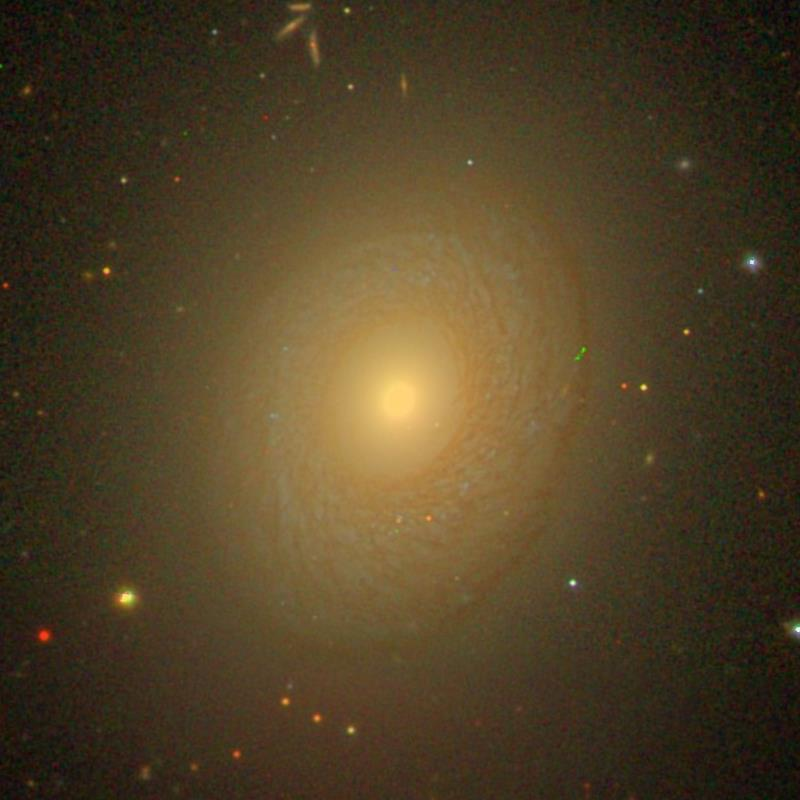
NGC 2775 (SDSS DR14)

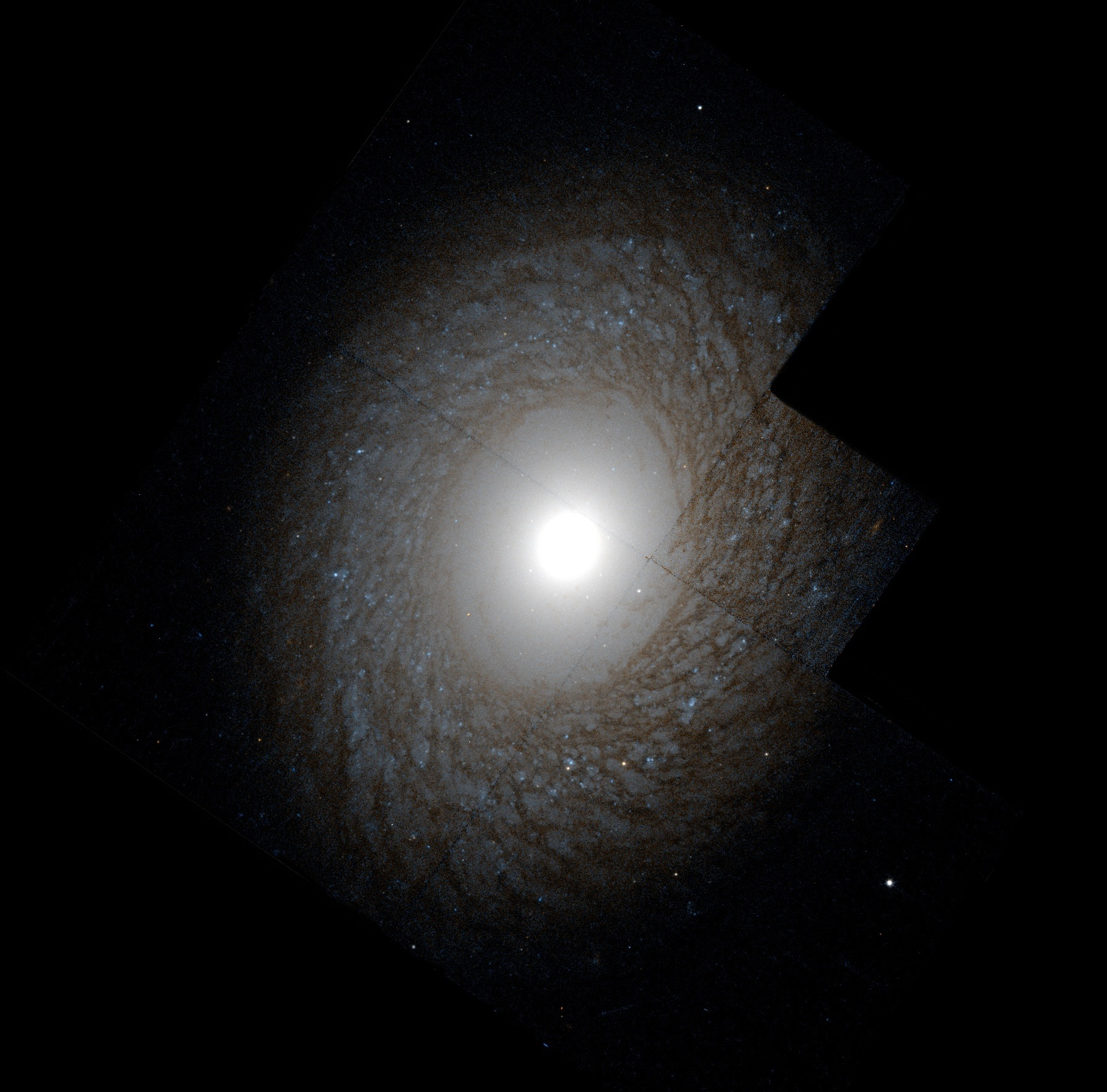
NGC 2775 from the Hubble Space Telescope

== See also ==
- List of NGC objects (2001–3000)
