= NGC 3269 =

Galaxy in the constellation Antlia

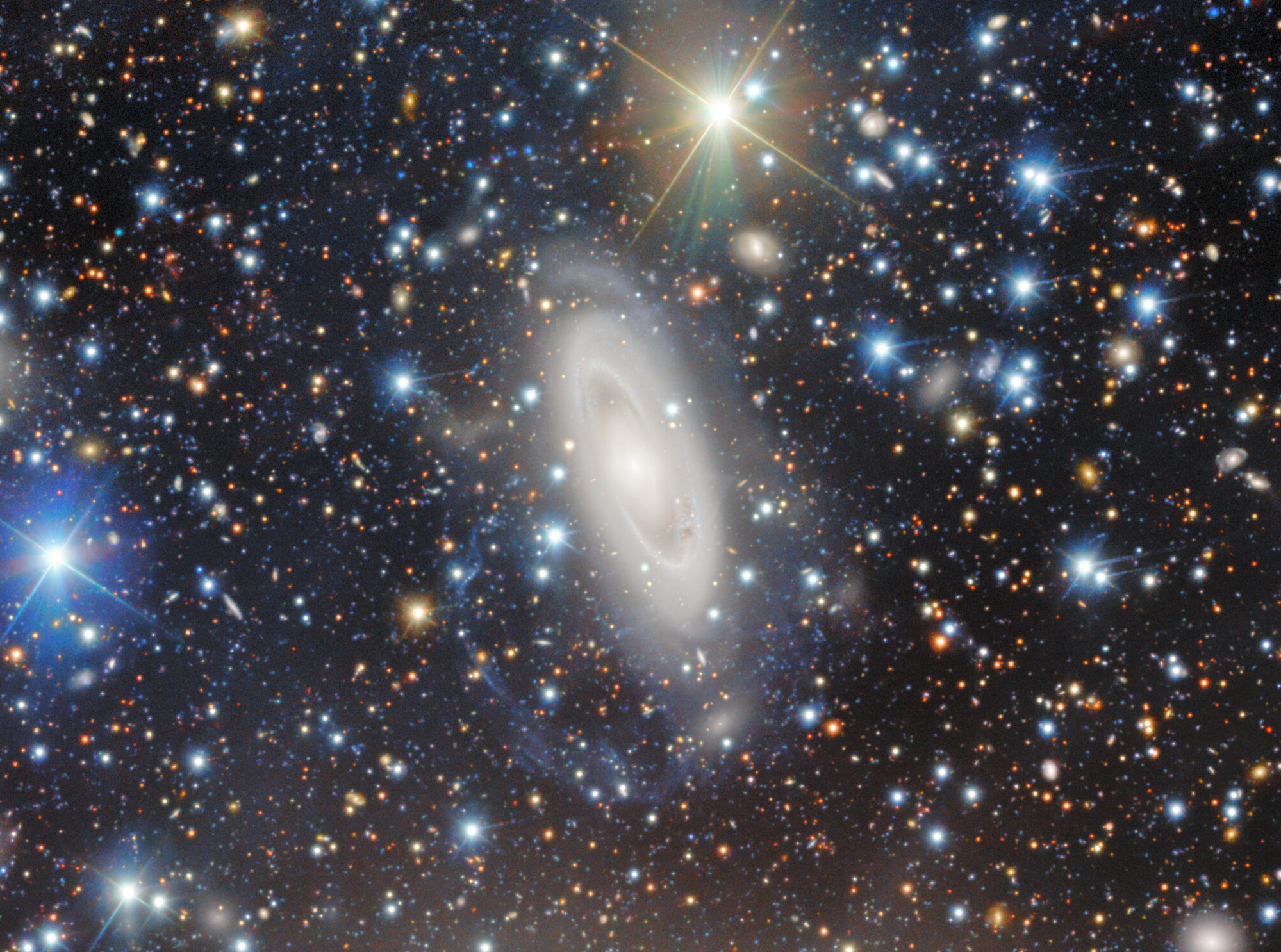
- NGC 3269 imaged by the Víctor M. Blanco Telescope

Observation data (J2000 epoch)
- Constellation: Antlia
- Right ascension: 10^{h} 29^{m} 57.0404^{s}
- Declination: −35° 13′ 27.833″
- Redshift: 0.012522
- Heliocentric radial velocity: 3,754±33 km/s
- Distance: 103 Mly (31.7 Mpc)
- Apparent magnitude (V): 12.26
- Apparent magnitude (B): 13.22

Characteristics
- Type: SB(r)0-a
- Size: ~98,900 ly (30.31 kpc) (estimated)
- Apparent size (V): 2.45′ × 0.8′

Other designations
- ESO 375- G 044, MCG -06-23-040, PGC 30945

NGC 3269 is a barred spiral or lenticular galaxy in the constellation Antlia. It is a member of the Antlia Cluster, which lies about 40.7 megaparsecs (132.7 million light-years) away. It was discovered by British astronomer John Herschel on 1 May 1834.

== See also ==
- List of NGC objects (3001–4000)
