= NGC 3267 =

Galaxy in the constellation Antlia

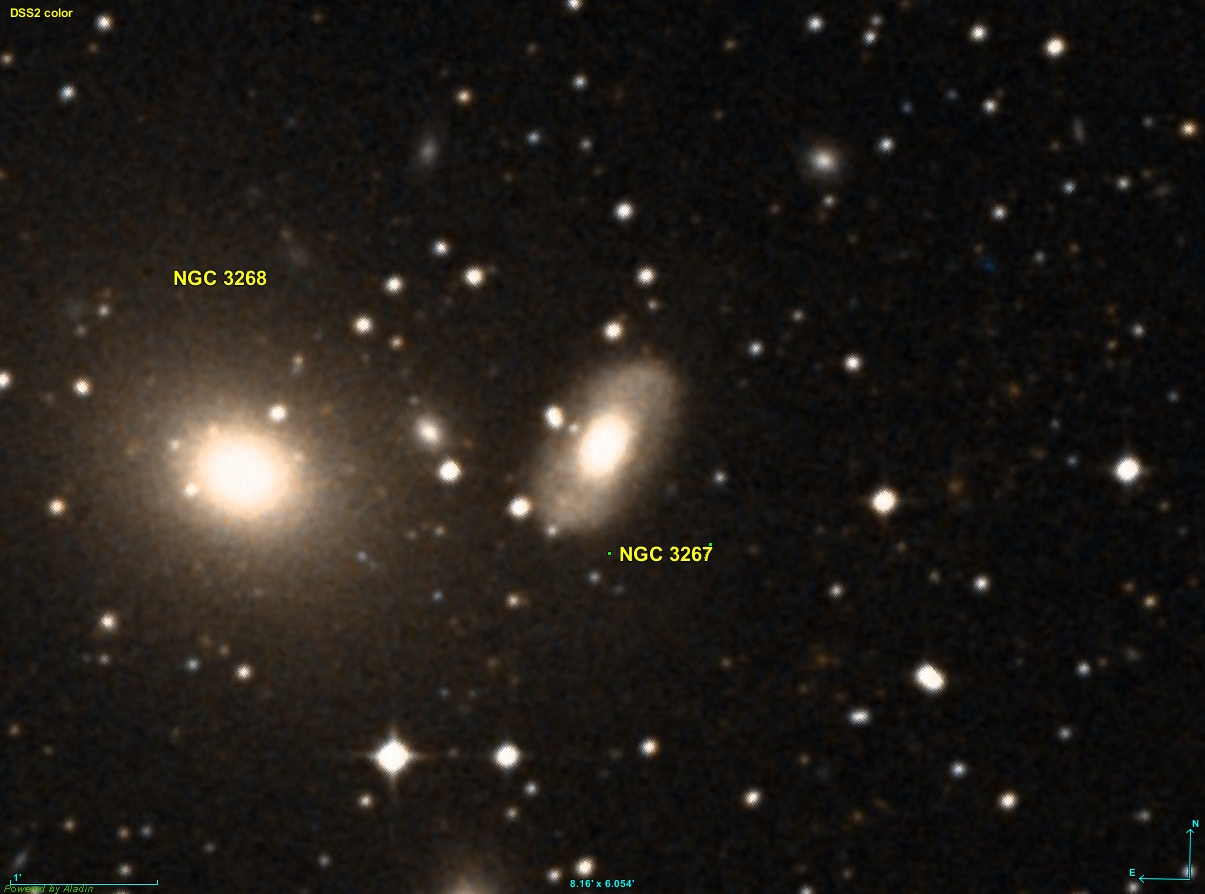
- DSS image of NGC 3267

Observation data (J2000 epoch)
- Constellation: Antlia
- Right ascension: 10^{h} 29^{m} 48.59^{s}
- Declination: −35° 19′ 20.6″
- Redshift: 0.01237
- Heliocentric radial velocity: 3709 km/s
- Distance: 169.4 Mly (51.95 Mpc)
- Group or cluster: Antlia Cluster
- Apparent magnitude (V): 11.7
- Apparent magnitude (B): 13.48

Characteristics
- Type: SAB(r)0^{0}

Other designations
- MCG -06-23-036, PGC 30934

NGC 3267 is a lenticular galaxy in the constellation Antlia. It is a member of the Antlia Cluster, which lies about 40.7 megaparsecs (132.7 million light-years) away. It was discovered on April 18, 1835 by the astronomer John Herschel.
