= NGC 3271 =

Galaxy in the constellation Antlia

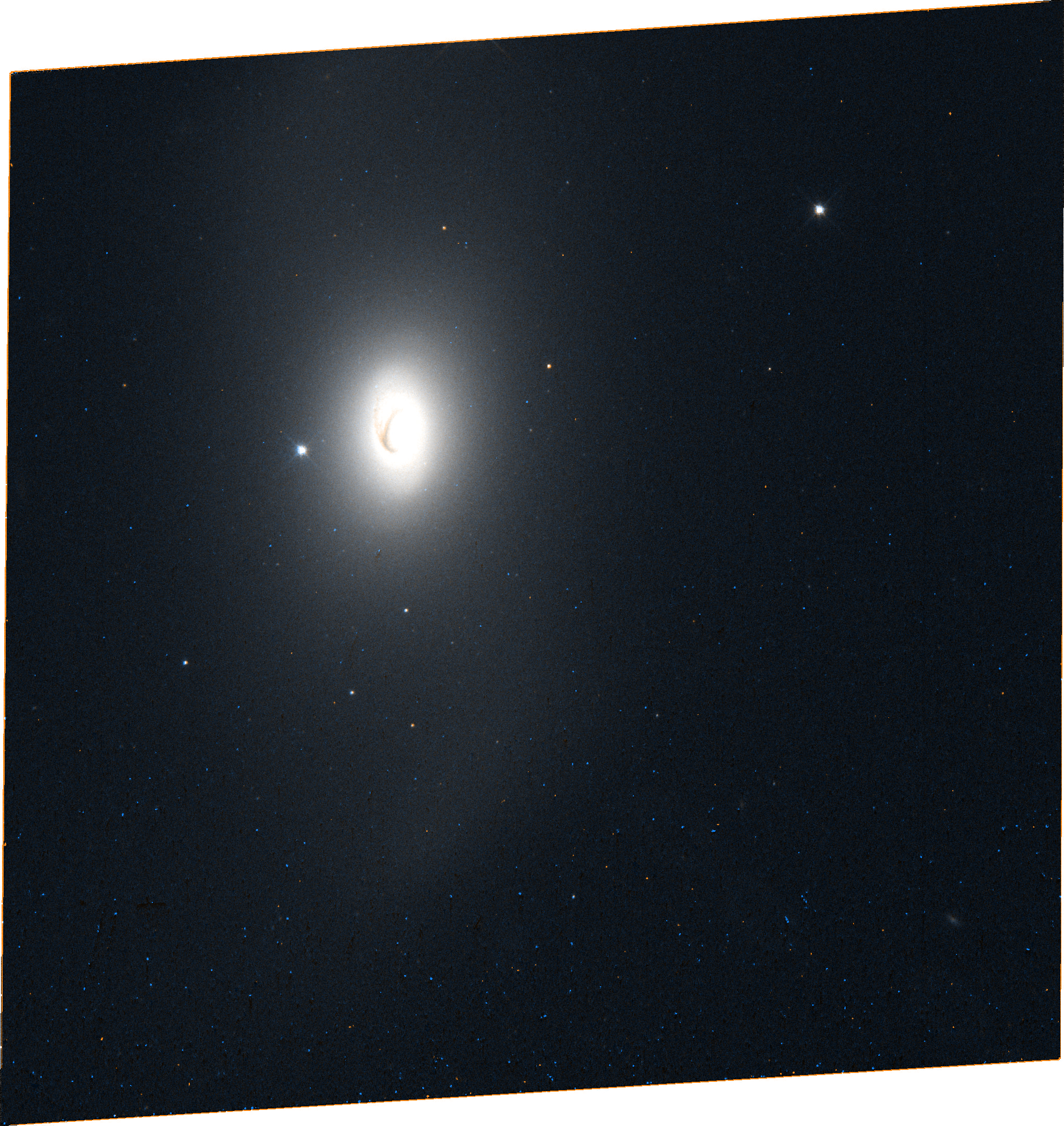
- Hubble Space Telescope image of NGC 3271

Observation data (J2000 epoch)
- Constellation: Antlia
- Right ascension: 10^{h} 30^{m} 26.49^{s}
- Declination: −35° 21′ 34.2″
- Redshift: 0.012544
- Heliocentric radial velocity: 3737 ± 27 km/s
- Distance: 170.8 Mly (52.37 Mpc)
- Apparent magnitude (V): 11.73
- Apparent magnitude (B): 12.72

Characteristics
- Type: SB0^{0}(r)

Other designations
- IC 2585, MCG -06-23-044, PGC 30988

NGC 3271 is a barred lenticular galaxy in the constellation Antlia. At magnitude 11.7, it is the brightest galaxy in the Antlia Cluster, which lies about 40.7 megaparsecs (132.7 million light-years) away. It was discovered on May 1, 1834 by the astronomer John Herschel.
