= NGC 3557 =

Galaxy in the constellation Centaurus

Observation data (J2000 epoch)
- Constellation: Centaurus
- Right ascension: 11^{h} 09^{m} 57.6396^{s}
- Declination: −37° 32′ 21.037″
- Redshift: 0.010270
- Heliocentric radial velocity: 3079 ± 6 km/s
- Distance: 163.5 ± 11.5 Mly (50.12 ± 3.53 Mpc)
- Apparent magnitude (V): 10.4

Characteristics
- Type: E3
- Size: ~246,200 ly (75.48 kpc) (estimated)
- Apparent size (V): 4.0′ × 3.0′

Other designations
- ESO 377- G 016, 2MASX J11095583-3732345, MCG -06-25-005, PGC 33871

NGC 3557 is a large elliptical galaxy in the constellation of Centaurus. Its velocity with respect to the cosmic microwave background is 3398 ± 23 km/s, which corresponds to a Hubble distance of 50.12 ± 3.53 Mpc (~163 million light-years). However, 20 non-redshift measurements give a distance of 32.905 ± 2.289 (~107 million light-years). The galaxy was discovered by British astronomer John Herschel on 21 April 1835.

The SIMBAD database lists NGC 3557 as a Seyfert I Galaxy, i.e. it has a quasar-like nuclei with very high surface brightnesses whose spectra reveal strong, high-ionisation emission lines, but unlike quasars, the host galaxy is clearly detectable. Additionally, NED lists NGC 3557 as a LINER galaxy, i.e. a galaxy whose nucleus has an emission spectrum characterized by broad lines of weakly ionized atoms.

== NGC 3557 Group ==
NGC 3557 is the largest and brightest galaxy in a group of galaxies that bears its name. The NGC 3557 group (also known as LGG 229) includes at least eleven galaxies, including NGC 3533, NGC 3557B, NGC 3564, NGC 3568 and NGC 3573.

== Supernova ==
One supernova has been observed in NGC 3557.

- SN 2023bpx (Type Ia, mag. 17) was discovered by the Backyard Observatory Supernova Search (BOSS) on 12 February 2023.

== Image gallery ==
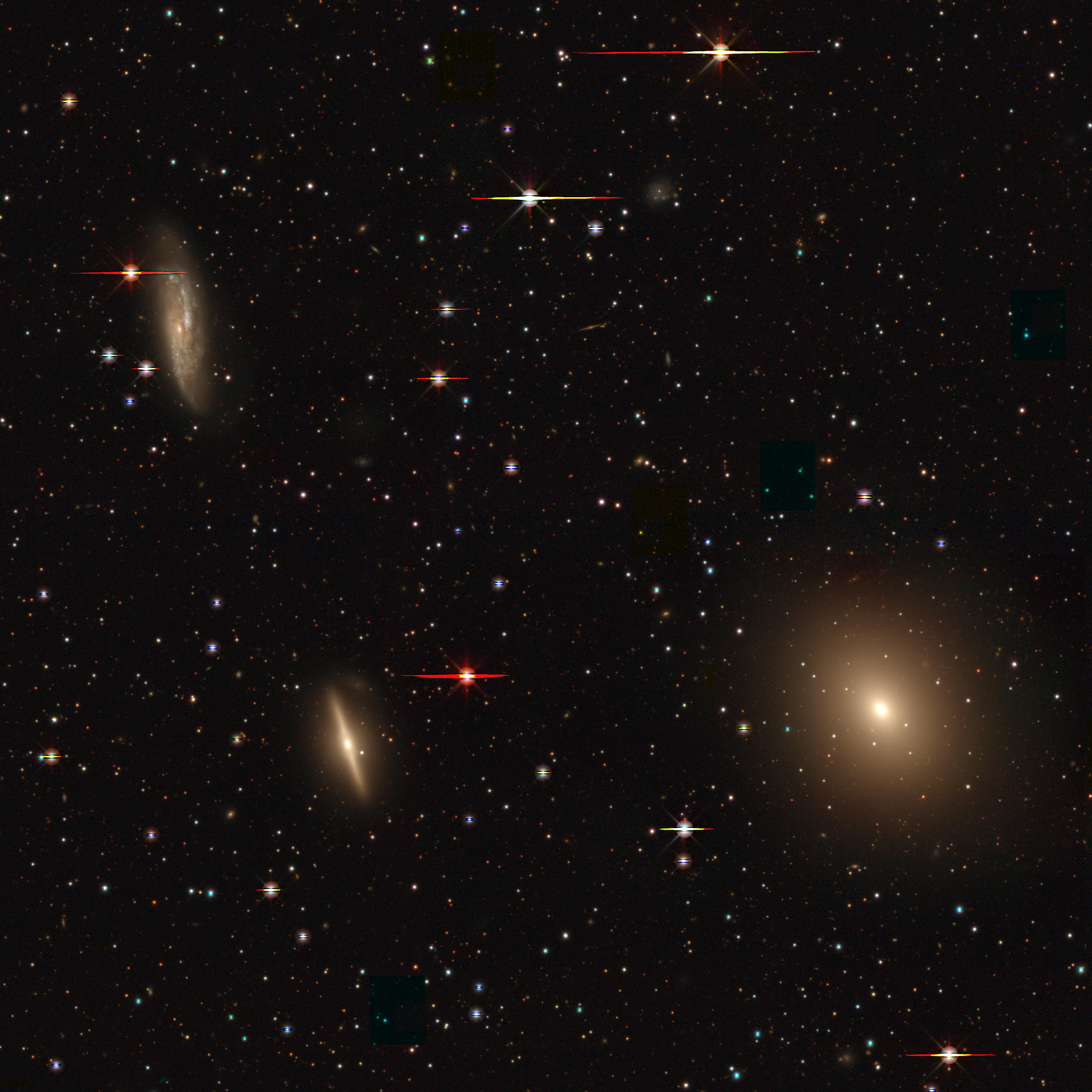
NGC 3557 (right), NGC 3564 (lower-left), and NGC 3568 (upper-left).

== See also ==
- List of NGC objects (3001–4000)
