= NGC 3281 =

Spiral galaxy in the constellation Antlia

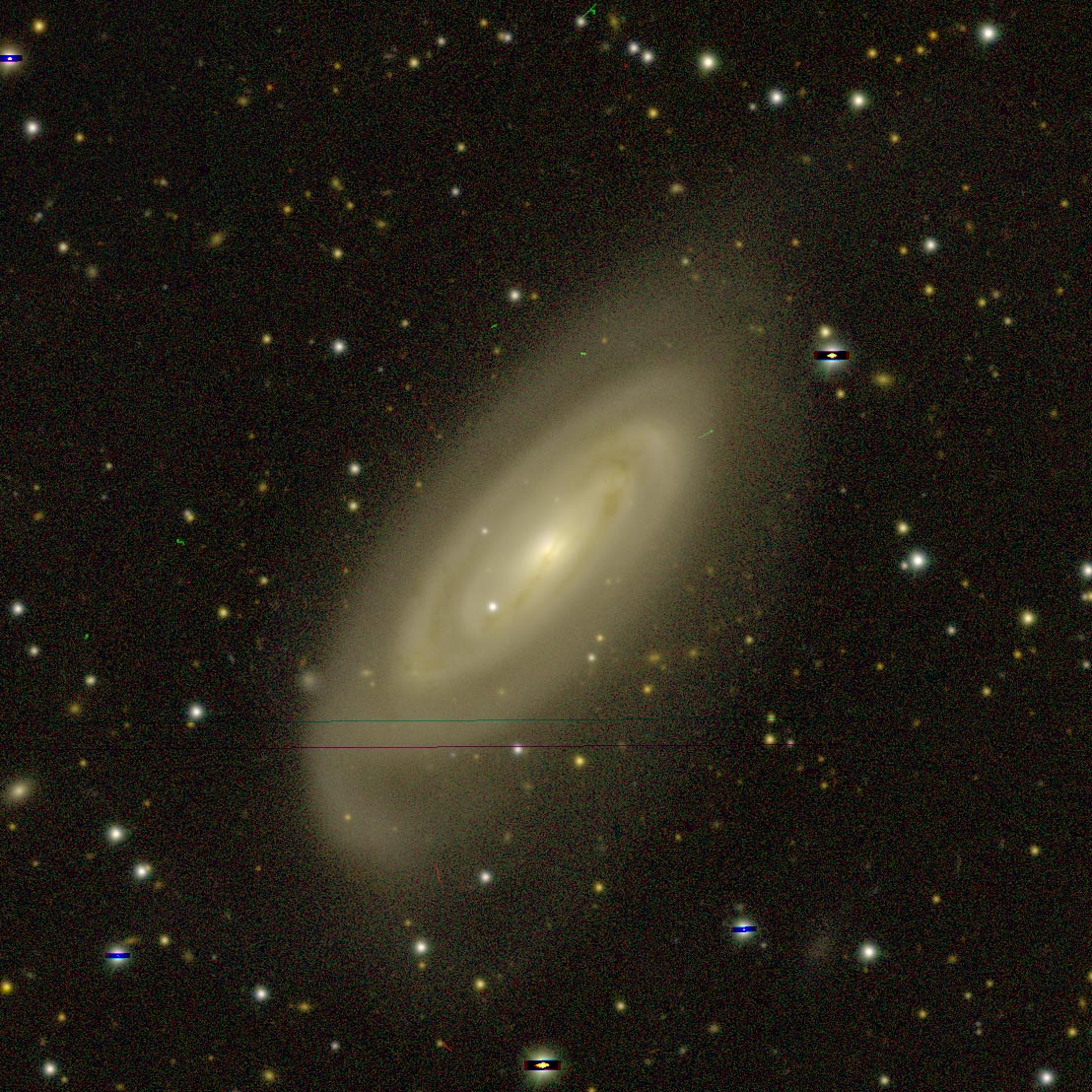
- legacy surveys image of NGC 3281

Observation data (J2000 epoch)
- Constellation: Antlia
- Right ascension: 10^{h} 31^{m} 52.086^{s}
- Declination: −34° 51′ 13.40″
- Heliocentric radial velocity: 3,200 km/s
- Distance: 144.7 Mly (44.36 Mpc)
- Apparent magnitude (V): 12.6

Characteristics
- Type: Sab

Other designations
- MCG-06-23-050, PBC J1031.8-3451, PGC 31090

NGC 3281 is a large unbarred spiral galaxy in the southern constellation of Antlia, located at a distance of 144.7 megalight-years from the Milky Way. The galaxy is inclined by an angle of 64° to the line-of-sight from the Earth, with the major axis aligned with a position angle of 137°. It is a luminous infrared galaxy and a type II Seyfert galaxy. NGC 3281 is a member of the Antlia Cluster, which belongs to the Hydra–Centaurus Supercluster.
