= NGC 2777 =

Spiral galaxy in the constellation Cancer

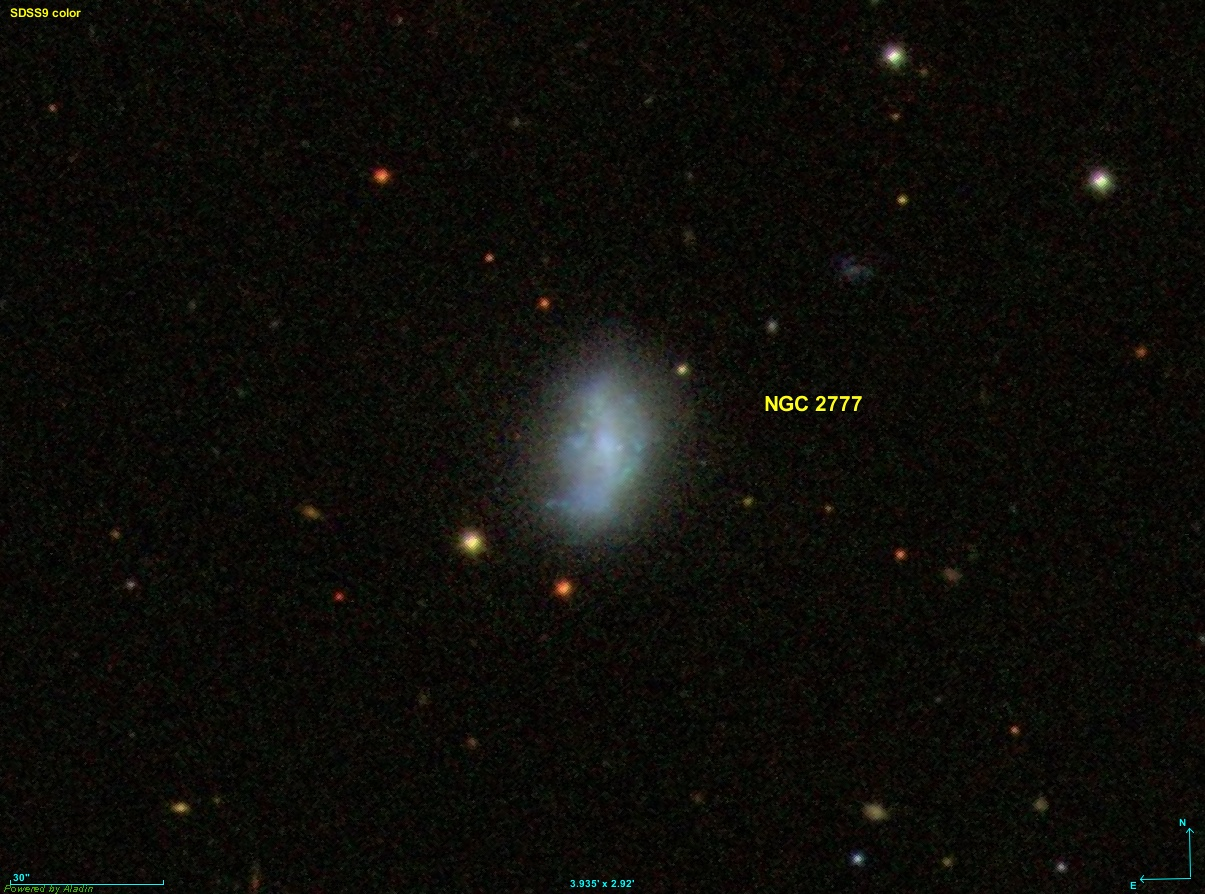
- NGC 2777 imaged by SDSS

Observation data (J2000 epoch)
- Constellation: Cancer
- Right ascension: 09^{h} 10^{m} 41.8638^{s}
- Declination: +07° 12′ 24.147″
- Redshift: 0.004908 ± 0.0000007
- Heliocentric radial velocity: 1471 ± 2 km/s
- Distance: 83.82 Mly (25.700 Mpc)
- Apparent magnitude (V): 13.65

Characteristics
- Type: SAb?
- Size: ~207,100 ly (63.50 kpc) (estimated)

Other designations
- UGC 4823, MCG +01-24-006, CGCG 034-008

NGC 2777 (also known as UGC 4823) is a spiral galaxy in the constellation Cancer. It was discovered by Albert Marth on 6 March 1864.

== NGC 2775 Group ==
NGC 2777 is a member of the NGC 2775 Group (also known as LGG 169), a small galaxy group in the Virgo Supercluster, along with the Local Group. Other members of the NGC 2775 Group include UGC 4781 and UGC 4797.

== Supernova ==
One supernova has been observed in NGC 2777: SN 2022aagp (Type II, mag. 15.7649) was discovered by the Zwicky Transient Facility on 14 November 2022.

== See also ==
- List of NGC objects (1001-2000)
- List of NGC objects
