= NGC 3258 =

Galaxy in the constellation Antlia

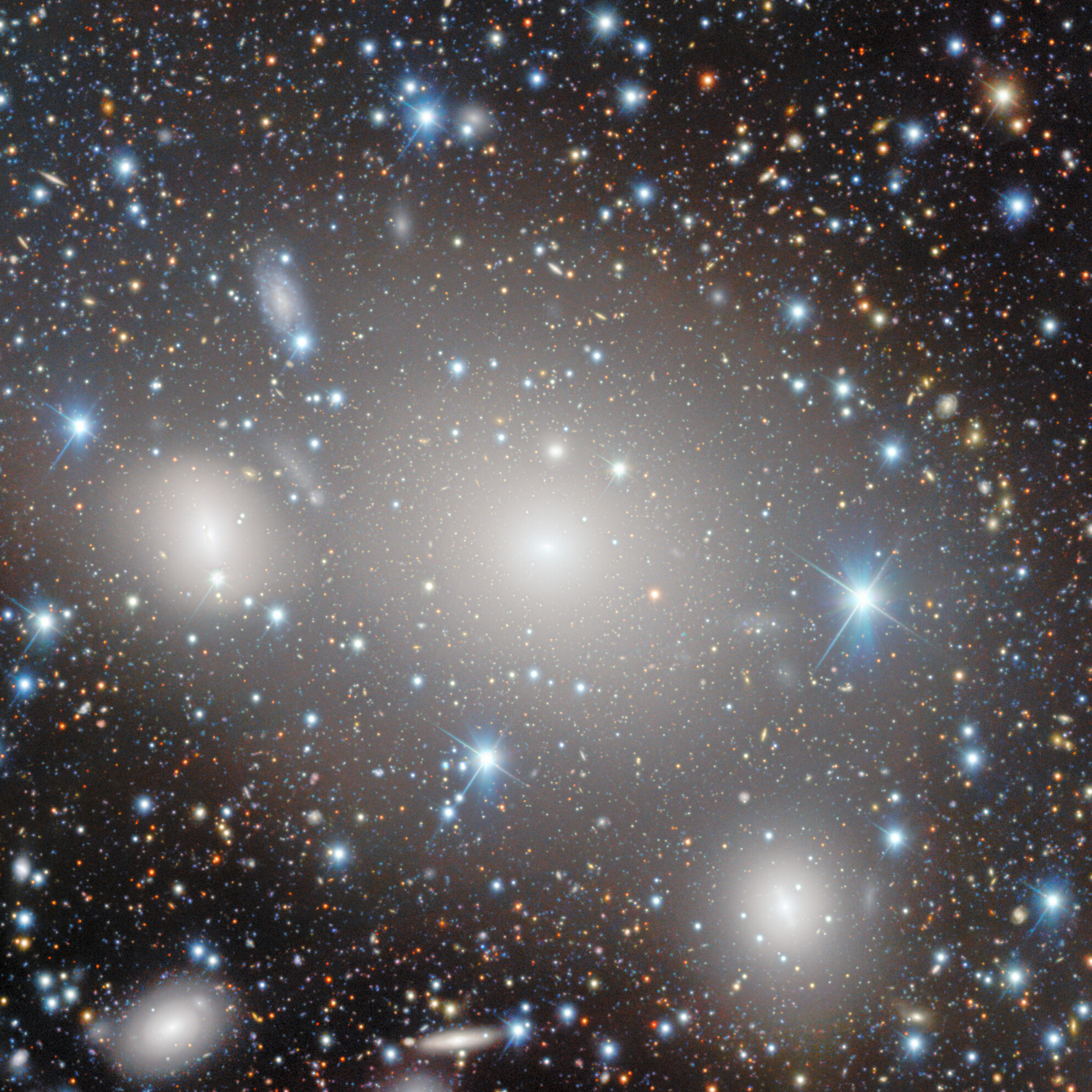
- NGC 3258 (center) imaged by the Víctor M. Blanco Telescope

Observation data (J2000 epoch)
- Constellation: Antlia
- Right ascension: 10^{h} 28^{m} 53.588^{s}
- Declination: −35° 36′ 19.98″
- Redshift: 0.009357
- Heliocentric radial velocity: 2,792±28 km/s
- Distance: 124.3 Mly (38.11 Mpc)
- Group or cluster: Antlia Cluster
- Apparent magnitude (V): 11.72
- Apparent magnitude (B): 12.50

Characteristics
- Type: E1
- Size: ~193,900 ly (59.45 kpc) (estimated)
- Apparent size (V): 2.9′ × 2.5′

Other designations
- ESO 375- G 037, NGC 3258, LEDA 30859, MCG -06-23-032, PGC 30859

NGC 3258 is a giant elliptical galaxy in the southern constellation of Antlia. It was discovered by British astronomer John Herschel on May 2, 1834. NGC 3258 is one of the two brightest members of the Antlia Cluster, which lies about 40.7 megaparsecs (132.7 million light-years) away from the Milky Way. It is the namesake of the sparse NGC 3258 group of galaxies that includes the elliptical galaxy NGC 3260 and barred spiral NGC 3257.

The morphological classification of NGC 3258 is E1, which indicates it displays a mild ellipticity. It is a weak, extended radio source. Photometry shows a disk of dust around the center of the galaxy, which is aligned with the major axis. There is a heated component of this disk with a mass of 48 M_{☉} within a radius of 5.5 kpc, which may indicate star formation. Based on a lack of X-ray emission, there is no indication of activity at the center.

ALMA observations of the cold gas disk near the supermassive black hole at the core provide a mass estimate of 2.249×10^{9} M_{☉} with an uncertainty of 0.18%. Spectroscopic observations of star motions near the core yield an independent mass estimate of (2.2±0.2)×10^{9} M_{☉}, which is a good match to the ALMA estimate.

NGC 3258 has an extensive population of globular clusters that is estimated at 6000±150. A population of 23 ultra-compact dwarfs have been identified in the vicinity of NGC 3258, some of which may be former dwarf galaxies that have been captured and stripped during minor merger events. These objects provide a mass estimate of 2.7×10^{12} M_{☉} within a radius of around 47 kpc from the galactic center.

One supernova has been observed in NGC 3258. The type Ia supernova SN 2010hx was discovered by Berto Monard on September 16, 2010 at a magnitude of 15.3.
