= NGC 3449 =

Galaxy in the constellation Antlia

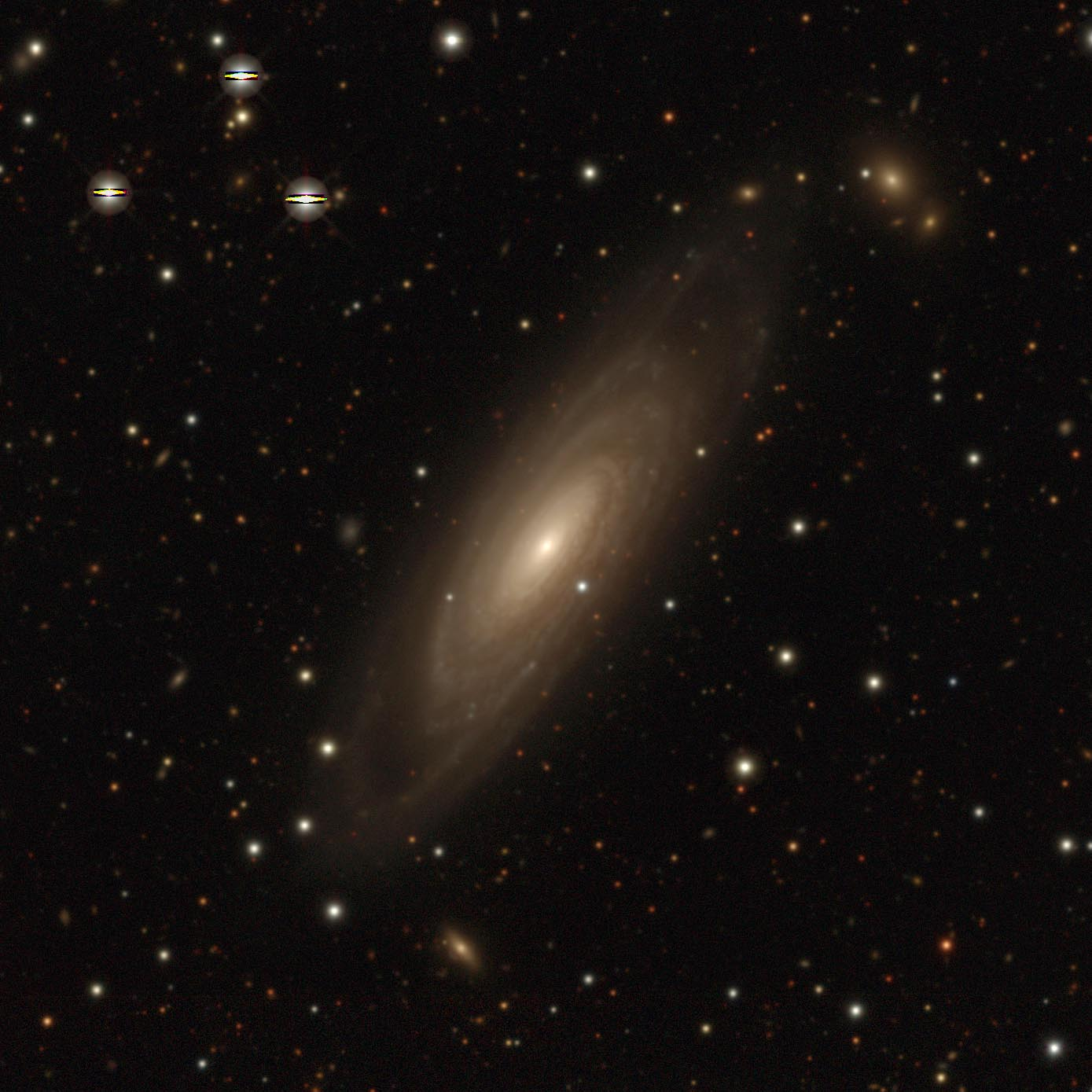
- NGC 3449 imaged by Legacy Surveys

Observation data (J2000 epoch)
- Constellation: Antlia
- Right ascension: 10^{h} 52^{m} 53.6609^{s}
- Declination: −32° 55′ 39.202″
- Redshift: 0.010928±0.000019
- Heliocentric radial velocity: 3,276±6 km/s
- Distance: 151.97 ± 3.98 Mly (46.595 ± 1.221 Mpc)
- Group or cluster: NGC 3449 Group (LGG 222)
- Apparent magnitude (V): 12.19

Characteristics
- Type: SA(s)ab
- Size: ~222,500 ly (68.22 kpc) (estimated)
- Apparent size (V): 3.3′ × 1.0′

Other designations
- ESO 376- G 025, IRAS 10505-3240, MCG -05-26-010, PGC 32666

NGC 3449 is a spiral galaxy in the constellation of Antlia. Its velocity with respect to the cosmic microwave background is 3,609±17 km/s, which corresponds to a Hubble distance of 173.6 ± 12.2 Mly (53.23 ± 3.74 Mpc). However, 20 non-redshift measurements give a closer mean distance of 151.97 ± 3.98 Mly (46.595 ± 1.221 Mpc). It was discovered by British astronomer John Herschel on 29 April 1834.

== NGC 3449 group ==
NGC 3449 is the namesake of a trio of galaxies called the NGC 3449 group (also known as LGG 222). The other two galaxies are ESO 437-67 and ESO 437-65.

== Supernovae ==
Two supernovae have been observed in NGC 3449:

- SN 2012bu (Type II-P, mag. 18.4) was discovered by Stan Howerton and the Siding Spring Survey on 16 January 2012.
- ASASSN-15aj (Type Ia, mag. 15.0) was discovered by ASAS-SN on 8 January 2015.

== See also ==
- List of NGC objects (3001–4000)
