= NGC 3568 =

Galaxy in the constellation Centaurus

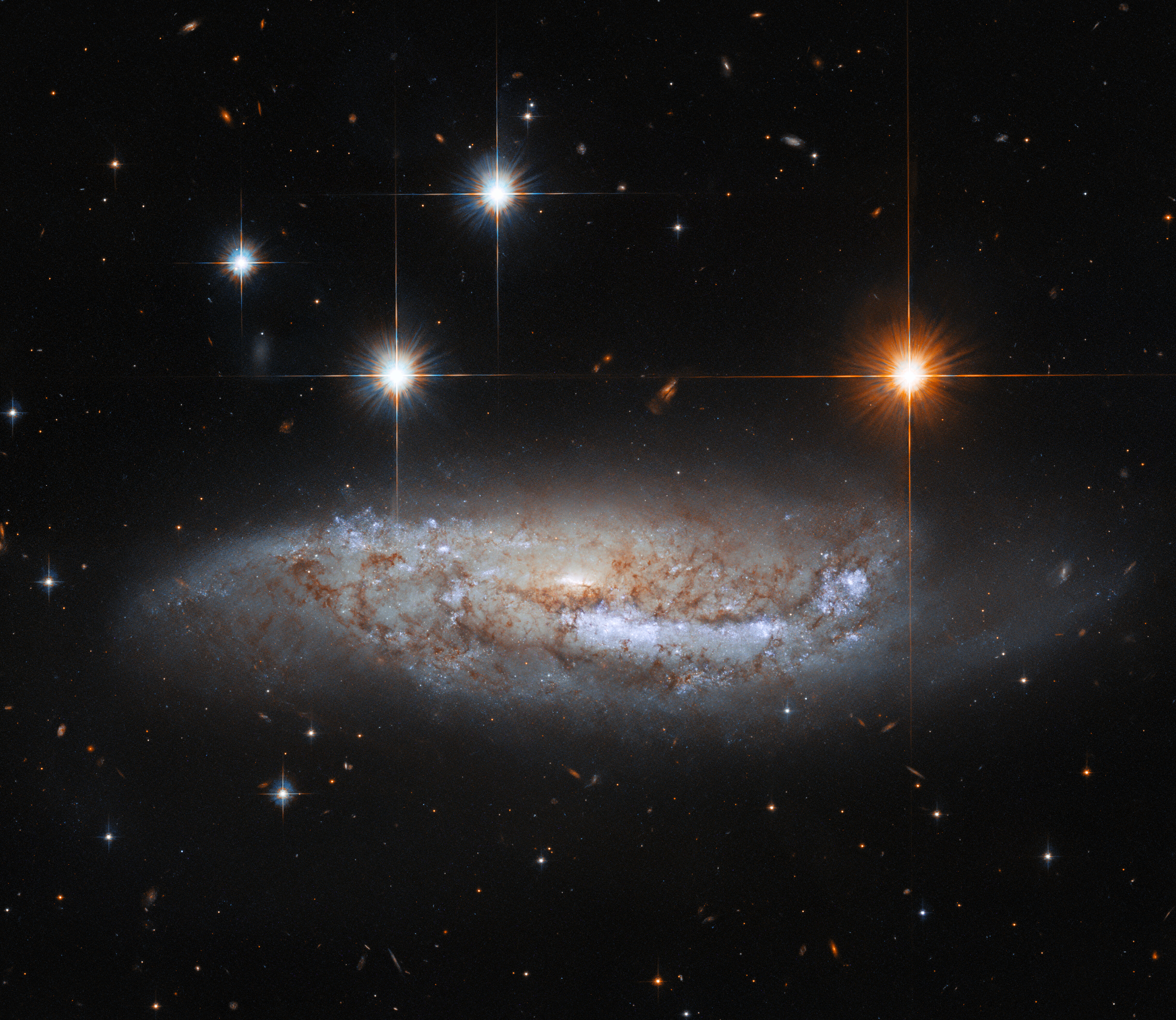
- NGC 3568 imaged by the Hubble Space Telescope

Observation data (J2000 epoch)
- Constellation: Centaurus
- Right ascension: 11^{h} 10^{m} 48.4926^{s}
- Declination: −37° 26′ 51.601″
- Redshift: 0.008152±0.00000700
- Heliocentric radial velocity: 2,444±2 km/s
- Distance: 81.96 ± 3.65 Mly (25.128 ± 1.119 Mpc)
- Group or cluster: NGC 3557 group (LGG 229)
- Apparent magnitude (V): 13.00

Characteristics
- Type: SB(s)c
- Size: ~91,000 ly (27.91 kpc) (estimated)
- Apparent size (V): 2.5′ × 0.8′

Other designations
- ESO 377- G 020, IRAS 11084-3710, 2MASX J11104858-3726523, MCG -06-25-009, PGC 33952

NGC 3568 is a barred spiral galaxy in the constellation of Centaurus. Its velocity with respect to the cosmic microwave background is 2,764±22 km/s, which corresponds to a Hubble distance of 132.9 ± 9.4 Mly (40.76 ± 2.87 Mpc). However, 25 non-redshift measurements give a much closer mean distance of 81.96 ± 3.65 Mly (25.128 ± 1.119 Mpc). It was discovered by British astronomer John Herschel on 21 April 1835.

NGC 3568 is a Seyfert I galaxy, i.e. it has a quasar-like nucleus with very high surface brightnesses whose spectra reveal strong, high-ionisation emission lines, but unlike quasars, the host galaxy is clearly detectable.

== NGC 3557 group ==
NGC 3568 is a member of the NGC 3557 group (also known as LGG 229) which has at least 11 galaxies, including NGC 3533, NGC 3557, NGC 3557B, NGC 3564, and NGC 3573, among others.

== Supernova ==
One supernova has been observed in NGC 3568:

- SN 2014dw (Type II, mag. 15.5) was discovered by Stu Parker on 6 November 2014.

== See also ==
- List of NGC objects (3001–4000)
