= NGC 3260 =

Galaxy in the constellation Antlia

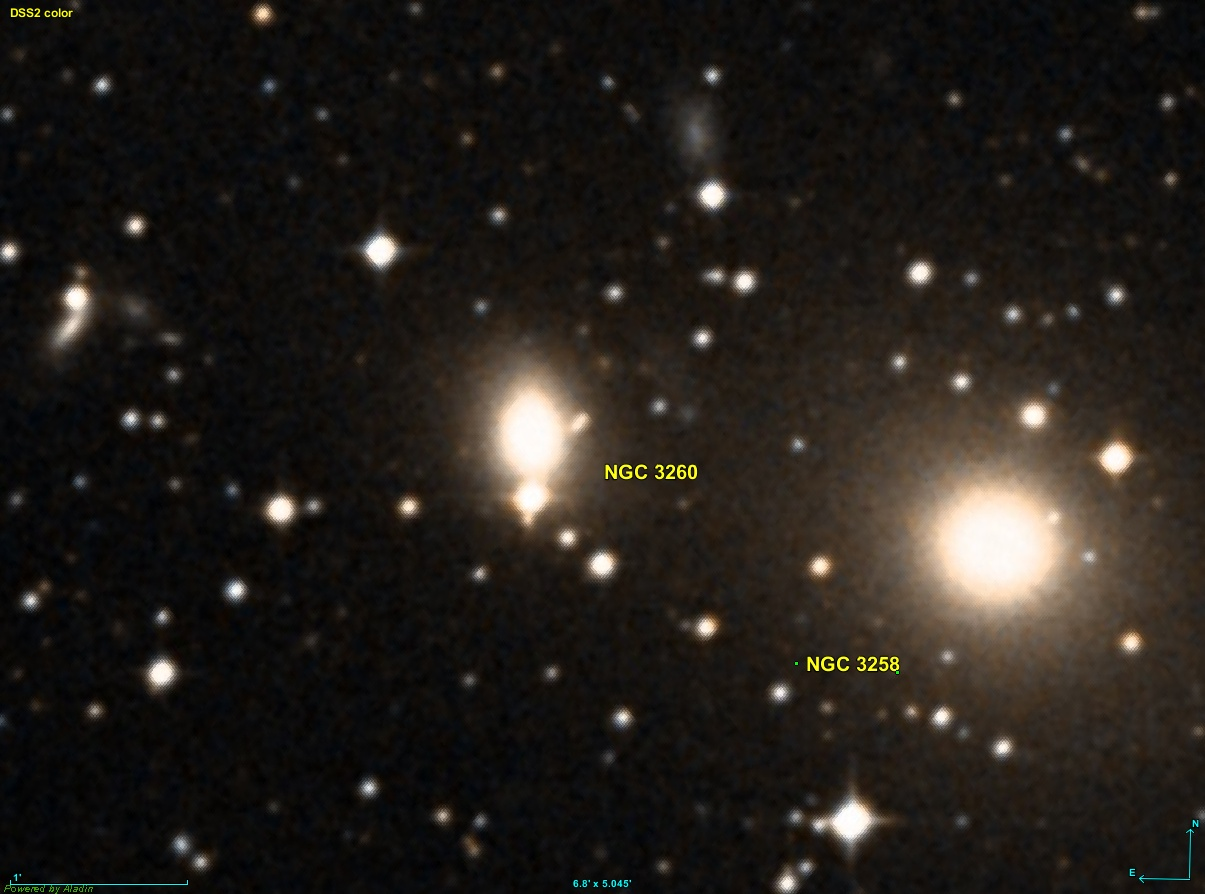
- DSS image of NGC 3260

Observation data (J2000 epoch)
- Constellation: Antlia
- Right ascension: 10^{h} 29^{m} 06.39496^{s}
- Declination: −35° 35′ 42.4860″
- Redshift: 0.008169
- Heliocentric radial velocity: 2349 km/s
- Distance: 108.0 Mly (33.11 Mpc)
- Apparent magnitude (V): 12.67
- Apparent magnitude (B): 13.73

Characteristics
- Type: E pec:

Other designations
- MCG -06-23-033, PGC 30875

NGC 3260 is an elliptical galaxy in the constellation Antlia. It is a member of the Antlia Cluster, which lies about 40.7 megaparsecs (132.7 million light-years) away. It was discovered on May 2, 1834 by the astronomer John Herschel.
