= NGC 3001 =

Galaxy in the constellation Antlia

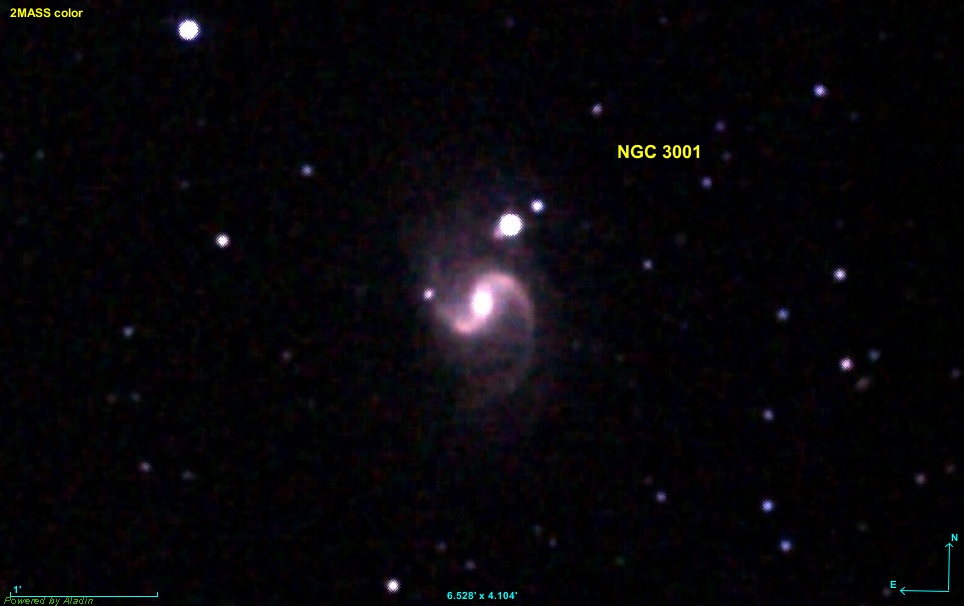
- 2MASS image of NGC 3001

Observation data (J2000 epoch)
- Constellation: Antlia
- Right ascension: 09^{h} 46^{m} 18.64942^{s}
- Declination: −30° 26′ 15.0501″
- Redshift: 0.008224
- Heliocentric radial velocity: 2455.5 km/s
- Distance: 164.22 ± 0.65 Mly (50.35 ± 0.20 Mpc)
- Apparent magnitude (V): 11.83
- Apparent magnitude (B): 12.15

Characteristics
- Type: SBbc

Other designations
- ESO 434- G 038, UGCA 183, MCG -05-23-014, PGC 28027

NGC 3001 is a magnitude 11.83 spiral galaxy in the constellation Antlia, discovered on 30 March 1835 by John Herschel. It has a recessional velocity of 2,465 kilometres (1,532 mi) per second, and is located around 115 million light years away. NGC 3001 has an apparent size of 4.3 by 3.1 arcminutes and is about 145 thousand light years across.

One supernova has been observed in NGC 3001: SN 2010hg (Type Ia, mag. 15) was discovered by Berto Monard on 1 September 2010.

== See also ==
- List of NGC objects (3001–4000)
