= NGC 3268 =

Galaxy in the constellation Antlia

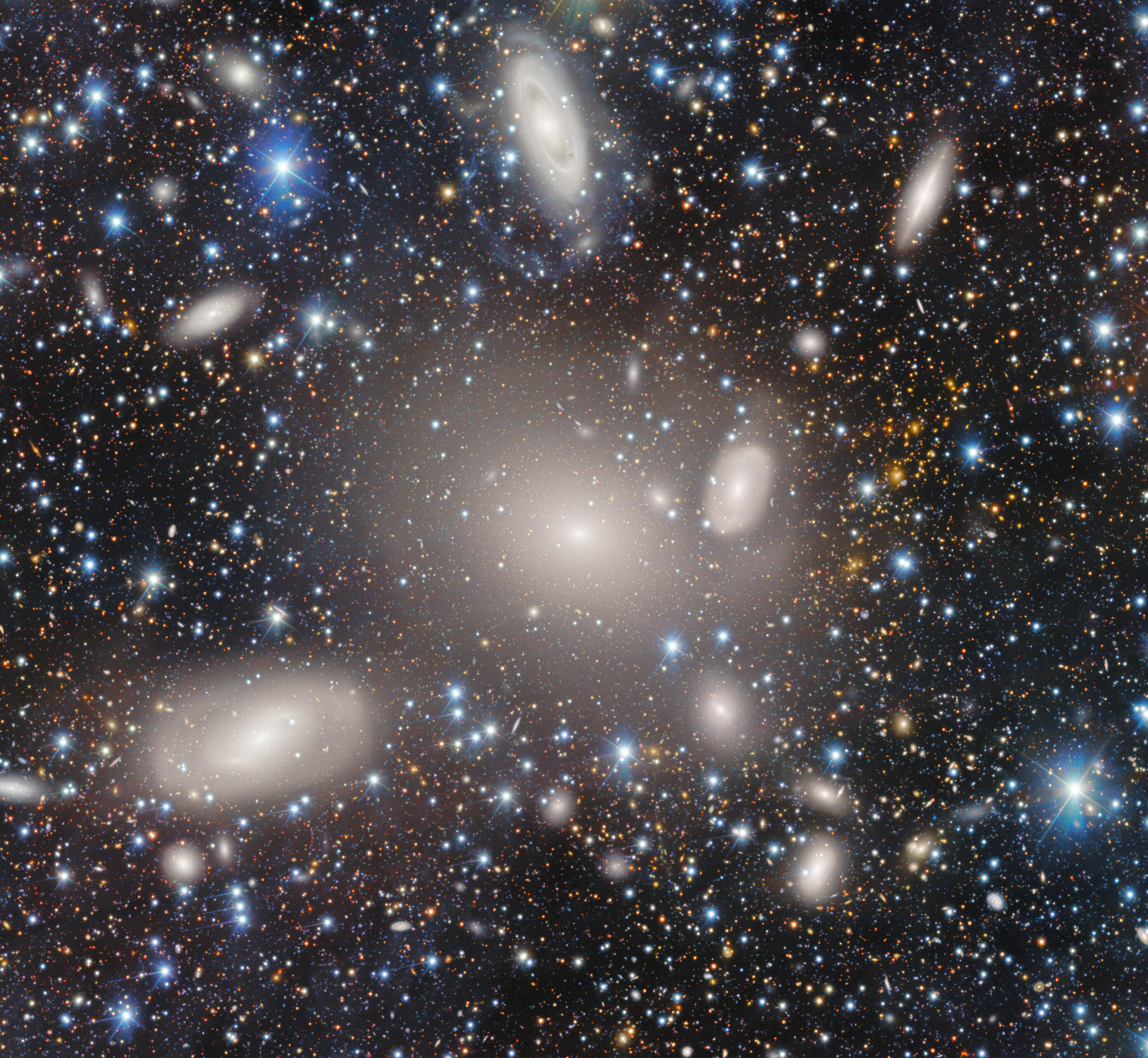
- NGC 3268 (center) imaged by the Víctor M. Blanco Telescope

Observation data (J2000 epoch)
- Constellation: Antlia
- Right ascension: 10^{h} 30^{m} 00.655^{s}
- Declination: −35° 19′ 31.83″
- Redshift: 0.009384
- Heliocentric radial velocity: 2800 ± 21 km/s
- Distance: 125.3 Mly (38.43 Mpc)
- Apparent magnitude (V): 11.77
- Apparent magnitude (B): 12.57

Characteristics
- Type: E2
- Size: ~164,900 ly (50.56 kpc) (estimated)
- Apparent size (V): 3.5′ × 2.5′

Other designations
- ESO 375- G 045, MCG -06-23-041, PGC 30949

NGC 3268 is an elliptical galaxy in the constellation Antlia. It is a member of the Antlia Cluster, which lies about 40.7 megaparsecs (132.7 million light-years) away. It was discovered by British astronomer John Herschel on April 18, 1835.

== See also ==
- List of NGC objects (3001–4000)
