= Antlia Cluster =

Galaxy cluster in the constellation Antlia

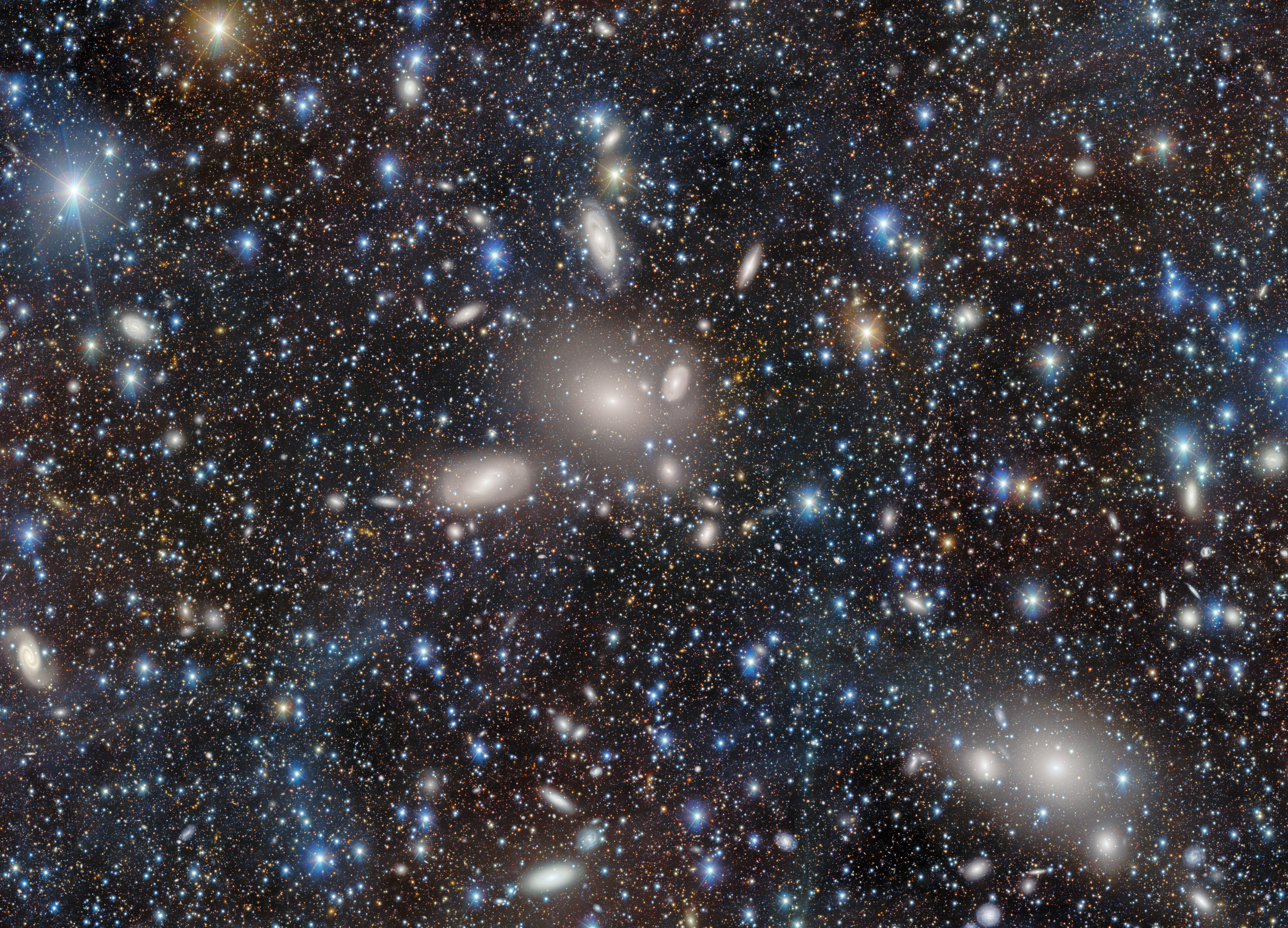
- DECam Deep View of the Antlia Cluster

Observation data (Epoch J2000)
- Constellation: Antlia
- Right ascension: 10^{h} 30^{m} 03.5^{s}
- Declination: −35° 19′ 24″
- Brightest member: NGC 3268, NGC 3258
- Number of galaxies: 254
- Richness class: 0
- Bautz–Morgan classification: I-II
- Velocity dispersion: 444–591 km/s
- Redshift: 0.0087
- Distance: 40.7 Mpc (132.7 Mly)
- ICM temperature: ~2.0 keV
- Binding mass: ~3.3×10^{14} M_{☉}
- X-ray luminosity: 3.4×10^{42} h_{75}^{−2} erg/s (0.5-10.0 keV)

Other designations
- Abell S0636

The Antlia Cluster (or Abell S0636) is a cluster of galaxies located in the Hydra–Centaurus Supercluster. The Antlia Cluster is the third-nearest to the Local Group after the Virgo Cluster and Fornax Cluster. Antlia's distance from Earth is 40.5 megaparsecs (132.1 megalight-years) to 40.9 Mpc (133.4 Mly) and can be viewed from Earth in the constellation Antlia. The Antlia Cluster should not be confused with the Antlia Dwarf galaxy.

Antlia is classified as a rare Bautz–Morgan type III cluster, meaning it has no central dominant (cD) brightest cluster galaxy. However, the cluster is dominated by two massive elliptical galaxies, NGC 3268 and NGC 3258, and contains a total of about 234 galaxies. The cluster is very dense compared to other clusters such as Virgo and Fornax, thus containing early-type galaxies and a larger portion of dwarf ellipticals. The cluster is split into two galaxy groups, the Northern subgroup gravitating around NGC 3268, and the Southern subgroup centered on NGC 3258.

The cluster has an overall redshift of z = 0.0087, implying that the cluster is, like most objects in the Universe, receding from the Local Group. Using the now-obsolete scientific satellite ASCA, X-ray observations show that the cluster is almost isothermal, with a mean temperature of kT ~ 2.0 keV.

== List of named objects in the Antlia Cluster ==
- NGC 3267
- NGC 3568
- NGC 3258
- NGC 3269
- NGC 3271
- NGC 3258A
- NGC 3258B
- NGC 3260
- NGC 3268
- NGC 3273

== See also ==
- Coma Cluster
- Eridanus Cluster
- List of galaxy groups and clusters
- Norma Cluster
