= NGC 3998 =

Galaxy in the constellation of Ursa Major

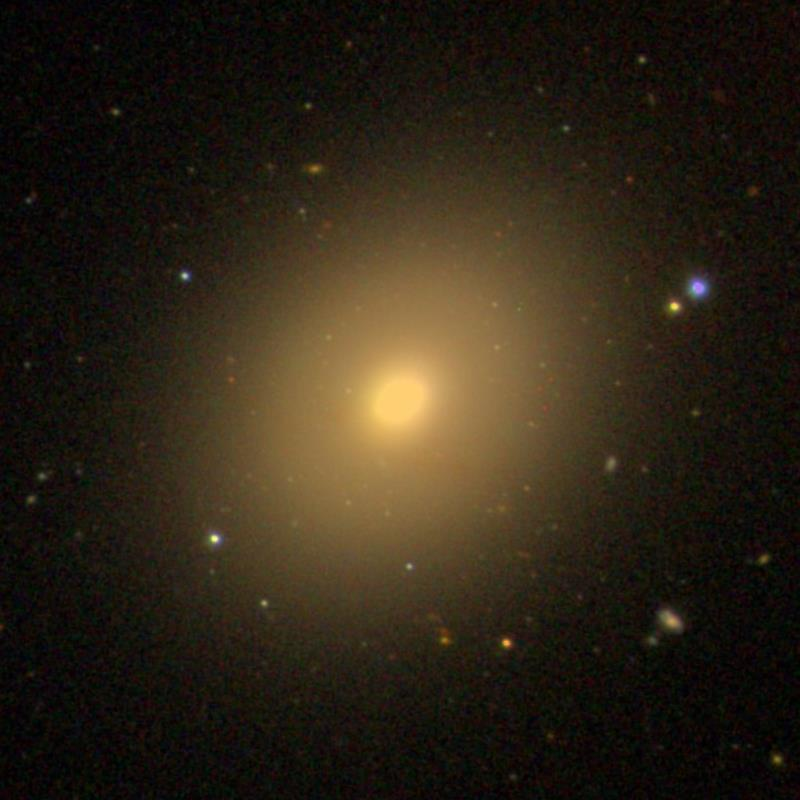
- SDSS image of NGC 3998

Observation data (J2000 epoch)
- Constellation: Ursa Major
- Right ascension: 11^{h} 57^{m} 56.1333^{s}
- Declination: +55° 27′ 12.922″
- Redshift: 0.003401
- Heliocentric radial velocity: 1020 ± 0 km/s
- Distance: 45 Mly (13.7 Mpc)
- Group or cluster: NGC 3631 group (LGG 241)
- Apparent magnitude (V): 12.10
- Apparent magnitude (B): 11.64

Characteristics
- Type: SA0^{0}(r):
- Size: ~60,700 ly (18.61 kpc) (estimated)
- Apparent size (V): 2.7′ × 2.3′

Other designations
- HOLM 310A, IRAS F11553+5543, UGC 6946, MCG +09-20-046, PGC 37642, CGCG 269-025

NGC 3998 is a lenticular galaxy located in the constellation Ursa Major. It was discovered on April 14, 1789, by German-British astronomer William Herschel. At a distance of 45 million light-years (13.7 megaparsecs), it is located relatively nearby, making it a well-studied object.

In Gérard de Vaucouleurs' atlas of galaxy morphological types, NGC 3998 has a classification of SA0^{0}(r):, meaning it is unbarred and has an internal ring. It is classified as a LINER-type galaxy. As an early-type galaxy, NGC 3998's stars are relatively old and reddish in color, but its nuclear region may still have signs of star formation with stars less than 10 million years old. The galaxy's shape is very round, and also oblate.

== Structure ==
NGC 3998 contains an active galactic nucleus, or AGN. These are supermassive black holes that are surrounded by accretion disks that emit large amounts of energy across the electromagnetic spectrum. The supermassive black hole has been modeled to be about 8.1+2.0
−1.9×10^{8} M_{☉} The AGN's power is relatively low, and like most other low-power radio galaxies, most of its emission is concentrated near its core. However, it also has some S-shaped lobes of emission, which are quite young and active, at only a few tens of millions of years old.

NGC 3998 has a small disk of ionized Hα radiation that is about roughly 100 parsecs wide, along with a larger, warped disk of neutral hydrogen. It is thought that the gas disk has just started to align with the stellar distribution, which would also explain the warped shape of the radio emission.

== NGC 3631 Group ==
According to A.M. Garcia, NGC 3998 is part of the NGC 3631 group (also known as LGG 241). This group includes at least 10 galaxies, including NGC 3631, NGC 3657, NGC 3718, NGC 3729, NGC 3913, NGC 3972, UGC 6251, UGC 6446, and UGC 6816.

== See also ==
- List of NGC objects (3001–4000)
