= NGC 3972 =

Galaxy in the constellation Ursa Major

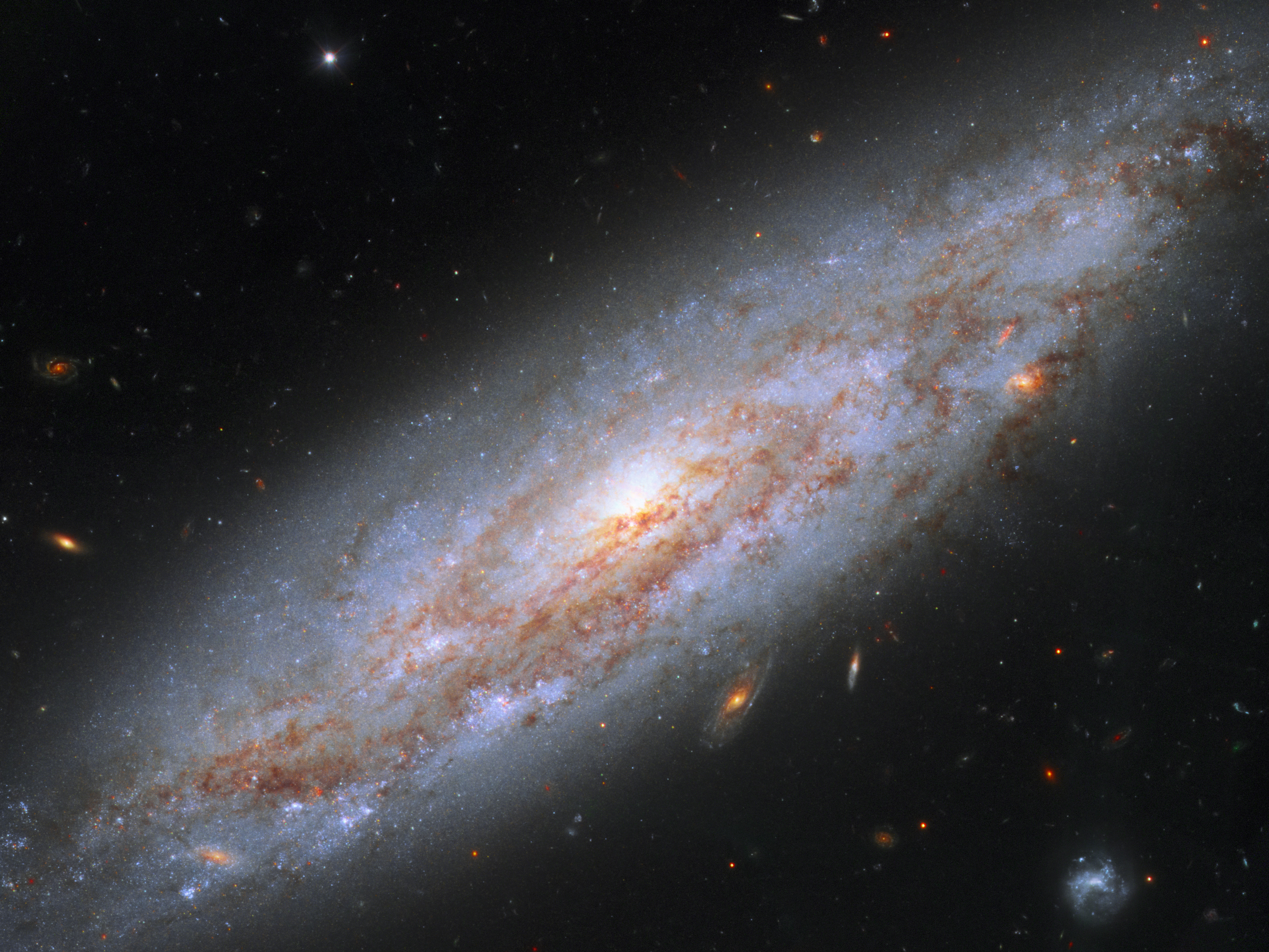
- NGC 3972 imaged by the Hubble Space Telescope.

Observation data (J2000 epoch)
- Constellation: Ursa Major
- Right ascension: 11^{h} 55^{m} 45.1^{s}
- Declination: +55° 19′ 14″
- Redshift: 0.002799
- Heliocentric radial velocity: 846 km/s
- Distance: 66.0 Mly (20.23 Mpc)
- Group or cluster: NGC 3992 Group
- Apparent magnitude (V): 13.14

Characteristics
- Type: SA(s)bc, SBbc
- Size: c. 50,000 ly

Other designations
- IRAS 11531+5535, 2MASX J11554511+5519144, UGC 6904, LEDA 37466, MCG +09-20-032

NGC 3972 is a spiral galaxy located in the northern constellation of Ursa Major. It was discovered by William Herschel on April 14, 1789. This galaxy is located 66 million light years away and is receding with a heliocentric radial velocity of 846 km/s. It is a member of the NGC 3992 Group of galaxies.

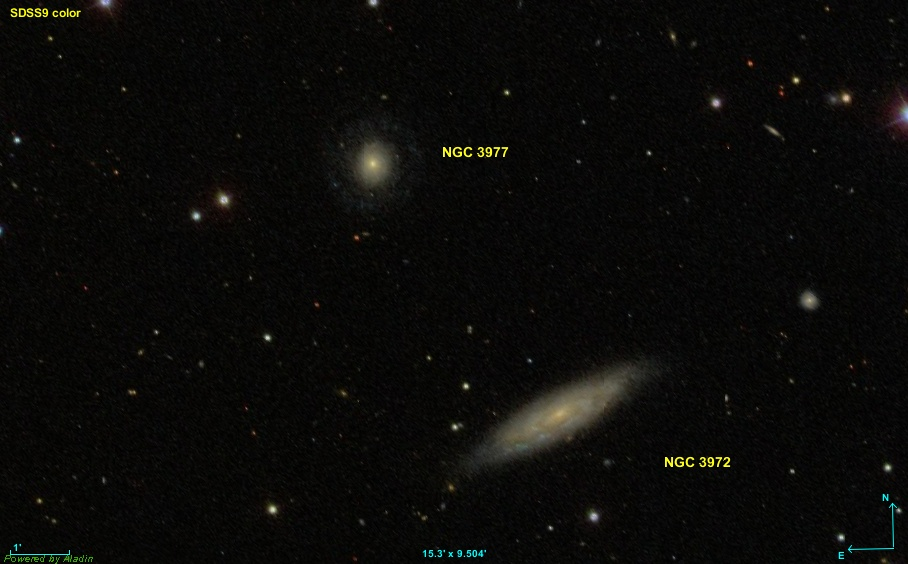
NGC 3972 with NGC 3977

NGC 3972 along with NGC 3977 are listed together as Holm 304 in Erik Holmberg's A Study of Double and Multiple Galaxies Together with Inquiries into some General Metagalactic Problems, published in 1937. This grouping is purely optical, as NGC 3977 is about four times farther away than NGC 3972.

NGC 3972 is a radio galaxy, i.e. a galaxy with giant regions of radio emission extending well beyond its visible structure.

== NGC 3631 Group ==
According to A.M. Garcia, NGC 3972 is part of the NGC 3631 group (also known as LGG 241). This group includes at least 10 galaxies, including NGC 3631, NGC 3657, NGC 3718, NGC 3729, NGC 3913, NGC 3998, UGC 6251, UGC 6446, and UGC 6816.

== Supernovae ==
Two supernovae have been observed in NGC 3972:

- SN 2011by (Type Ia, mag. 14.2) was discovered by Zhangwei Jin and Xing Gao in China, on 27 April 2011. It was ten days short of maximum, and positioned at an offset 5.3″ east and 19.1″ north of the galactic nucleus.
- SN 2021acna (Type II, mag. 19.39) was discovered by the Zwicky Transient Facility on 30 October 2021.

== Gallery ==
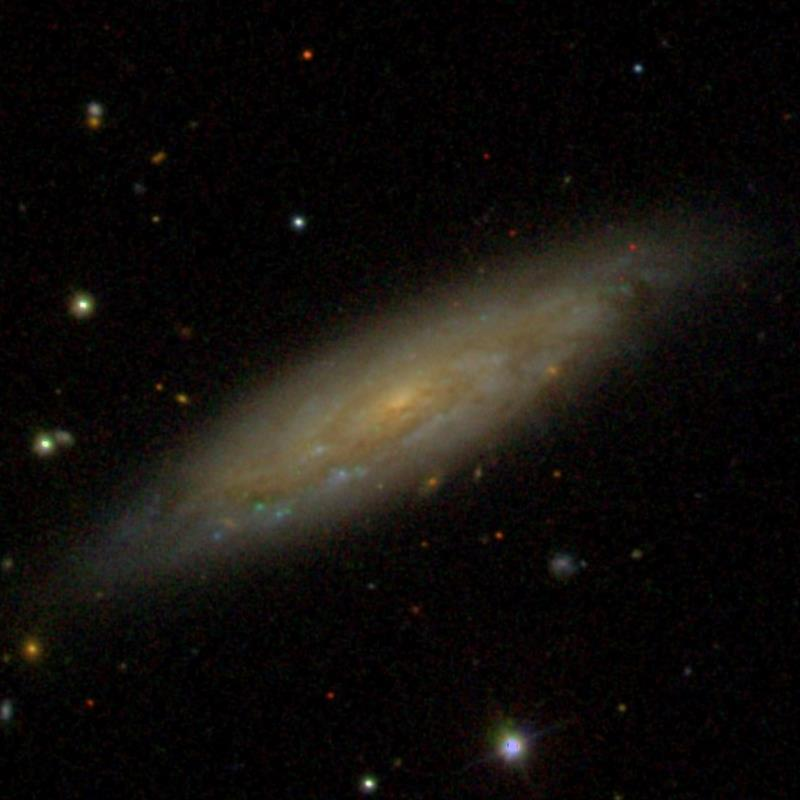
NGC 3972 by the Sloan Digital Sky Survey

== See also ==
- List of NGC objects (3001–4000)
