= NGC 3913 =

Galaxy in the constellation Ursa Major

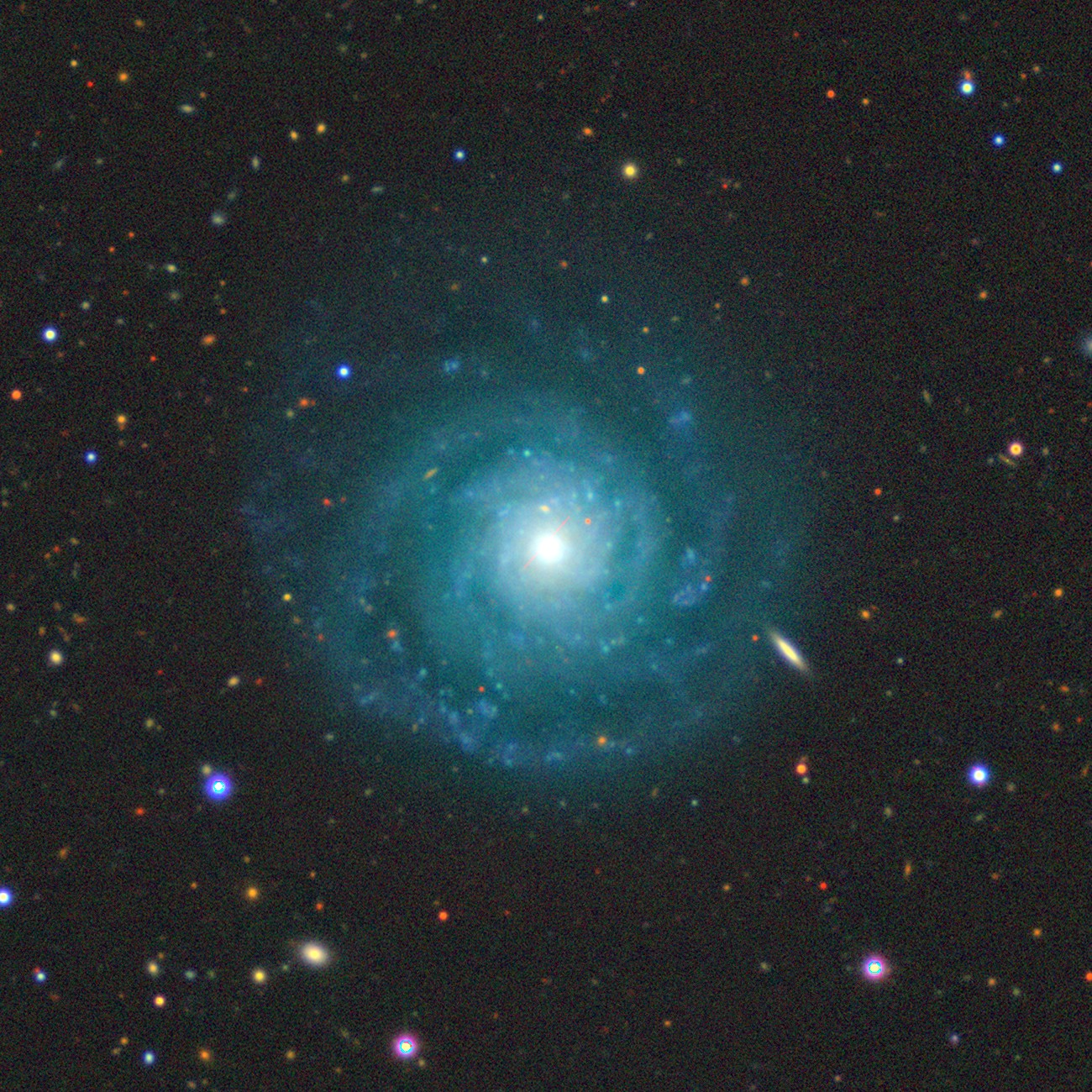
- NGC 3913 imaged by Legacy Surveys

Observation data (J2000 epoch)
- Constellation: Ursa Major
- Right ascension: 11^{h} 50^{m} 38.9222^{s}
- Declination: +55° 21′ 13.942″
- Redshift: 0.003185
- Heliocentric radial velocity: 955±1 km/s
- Distance: 27.06 ± 14.19 Mly (8.297 ± 4.352 Mpc)
- Group or cluster: NGC 3631 Group (LGG 241)
- Apparent magnitude (V): 12.6

Characteristics
- Type: (R')SA(rs)d?
- Size: ~23,600 ly (7.24 kpc) (estimated)
- Apparent size (V): 2.6′ × 2.6′

Other designations
- HOLM 296A, IRAS 11480+5537, IC 740, UGC 6813, MCG +09-20-001, PGC 37024, CGCG 268-092

NGC 3913 is a spiral galaxy in the constellation of Ursa Major. Its velocity with respect to the cosmic microwave background for is 1,124±12 km/s, which corresponds to a Hubble distance of 54.1 ± 3.8 Mly (16.58 ± 1.17 Mpc). However, three non redshift measurements give a much closer distance of 27.06 ± 14.19 Mly (8.297 ± 4.352 Mpc). It was discovered by German-British astronomer William Herschel on 14 April 1785. It was also observed by Lewis Swift on 8 May 1890, which resulted in the galaxy also being listed in the Index Catalogue as IC 740.

The SIMBAD database lists NGC 3913 as an Active Galaxy Nucleus Candidate, i.e. it has a compact region at the center of a galaxy that emits a significant amount of energy across the electromagnetic spectrum, with characteristics indicating that this luminosity is not produced by the stars.

== NGC 3631 Group ==
According to A.M. Garcia, NGC 3913 is part of the NGC 3631 group (also known as LGG 241). This group includes at least 10 galaxies, including NGC 3631, NGC 3657, NGC 3718, NGC 3729, NGC 3972, NGC 3998, UGC 6251, UGC 6446, and UGC 6816.

NGC 3631 is also a member of the M109 Group.

== Supernovae ==
Three supernovae have been observed in NGC 3913:

- SN 1963J (Type Ia, mag. 13.7) was discovered by Fritz Zwicky and Paul Wild on 18 May 1963.
- SN 1979B (Type Ia, mag. 16) was discovered by Leonida Rosino on 28 February 1979.
- SN 2026dix (Type IIb, mag. 16.2) was discovered by the MASTER program on 16 February 2026.

== Image gallery ==
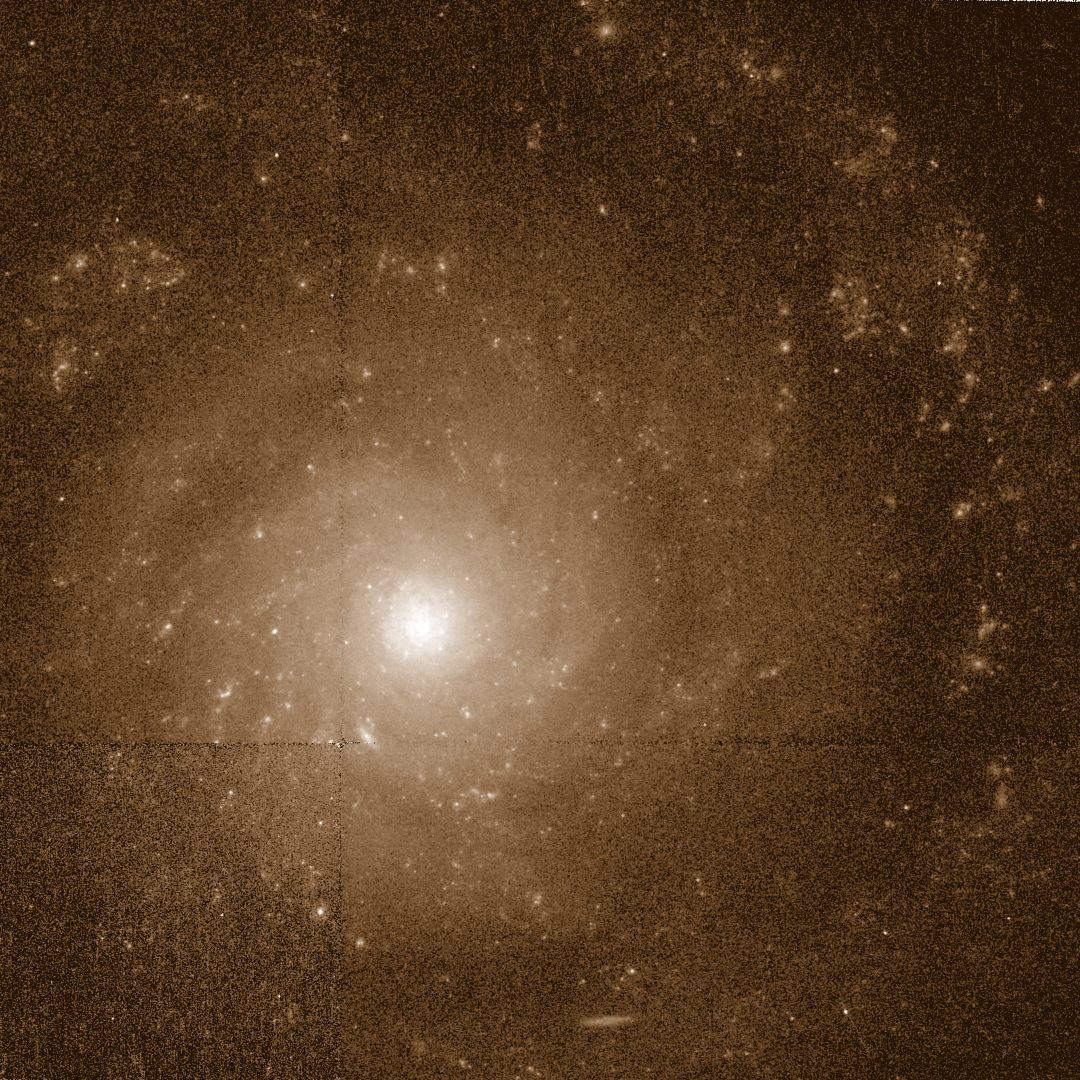
NGC 3913 imaged by the Hubble Space Telescope

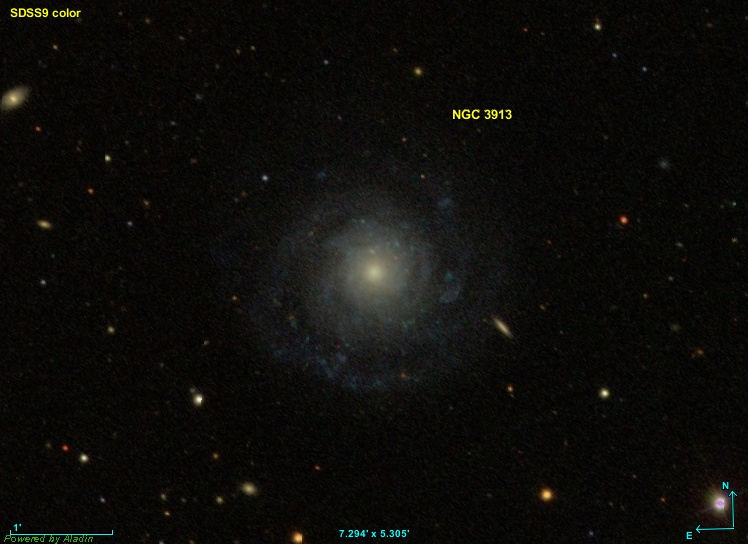
NGC 3913 imaged by SDSS

== See also ==
- List of NGC objects (3001–4000)
