= NGC 3631 =

Galaxy in the constellation Ursa Major

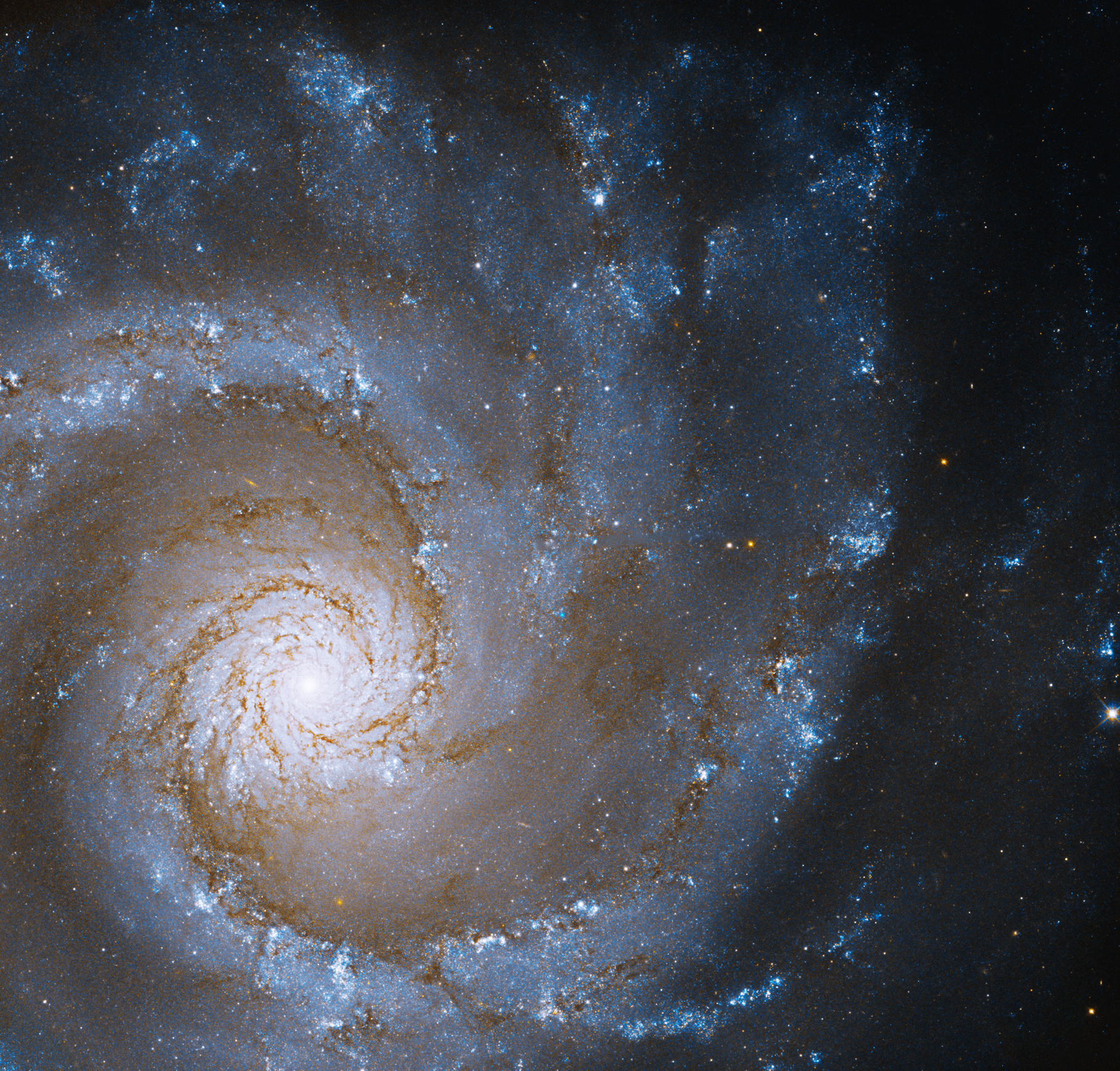
- NGC 3631 imaged by the Hubble Space Telescope

Observation data (J2000 epoch)
- Constellation: Ursa Major
- Right ascension: 11^{h} 21^{m} 02.8753^{s}
- Declination: +53° 10′ 11.038″
- Redshift: 0.003839
- Heliocentric radial velocity: 1,151±1 km/s
- Distance: 33.7 ± 17.7 Mly (10.3 ± 5.4 Mpc)
- Group or cluster: NGC 3631 Group (LGG 241)
- Apparent magnitude (V): 10.1

Characteristics
- Type: SA(s)c
- Size: ~56,700 ly (17.39 kpc) (estimated)
- Apparent size (V): 5.0′ × 3.7′

Other designations
- Arp 27, UGC 6360, MCG +09-19-047, PGC 34767, VV 363

NGC 3631 is a spiral galaxy located in the northern constellation of Ursa Major. It is located at a distance of about 35 million light years from Earth, which, given its apparent dimensions, means that NGC 3631 is about 60,000 light years across. This galaxy was discovered by the German-British astronomer William Herschel on April 14, 1789. It is a grand design spiral galaxy seen face on.

== Characteristics ==
NGC 3631 is a grand design spiral galaxy and features two principal spiral arms, which begin near the center. The two main arms branch into secondary arms with lower surface brightness. The galaxy shows moderate-to-high star formation rate and bright HII regions are present in all the arms. The star formation rate of the galaxy is 4.6 M_{☉} per year. Halton Arp observed "straight arms", and an "absorption tube crossing from inside to outside of southern arm" and added the galaxy to his Atlas of Peculiar Galaxies. At inclination of 17 degrees, the galaxy is seen nearly face on.

The HI imaging shows the spiral arms distinguished well and HI is also detected in most of the interarm regions. The atomic hydrogen is detected mostly within the limits of the optical disc but also extends one and a half times the radius of the optical disk. The hydrogen forms streaming motions near the spiral arms. The gas features two anticyclonic and four cyclonic vortices, rotating with the spiral pattern. The anticyclones are caused by the differential rotation and the cyclones are the result of a high amplitude in the density wave. The centres of the anticyclones are located between the observed spiral arms and the cyclones lie close to the observed spirals.

NGC 3631 has weak diffuse X-ray emission. There are six candidates ultraluminous X-ray sources in disk of the galaxy, two which have an optical counterpart. The nucleus of the galaxy hosts a supermassive black hole with mass 10^{7.4} (25 million) M_{☉}, based on Ks bulge luminosity.

== Supernovae ==
Four supernovae have been discovered in NGC 3631:

- SN 1964A (type unknown, mag. 17) was discovered by Paul Wild on 4 February 1964.
- SN 1965L (type unknown, mag. 16) was discovered by Paul Wild on 25 September 1965. (Note: Some sources incorrectly list the discovery date as 29 September 1965.)
- SN 1996bu (Type II, mag. 17.3) was discovered by Reiki Kushida on 14 November 1996.
- SN 2016bau (Type Ib, mag. 17.8) was discovered by Ron Arbour on 13 March 2016, before it reached maximum light. It was also observed in radio waves by the VLA as a radio source with a flux density of 1.0 ± 0.03 mJy at 8.6 GHz.

== Nearby galaxies and group ==
NGC 3631 forms a small group with NGC 3657, which is part of the north Ursa Major groups, which is part of the Ursa Major Cloud, which is part of the Virgo Supercluster.

According to A.M. Garcia, NGC 3631 is part of the NGC 3631 galaxy group (also known as LGG 241). This group includes at least 10 galaxies, including NGC 3657, NGC 3718, NGC 3729, NGC 3913, NGC 3972, NGC 3998, UGC 6251, UGC 6446, and UGC 6816.

== Gallery ==
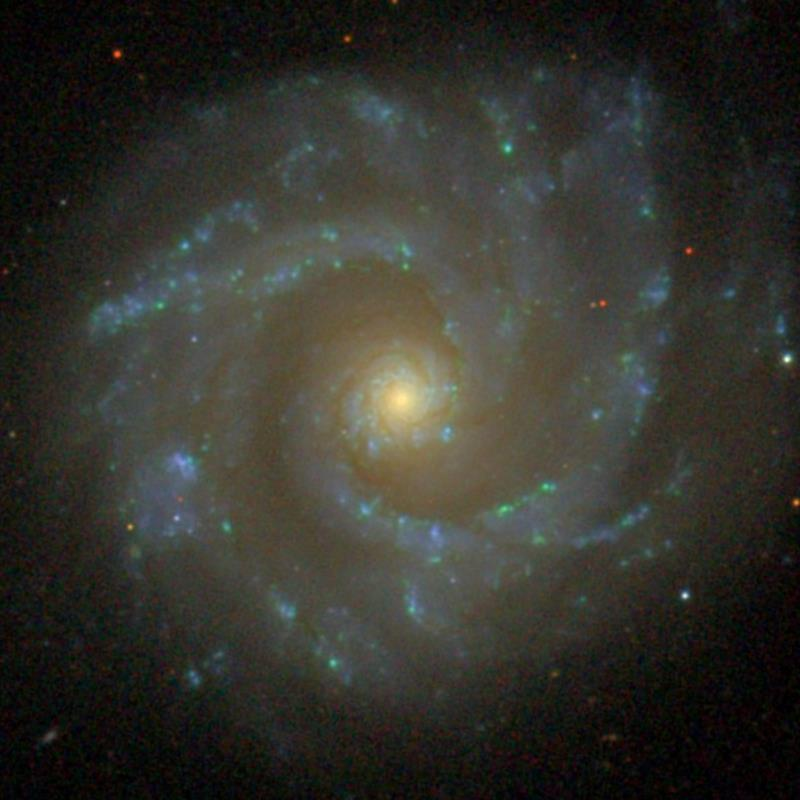
NGC 3631 (SDSS DR14)

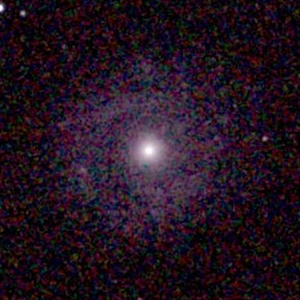
NGC 3631 by 2MASS

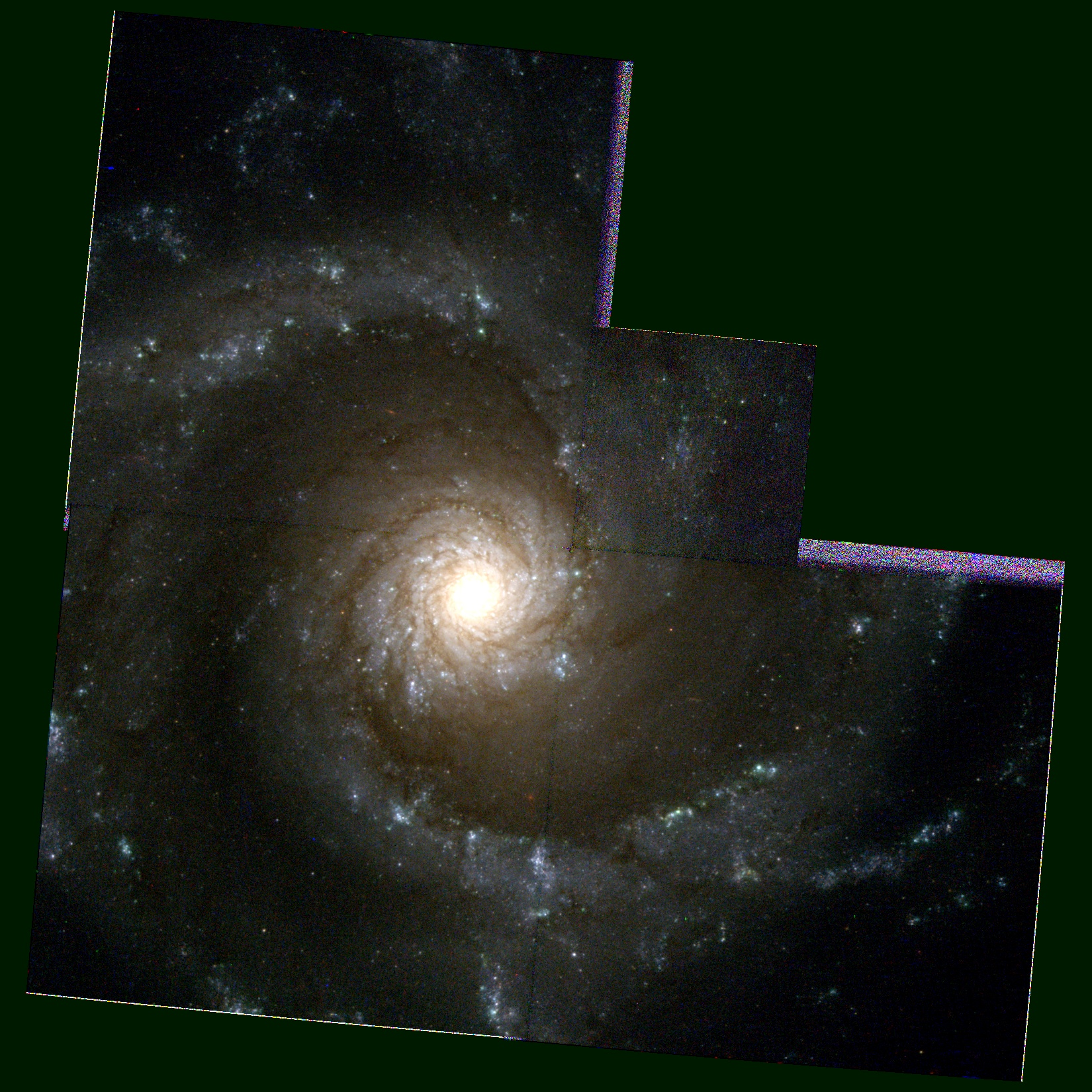
HST image of NGC 3631.

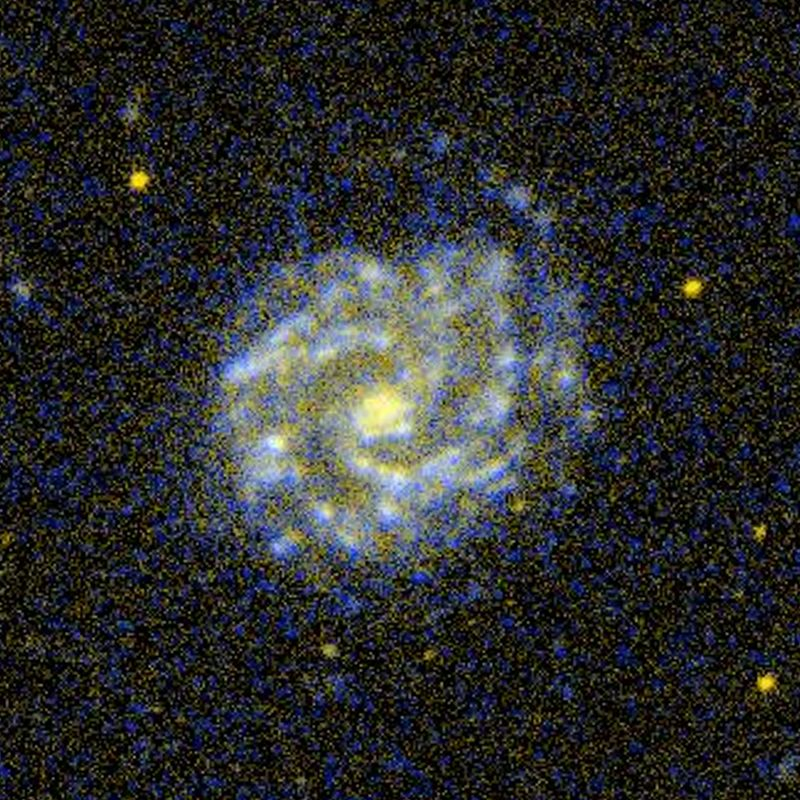
NGC 3631 by GALEX
