= NGC 3916 =

Galaxy in the constellation Ursa Major

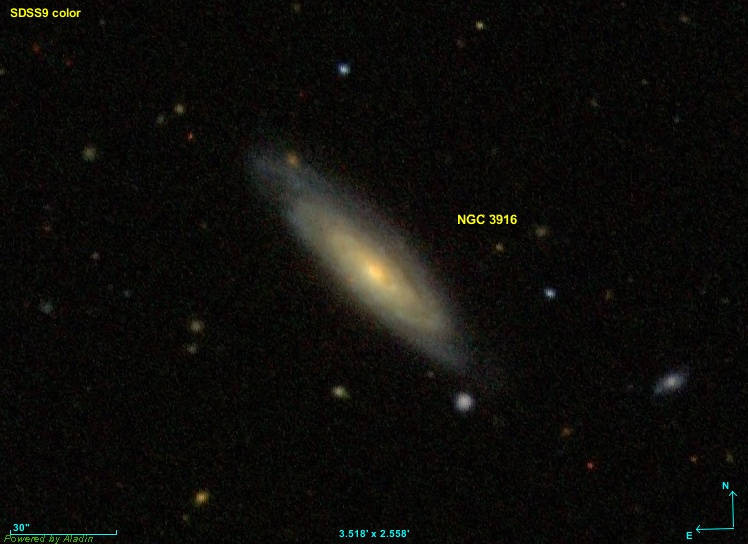
- NGC 3916 imaged by SDSS

Observation data (J2000 epoch)
- Constellation: Ursa Major
- Right ascension: 11^{h} 50^{m} 51.0192^{s}
- Declination: +55° 08′ 37.290″
- Redshift: 0.019185±0.00000309
- Heliocentric radial velocity: 5,751±1 km/s
- Distance: 284.9 ± 20.0 Mly (87.34 ± 6.12 Mpc)
- Group or cluster: LDC 846
- Apparent magnitude (V): 14.2g

Characteristics
- Type: SAb edge-on
- Size: ~137,900 ly (42.28 kpc) (estimated)
- Apparent size (V): 1.47′ × 0.48′

Other designations
- IRAS 11481+5525, 2MASX J11505098+5508372, UGC 6819, MCG +09-20-005, PGC 037047, CGCG 268-094

NGC 3916 is a spiral galaxy in the constellation of Ursa Major. Its velocity with respect to the cosmic microwave background is 5,922±12 km/s, which corresponds to a Hubble distance of 284.9 ± 20.0 Mly (87.34 ± 6.12 Mpc). It was discovered by German-British astronomer William Herschel on 14 April 1789.

NGC 3916 is a LINER galaxy, i.e. a galaxy whose nucleus has an emission spectrum characterized by broad lines of weakly ionized atoms. NGC 3916 is also a radio galaxy, i.e. it has giant regions of radio emission extending well beyond its visible structure.

== Galaxy group ==
NGC 3916 belongs to a small galaxy group known as LDC 846. The other two galaxies in the group are NGC 3921 and NGC 3977.

== Supernova ==
One supernova has been observed in NGC 3916:

- SN 1974D (type unknown, mag. 15.5) was discovered by Miklós Lovas on 20 March 1974.

== See also ==
- List of NGC objects (3001–4000)
