= SN 2011by =

Supernova in the galaxy NGC 3972

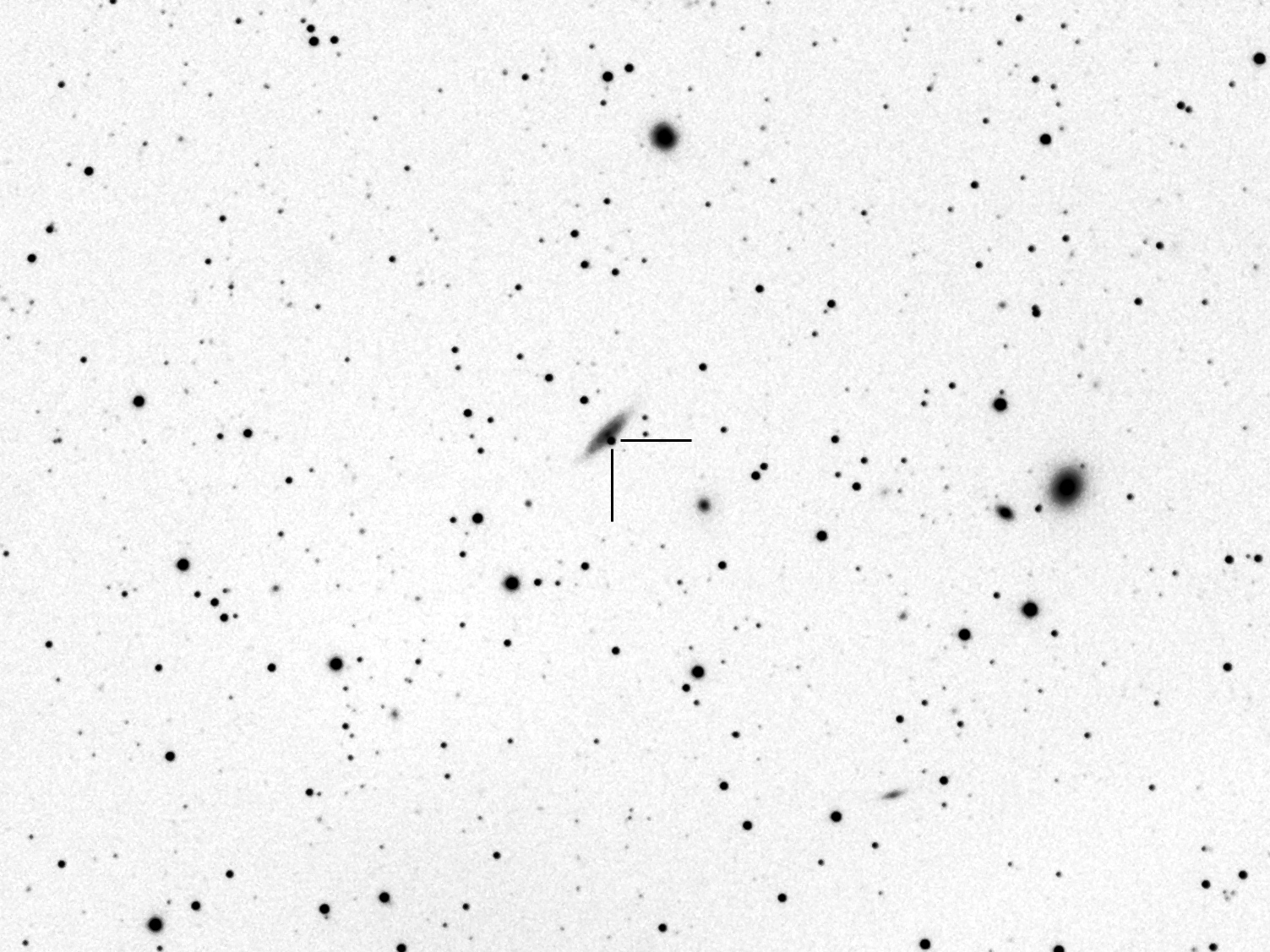
- Image from Richie Jarvis
- Event type: Supernova
- Type Ia
- Discovered: April 26, 2011 (UTC)
- Constellation: Ursa Major
- Right ascension: 11^{h} 55^{m} 45.56^{s}
- Declination: +55° 19′ 33.8″
- Epoch: J2000
- Redshift: 0.003402 ±5e-06
- Host: NGC 3972
- Peak apparent magnitude: < 12
- Other designations: SN 2011by

SN 2011by was a supernova in NGC 3972. It was a Type Ia supernova, discovered by Zhangwei Jin and Xing Gao (China). SN 2011by is about 5.3" east and 19.1" north of the center of NGC 3972.
