= NGC 3977 =

Galaxy in the constellation Ursa Major

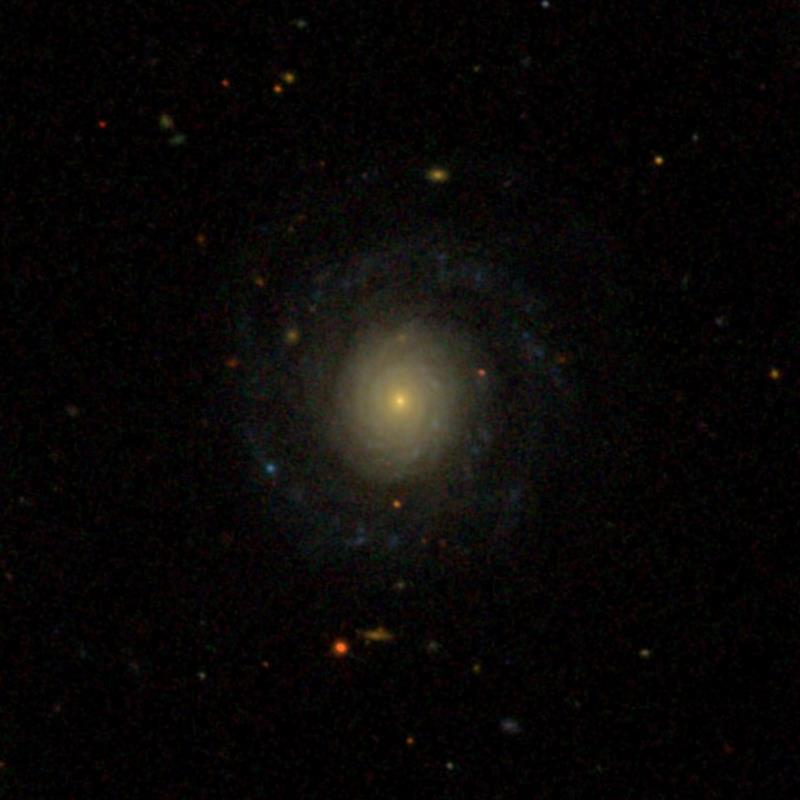
- NGC 3977 imaged by SDSS

Observation data (J2000 epoch)
- Constellation: Ursa Major
- Right ascension: 11^{h} 56^{m} 07.1952^{s}
- Declination: +55° 23′ 26.718″
- Redshift: 0.019370
- Heliocentric radial velocity: 5,807±5 km/s
- Distance: 287.4 ± 20.1 Mly (88.13 ± 6.17 Mpc)
- Group or cluster: Holm 304
- Apparent magnitude (V): 13.4

Characteristics
- Type: (R)SA(rs)ab?
- Size: ~156,600 ly (48.00 kpc) (estimated)
- Apparent size (V): 1.5′ × 1.4′

Other designations
- HOLM 304B, NGC 3980, UGC 6909, MCG +09-20-034, PGC 37497, CGCG 269-017

NGC 3977 is an unbarred spiral galaxy in the constellation of Ursa Major. Its velocity with respect to the cosmic microwave background is 5,975±13 km/s, which corresponds to a Hubble distance of 287.4 ± 20.1 Mly (88.13 ± 6.17 Mpc). It was discovered by German-British astronomer William Herschel on 13 April 1784. It was also observed by Lewis Swift on 16 April 1885, causing this galaxy to be listed twice in the New General Catalogue, as both NGC 3977 and NGC 3980.

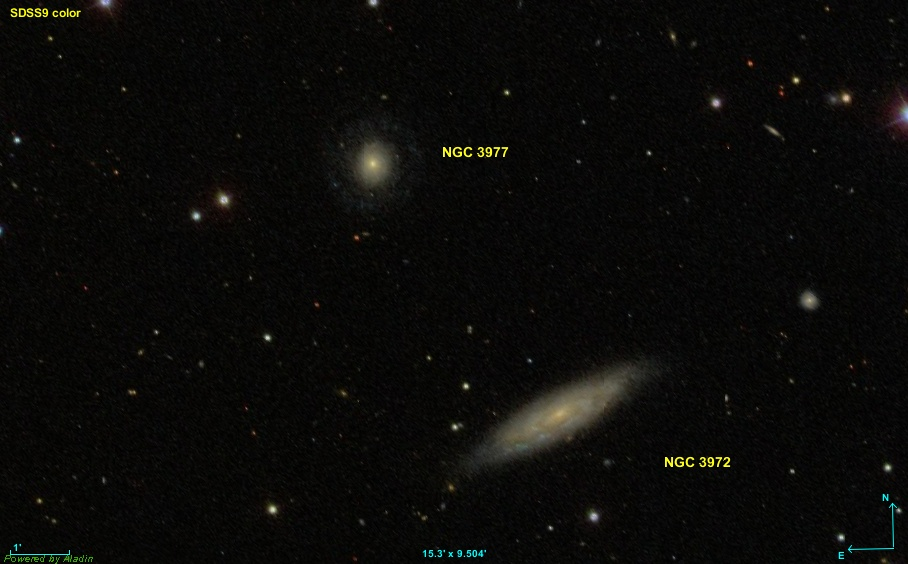
NGC 3977 with NGC 3972

NGC 3977 along with NGC 3972 are listed together as Holm 304 in Erik Holmberg's A Study of Double and Multiple Galaxies Together with Inquiries into some General Metagalactic Problems, published in 1937. This grouping is purely optical, as NGC 3977 is about four times farther away than NGC 3972.

The SIMBAD database lists NGC 3977 as a LINER galaxy, i.e. a galaxy whose nucleus has an emission spectrum characterized by broad lines of weakly ionized atoms.

== Supernovae ==
Two supernovae have been observed in NGC 3977:

- SN 1946A (type unknown, mag. 18) was discovered by Edwin Hubble in May 1946.
- SN 2006gs (Type II, mag. 17.0) was discovered by Kōichi Itagaki on 22 September 2006.

== See also ==
- List of NGC objects (3001–4000)
