= NGC 3657 =

Peculiar spiral galaxy

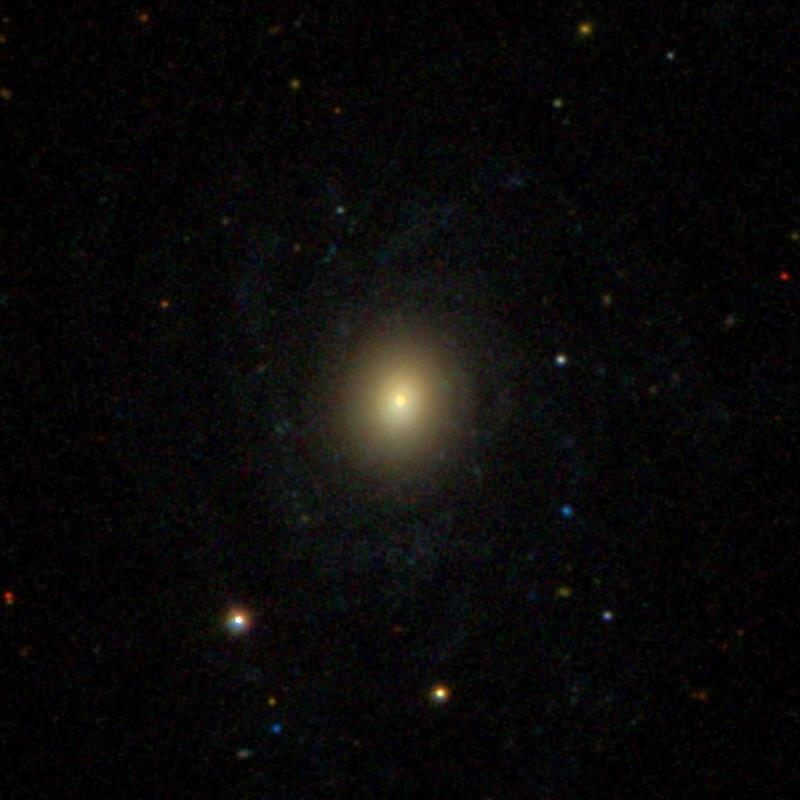
- SDSS image of NGC 3657.

Observation data (2000.0 epoch)
- Constellation: Ursa Major
- Right ascension: 11^{h} 23^{m} 55.6^{s}
- Declination: 52° 55′ 15″
- Redshift: 0.004059
- Heliocentric radial velocity: 1217 km/s
- Distance: 63 Mly (19.2 Mpc)
- Apparent magnitude (V): 13.5
- Absolute magnitude (B): -21.23

Characteristics
- Type: SAB(rs)c pec
- Mass: 4.6×10^{9} (Stellar mass) M_{☉}
- Size: ~136,600 ly (41.88 kpc) (estimated)
- Apparent size (V): 1.03 × 0.79

Other designations
- UGC 06406, CGCG 268-030, MCG +09-19-065, PGC 035002

NGC 3657 is a peculiar spiral galaxy located approximately 63 million light-years away in the constellation Ursa Major. It was discovered April 12, 1789 by William Herschel. NGC 3657 is a member of the NGC 3631 Group which is part of the Ursa Major Cloud.

NGC 3657 has a huge ultraviolet extended disk revealed by the GALEX space telescope which suggests that NGC 3657 contains an extended HI reservoir. The galaxy has an unusually low ratio of the mass of dust (M_{dust}) to the mass of neutral atomic hydrogen (M_{HI}) with its extended HI reservoir where star formation is not observed. This indicates that NGC 3657 has either only recently accreted gas from the outside environment or the HI gas in the galaxy has insufficient density to collapse and form stars.

The galaxy hosts a supermassive black hole with an estimated mass of 4.3 × 10^{6} M_{☉}.

== See also ==
- List of NGC objects (3001–4000)
- NGC 3631
