= NGC 3718 =

Barred Spiral or Lenticular galaxy in the constellation Ursa Major

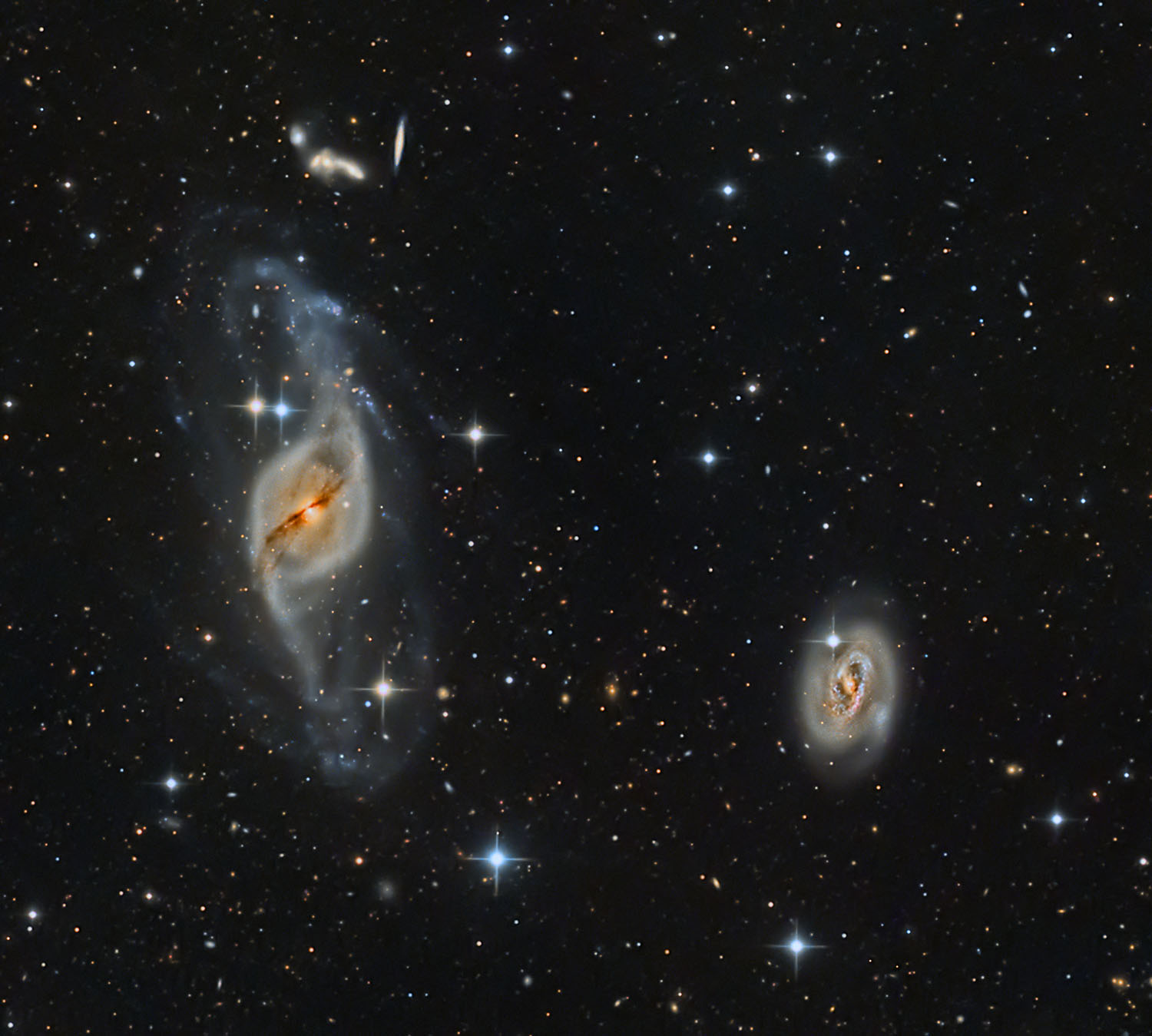
- NGC 3718 (left) with its companion, NGC 3729

Observation data (J2000.0 epoch)
- Constellation: Ursa Major
- Right ascension: 11^{h} 32^{m} 34.940^{s}
- Declination: +53° 04′ 04.18″
- Redshift: 0.003306
- Distance: 47.84 ± 8.54 Mly (14.667 ± 2.618 Mpc)
- Apparent magnitude (V): 10.61

Characteristics
- Type: SB(s)a pec
- Size: 153.1 kly (46.93 kpc)
- Apparent size (V): 2.940′ × 2.352′

Other designations
- Arp 214, UGC 6524, MCG+09-19-114, PGC 35616

NGC 3718, also called Arp 214, is a galaxy located approximately 52 million light years from Earth in the constellation Ursa Major. Near NGC 3718 is the galaxy NGC 3729, a peculiar barred spiral galaxy. It is either a lenticular or spiral galaxy.

NGC 3718 exhibits a warped, S-shape similar to NGC 6872, and has a prominent dust lane obscuring the central bulge. The innermost disc of gas follows the dust lane has a polar orbit around NGC 3718's center, making it a polar-ring galaxy. NGC 3718 is thought to represent an early stage in the evolution of polar-ring galaxies. The unique morphology may be a result of gravitational interaction with NGC 3729, another spiral galaxy located 150,000 light-years away.

The Hickson Compact Group 56 can be seen south of one of NGC 3718's spiral arms. HCG 56 is eight times farther away than NGC 3718 and NGC 3729.

NGC 3718 is a member of the Ursa Major Cluster.

== Hickson Compact Group ==
South of NGC 3718 the Hickson Compact Group #56 is located. HCG 56 is a compact group of galaxies of which 4 members are interacting with each other. This group is about 120 Mpc distant to our galaxy, which is about 8 times more distant than NGC 3718. The edge on galaxy is not actually part of the group, but slightly farther back. The 4 merging galaxies are expected to merge into one big elliptical galaxy.

== Gallery ==
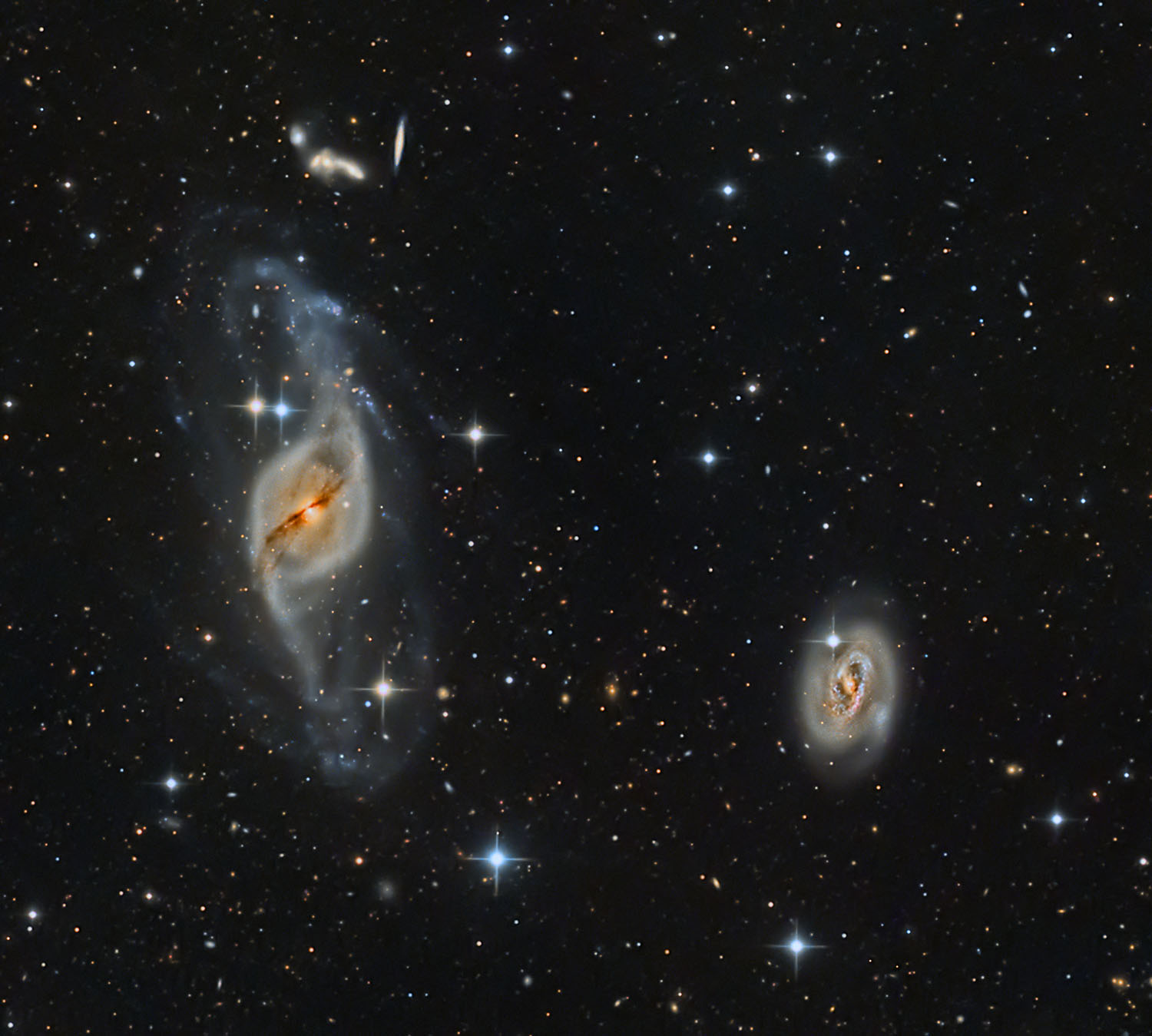
NGC 3718 and its companion NGC 3729.

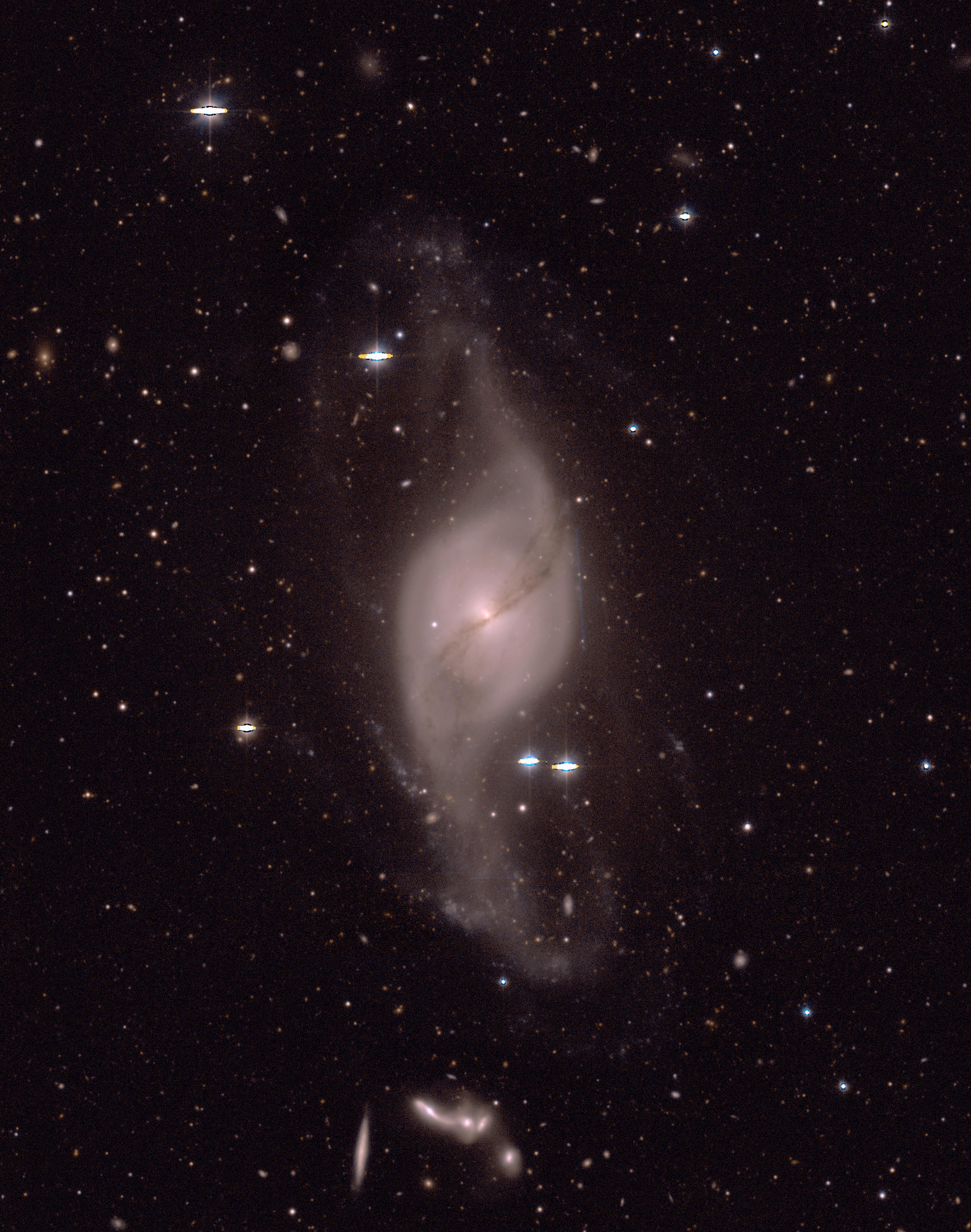
NGC 3718 and HCG 56 with the legacy surveys

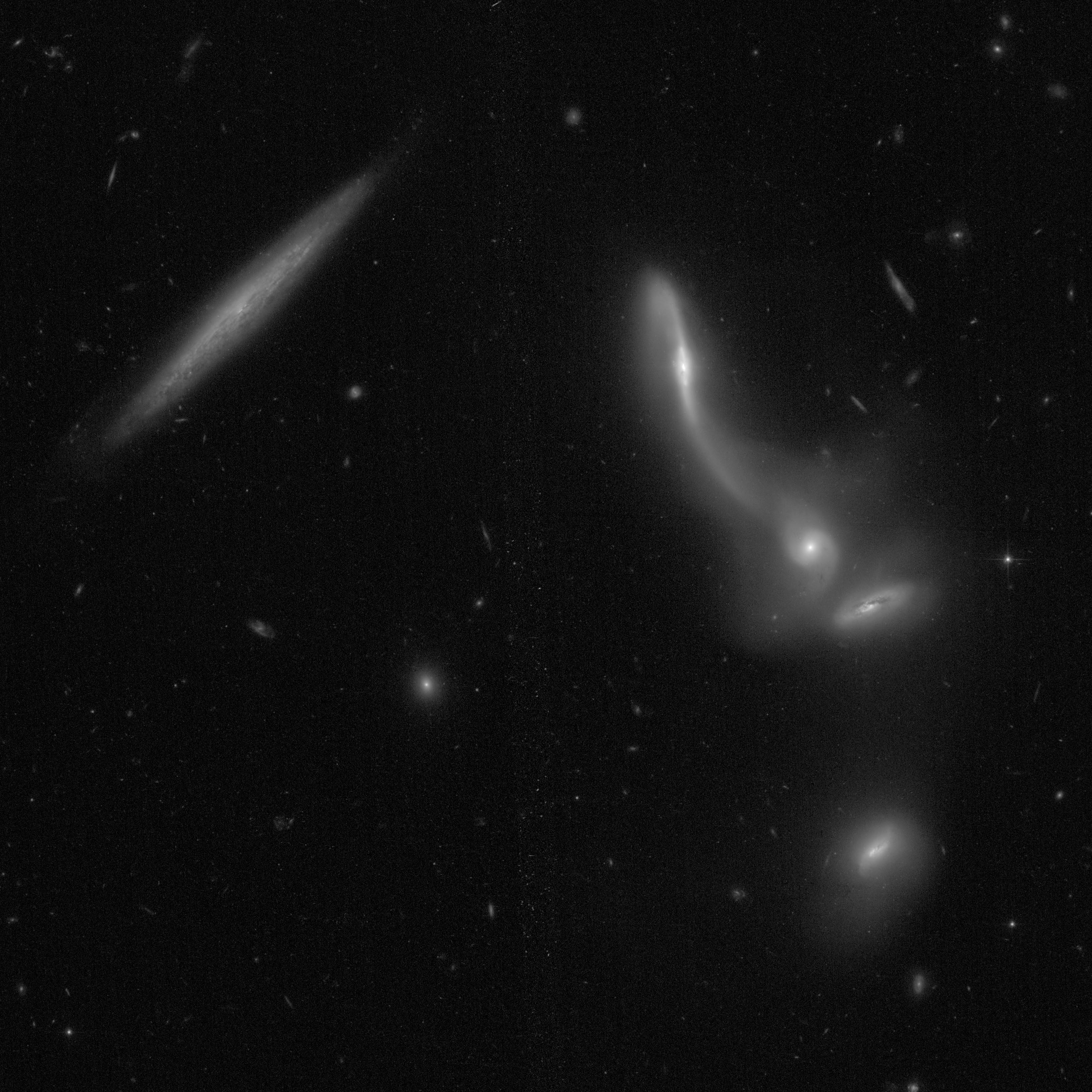
The Hickson Compact Group #56 with Hubble
