= NGC 3729 =

Galaxy in the constellation of Ursa Major

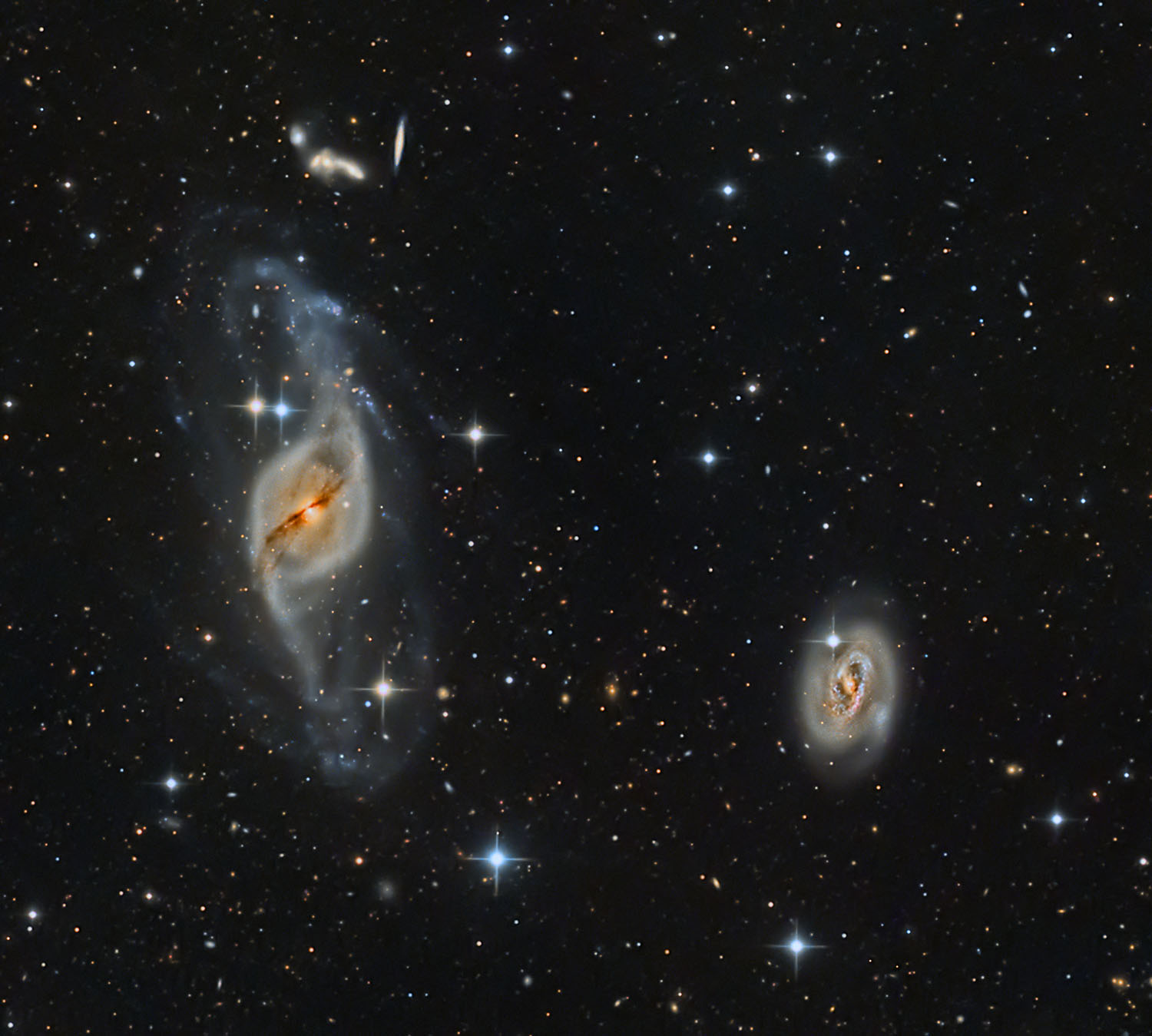
- NGC 3729 is the galaxy on the right. NGC 3718 is on the left side. Near the top of NGC 3718, Hickson Compact Group 56 can be spotted

Observation data (J2000 epoch)
- Constellation: Ursa Major
- Right ascension: 11^{h} 33^{m} 49.3^{s}
- Declination: 53° 07′ 32″
- Redshift: 1,060±1 km/s
- Distance: 65.7 ± 4.8 Mly (20.1 ± 1.5 Mpc)
- Apparent magnitude (V): 11.0 or 11.4

Characteristics
- Type: SB(r)a pec
- Apparent size (V): 2.9′ × 1.9′

Other designations
- NGC 3729, UGC 6547, MCG +09-19-117, PGC 35711, CGCG 268-051

NGC 3729 is a barred spiral galaxy located in the northern constellation of Ursa Major. It is located at a distance of circa 66 million light years from Earth, which, given its apparent dimensions, means that NGC 3729 is about 60,000 light years across. It was discovered by German-British astronomer William Herschel on April 12, 1789.

NGC 3729 has a bright nucleus embedded in a bar which measures 0.5 x 0.1 arcminutes. At the end of the bar lies a ring with knots. The outer part of the galaxy is formed by an asymmetric faint nebulosity with condensations. It is possible that the condensation is a disturbed satellite galaxy. In the centre of NGC 3729 is predicted to lie an intermediate-mass black hole, whose mass is estimated to be between 4 and 400 thousands M_{☉} (10^{4.6 ± 1.0} M_{☉}) based on Ks-band bulge luminosity. The galaxy has an inner ring which emits in far ultraviolet and H-alpha, which are considered to be markers of recent star formation activity.

NGC 3729 is member of the M109 Group which is part of the south Ursa Major groups, part of the Virgo Supercluster. It forms a pair with NGC 3718, which lies 11.5 arcminutes to the west. It is possible the two galaxies interacted in the past.

Although no supernovae have been observed in NGC 3729 yet, a luminous red nova, designated AT 2018hso (type LRN, mag. 19.41), was discovered by the Zwicky Transient Facility on 31 October 2018.

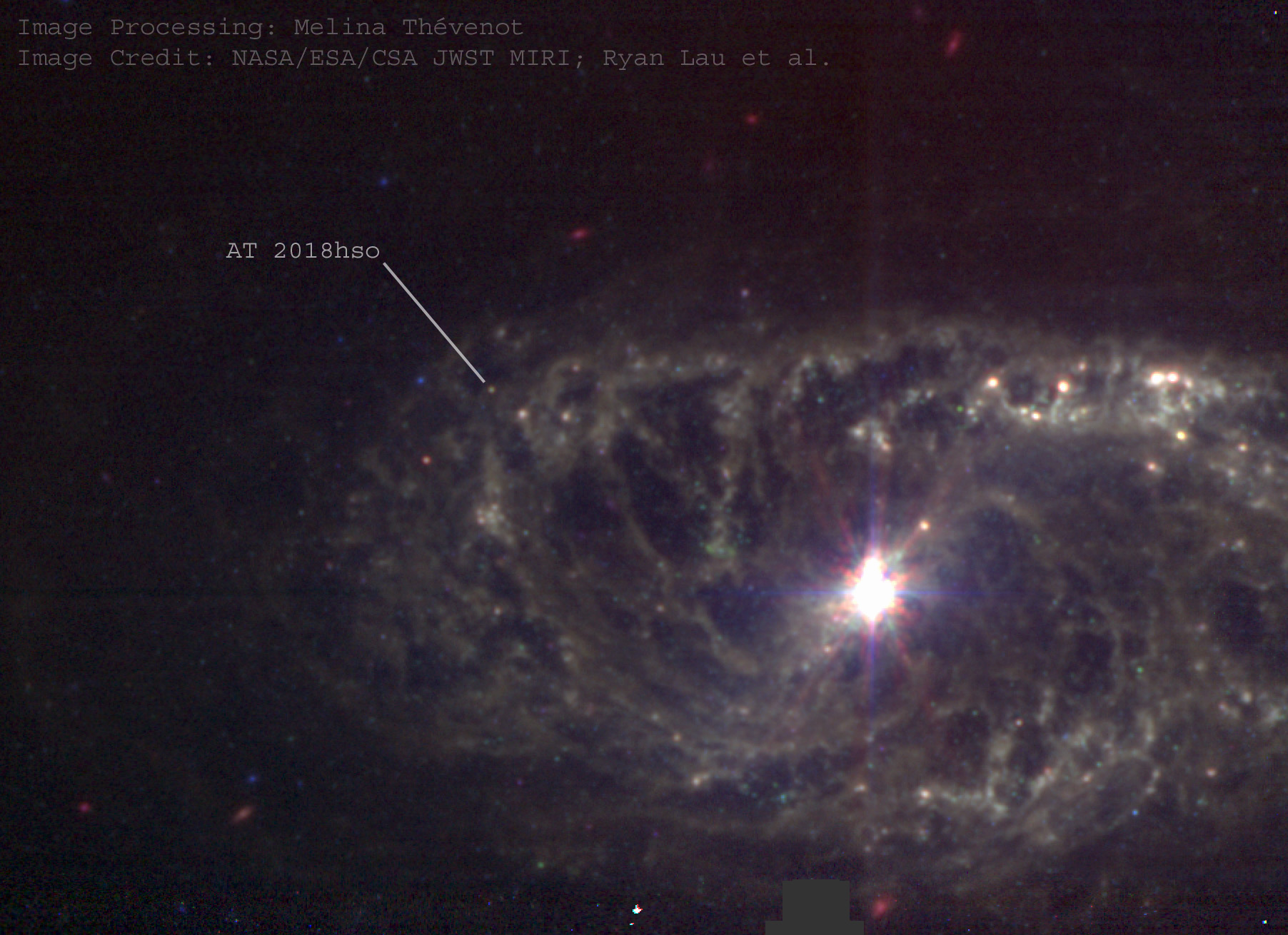
The luminous red nova AT 2018hso with James Webb Space Telescope MIRI
