= Atlas of Peculiar Galaxies =

Catalogue of peculiar galaxies produced by Halton Arp

- Alternative names: Arp number
- Related media on Commons

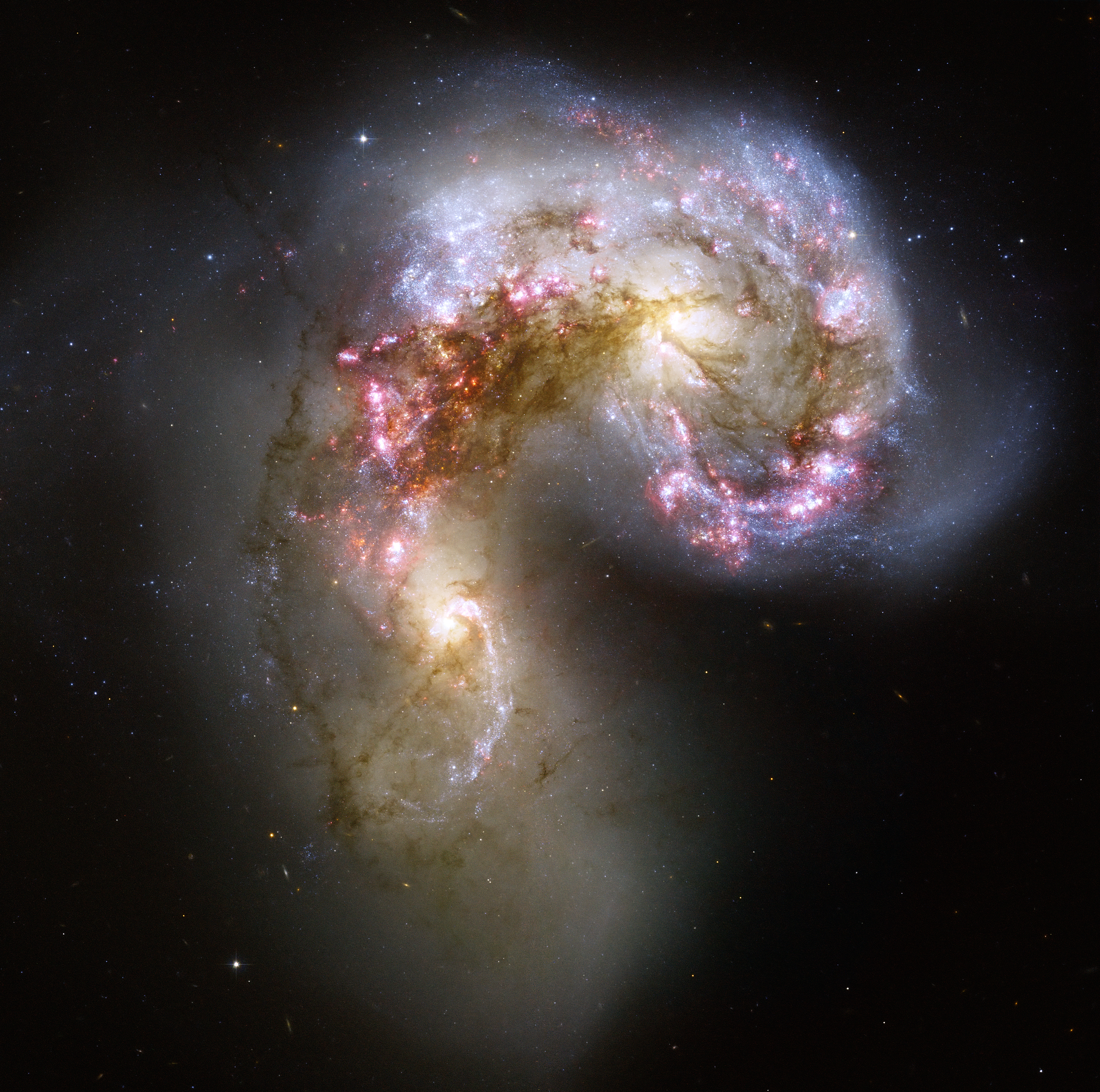
The Antennae Galaxies (Arp 244)

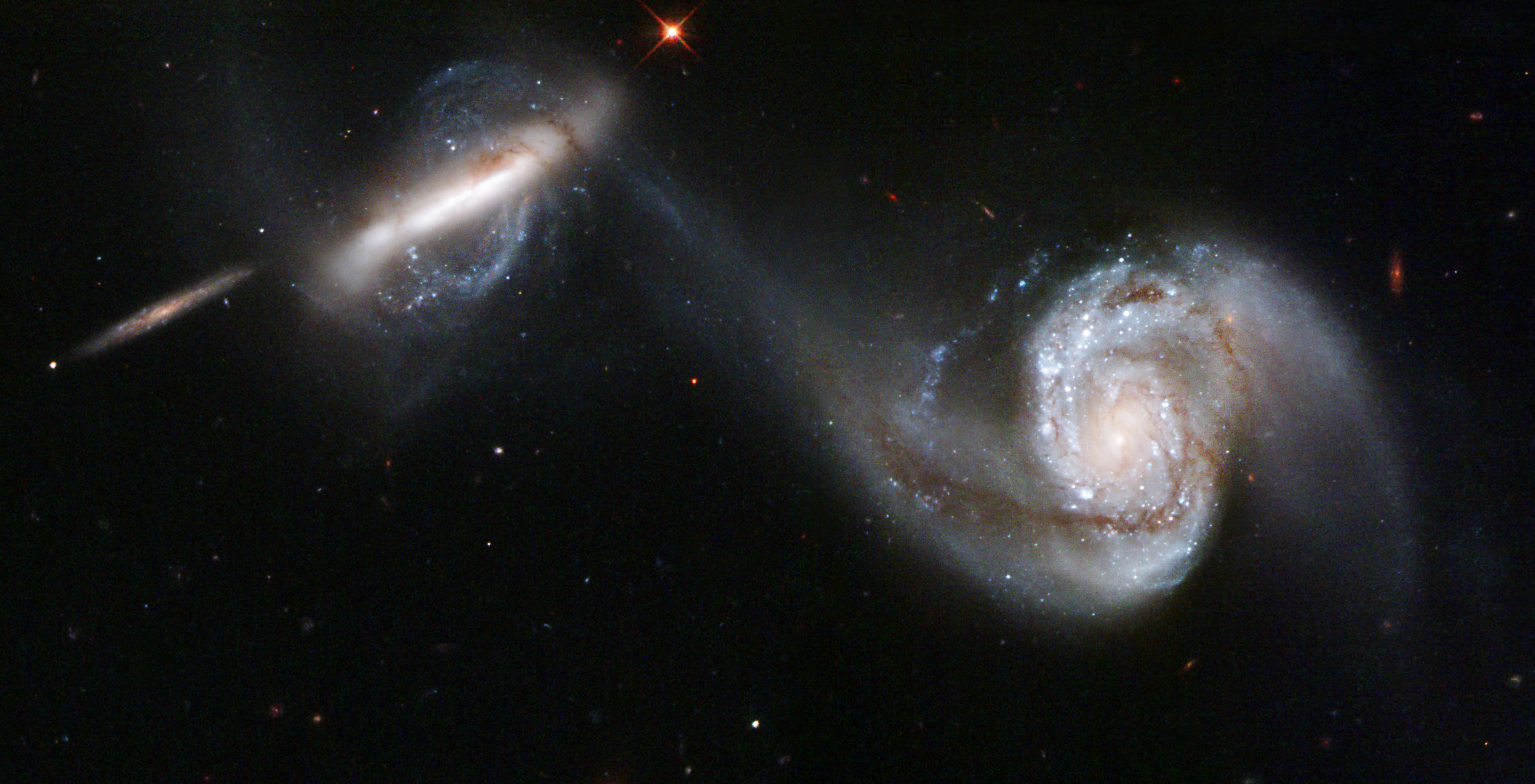
Colliding spiral galaxy pair NGC 3808A and NGC 3808B (Arp 87).

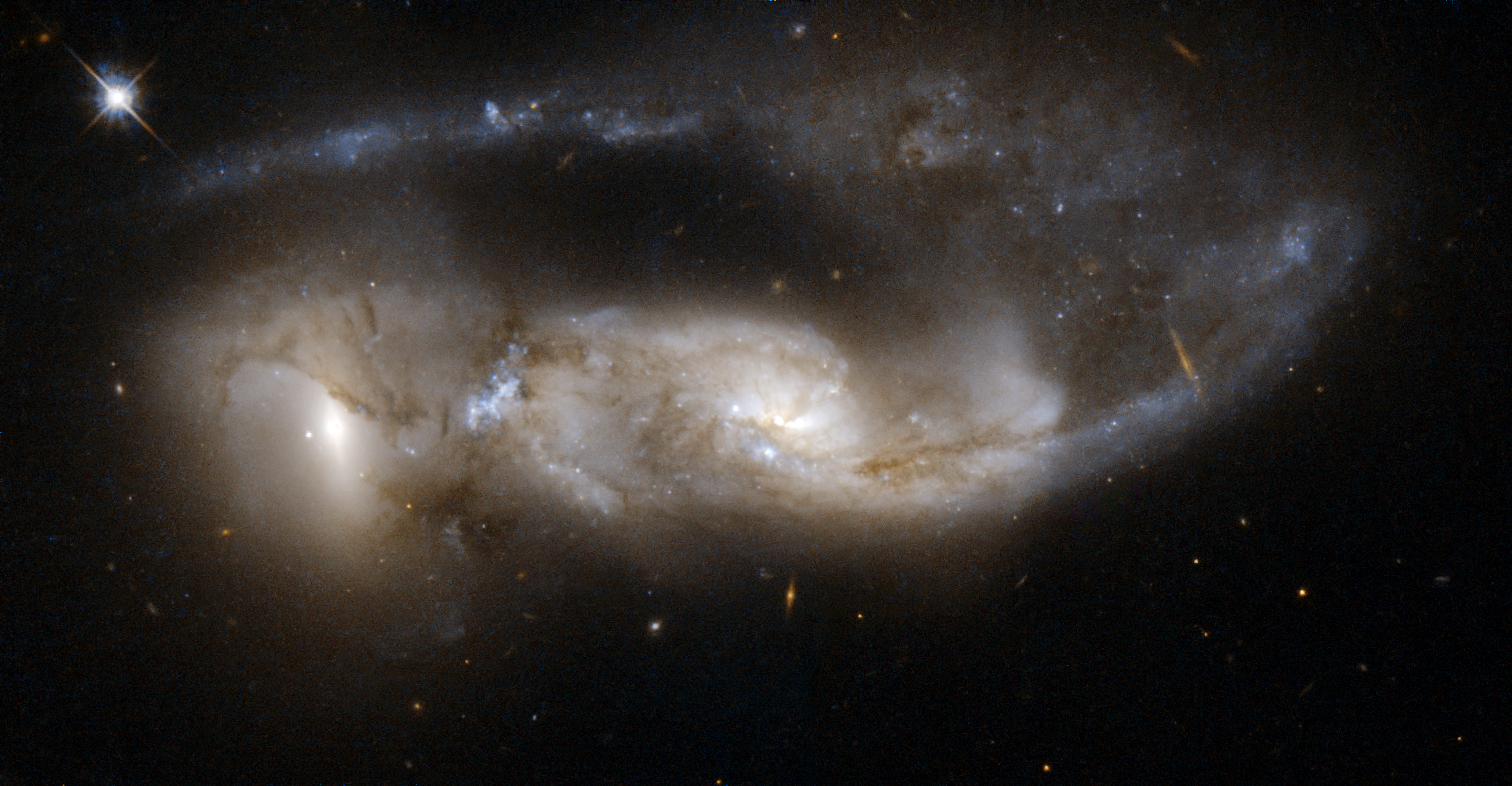
NGC 6621/NGC 6622 (Arp 81), a pair of spiral galaxies 100 million years after their colliding.

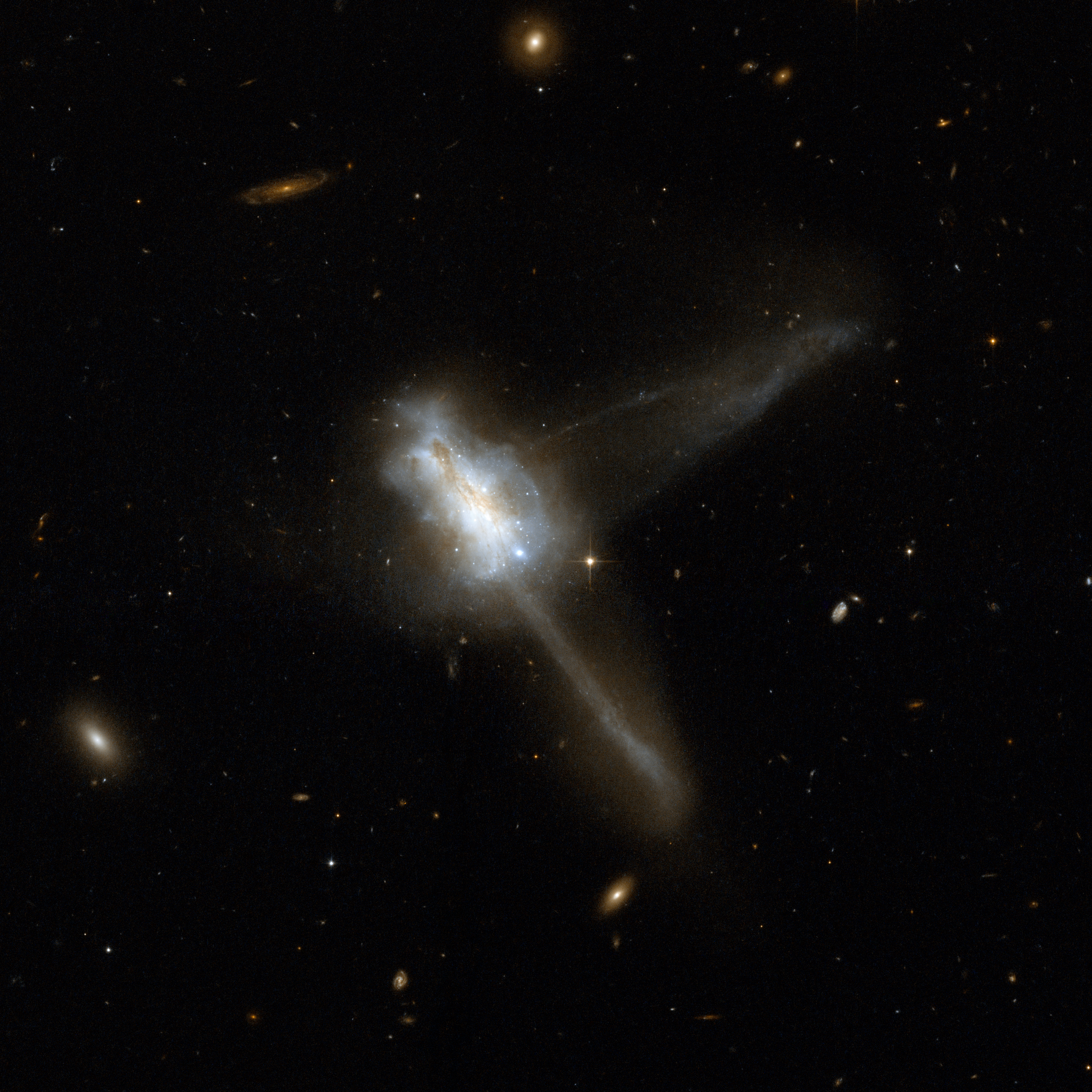
IC 883 (Arp 193), remnant of two galaxies' merger.

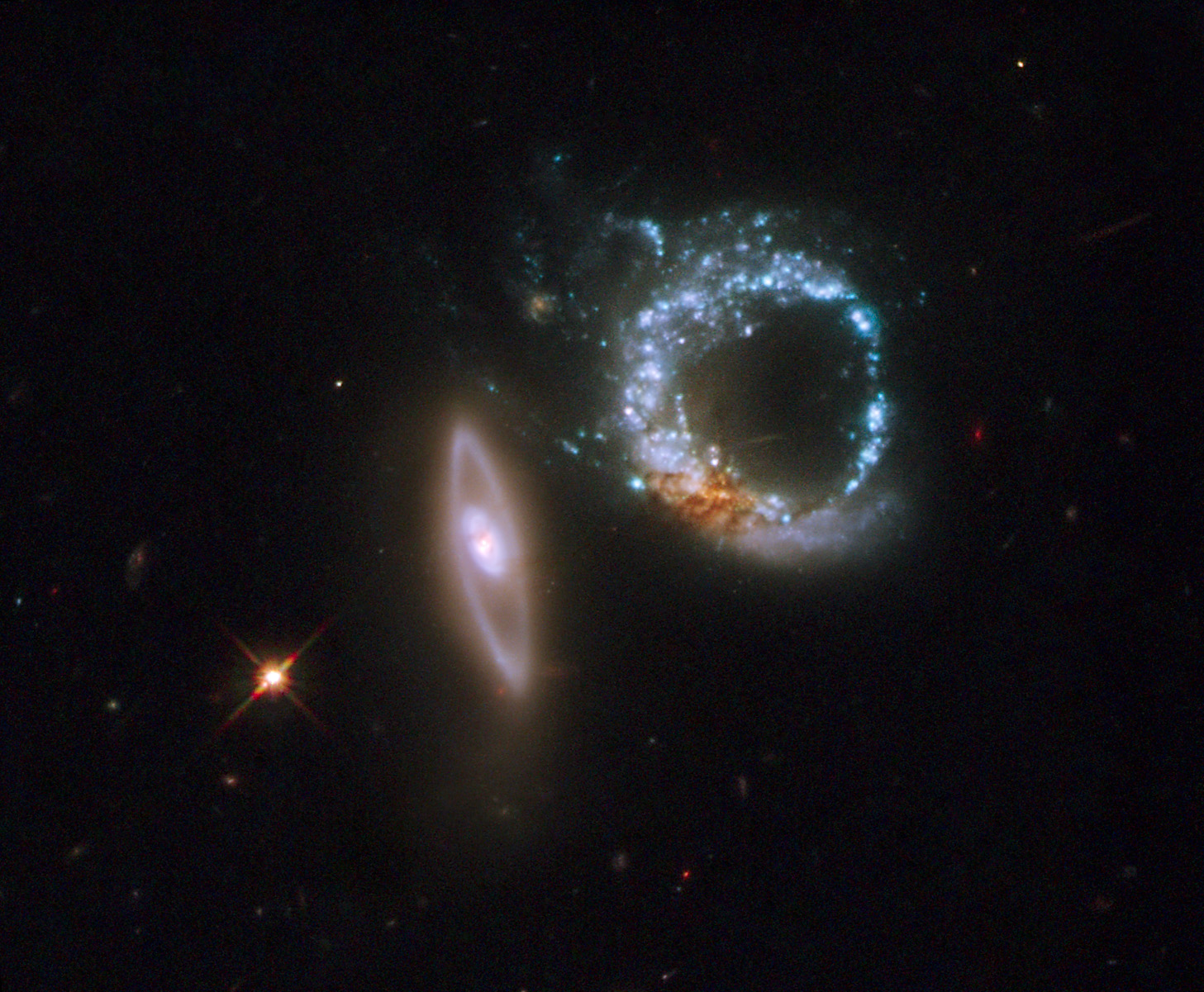
Arp 147, an interacting pair of ring galaxies.

The Atlas of Peculiar Galaxies is a catalog of peculiar galaxies produced by Halton Arp in 1966. A total of 338 galaxies are presented in the atlas, which was originally published in 1966 by the California Institute of Technology. The primary goal of the catalog was to present photographs of examples of the different kinds of peculiar structures found among galaxies.

== Background ==
Arp realized that the reason why galaxies formed into spiral or elliptical shapes was not well understood. He perceived peculiar galaxies as small "experiments" that astronomers could use to understand the physical processes that distort spiral or elliptical galaxies. With this atlas, astronomers had a sample of peculiar galaxies that they could study in more detail. The atlas does not present a complete overview of every peculiar galaxy in the sky but instead provides examples of the different phenomena as observed in nearby galaxies.

Because little was known at the time of publication about the physical processes that caused the different shapes, the galaxies in the atlas are sorted based on their appearance. Objects 1–101 are individual peculiar spiral galaxies or spiral galaxies that apparently have small companions. Objects 102–145 are elliptical and elliptical-like galaxies. Individual or groups of galaxies with neither elliptical nor spiral shapes are listed as objects 146–268. Objects 269–327 are double galaxies. Finally, objects that simply do not fit into any of the above categories are listed as objects 332–338. Most objects are best known by their other designations, but a few galaxies are best known by their Arp numbers (such as Arp 220).

Today, the physical processes that lead to the peculiarities seen in the Arp atlas are better understood than in the 1960s when Arp's book was published. A large number of the objects have been interpreted as interacting galaxies, including M51 (Arp 85), Arp 220, and the Antennae Galaxies (NGC 4038/NGC 4039, or Arp 244). A few of the galaxies are simply dwarf galaxies that do not have enough mass to produce enough gravity to allow the galaxies to form any cohesive structure. NGC 1569 (Arp 210) is an example of one of the dwarf galaxies in the atlas. A few other galaxies are radio galaxies. These objects contain active galactic nuclei that produce powerful jets of gas called radio jets. The atlas includes the nearby radio galaxies M87 (Arp 152) and Centaurus A (Arp 153).

The peculiar associations present in the catalogue are now interpreted as galaxy mergers or non-interacting line-of-sight overlap, though Arp disputed that idea, claiming that apparent associations were examples of ejections.

== Notable Arp galaxies ==
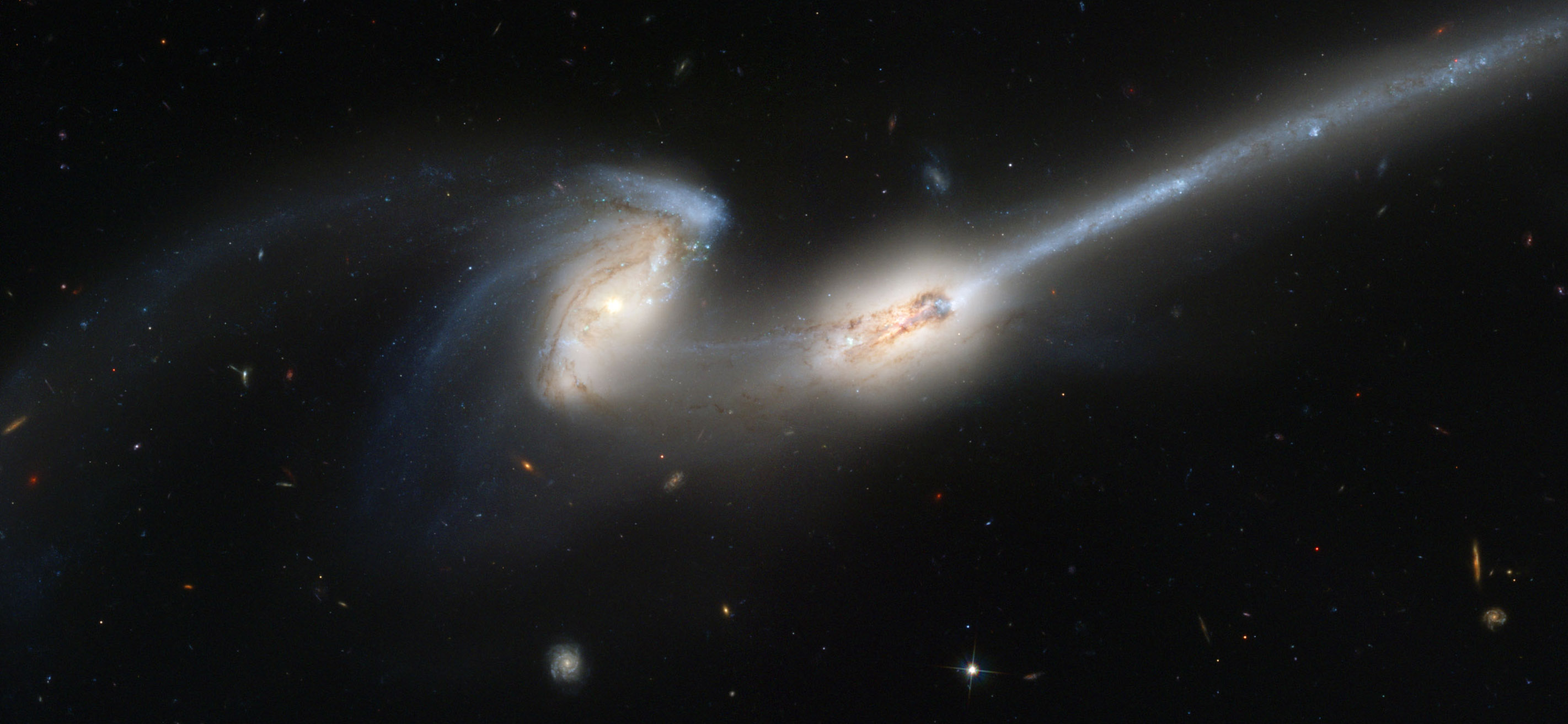
The Mice Galaxies (NGC 4676; Arp 242). These two galaxies both have tidal tails that form as a consequence of the galaxies' gravitational interaction. The galaxies are also connected by a tidal bridge, another feature formed by the gravitational interaction.

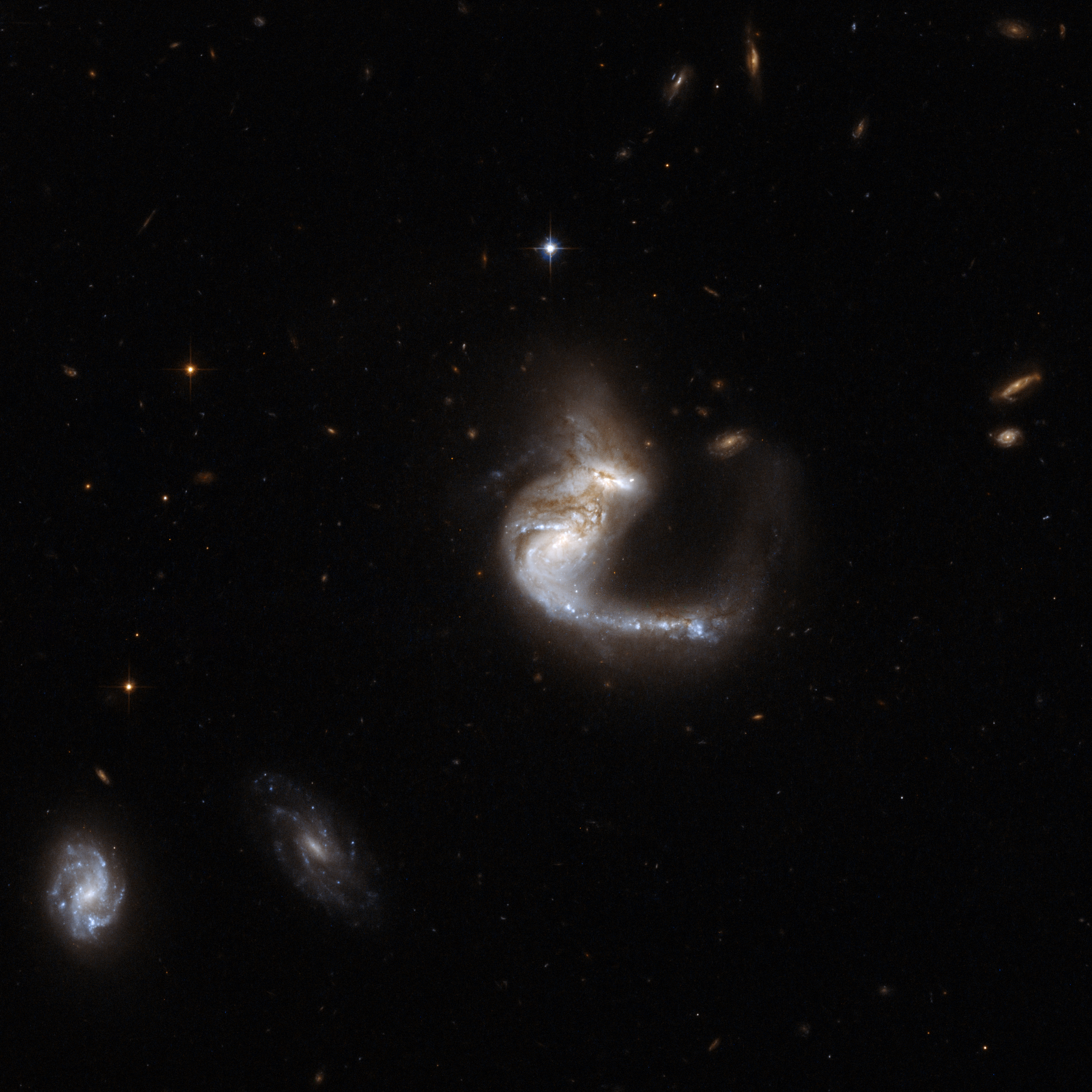
Merging galaxy pair "The Grasshopper" (alias UGC 4881, FUDGE, Arp 55).

Arp Number	Name	Magnitude	Notes
26	Pinwheel Galaxy (M101)	+7.5	spiral galaxy
37	Messier 77	+8.9	radio galaxy
41	NGC 1232	+9.8	spiral galaxy
76	Messier 90	+9.5	spiral galaxy
77	NGC 1097	+9.5	galaxy interacting with its satellite
85	Whirlpool Galaxy (M51)	+8.4	galaxy interacting with its satellite
116	Messier 60	+8.8	colliding galaxies
152	Virgo A (M87)	+8.6	elliptical galaxy
153	Centaurus A (NGC 5128)	+6.6	radio galaxy in a collision?
188	Tadpole Galaxy	+14.4	galaxy finishing merging
242	Mice Galaxies	+14.7	colliding galaxies
244	Antennae Galaxies	+10.3	colliding galaxies
317	Messier 65	+9.2	spiral galaxy
319	NGC 7320	+15	galaxy in colliding group
337	Cigar Galaxy (M82)	+8.6	starburst galaxy

== Catalog list ==
=== Spiral galaxies ===
==== Low surface brightness ====
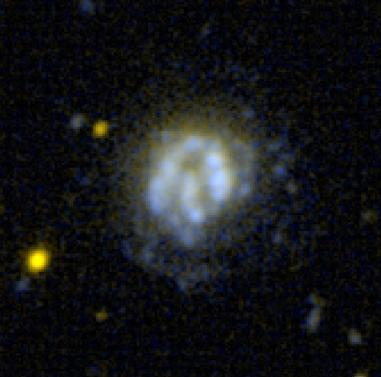
Ultraviolet image of NGC 2537 (Arp 6)

These are mostly dwarf galaxies or poorly defined spiral galaxies (with the designation Sm) that have low surface brightnesses (i.e. they emit little light per unit area). Low surface brightness galaxies are actually quite common. The exception is NGC 2857 (Arp 1), which is an Sc spiral galaxy (which means that it has a definite structure with loosely wound spiral arms and a faint but well-defined nucleus).

Arp number	Common name	Notes
1	NGC 2857	Sc spiral galaxy
2	UGC 10310	
3	Arp 3	
4	Arp 4	
5	NGC 3664	
6	NGC 2537	

==== Split arms ====
This category contains spiral galaxies with arms that split into two separate parts.

Arp number	Common name	Notes
7	Arp 7	
8	NGC 497	
9	NGC 2523	
10	UGC 1775	Contains an off-center nucleus
11	UGC 717	
12	NGC 2608	

==== Detached segments ====
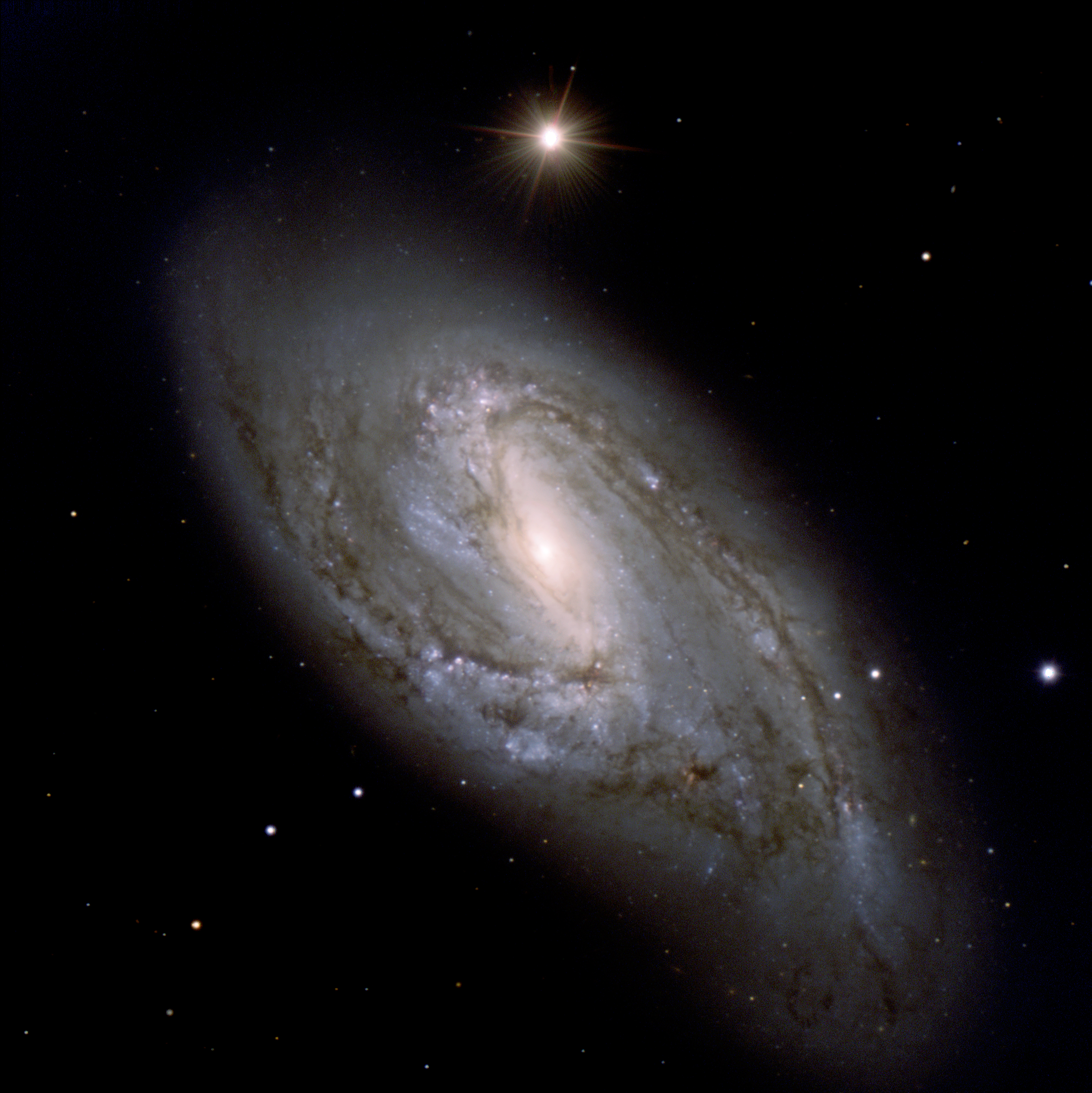
M66 (Arp 16)

This category contains spiral galaxies with arms that appear to be segmented. Some spiral arm segments may appear detached because dust lanes in the spiral arms obscure the arms' starlight. Other spiral arms may appear segmented because of the presence of bright star clusters (or discontinuous chains of bright star clusters) in the spiral arms.

Arp number	Common name	Notes
13	NGC 7448	
14	NGC 7314	
15	NGC 7393	
16	M66	
17	UGC 3972	
18	NGC 4088	

==== Three-armed ====
Usually, most spiral galaxies contain two clearly defined spiral arms, or they contain only fuzzy filamentary spiral structures. Galaxies with three well-defined spiral arms are rare.

Arp number	Common name	Notes
19	NGC 145	
20	UGC 3014	
21	Arp 21	

==== One-armed ====
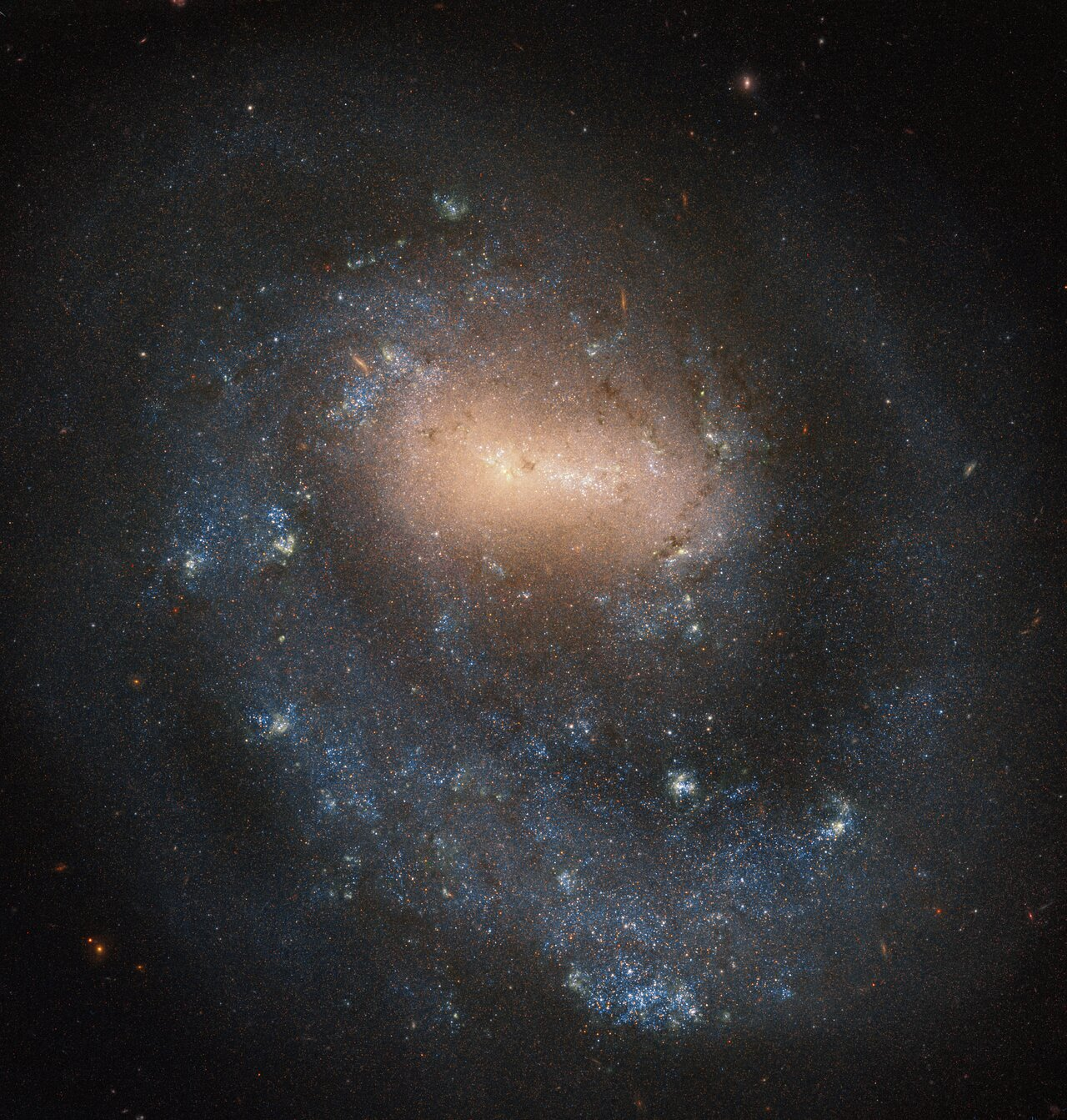
NGC 4618 (Arp 23)

One-armed spiral galaxies, including Magellanic spirals, are also rare. In this case, the single spiral arm may actually be formed by a gravitational interaction with another galaxy (as with the Large Magellanic Cloud itself, although it is not a member of the catalog).

Arp number	Common name	Notes
22	NGC 4027	
23	NGC 4618	Interacting with NGC 4625
24	NGC 3445	

==== One heavy arm ====
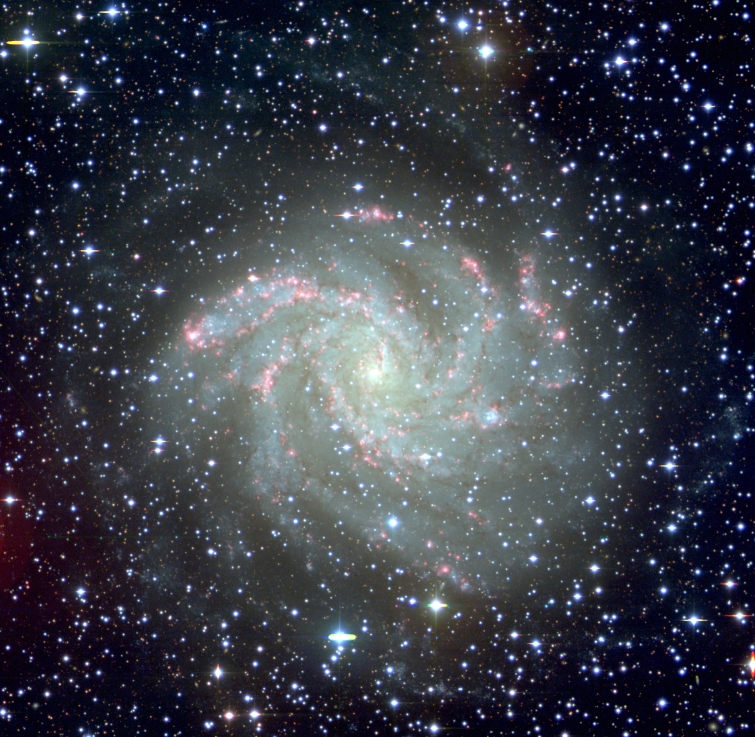
NGC 6946 (Arp 29) spiral galaxy

The spiral arms in these galaxies have an asymmetric appearance. One spiral arm may appear to be considerably brighter than the other. In the photographic plates produced by Arp, the bright arm would look dark or "heavy". While most of these galaxies (such as M101 and NGC 6946) are simply asymmetric spiral galaxies, NGC 6365 is an interacting pair of galaxies where one of the two galaxies is viewed edge-on and just happens to lie where the spiral arm for the other face-on galaxy would be visible.

Arp number	Common name	Notes
25	NGC 2276	
26	M101	Face-on spiral galaxy with five notable companion galaxies
27	NGC 3631	
28	NGC 7678	
29	NGC 6946	
30	NGC 6365	Interacting pair of galaxies, with one galaxy viewed edge-on

==== Integral sign ====
These are galaxies that look like a stretched-out S shape (or like the integral sign used in calculus). Some objects, such as IC 167, are simply ordinary spiral galaxies viewed from an unusual angle. Other objects, such as UGC 10770, are interacting pairs of galaxies with tidal tails that look similar to spiral arms.

Arp number	Common name	Notes
31	IC 167	
32	UGC 10770	
33	UGC 8613	
34	NGC 4615	
35	UGC 212	
36	UGC 8548	

==== Low surface brightness companions ====
Many of these spiral galaxies are probably interacting with the low surface brightness galaxies in the field of view. In some cases, however, it may be difficult to determine whether the companion is physically near the spiral galaxy or whether the companion is a foreground/background source or a source on the edge of the spiral galaxy.

Arp number	Common name	Notes
37	M77	
38	NGC 6412	
39	NGC 1347	
40	IC 4271	
41	NGC 1232	
42	NGC 5829	
43	IC 607	
44	IC 609	
45	UGC 9178	Galaxy triplet
46	UGC 12665	
47	Arp 47	
48	Arp 48	

==== Small, high surface brightness companions ====
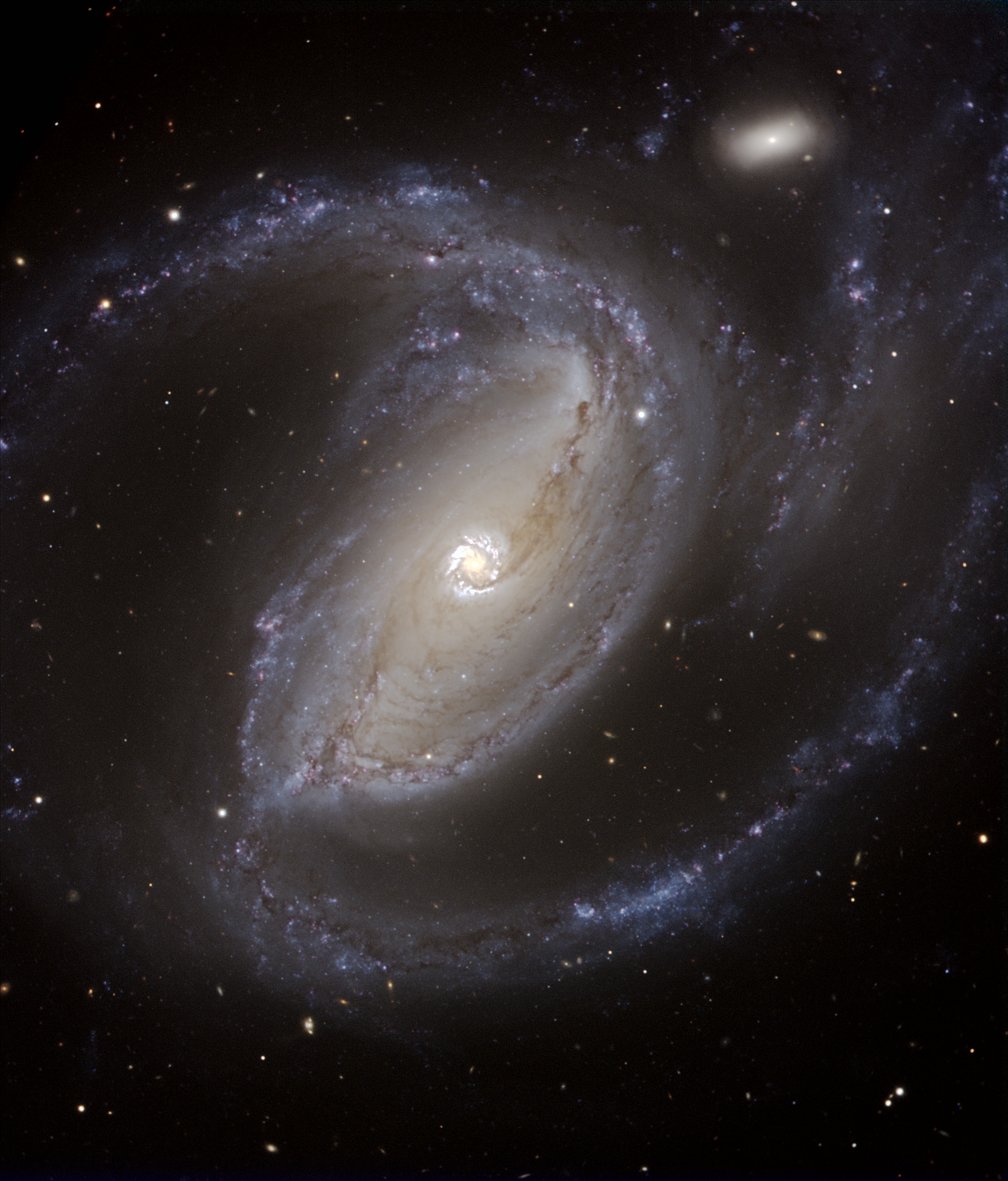
Image of NGC 1097 (Arp 77) spiral galaxy

Again, many of these spiral galaxies are probably interacting with companion galaxies, although some of the identified companion galaxies may be foreground/background sources or even bright star clusters within the individual galaxies.

Arp number	Common name	Notes
49	NGC 5665	
50	IC 1520	
51	Arp 51	
52	Arp 52	
53	NGC 3290	
54	Arp 54	
55	UGC 4881	
56	UGC 1432	
57	Arp 57	
58	UGC 4457	
59	NGC 341	
60	Arp 60 (PGC 1762846)	
61	UGC 3104	
62	UGC 6865	
63	NGC 2944	
64	UGC 9503	
65	NGC 90	
66	UGC 10396	
67	UGC 892	
68	NGC 7757	
69	NGC 5579	
70	UGC 934	
71	NGC 6045	
72	NGC 5994, NGC 5996	
73	IC 1222	
74	UGC 1626	
75	NGC 702	
76	M90	
77	NGC 1097	
78	NGC 772	

==== Large, high surface brightness companions ====
The Whirlpool Galaxy (M51, Arp 85). This object consists of a larger spiral galaxy interacting with an elliptical galaxy.

Galaxies in this category are almost always clearly interacting sources. The most famous of these objects is the Whirlpool Galaxy (M51; Arp 85), which is composed of a spiral galaxy NGC 5194 that is interacting with a smaller elliptical galaxy NGC 5195. The interaction has distorted the shape of both galaxies; the spiral arm pattern has been enhanced in the larger spiral galaxy, and a bridge of stars and gas has formed between the two galaxies. Many of the other galaxies in this category are also connected by bridges.

Arp number	Common name	Notes
79	NGC 5490C	
80	NGC 2633	
81	NGC 6621, UGC 11175, NGC 6622	
82	NGC 2535, NGC 2536	
83	NGC 3799, NGC 3800	
84	NGC 5394, NGC 5395	
85	Whirlpool Galaxy (M51)	
86	NGC 7752, NGC 7753	
87	NGC 3808A, NGC 3808B	
88	Arp 88	
89	NGC 2648	
90	NGC 5929, NGC 5930	
91	NGC 5953, NGC 5954	

==== Elliptical companions ====
Like the spiral galaxies with high surface brightness companions, most of these spiral galaxies are clearly interacting systems. Tidal tails and bridges are visible in many of the images.

Arp number	Common name	Notes
92	NGC 7603	
93	NGC 7284, NGC 7285	
94	NGC 3226, NGC 3227	
95	IC 4461, IC 4462	
96	UGC 3528	
97	UGC 7085A	
98	UGC 1095	
99	NGC 7547, NGC 7549, NGC 7550	Galaxy triplet
100	IC 18, IC 19	
101	UGC 10164, UGC 10169	

=== Elliptical and elliptical-like galaxies ===
==== Connected to spiral galaxies ====
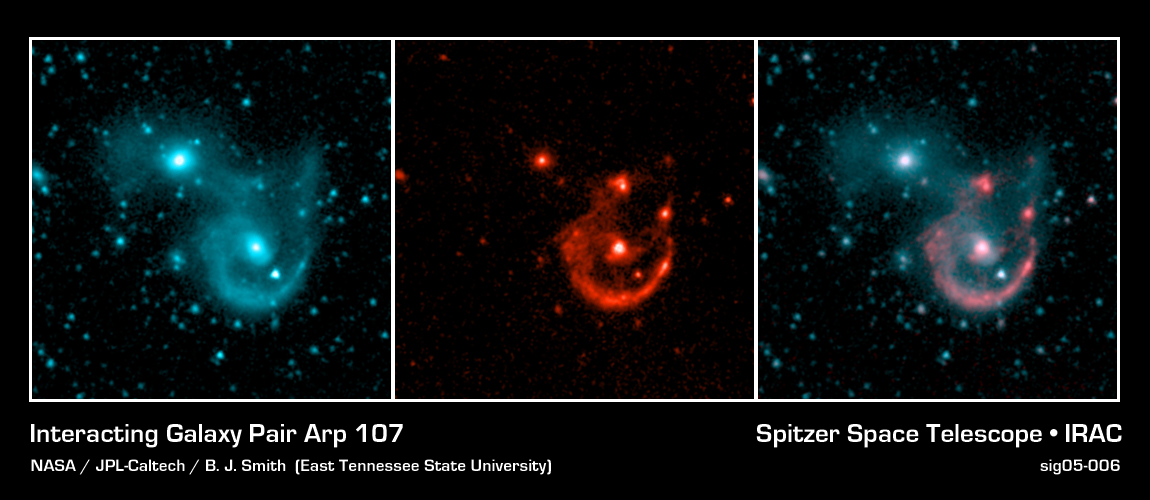
Different wavelength infrared images of Arp 107 (UGC 5984).

These objects are very similar to the spiral galaxies with elliptical companions. All of the galaxies have features such as tidal tails and tidal bridges that have formed through gravitational interaction.

Arp number	Common name	Notes
102	Arp 102	
103	UGC 10586	Galaxy triplet
104	NGC 5216, NGC 5218	
105	NGC 3561	
106	NGC 4211	
107	UGC 5984	
108	Arp 108	

==== Repelling spiral arms ====
Based on the description of these objects, it appears that Arp originally thought that the elliptical galaxies were pushing away spiral arms in companion galaxies. However, the tidal spiral arms may actually look distorted because of the interaction. Some of these "repelled" spiral arms are on the opposite side of the spiral galaxy from the elliptical galaxy. Simulations have shown that such features can be formed through gravitational interactions alone; no repelling forces are needed.

Arp number	Common name	Notes
109	UGC 10053	
110	Arp 110	
111	NGC 5421	Galaxy group
112	NGC 7805, NGC 7806	

==== Close to and perturbing spiral galaxies ====
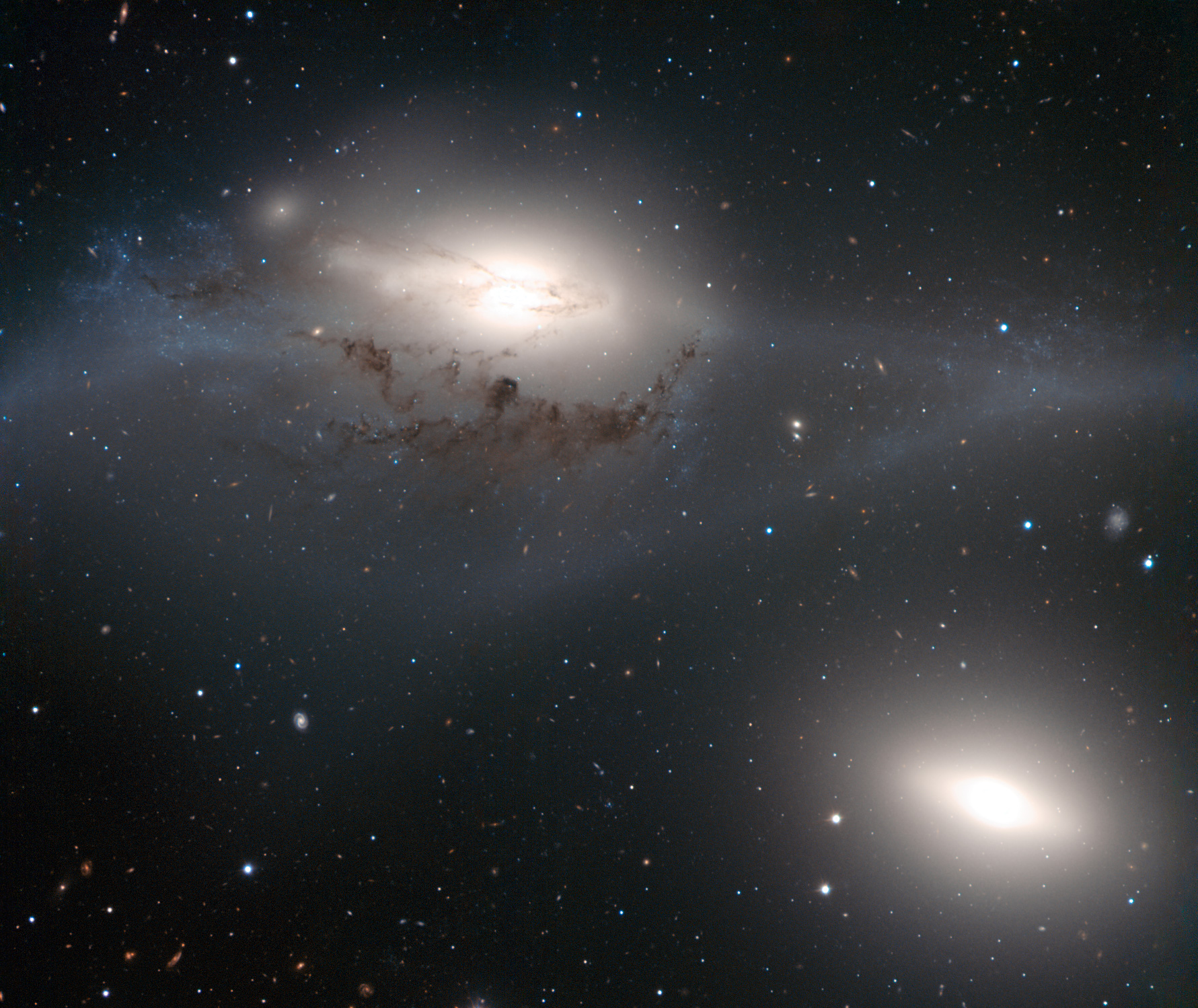
Galaxy pair NGC 4435 and NGC 4438 (Arp 120)

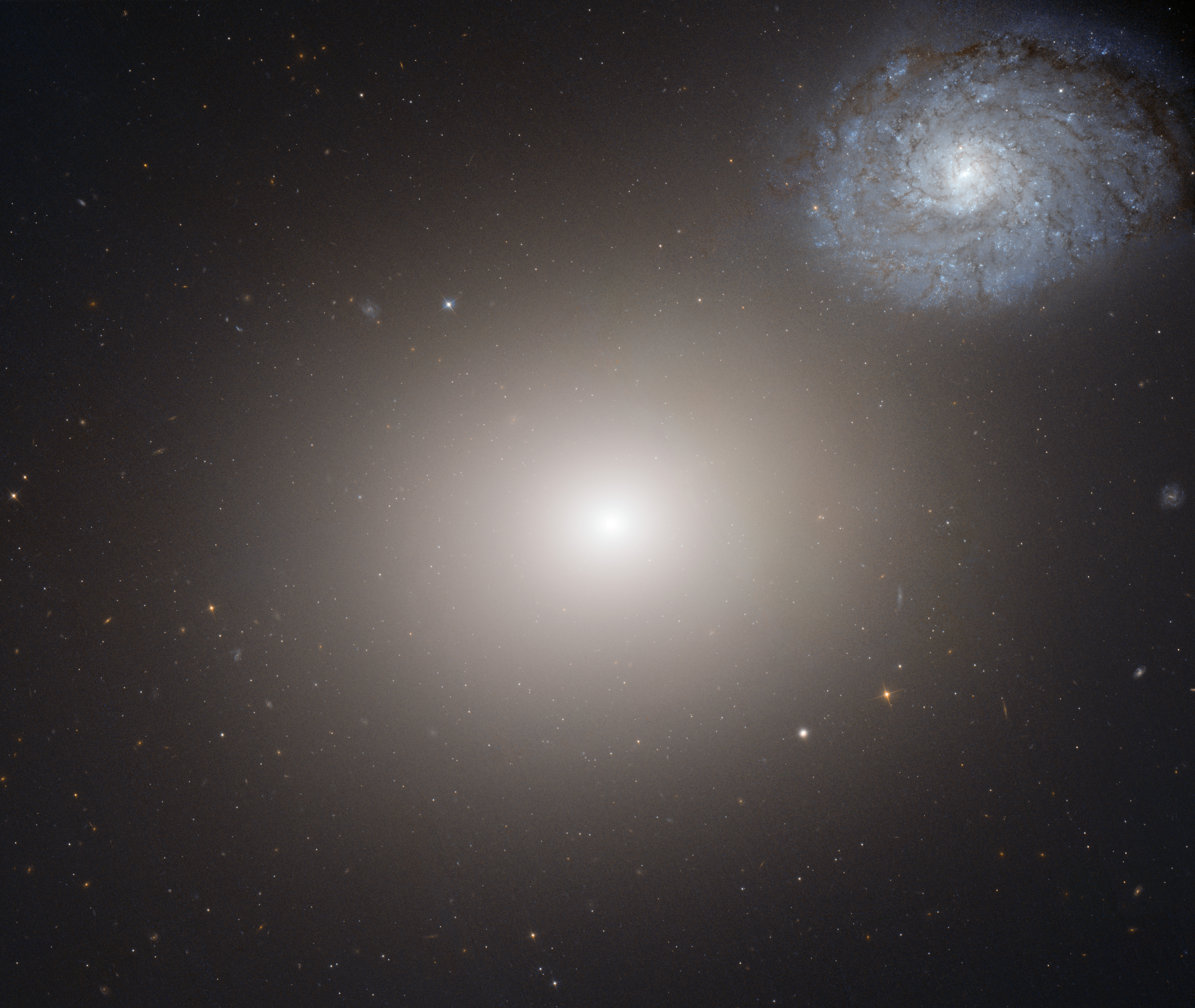
Messier 60 and NGC 4647 (Arp 116)

This is another category in which the majority of objects are interacting galaxies. As noted in the category name, the spiral galaxies look perturbed. Arp originally described some of the elliptical galaxies as repelling.

Arp number	Common name	Notes
113	NGC 70	Part of a group of galaxies
114	NGC 2276, NGC 2300	
115	UGC 6678	Galaxy triplet
116	Messier 60, NGC 4647	
117	IC 982, IC 983	
118	NGC 1141, NGC 1142	
119	Arp 119	
120	NGC 4435, NGC 4438	
121	Arp 121	
122	NGC 6040	
123	NGC 1888, NGC 1889	
124	NGC 6361	
125	UGC 10491	
126	UGC 1449	
127	NGC 191	Actually interacting S0 galaxy and spiral galaxy
128	UGC 827	
129	UGC 5146	
130	IC 5378	
131	Arp 131	
132	Arp 132	

==== Nearby fragments ====
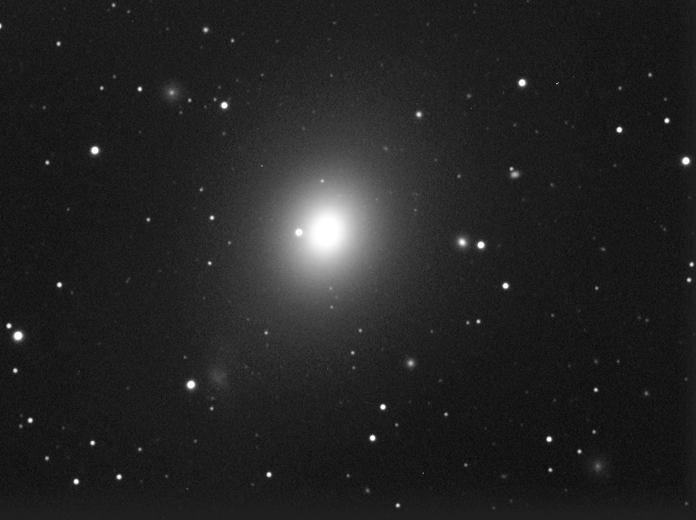
Messier 49, Arp 134

Arp number	Common name	Notes
133	NGC 541	
134	Messier 49	
135	NGC 1023	
136	NGC 5820	

==== Emanating material ====
Arp thought that the elliptical galaxies in this category were ejecting material from their nuclei. Many of the pictures could be interpreted that way. However, these objects are actually a mixture of other phenomena. For example, NGC 2914 (Arp 137) is merely a spiral galaxy with faint spiral arms, and NGC 4015 (Arp 138) is an interacting pair of galaxies where one galaxy is an edge-on spiral galaxy. Some objects, such as NGC 2444 and NGC 2445 (Arp 143), are systems that contain "ring galaxies", which are created when one galaxy (the elliptical galaxies in these examples) passes through the disk of another. This passage causes a gravitational wave in which gas first falls inward and then propagates outward to form the ring structure.

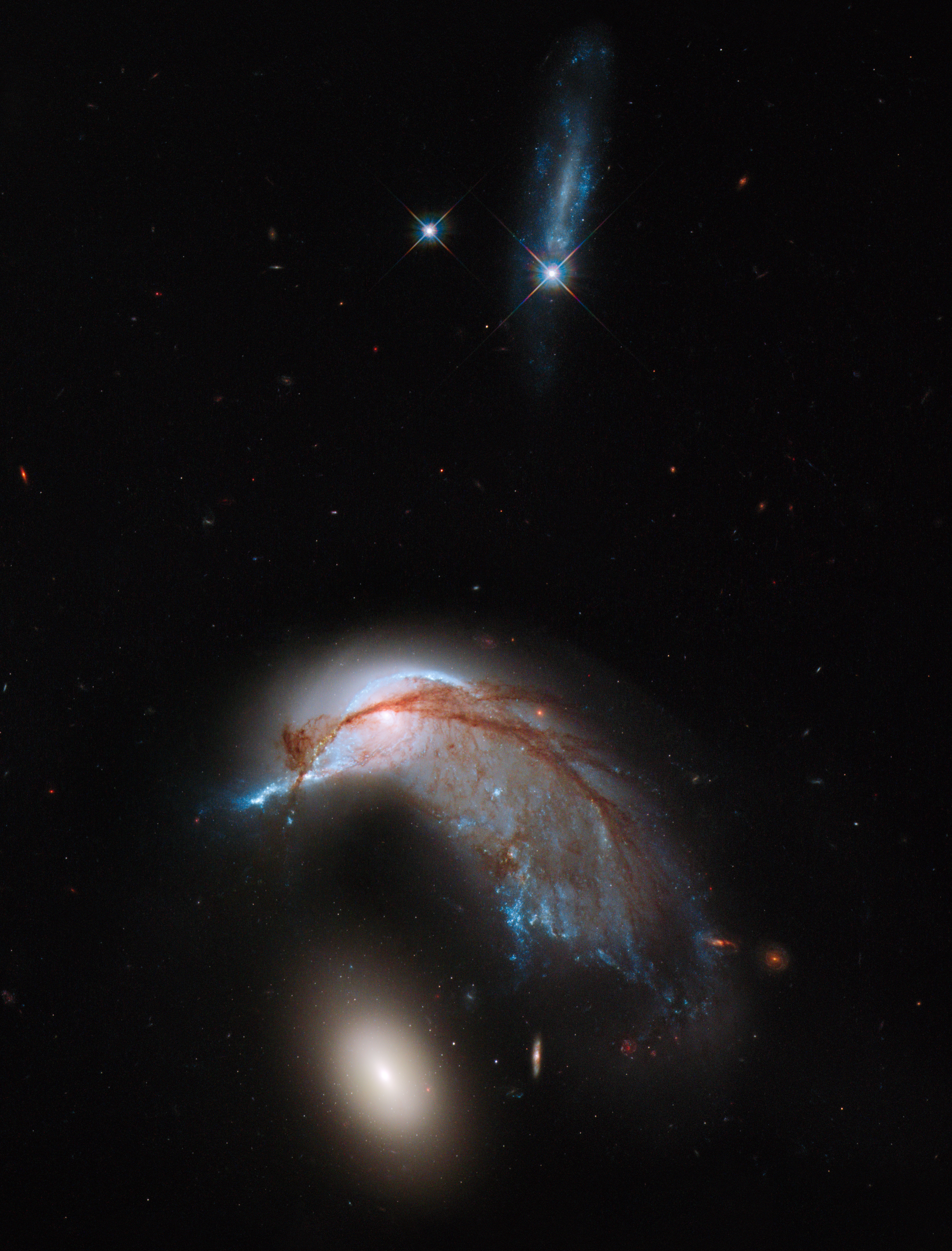
Arp 142: PGC 1237172 (top), NGC 2936, once a standard spiral galaxy (center), and NGC 2937, a smaller elliptical (bottom).

Arp number	Common name	Notes
137	NGC 2914	Spiral galaxy with faint spiral arms
138	NGC 4015	Interacting pair of galaxies
139	Arp 139	Interacting pair of galaxies
140	NGC 274, NGC 275	Interacting pair of galaxies
141	UGC 3730	Ring galaxy system
142	NGC 2936, NGC 2937, PGC 1237172	Galaxy triplet
143	NGC 2444, NGC 2445	Ring galaxy system
144	NGC 7828, NGC 7829	Ring galaxy system
145	UGC 1840	Ring galaxy system

=== Amorphous galaxies ===
Galaxies in this category are referred to by Arp as galaxies that are neither spiral nor elliptical in shape. Although he does not use the term "amorphous" to describe these galaxies, it is the best description of these galaxies.

Many of these galaxies are either interacting galaxies or galaxies that are the remnants of the merger of two smaller galaxies. The interaction process will produce various tidal features, such as tidal tails and tidal bridges, that may last well after the progenitor galaxies' disks and nuclei have merged. Although the tidal tails are described as several different visual phenomena ("counter-tails", "filaments", "loops"), they are all manifestations of the same phenomena.

==== Associated rings ====
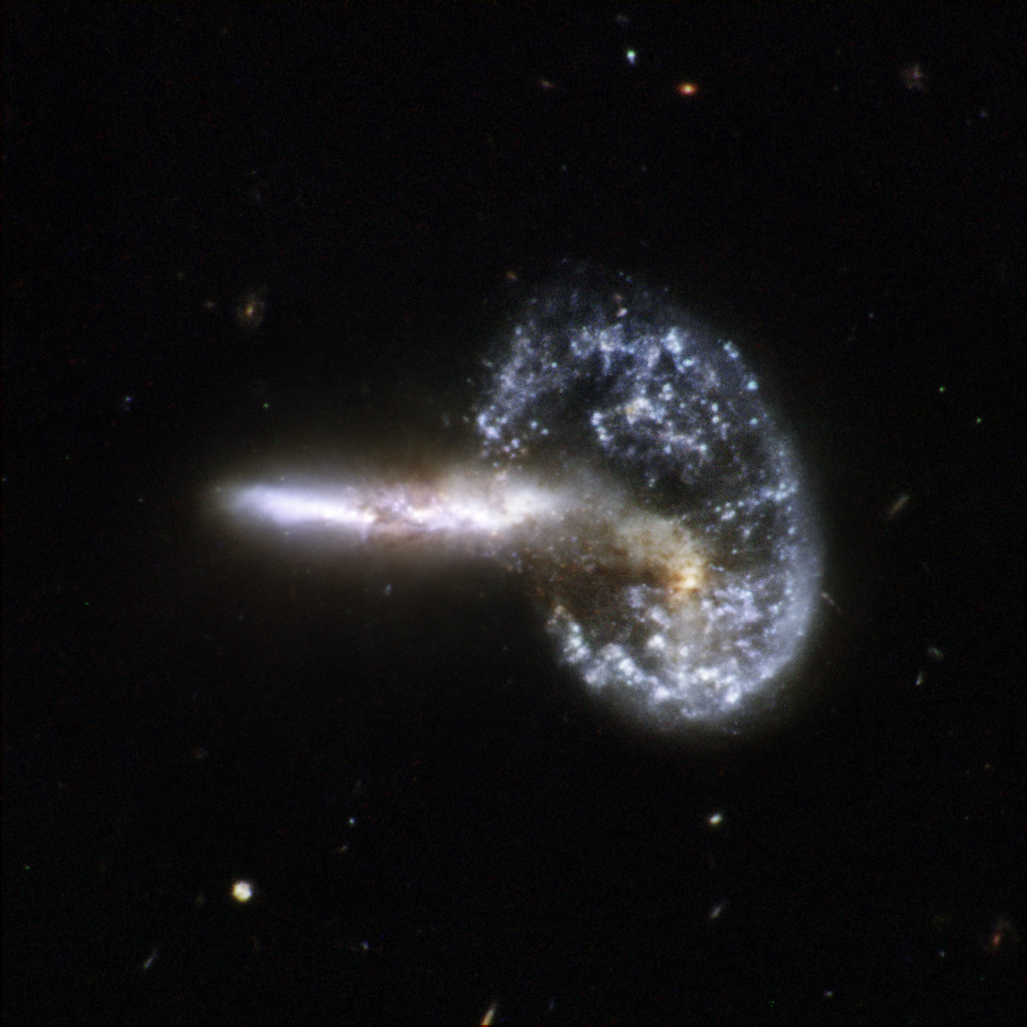
Interacting galaxy pair Arp 148 (Mayall's Object)

As noted above, these ring galaxies may have formed when a companion galaxy passed through the ring galaxy. The interaction would produce a wave effect that would first draw matter into the center and then cause it to propagate outward in a ring.

Arp number	Common name	Notes
146	Arp 146	
147	IC 298	
148	Arp 148	

==== Jets ====
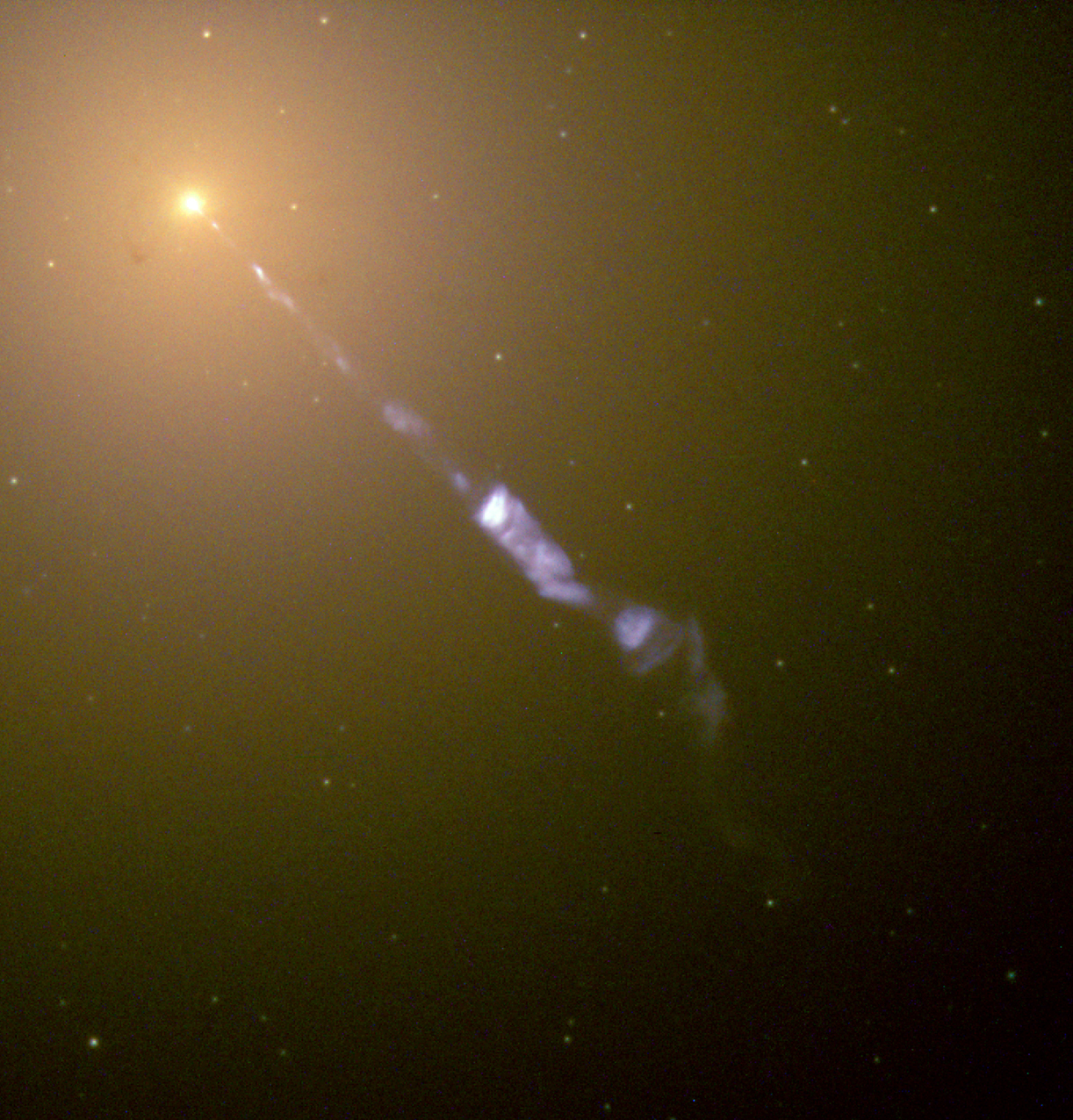
Giant elliptical galaxy Messier 87 with its relativistic jet (Arp 152)

These are galaxies that appear to be ejecting material outwards from their nuclei. The "jets" themselves look similar to water spraying out of a hose. In the case of IC 803 (Arp 149) and NGC 7609 (Arp 150), the jets are simply part of the amorphous structure produced by the interacting galaxies. In Arp 151 and Messier 87 (Arp 152), however, the jets are ionized gas that has been ejected from the environment around supermassive black holes in the galaxies' active galactic nuclei. These jets, sometimes called relativistic jets or radio jets, are powerful sources of synchrotron radiation, especially at radio wavelengths.

Arp number	Common name	Notes
149	IC 803	Interacting galaxies
150	NGC 7609	Interacting galaxies
151	Arp 151	Seyfert galaxy (contains an active galactic nucleus)
152	Messier 87	Seyfert galaxy (contains an active galactic nucleus)

==== Interior absorption ====
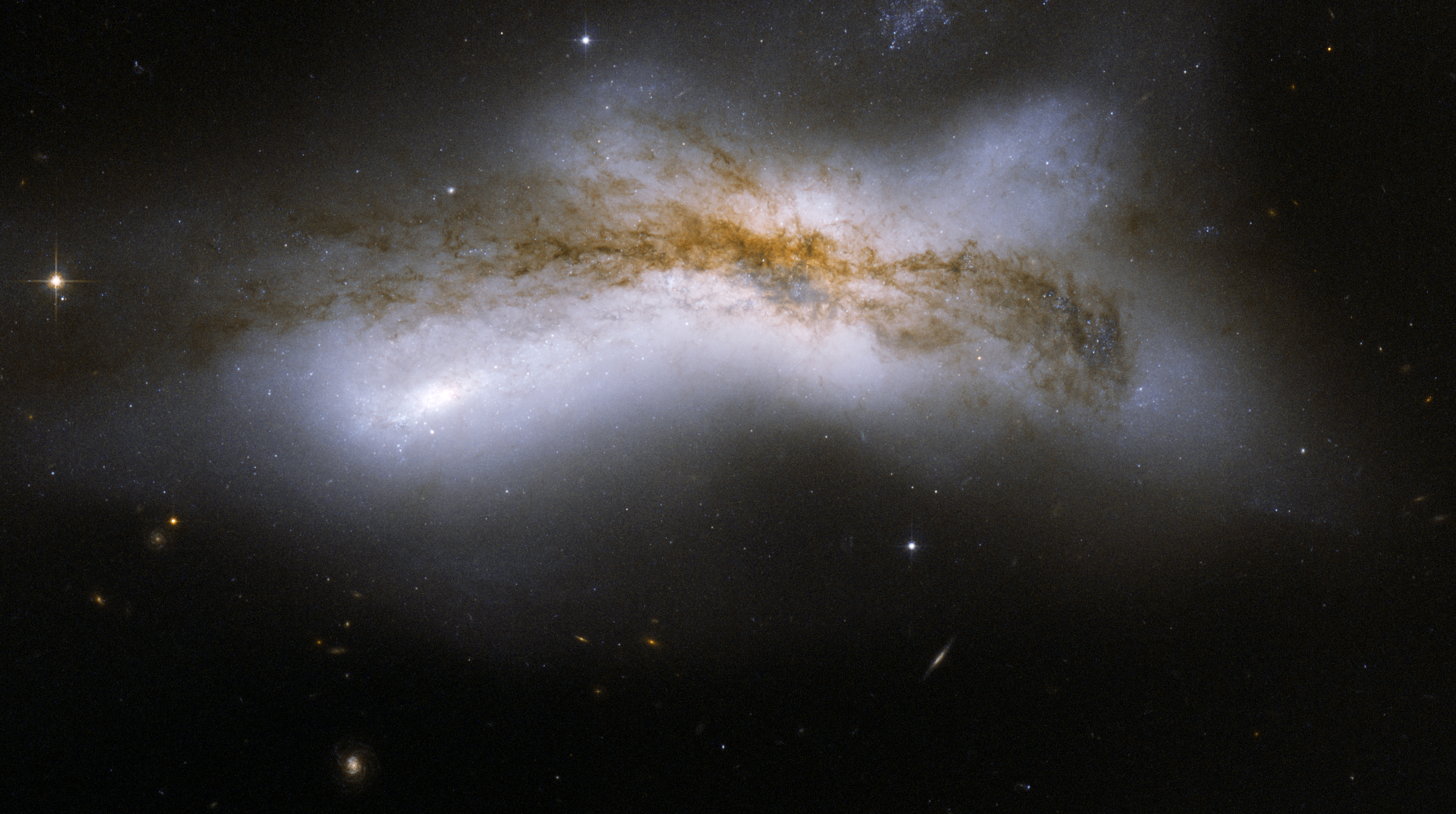
Merging galaxy pair named NGC 520 (Arp 157).

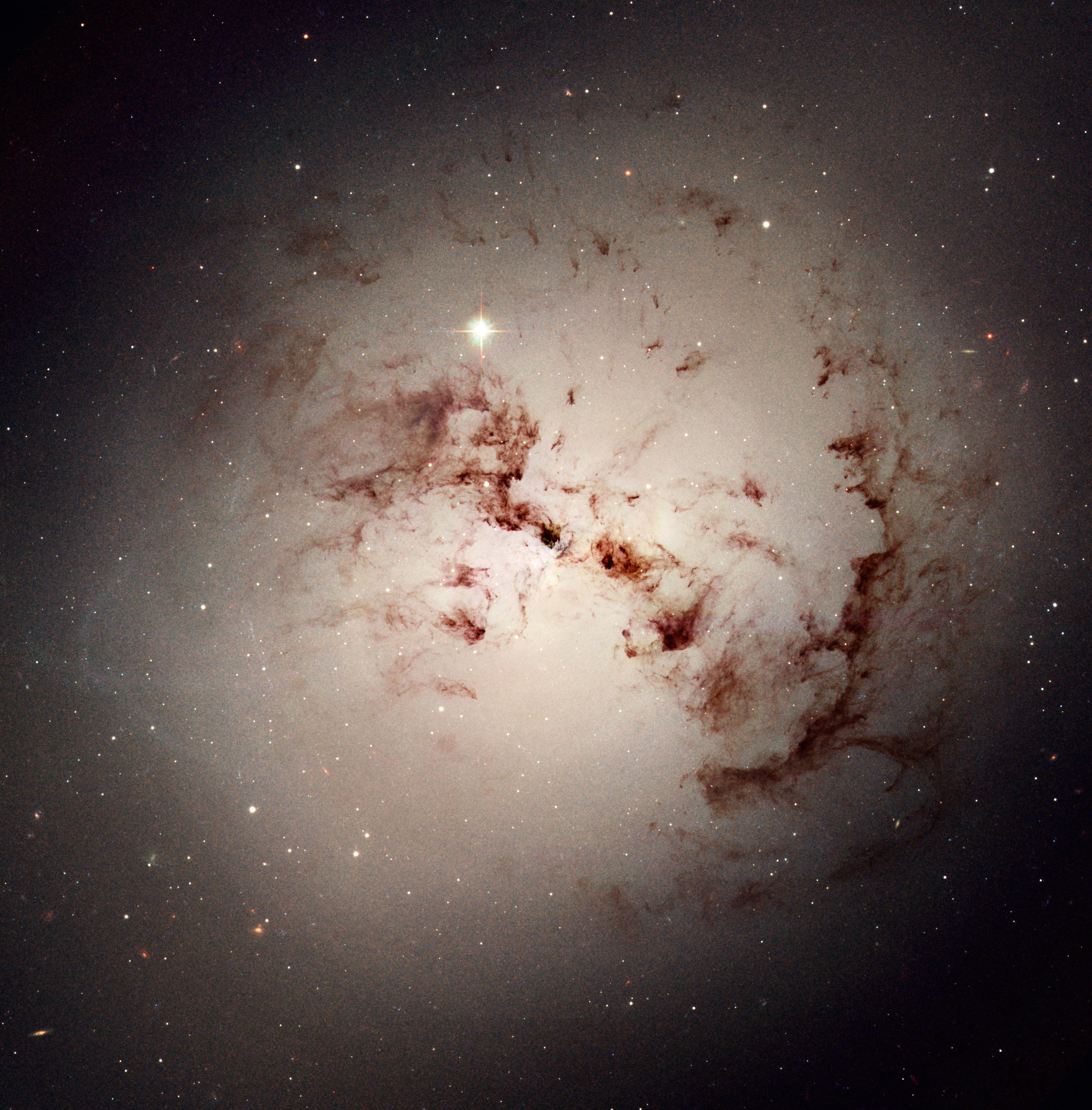
Giant elliptical galaxy NGC 1316.

Galaxies in this category feature dark dust lanes that obscure part of the disk of the galaxy. All of these galaxies are the products of two galaxies merging. NGC 520 (Arp 157) is one of the best examples of an intermediate-stage merger, where the two progenitor galaxies' disks have coalesced together but the nuclei have not. Centaurus A (Arp 153) and NGC 1316 (Arp 154) are both effectively elliptical galaxies with unusual dust lanes; their kinematics and structure indicate that they have undergone merging events recently. NGC 4747 (Arp 159) may be nothing more than an edge-on spiral galaxy with a significantly dark dust lanes.

Arp number	Common name	Notes
153	Centaurus A	Notable radio galaxy; contains an active galactic nucleus)
154	NGC 1316	Notable radio galaxy; contains an active galactic nucleus)
155	NGC 3656	
156	UGC 5184	
157	NGC 520	Notable intermediate-stage merger
158	NGC 523	
159	NGC 4747	Spiral galaxy with dark dust lanes
160	NGC 4194	Also known as the Medusa Galaxy

==== Diffuse filaments ====
The filaments in these objects may represent tidal tails from galaxy interactions. Many of the galaxies are the remnants of the mergers of two spiral galaxies to form a single elliptical galaxy. However, NGC 3414 (Arp 162) appears to be merely an unusual S0 galaxy with a very small disk relative to its bulge size. NGC 4670 (Arp 163) is a blue compact dwarf galaxy with extremely strong star formation activity; it is clearly too small to be the merger remnant of two spiral galaxies like the other merger remnants in this sample, although it may have been involved in a much smaller interaction.

Arp number	Common name	Notes
161	UGC 6665	
162	NGC 3414	S0 galaxy
163	NGC 4670	Blue compact dwarf galaxy
164	NGC 455	
165	NGC 2418	
166	NGC 750, NGC 751	Interacting galaxies

==== Diffuse counter-tails ====
All of these objects are galaxies involved in gravitational interactions. These counter-tails are tidal features caused by the gravitational interactions between two galaxies, just like similar features described in the Arp catalog. Messier 32 (Arp 168), a dwarf galaxy interacting with the Andromeda Galaxy, is included in this category (although the "diffuse counter-tail" is very difficult to see in Arp's photograph).

Arp number	Common name	Notes
167	NGC 2672, NGC 2673	
168	Messier 32	Dwarf galaxy interacting with Andromeda Galaxy
169	NGC 7236, NGC 7237, NGC 7237C	Galaxy triplet
170	NGC 7578	
171	NGC 5718, IC 1042	
172	IC 1178, IC 1181	

==== Narrow counter-tails ====
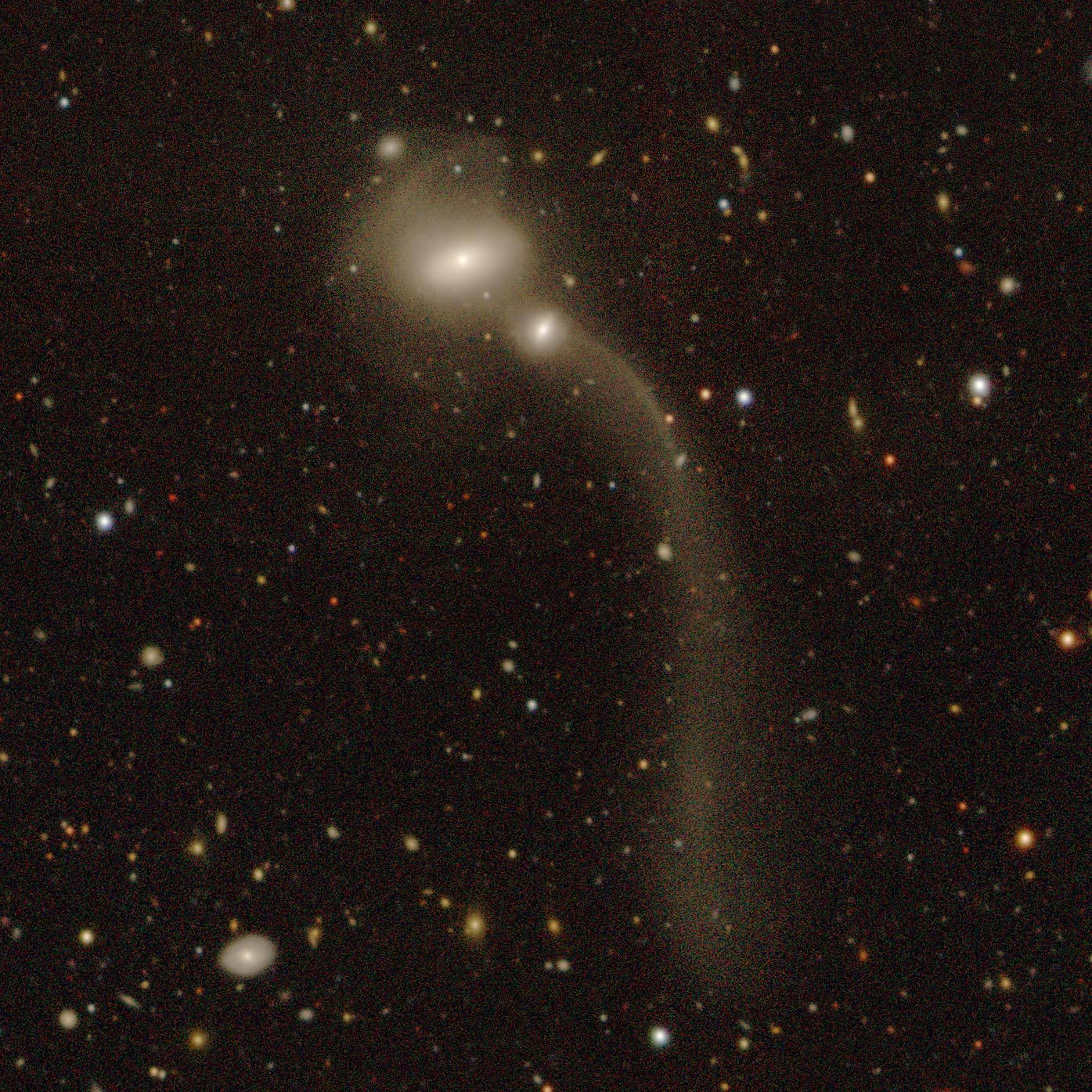
NGC 3068 (Arp 174)

This is another category containing galaxies with tidal tails produced by gravitational interactions. These tidal tails are narrower and better defined than the tidal tails in objects 167–172.

Arp number	Common name	Notes
173	UGC 9561	
174	NGC 3068	
175	IC 3481, IC 3481A, IC 3483	Galaxy triplet
176	NGC 4933	Galaxy triplet
177	Arp 177	
178	NGC 5613, NGC 5614, NGC 5615	Galaxy triplet

==== Narrow filaments ====
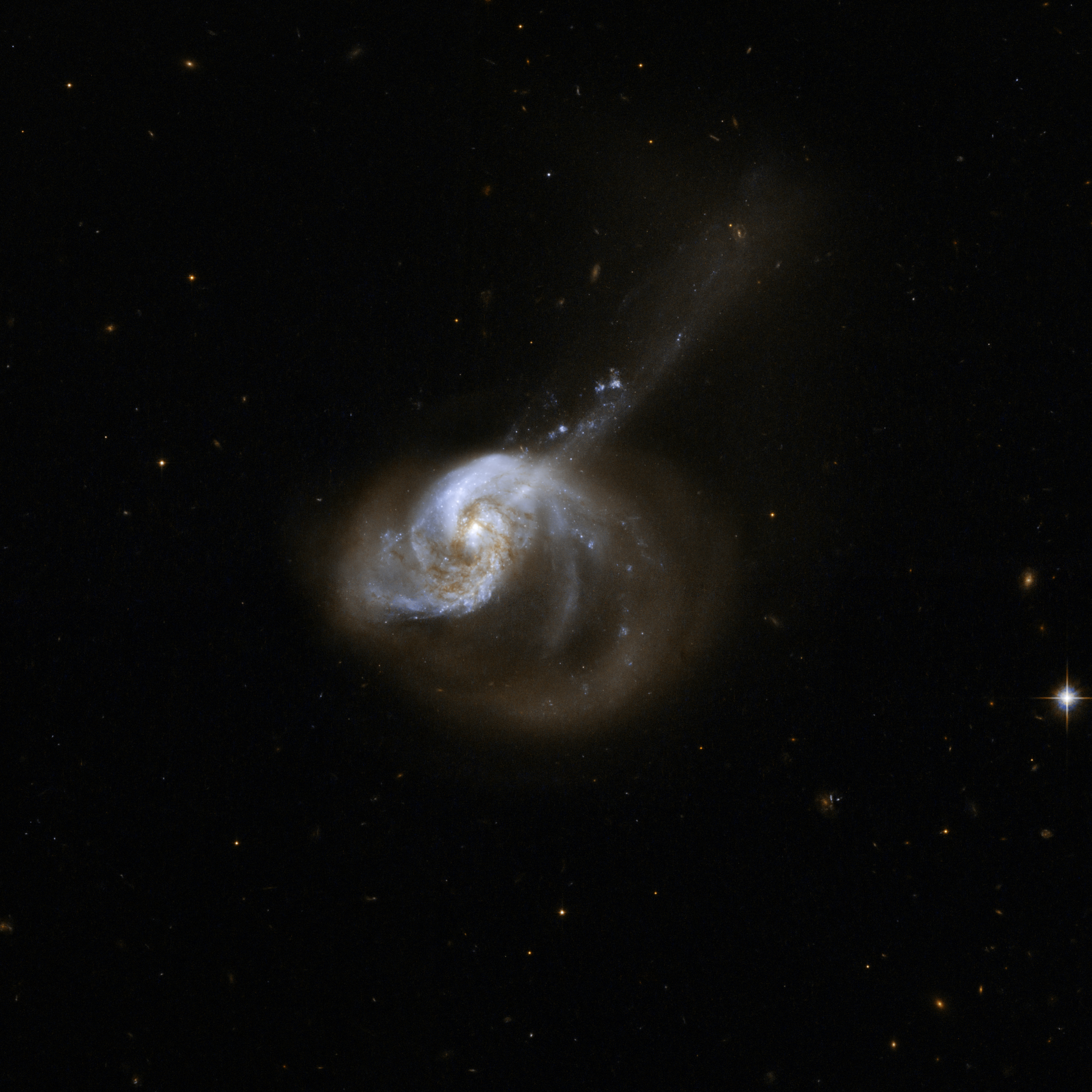
NGC 1614 (Arp 186).

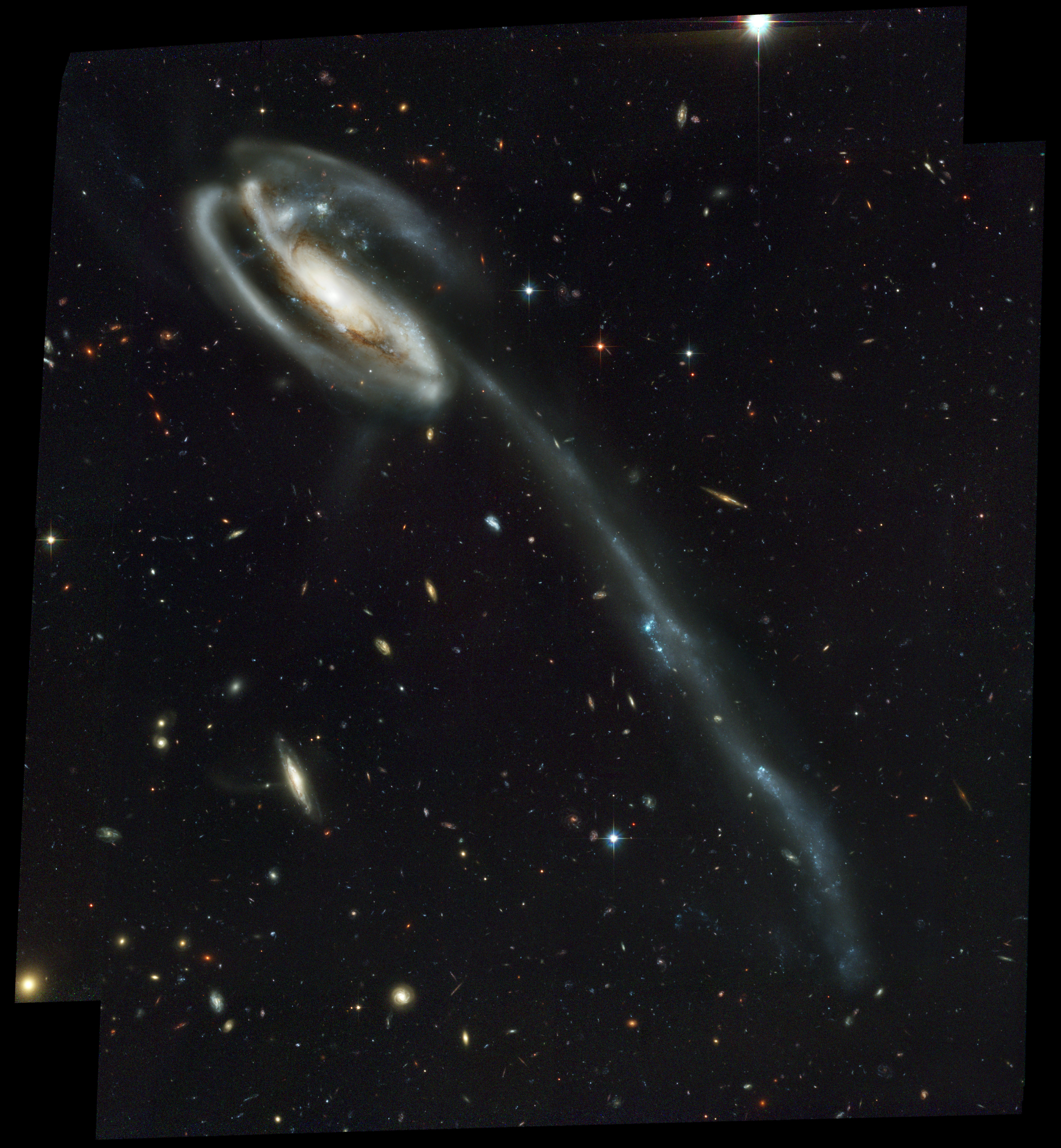
The Tadpole Galaxy (UGC 10214; Arp 188). The "narrow filament", which appears to be tidal feature caused by a gravitational interaction, can be seen extending across this image.

This category contains a mixture of different types of objects. Like the galaxies with diffuse filaments or galaxies with counter-tails, some of the galaxies in this category have been involved in interactions, and the filaments are tidal features created by those interactions. Other sources, however, are simply individual spiral galaxies with faint spiral arms that are described as "filaments" by Arp.

Arp number	Common name	Notes
179	Arp 179	
180	Arp 180	Interacting galaxy pair
181	NGC 3212, NGC 3215	Interacting galaxy pair
182	NGC 7674, NGC 7674A	Interacting galaxy pair
183	UGC 8560	Spiral galaxy
184	NGC 1961	Spiral galaxy
185	NGC 6217	Spiral galaxy
186	NGC 1614	Spiral galaxy involved in recent interaction
187	Arp 187	
188	Tadpole Galaxy	Galaxy involved in recent interaction
189	NGC 4651	Tidal star streams
190	UGC 2320	Interacting galaxy pair
191	UGC 6175	Interacting galaxy pair
192	NGC 3303	Interacting galaxy pair
193	IC 883	Merger remnant

==== Material ejected from nuclei ====
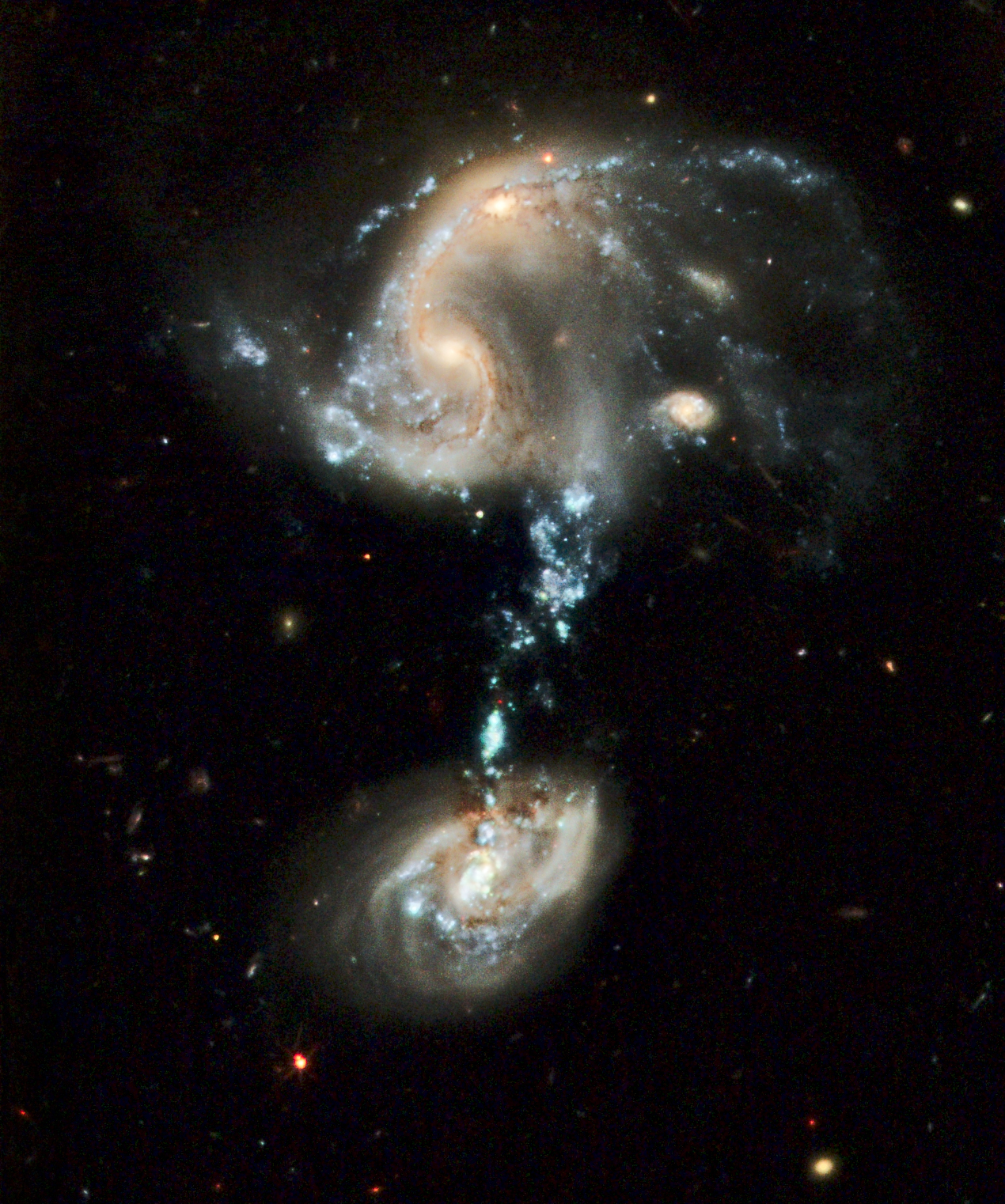
Arp 194. The third galaxy at the bottom of the image is actually a further object, not part of the system.

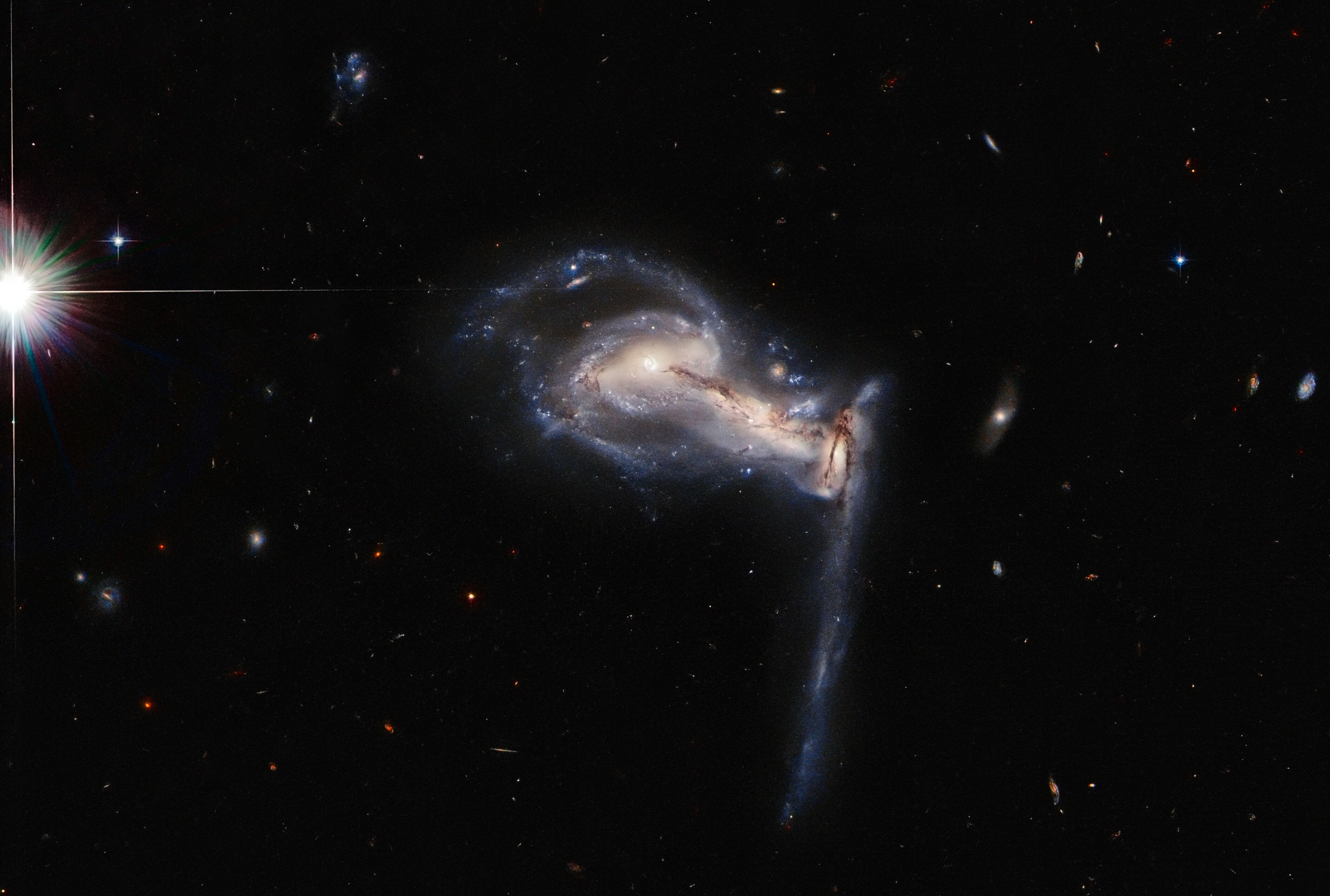
Arp 195, an interacting galaxy triplet located in the constellation Lynx, about 747 million light-years from Earth

The ejecta in many of these objects appear to be tidal features created by gravitational interactions. In some cases (such as for NGC 5544 and NGC 5545 in Arp 199), the "ejecta" are clearly a spiral galaxy viewed edge-on that happens to line up with another galaxy's nucleus.

Almost all of the objects in this category are interacting or have recently undergone interactions. NGC 3712 (Arp 203) is an exception; it is merely a low surface brightness spiral galaxy.

Arp number	Common name	Notes
194	UGC 6945	Interacting galaxy pair
195	UGC 4653	Interacting galaxy triplet
196	Arp 196	Interacting galaxy pair
197	UGC 6503, IC 701	Interacting galaxy pair
198	UGC 6073	Interacting galaxy pair
199	NGC 5544, NGC 5545	Interacting galaxy pair
200	NGC 1134	Spiral galaxy interacting with low surface brightness galaxy
201	UGC 224	Interacting galaxy pair
202	NGC 2719, NGC 2719A	Interacting galaxy pair
203	NGC 3712	Low surface brightness spiral galaxy
204	UGC 8454	Interacting galaxy pair
205	NGC 3448	Merger remnant
206	UGC 5983, NGC 3432	Interacting galaxy pair
207	UGC 5050	Spiral galaxy interacting with dwarf galaxy
208	Arp 208	Interacting galaxy pair

==== Irregularities, absorption, and resolution ====
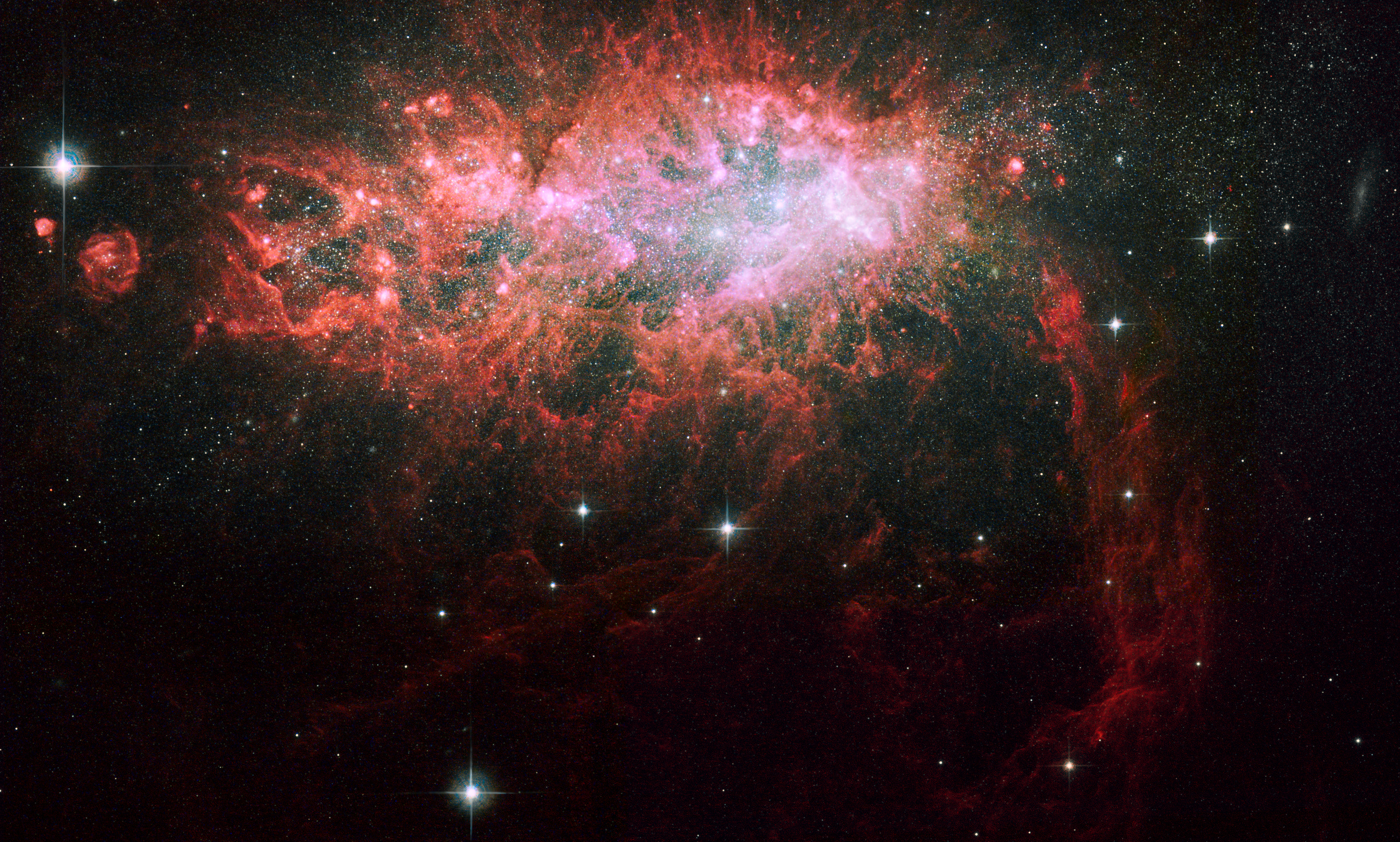
Starburst activity in nearby dwarf galaxy NGC 1569 (Arp 210).

Galaxies in this category have either irregular structures (irregularities), notable dust lanes (absorption), or a grainy appearance (resolution). This category contains a mix of interacting galaxies distorted by tidal interactions, nearby dwarf irregular galaxies, and spiral galaxies with unusual large amounts of gas.

Arp number	Common name	Notes
209	NGC 6052	Interacting galaxy pair
210	NGC 1569	Dwarf galaxy
211	UGCA 290	Interacting dwarf galaxies
212	NGC 7625	Peculiar spiral galaxy
213	IC 356	Peculiar spiral galaxy
214	NGC 3718	Peculiar spiral galaxy

==== Adjacent loops ====
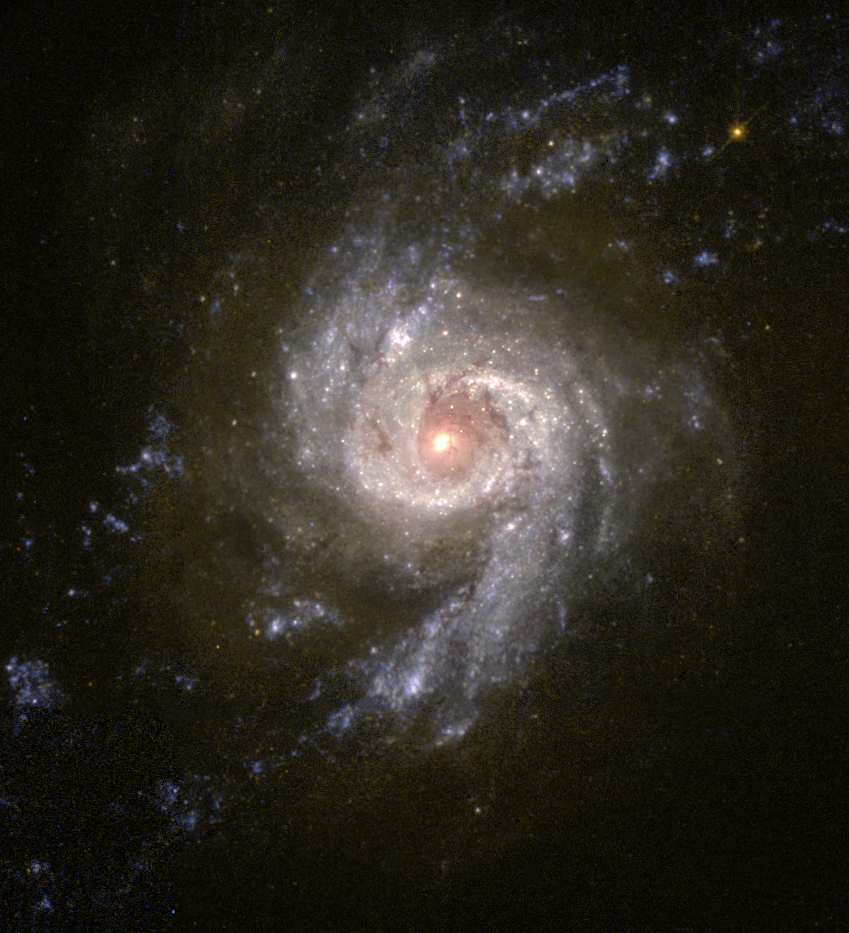
Nearby starburst spiral galaxy NGC 3310 (Arp 217)

These adjacent loops are another manifestation of the structures formed by gravitational interactions between galaxies. Some of these sources consist of galaxies that have nearly completed the merger process; the "adjacent loops" are merely the remnants of the interaction. Among the objects in this category is Arp 220, one of the best-studied ultraluminous infrared galaxies in the sky.

Arp number	Common name	Notes
215	NGC 2782	Peculiar spiral galaxy
216	NGC 7679, NGC 7682	Interacting galaxy pair
217	NGC 3310	Notable nearby starburst; merger remnant
218	Arp 218	Interacting galaxy pair
219	UGC 2812	Galaxy in interaction
220	IC 4553	Merger remnant; notable ultraluminous infrared galaxy

==== Amorphous spiral arms ====
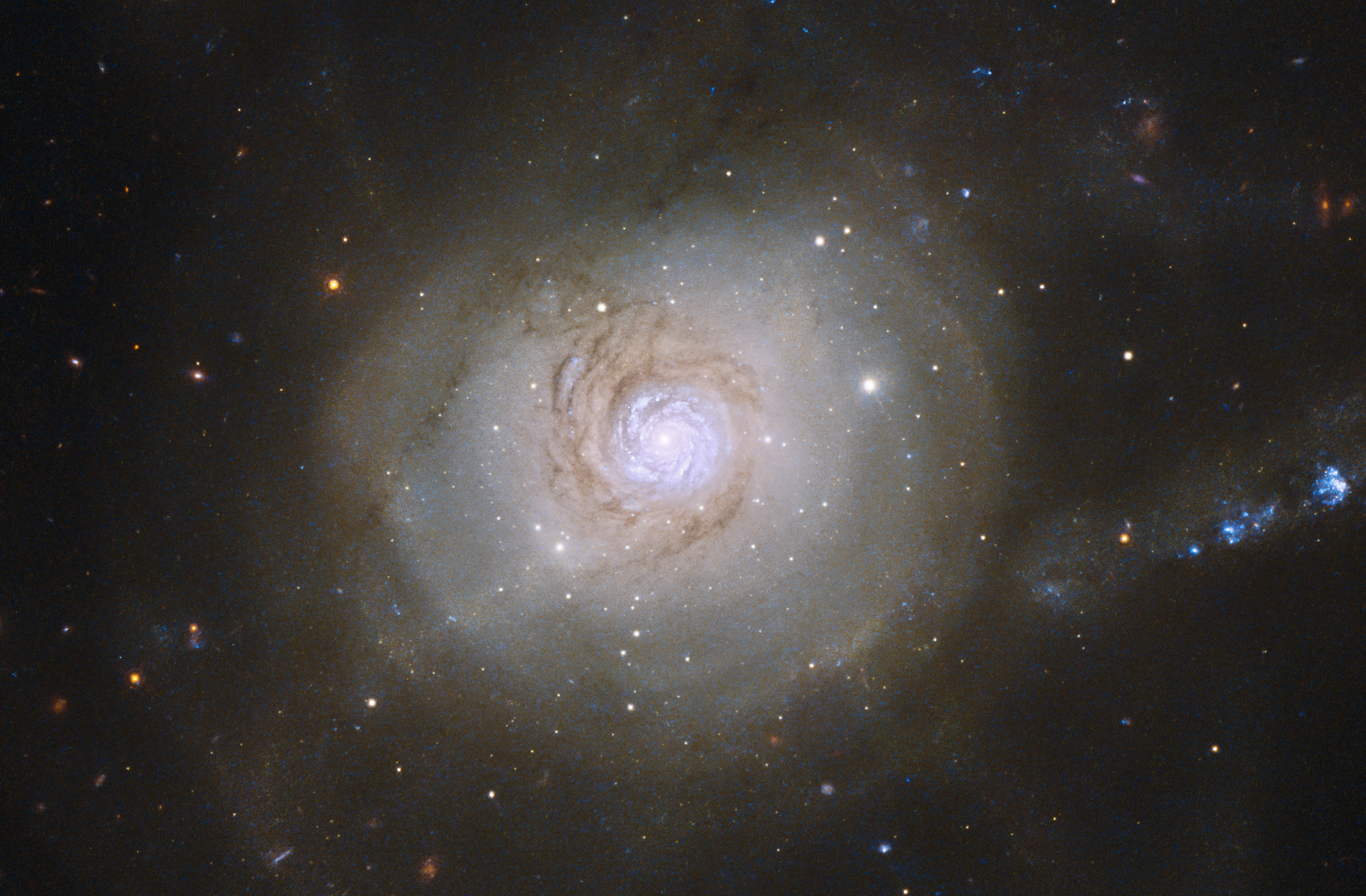
Spiral galaxy NGC 7252 (Arp 226)

Many of these galaxies are merger remnants. The "amorphous spiral arms" are the tidal debris that remains after the collision.

Arp number	Common name	Notes
221	Arp 221	Interacting galaxy triplet
222	NGC 7727	Merger remnant
223	NGC 7585	Recent inequal-mass merger
224	NGC 3921	Merger remnant
225	NGC 2655	Recent inequal-mass merger
226	The Atoms for Peace Galaxy (NGC 7252)	Merger remnant

==== Concentric rings ====
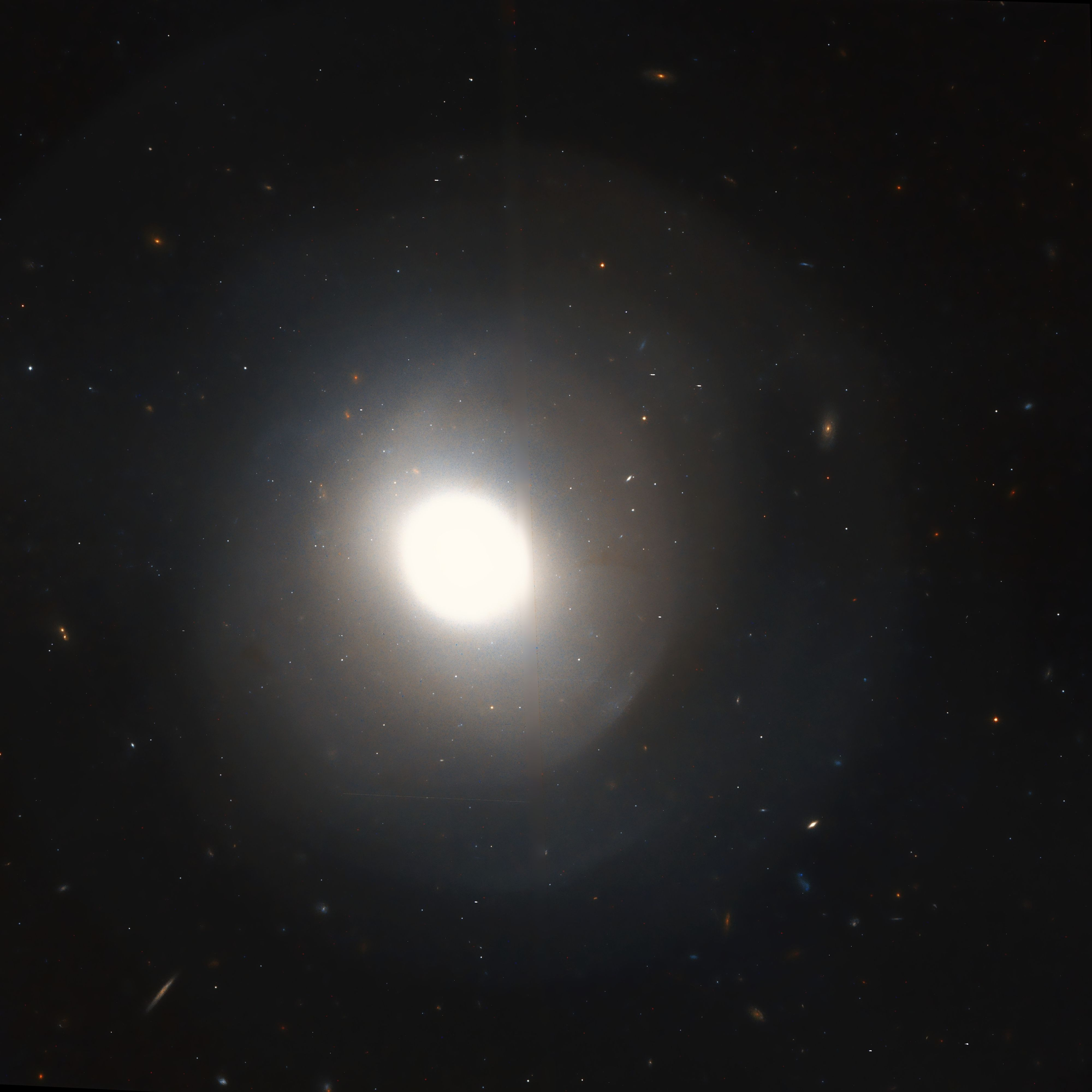
NGC 474, Arp 227

These are galaxies with shell-like structures. Some shell structures have been identified as the results of recent mergers. In other cases, however, the shell structure may represent the outer disk of an S0 galaxy. In some complicated cases, the galaxy with the rings or shells is an S0 galaxy interacting with another galaxy; the origins of the shells in such systems can be difficult to determine.

Arp number	Common name	Notes
227	NGC 470, NGC 474	Interacting galaxy pair with one S0 galaxy
228	IC 162	S0 galaxy
229	NGC 507, NGC 508	Interacting galaxy pair including one S0 galaxy and one elliptical galaxy
230	IC 51	Peculiar S0 galaxy; possible merger remnant
231	IC 1575	
232	NGC 2911	Peculiar S0 galaxy

==== Appearance of fission ====
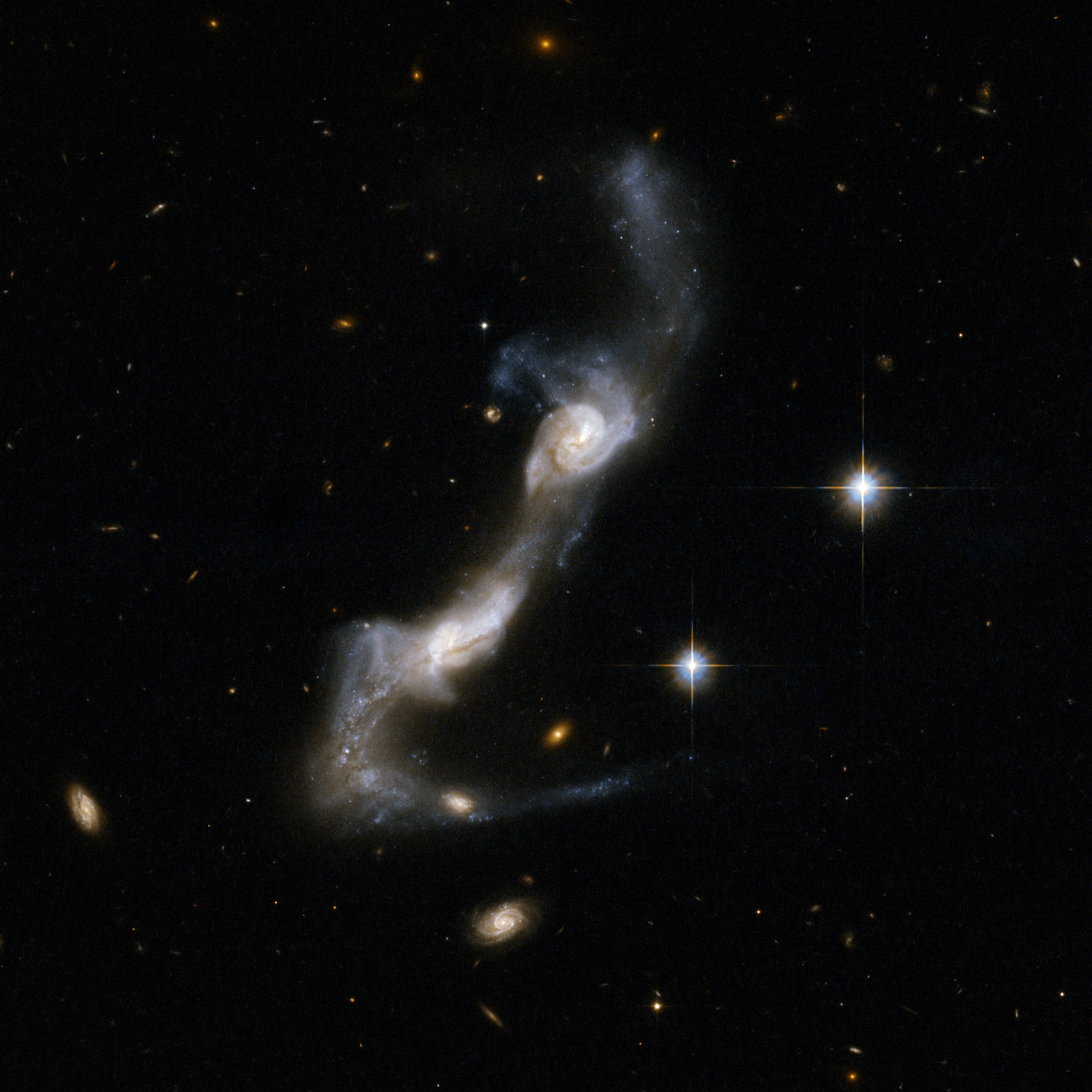
Interacting pair of galaxies: Arp 238 (UGC 8335).

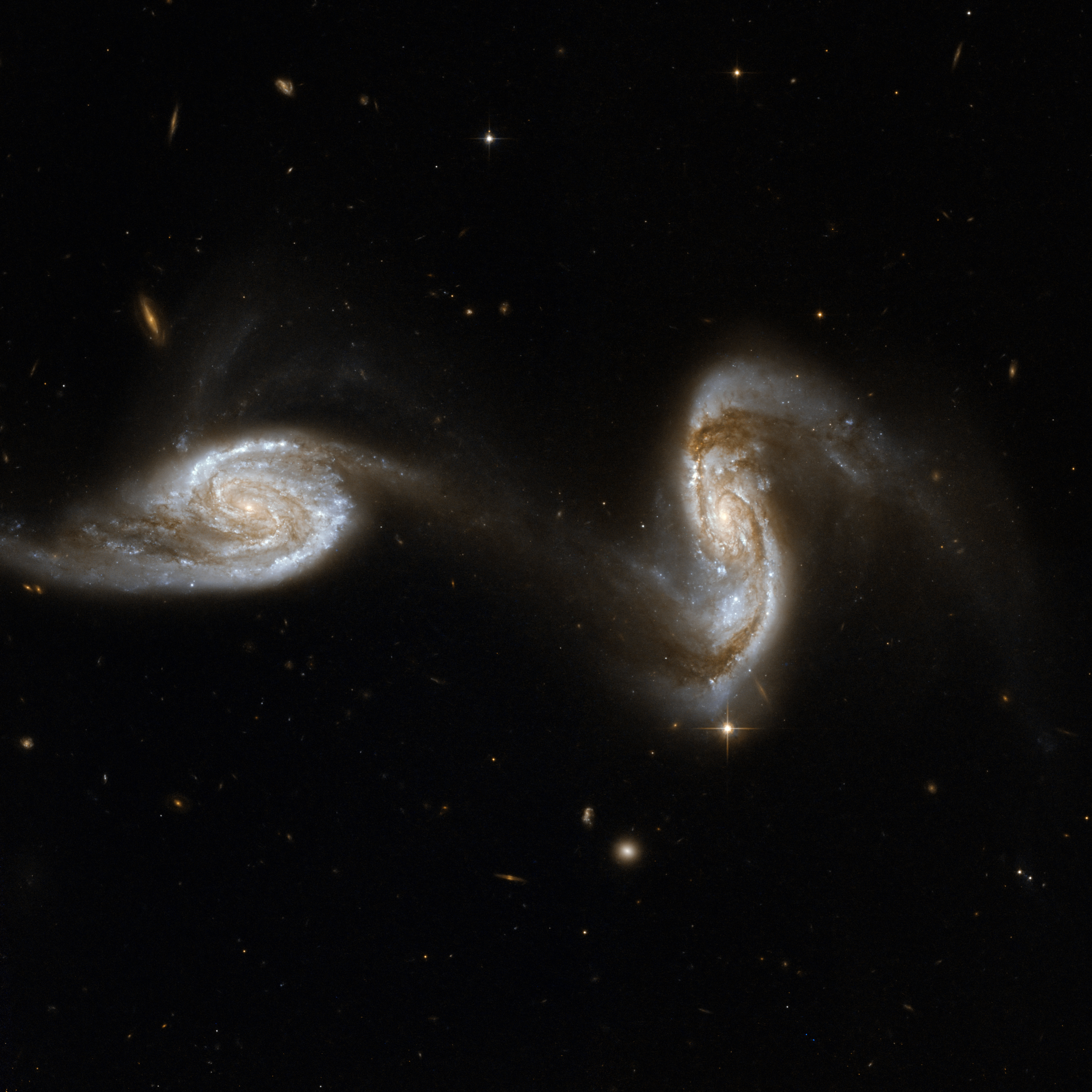
NGC 5257 and NGC 5258 (Arp 240), interacting pair of spiral galaxies.

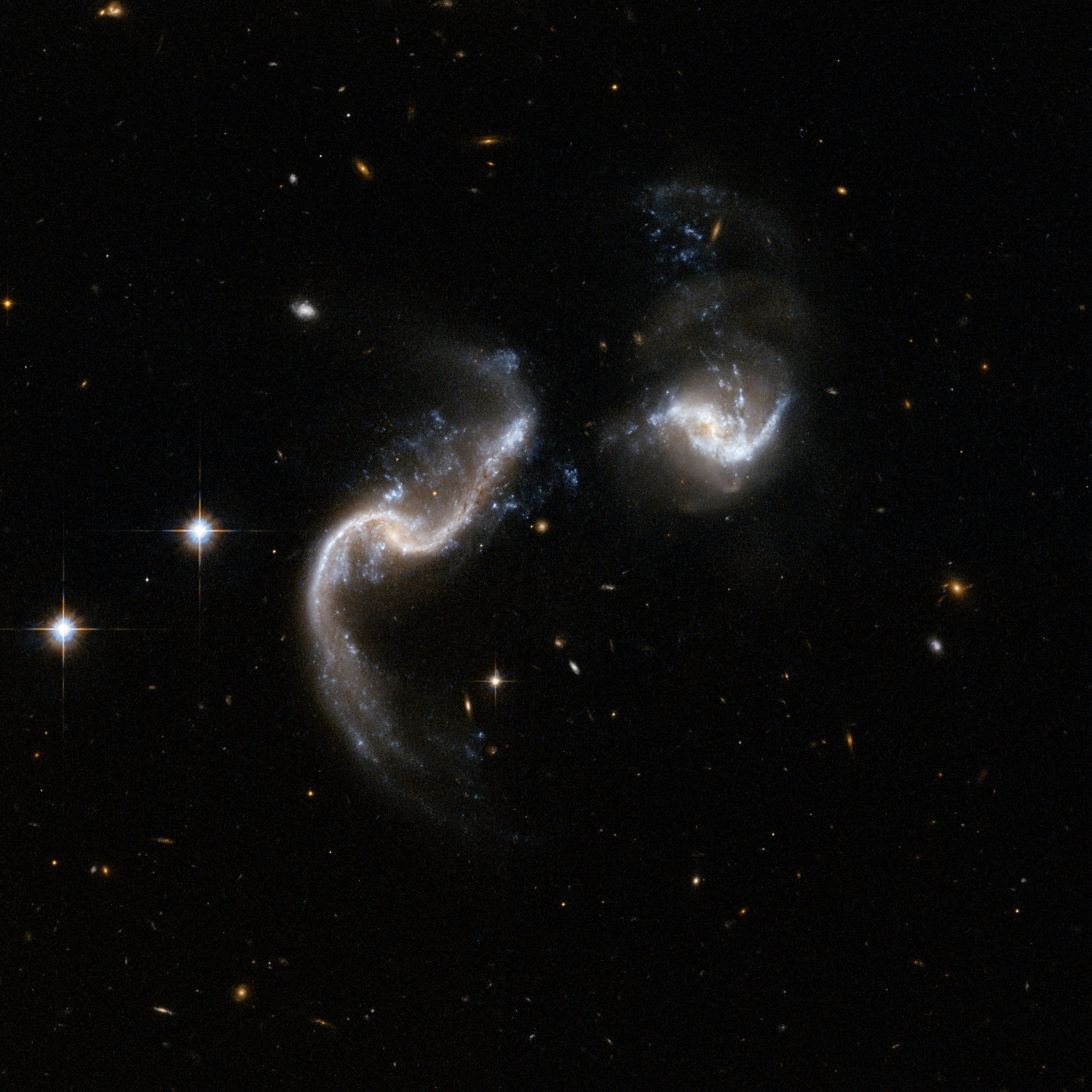
Arp 256, spiral galaxy pair in the early stages of colliding and merging.

Although the description of the objects in this category implies that the galaxies are separating, most of these galaxies are merging. Many of the objects have very pronounced tidal tails and bridges that have formed as a consequence of the interaction. Most objects are in the early stages of the merging process, where the galaxies still appear to have distinct nuclei and distinct (albeit distorted) disks. Among the most notable galaxies in this category are the Antennae Galaxies (NGC 4038 and NGC 4039, Arp 244) and the Mice Galaxies (NGC 4676, Arp 242).

However, not all of these objects are interacting galaxies. A few of these galaxies are simply nearby dwarf galaxies with irregular structure.

Arp number	Common name	Notes
233	UGC 5720	Dwarf galaxy
234	NGC 3738	Dwarf galaxy
235	NGC 14	Dwarf galaxy
236	IC 1623	Interacting galaxy pair
237	UGC 5044	Interacting galaxy pair
238	UGC 8335	Interacting galaxy pair
239	NGC 5278, NGC 5279	Interacting galaxy pair
240	NGC 5257, NGC 5258	Interacting galaxy pair
241	UGC 9425	Interacting galaxy pair
242	Mice Galaxies (NGC 4676)	Interacting galaxy pair
243	NGC 2623	Interacting galaxy triplet
244	Antennae Galaxies (NGC 4038, NGC 4039)	Interacting galaxy pair
245	NGC 2992, NGC 2993	Interacting galaxy pair
246	NGC 7837, NGC 7838	Interacting galaxy pair
247	IC 2338, IC 2339	Interacting galaxy pair
248	Wild's Triplet	Interacting galaxy triplet
249	UGC 12891	Interacting galaxy pair
250	Arp 250	
251	Arp 251	Interacting galaxy triplet
252	Arp 252	Interacting galaxy pair
253	UGCA 173, UGCA 174	Interacting galaxy pair
254	NGC 5917	Peculiar spiral galaxy
255	UGC 5304	Interacting galaxy pair
256	Arp 256	Interacting galaxy pair

==== Irregular clumps ====
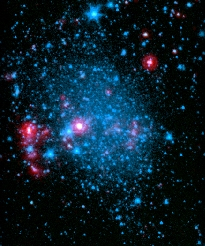
Holmberg II/UGC 4305, dwarf galaxy (Arp 268)

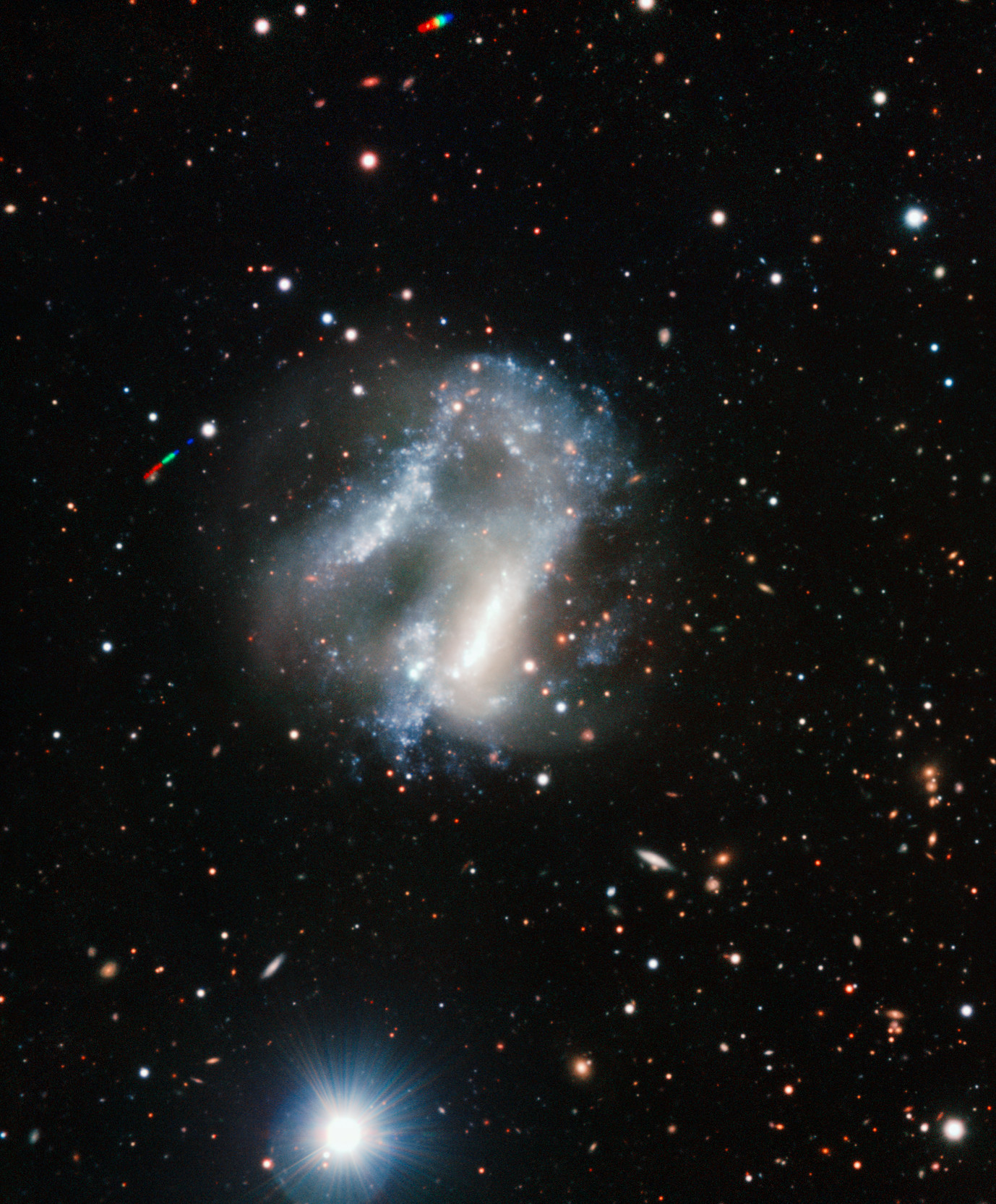
Interacting galaxy pair Arp 261.

These are objects that appear to be a series of irregular clumps with no coherent structure. Many of these objects are simply nearby dwarf galaxies. Some of these objects are interacting galaxies, while others are small groups of galaxies. In both cases, many of the constituent galaxies are irregular galaxies. The superposition of two or more such irregular galaxies can easily look like a single larger irregular galaxy, which is why the Atlas of Peculiar Galaxies (and other catalogs) often classify these pairs and groups as single objects.

Arp number	Common name	Notes
257	UGC 4638	Interacting galaxy pair
258	UGC 2140	Galaxy group
259	NGC 1741	Galaxy group
260	UGC 7230	Interacting galaxy pair
261	Arp 261	Galaxy group
262	UGC 12856	Interacting galaxy pair
263	NGC 3239	Dwarf galaxy
264	NGC 3104	Dwarf galaxy
265	IC 3862	Interacting galaxy pair
266	NGC 4861	Dwarf galaxy
267	UGC 5764	Dwarf galaxy
268	UGC 4305, Holmberg II	Dwarf galaxy

=== Double and multiple galaxies ===
Arp originally referred to these galaxies as "double galaxies", but many of these sources are more than two galaxies. Some of the objects consist of interacting galaxies, whereas other sources are actually groups of galaxies. The difference is that interacting galaxies will be distorted, whereas galaxies in groups are simply gravitationally bound to each other but not necessarily close enough to each other to induce major structural changes.

==== Connected arms ====
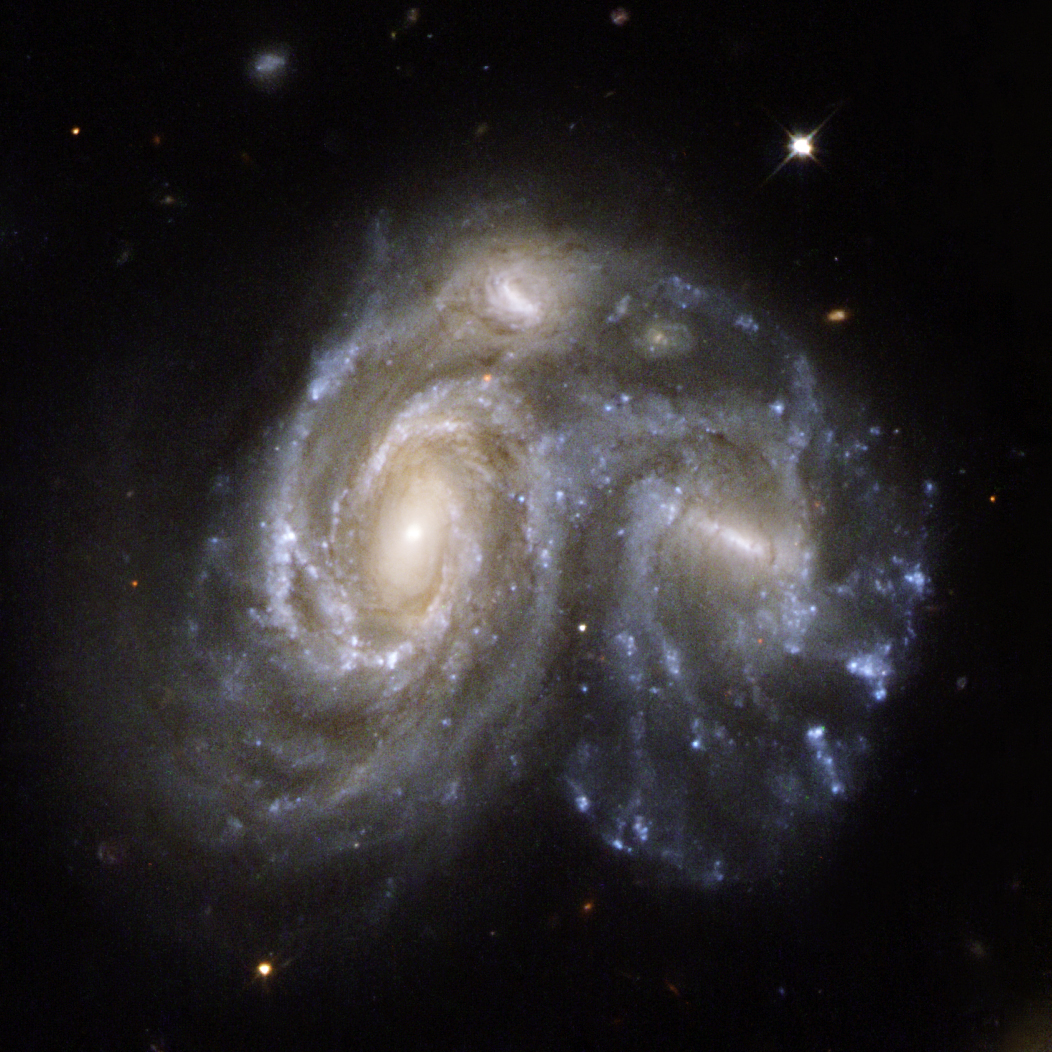
Arp 272: NGC 6050 and IC 1179, interacting spiral galaxies.

All of these galaxies are interacting pairs of galaxies except for NGC 5679 (Arp 274), which may be an interacting galaxy triplet. The connected arms described here are tidal bridge features that form between interacting galaxies. These bridges form early during galaxy interactions.

Arp number	Common name	Notes
269	NGC 4485, NGC 4490	Interacting galaxy pair
270	NGC 3395, NGC 3396	Interacting galaxy pair
271	NGC 5426, NGC 5427	Interacting galaxy pair
272	NGC 6050, IC 1179	Interacting galaxy pair
273	UGC 1810, UGC 1813	Interacting galaxy pair
274	NGC 5679	Interacting galaxy triplet

==== Interacting galaxies ====
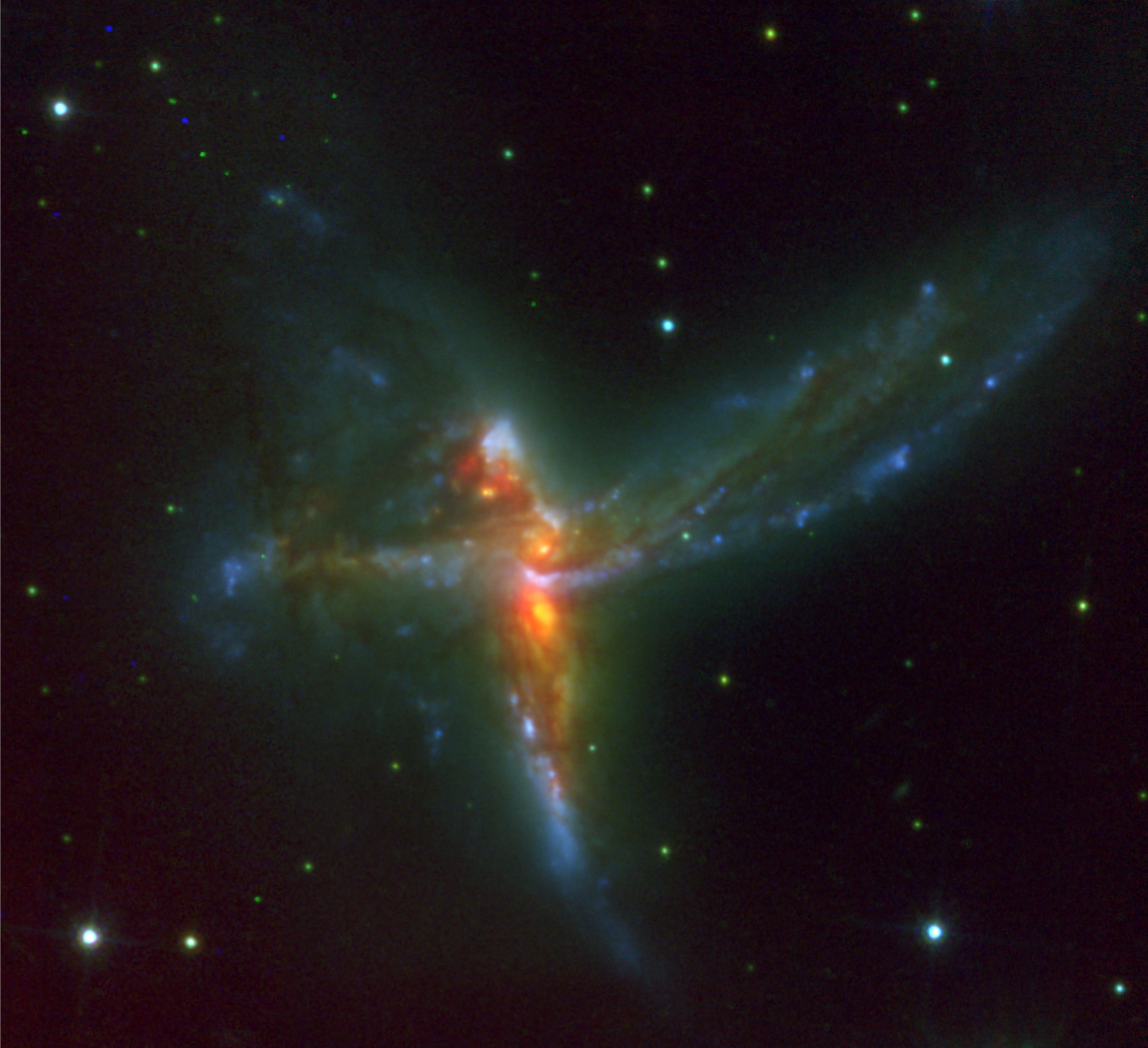
'The Bird' is composed of two massive spiral galaxies and a third irregular galaxy. (ESO593-8)

Unlike many of the objects listed in the amorphous galaxies section, the interacting galaxies that comprise these objects are still distinguishable from each other.

Arp number	Common name	Notes
275	NGC 2881	Interacting galaxy pair
276	NGC 935, IC 1801	Interacting galaxy pair
277	NGC 4809, NGC 4810	Interacting galaxy pair
278	NGC 7253	Interacting galaxy pair
279	NGC 1253, NGC 1253A	Interacting galaxy pair
280	NGC 3769, NGC 3769A	Interacting galaxy pair

==== Infall and attraction ====
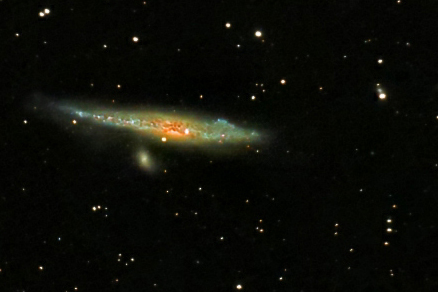
Edge-on spiral galaxy NGC 4631 and dwarf elliptical NGC 4627 (below) comprise the Arp 281 pair

This category contains an odd mixture of objects. Two of the objects are edge-on disk galaxies with smaller companion galaxies nearby. Two of the objects are connected by tidal bridges. The last two objects may simply be interacting with each other over long distance.

Arp number	Common name	Notes
281	NGC 4627, NGC 4631	Spiral galaxy with companion dwarf elliptical galaxy
282	NGC 169, NGC 169A	Spiral galaxy with smaller companion galaxy
283	NGC 2798, NGC 2799	Interacting galaxy pair
284	NGC 7714, NGC 7715	Interacting galaxy pair
285	NGC 2854, NGC 2856	Galaxy pair
286	NGC 5560, NGC 5566, NGC 5569	Interacting galaxy triplet

==== Wind effects ====
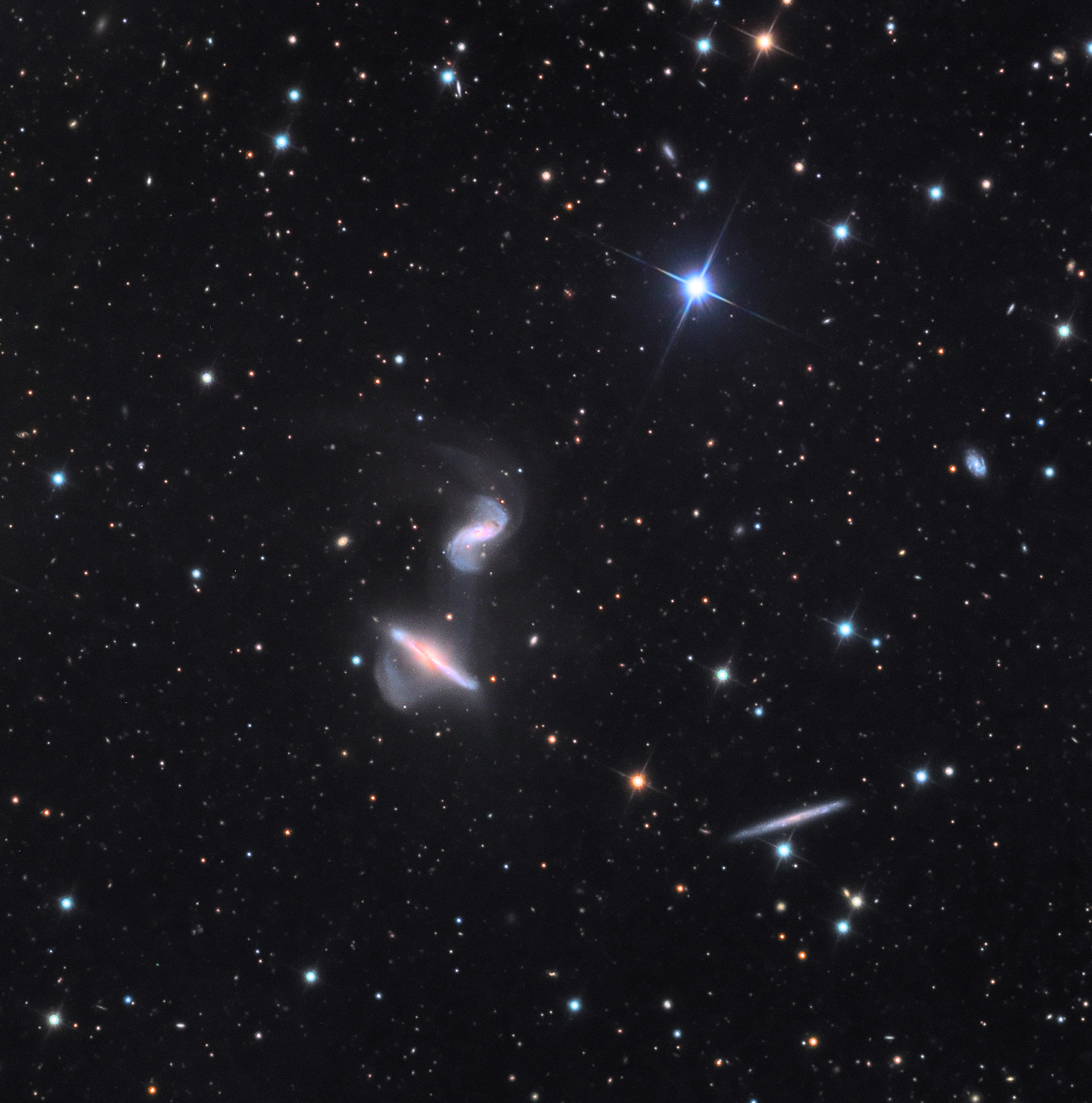
Arp 293. NGC 6285 and 6286 interacting galaxies in 32 inch telescope.

Although included in the double galaxies category, many of these objects are individual galaxies. The "wind effects" refer to the appearance, not the actual detection of high-velocity gas (such as is found in M82). In some cases, the appearance may be the result of interaction. In other cases, particularly NGC 3981 (Arp 289), the faint, extended emission may be related to the intrinsic nature of the galaxy itself and not interactions with other objects.

Arp number	Common name	Notes
287	NGC 2735, NGC 2735A	Galaxy pair
288	NGC 5221, NGC 5222	Galaxy triplet
289	NGC 3981	Peculiar spiral galaxy
290	IC 195, IC 196	Interacting galaxy pair
291	UGC 5832	Irregular galaxy
292	IC 575	Peculiar spiral galaxy
293	NGC 6285, NGC 6286	Interacting galaxy pair

==== Long filaments ====
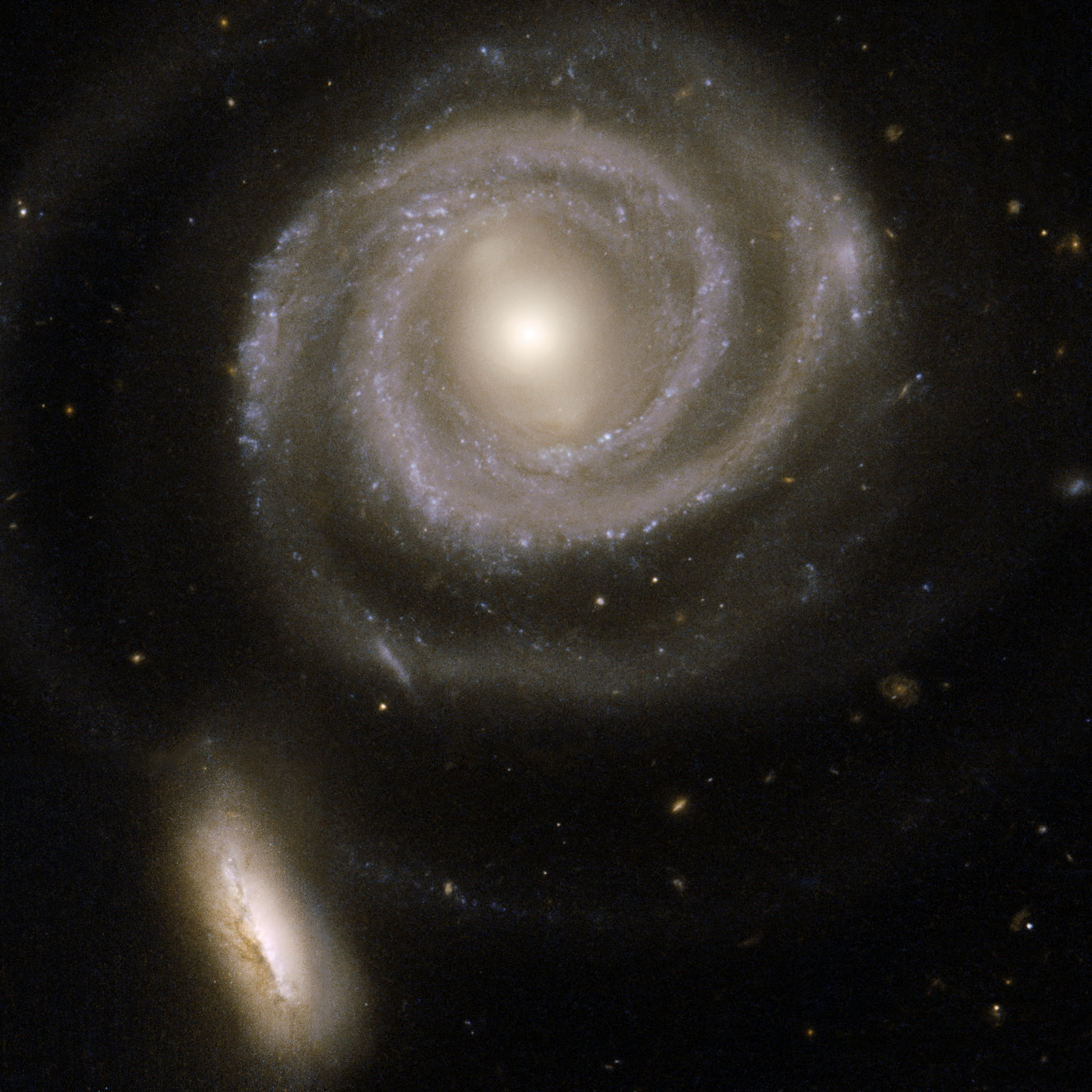
Arp 297: spiral (NGC 5754) /irregular galaxy (NGC 5752) pair

The long filaments in these systems are probably tidal tails or bridges that have been produced as the result of the gravitational interaction between the galaxies.

Arp number	Common name	Notes
294	NGC 3786, NGC 3788	Interacting galaxy pair
295	Arp 295	Interacting galaxy pair
296	Arp 296	
297	Arp 297	Interacting galaxies within a galaxy group

==== Unclassified objects ====
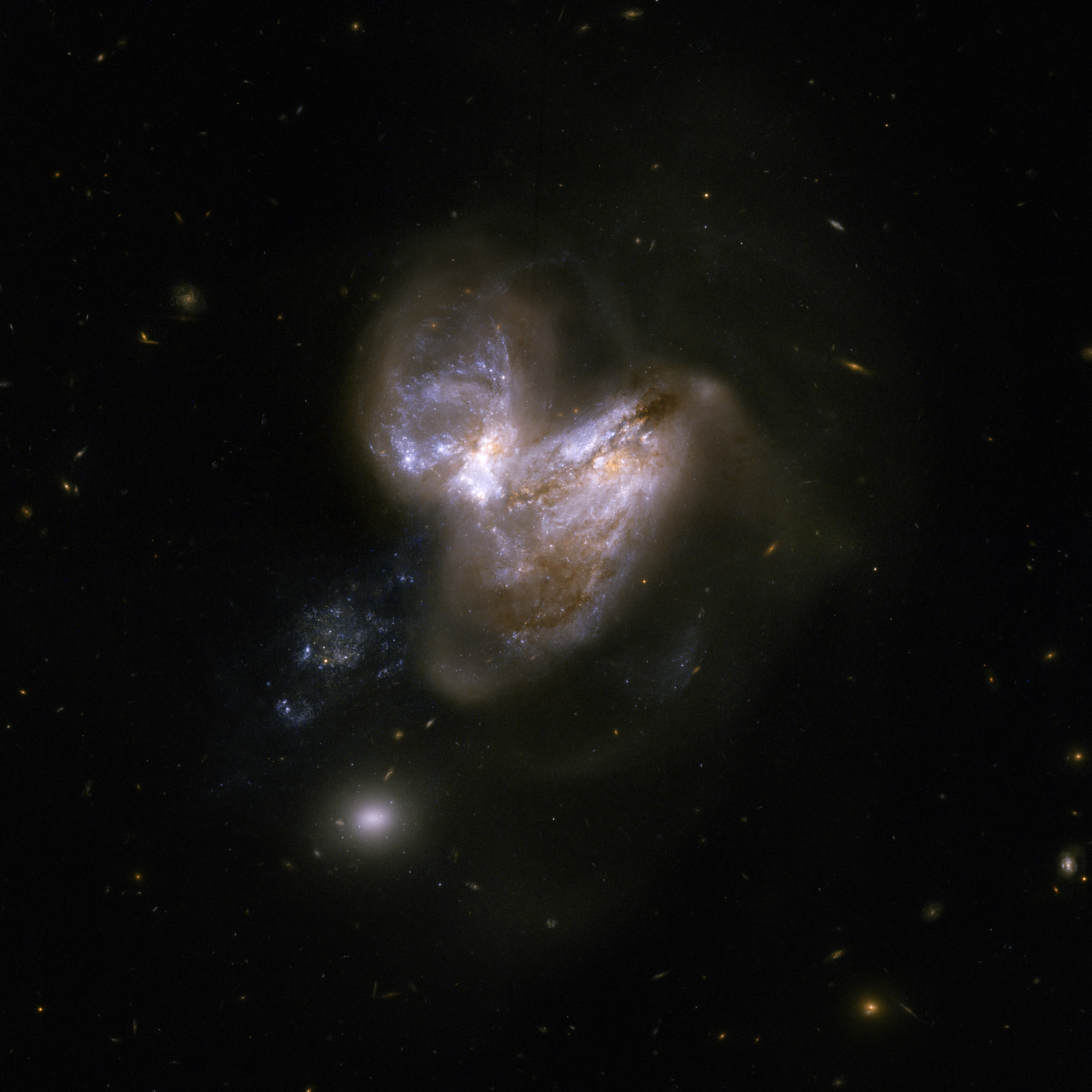
IC 694 and NGC 3690 (Arp 299), interacting galaxy pair

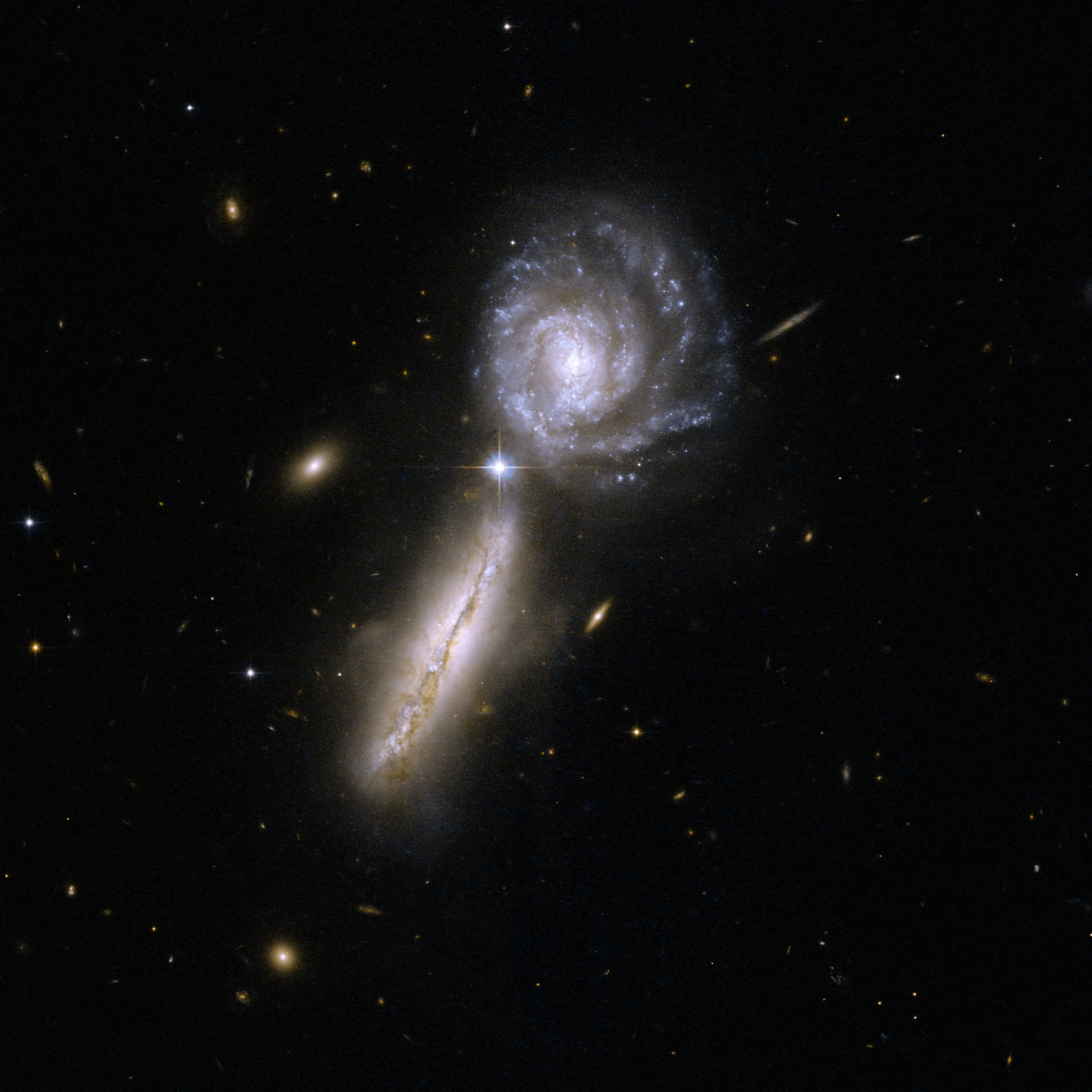
UGC 9618 (Arp 302), a pair of a face-on and an edge-on spiral galaxy

Arp did not give a subclassification for objects 298–310 in his atlas. These objects are mostly interacting galaxy pairs.

Arp number	Common name	Description
298	NGC 7469, IC 5283	Galaxy pair
299	Arp 299	Galaxy triplet
300	Arp 300	Galaxy group
301	UGC 6204, UGC 6207	Galaxy pair
302	UGC 9618	Galaxy pair
303	IC 563, IC 564	Galaxy pair
304	NGC 1241, NGC 1242	Galaxy pair
305	NGC 4016, NGC 4017	Galaxy pair
306	UGC 1102	Galaxy group with two galaxy pairs
307	NGC 2872, NGC 2874	Galaxy pair
308	NGC 545, NGC 547	Galaxy pair
309	NGC 942, NGC 943	Galaxy pair
310	IC 1259	Galaxy pair

==== Groups ====
Arp number	Common name	Description
311	IC 1258 and Companions	
312	MCG +08-31-004	
313	NGC 3994 + NGC 3995	
314	MCG -03-58-009 + MCG -03-58-010 + MCG -03-58-011	
315	NGC 2830 + NGC 2831 + NGC 2832	
316	NGC 3187 + NGC 3190 + NGC 3193	
317	Leo Triplet	
318	NGC 833 and companions	
319	Stephan's Quintet	
320	Copeland's Septet	
321	Hickson 40 A-E	

==== Chains ====
Arp number	Common name	Description
322	UGC 6527	
323	Hickson 98 A-D	
324	UGC 10143	
325	ESO601-G018A+B and MCG -04-52-014	
326	UGC 8610	
327	NGC 1875; Hickson 34 A-D	
328	UGC 9532; Hickson 72	
329	UGC 6514	
330	I Zw 167; MCG +09-27-094	
331	NGC 379 and companions (Pisces Cloud)	
332	NGC 1228 + NGC 1229 + NGC 1230 + IC 1892	

=== Miscellaneous ===
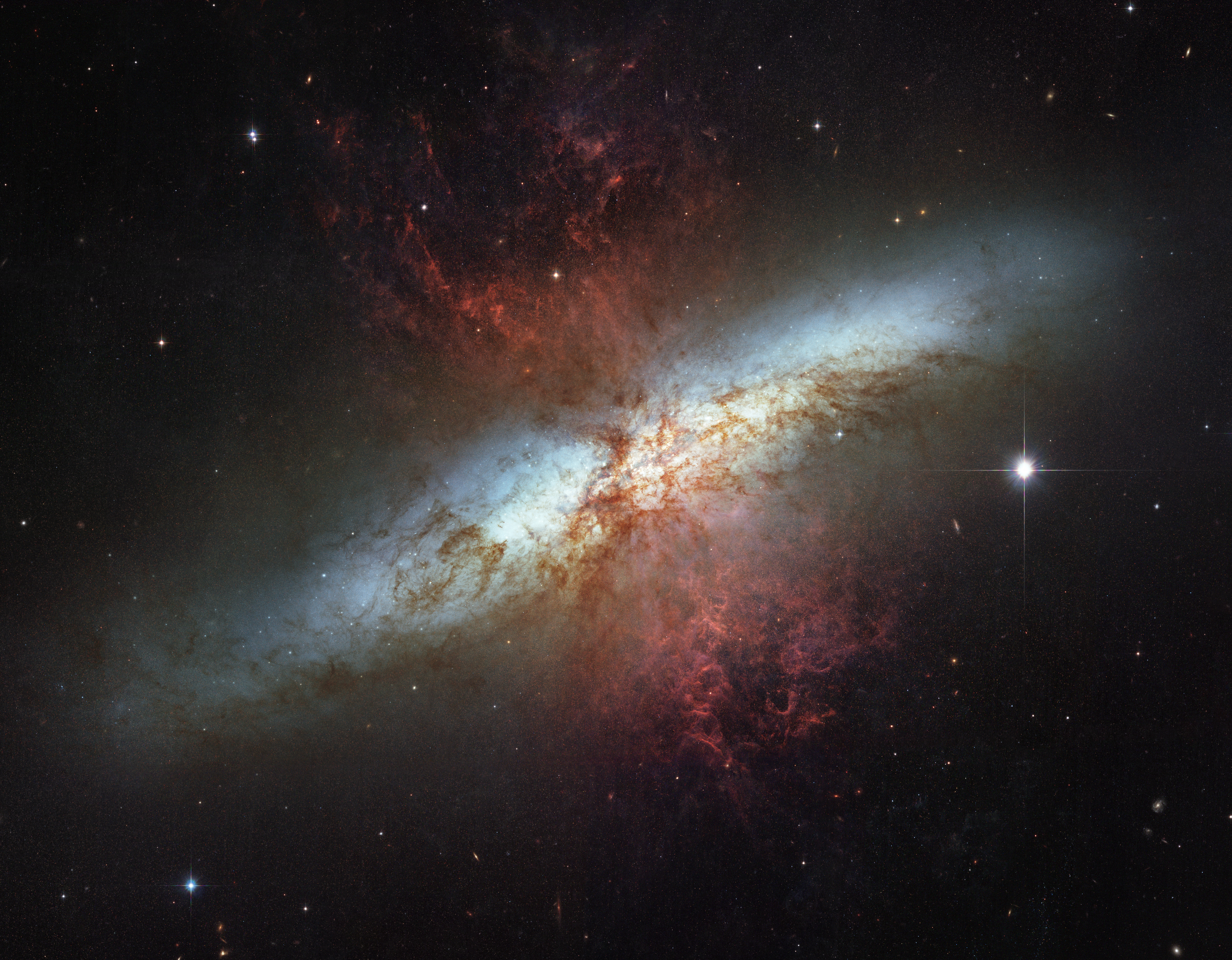
Hubble Space Telescope image of Messier 82

Arp number	Common name	Description
333	NGC 1024	
334	UGC 8498	
335	NGC 3509	
336	NGC 2685	
337	Messier 82	
338	PGC 3094767	

== Brightest Arp galaxies for amateur astronomers ==
Maynard Pittendreigh, an amateur astronomer and occasional writer, has compiled a list of the brightest Arp Galaxies that are most easily viewed by typical amateur astronomers. The galaxies on the list can be observed visually and do not require special photographic or imaging equipment. These include:

- Arp 26, also known as M101
- Arp 37, also known as M77
- Arp 76, also known as M90
- Arp 77
- Arp 85, also known as M51
- Arp 116, also known as M60
- Arp 120
- Arp 152, also known as M87
- Arp 153
- Arp 168, also known as M32
- Arp 244
- Arp 269
- Arp 270
- Arp 271
- Arp 281
- Arp 286
- Arp 317, also known as M65
- Arp 313
- Arp 337, also known as M82

== See also ==
- Index Catalogue (IC)
- Messier object (M)
- New General Catalogue (NGC)
- Uppsala General Catalogue (UGC)
