= NGC 1056 =

Galaxy in the constellation Aries

- NGC 1056 imaged by the Hubble Space Telescope

Observation data (J2000 epoch)
- Constellation: Aries
- Right ascension: 02^{h} 42^{m} 48.2738^{s}
- Declination: +28° 34′ 26.502″
- Redshift: 0.004920±0.00000334
- Heliocentric radial velocity: 1,475±1 km/s
- Distance: 91.16 ± 5.50 Mly (27.950 ± 1.685 Mpc)
- Apparent magnitude (V): 13.32

Characteristics
- Type: Sa?
- Size: ~68,100 ly (20.89 kpc) (estimated)
- Apparent size (V): 2.3′ × 1.1′

Other designations
- IRAS 02398+2821, 2MASX J02424828+2834273, UGC 2183, MCG +05-07-032, Mrk 1183, PGC 10272, CGCG 505-036

NGC 1056 is a spiral galaxy in the constellation of Aries. Its velocity with respect to the cosmic microwave background is 1,257±15 km/s, which corresponds to a Hubble distance of 60.5 ± 4.3 Mly (18.55 ± 1.32 Mpc). However, 10 non-redshift measurements give a much farther mean distance of 91.16 ± 5.50 Mly (27.950 ± 1.685 Mpc). It was discovered by German-British astronomer William Herschel on 26 October 1786.

NGC 1056 is a Seyfert II galaxy, i.e. it has a quasar-like nucleus with very high surface brightnesses whose spectra reveal strong, high-ionisation emission lines, but unlike quasars, the host galaxy is clearly detectable.

NGC 1056 is a galaxy whose nucleus shines in the ultraviolet range, and is thus listed in the Markarian catalogue as Mrk 1183.

== Supernova ==
One supernova has been observed in NGC 1056: SN 2011aq (Type II, mag. 18) was discovered by the Lick Observatory Supernova Search (LOSS) on 24 January 2011.

== See also ==
- List of NGC objects (1001–2000)
