= NGC 7585 =

Galaxy with a peculiar shape in the constellation Aquarius

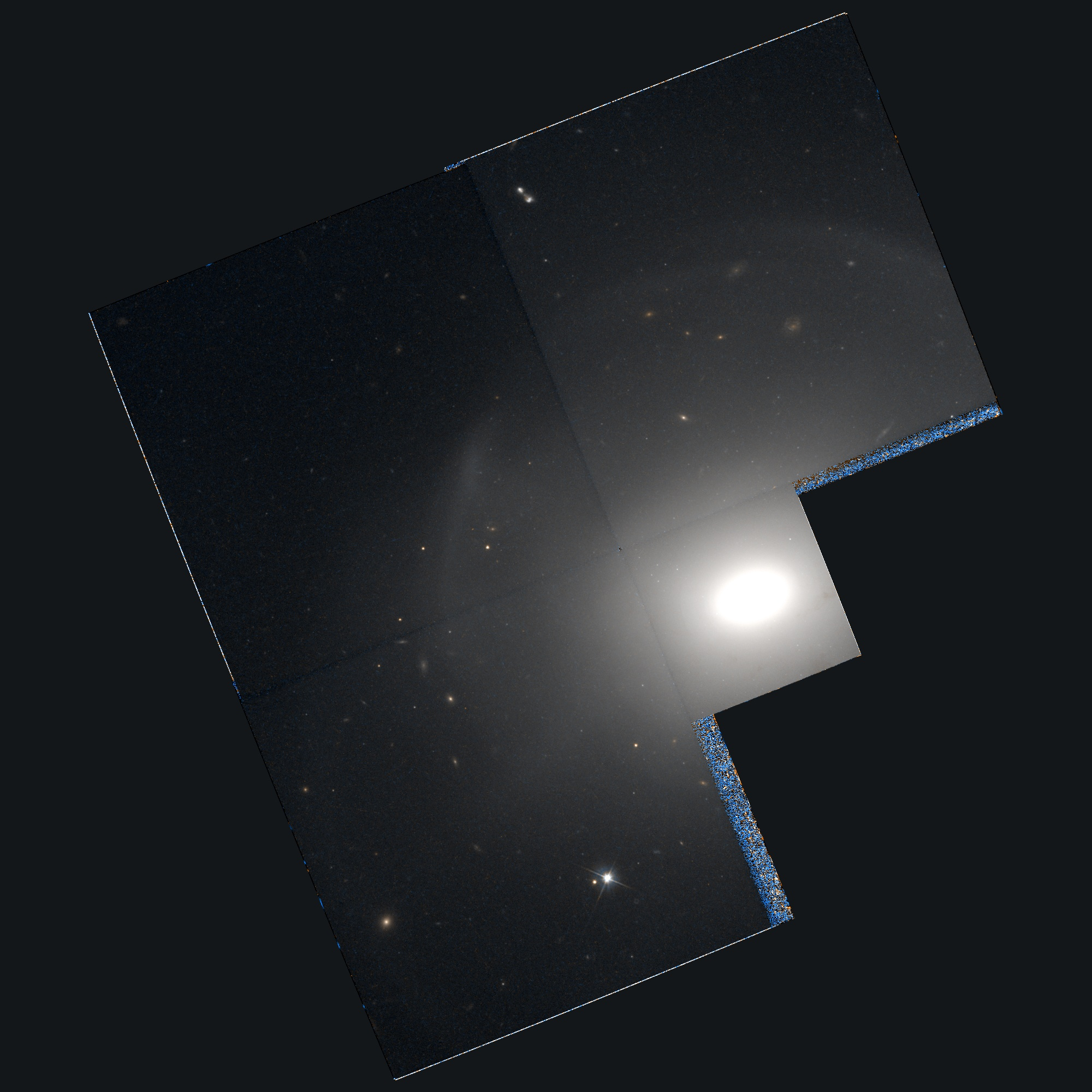
- Hubble Space Telescope (HST) image of the galaxy

Observation data (J2000 epoch)
- Constellation: Aquarius
- Right ascension: 23^{h} 18^{m} 01.3^{s}
- Declination: −04° 39′ 01″
- Redshift: 0.011805 ± 0.000003
- Heliocentric radial velocity: 3539 ± 1 km/s
- Distance: 145 million light years
- Apparent magnitude (V): 11.4

Characteristics
- Type: (R')SA(s)0+ pec
- Apparent size (V): 2.3′ × 2.0′

Other designations
- MCG -01-59-015, PGC 70986, Arp 223

NGC 7585 is a lenticular galaxy with a peculiar shape resulting from an interaction between two galaxies. It is located 145 million light years away in the constellation Aquarius which, given its apparent dimensions, means that NGC 7585 is about 100,000 light years across. It was discovered by William Herschel on September 20, 1784.

== Characteristics ==
NGC 7585 is a lenticular galaxy with shells. The disk of the galaxy is also present and distinct from the shells. The shells are irregular and have radial and loop form, and one of them looks like a faint outer arm. The shells are probably the result of a merger that took place over a billion years ago. The shells are bluer than the rest of the galaxy and suggestive of a spiral galaxy taking part in a merger, while other features seem to be part of the accreted galaxy. The upper limit of the molecular gas mass based on CO imaging is 10^{7.5} M_{☉}.

== Nearby galaxies ==
Two galaxies appear near NGC 7585. NGC 7576 is located 10.7 arcminutes southwest of NGC 7585, while NGC 7592 is located 15.2 arcminutes to the northeast. NGC 7576 is at a similar redshift with NGC 7585, but its normal shape indicates it has not interacted recently with NGC 7585. On the other hand, NGC 7592 appears disturbed, however it has double the redshift.

== Gallery ==
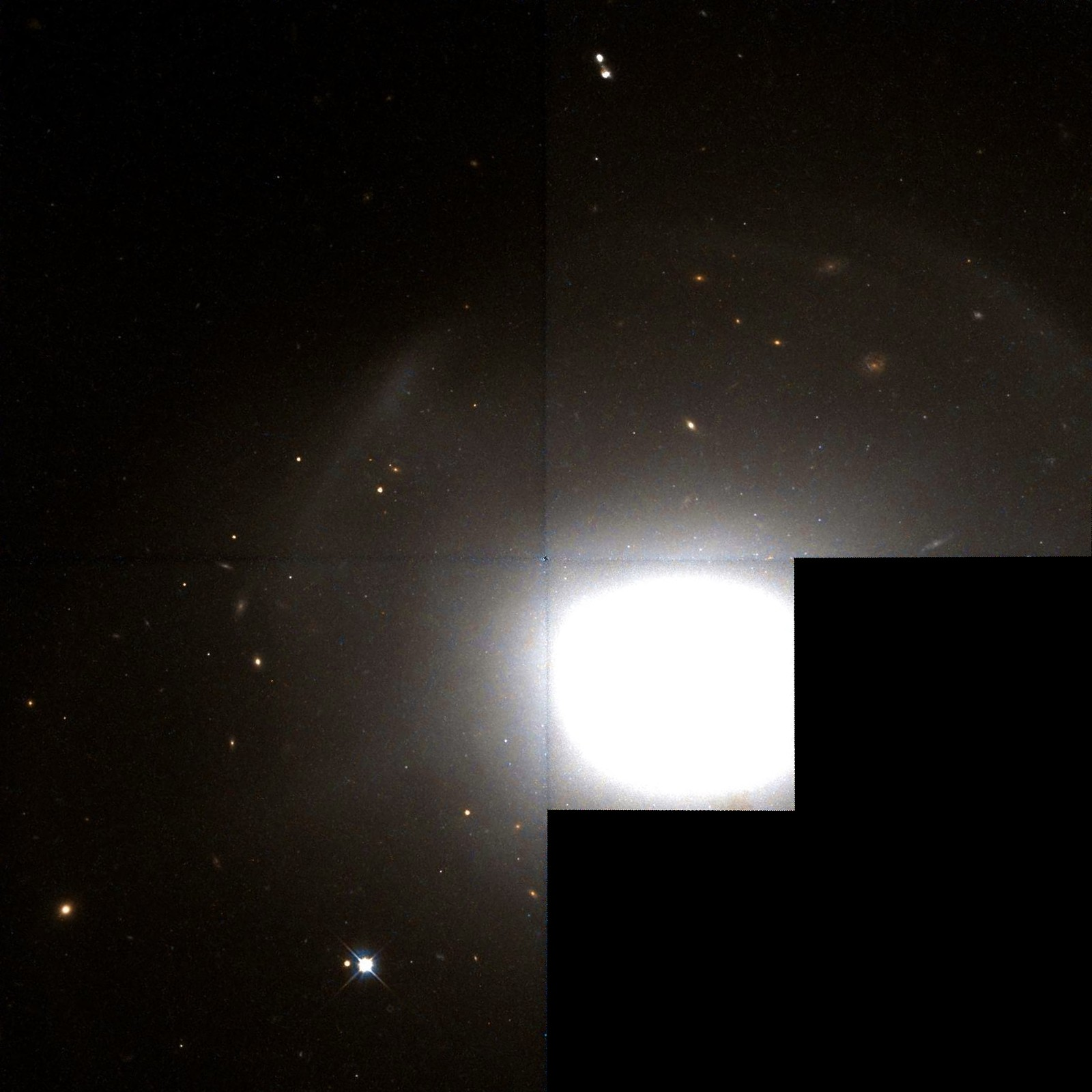
NGC 7585 by Hubble Space Telescope

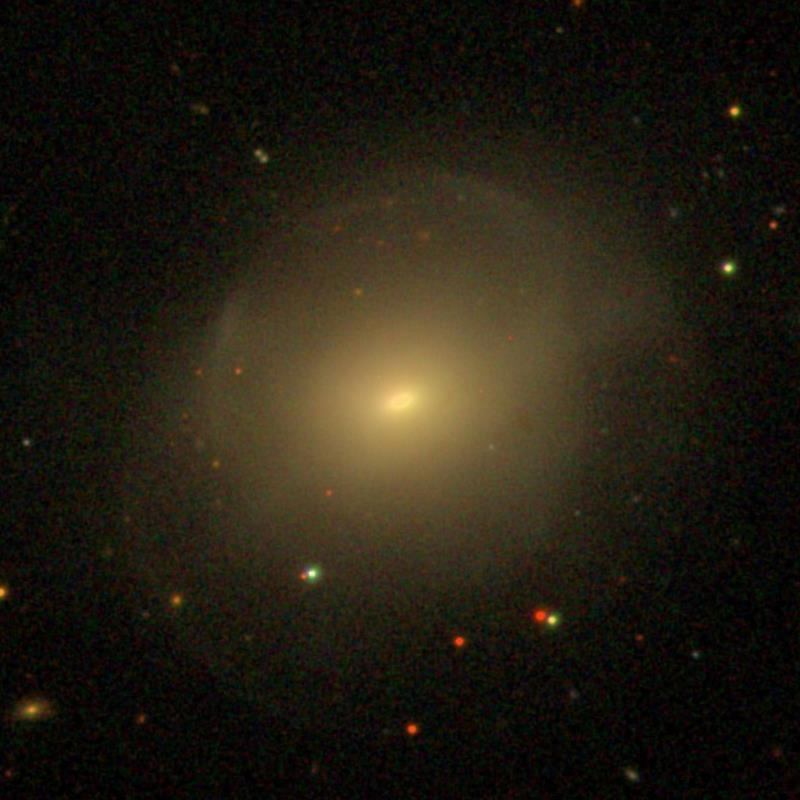
NGC 7585 by SDSS
