= NGC 7592 =

Interacting galaxy system in the constellation Aquarius

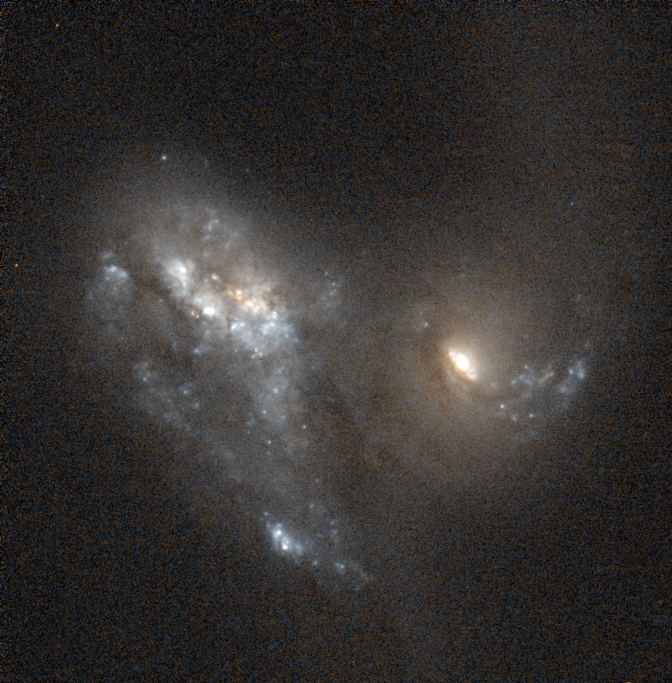
- Hubble Space Telescope (HST) image of the galaxy

Observation data (J2000 epoch)
- Constellation: Aquarius
- Right ascension: 23^{h} 18^{m} 22.2^{s}
- Declination: −04° 25′ 01″
- Redshift: 0.024444 ± 0.000113
- Heliocentric radial velocity: 7,328 ± 34 km/s
- Distance: 306 Mly (95 Mpc)
- Apparent magnitude (V): 13.5

Characteristics
- Type: S0+ pec
- Apparent size (V): 1.2′ × 0.9′
- Notable features: mergering galaxy pair

Other designations
- MCG -01-59-017, VV 731, PGC 70999, Mrk 928

NGC 7592 is an interacting galaxy system located 300 million light years away in the constellation Aquarius. It was discovered by William Herschel on September 20, 1784. The total infrared luminosity is 10^{11.33} L_{☉}, and thus it is categorised as a luminous infrared galaxy. One of the galaxies hosts a type 2 Seyfert nucleus.

== Characteristics ==
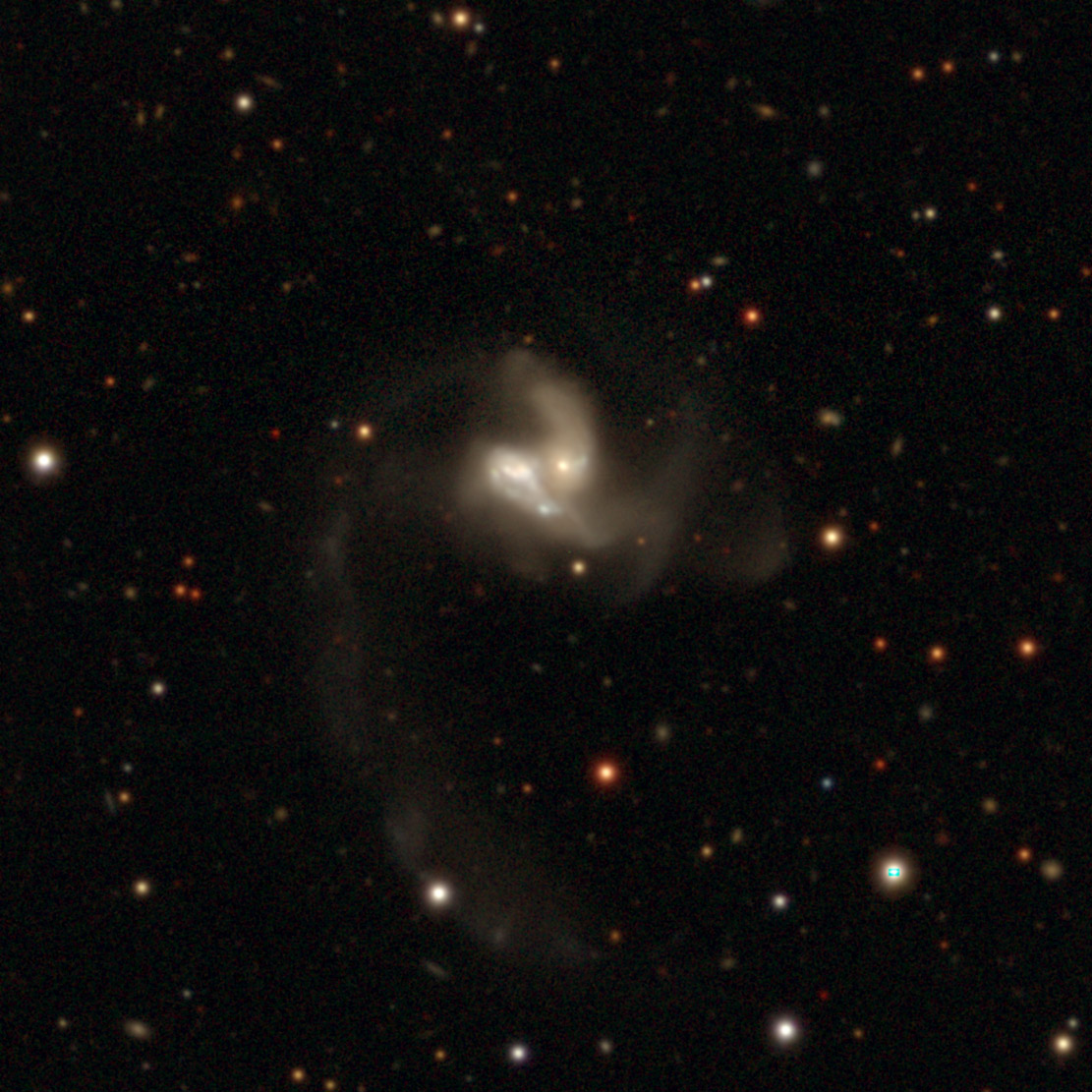
Wide field view of NGC 7592 with the legacy surveys

NGC 7592 is an interacting galaxy system and ongoing galaxy merger between an early type galaxy and a late type spiral galaxy. The system has at least two faint diffuse tidal tails, with the longer one extending about 2 arcminutes towards the south. Based on the total infrared luminosity of the galaxy (10^{11.33} L_{☉}), NGC 7592 is categorised as a luminous infrared galaxy. Luminous infrared galaxies are characterised by increased star formation. The star formation rate of NGC 7592 is estimated to be 26 M_{☉} per year.

=== Nuclei ===
The two galactic nuclei, whose projected separation is 14 arcseconds, have nearly equal luminance in near infrared imaging. The west nucleus is known to be a Seyfert, a type of active galactic nucleus (AGN). Based on its spectral lines, it has been categorised as type 1.9 or type 2. The most accepted theory for the energy source of AGNs is the presence of an accretion disk around a supermassive black hole. It has been suggested that around the Seyfert nucleus lies a rotating, star-forming knotty disk or ring with a diameter of about 1.5 kpc viewed nearly edge-on, and which is perpendicular to the galactic plane. It is possible that it is material accreted from the other galaxy. The east nucleus features a complex structure, probably due to extinction. There is diffuse X-ray emission around both nuclei.

At the end of one tidal tail lies a bright source in visual light that is identified as NGC 7592C. It is located about 12 arcseconds south from the mid-distance of the two other nuclei. It has been suggested that it is another galaxy taking part in the merger, however its infrared emission is fainter than the other two nuclei and it has not been detected in x-rays by Chandra X-ray Observatory. Its spectrum, both optical and infrared, suggests it is an extranuclear star formation region. Based on its kinematics, the south condensation is part of the spiral galaxy.

== See also ==
- NGC 5256 - a similar interacting galactic pair
