= NGC 788 =

Galaxy in the constellation Cetus

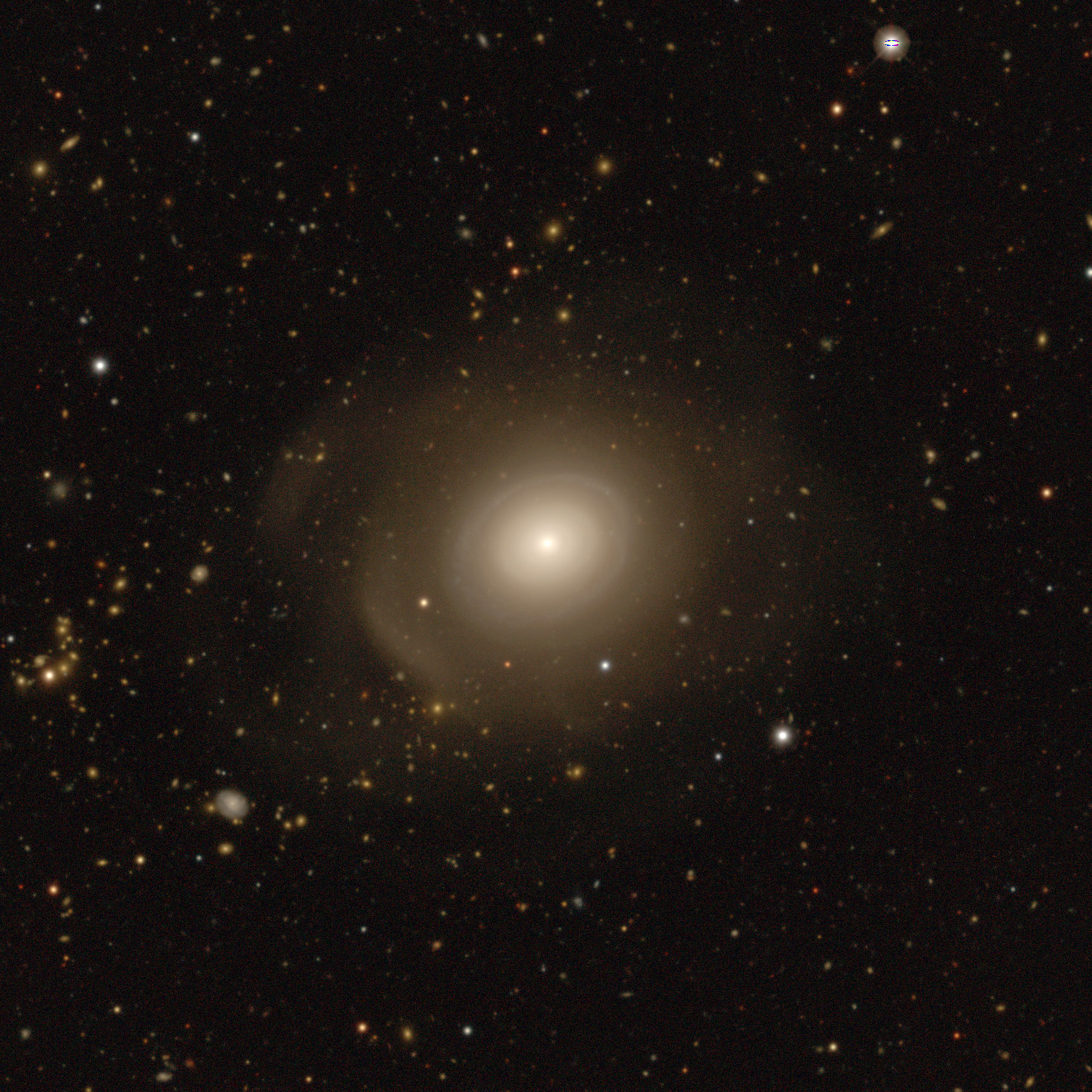
- NGC 788 imaged by legacy surveys

Observation data (J2000 epoch)
- Constellation: Cetus
- Right ascension: 02^{h} 01^{m} 06.4473^{s}
- Declination: −06° 48′ 55.861″
- Redshift: 0.013603±0.000093
- Heliocentric radial velocity: 4078±28 km/s
- Distance: 189.4 ± 13.4 Mly (58.08 ± 4.10 Mpc)
- Group or cluster: NGC 788 Group (LGG 44)
- Apparent magnitude (V): 12.76

Characteristics
- Type: SA0/a?(s)
- Size: ~108,400 ly (33.25 kpc) (estimated)
- Apparent size (V): 1.6′ × 1.3′

Other designations
- IRAS F01586-0703, MCG -01-06-025, PGC 7656

NGC 788 is a lenticular galaxy located in the constellation Cetus. Its velocity with respect to the cosmic microwave background is 3938 ± 30 km/s, which corresponds to a Hubble distance of 189.4 ± 13.4 Mly (58.08 ± 4.10 Mpc). It was discovered in a sky survey by Wilhelm Herschel on September 10, 1785.

Studies of NGC 788 indicate that it, while itself being classified as a Seyfert 2, contains an obscured Seyfert 1 nucleus, following the detection of a broad Hα emission line in the polarized flux spectrum. The observation also indicated the lowest radio luminosities observed in an obscured Seyfert 1.

== Supernova ==
One supernova has been observed in NGC 788: SN 1998dj (Type Ia, mag. 16.1) was discovered by the Lick Observatory Supernova Search (LOSS) on 8 August 1998.

== NGC 788 Group ==
NGC 788 is the largest and brightest galaxy in a group of at least five galaxies that bears its name. The other four galaxies in the NGC 788 group (also known as LGG 44) are IC 183, NGC 829, NGC 830, and NGC 842.

== Image gallery ==
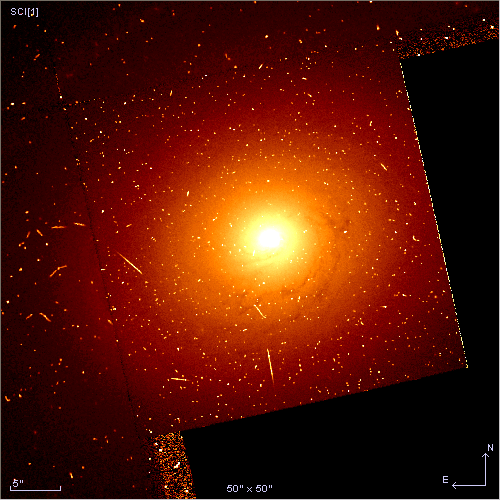
Center of NGC 788 imaged by the Hubble Space Telescope

== See also ==
- List of NGC objects (1–1000)
