= NGC 2599 =

Galaxy in the constellation Cancer

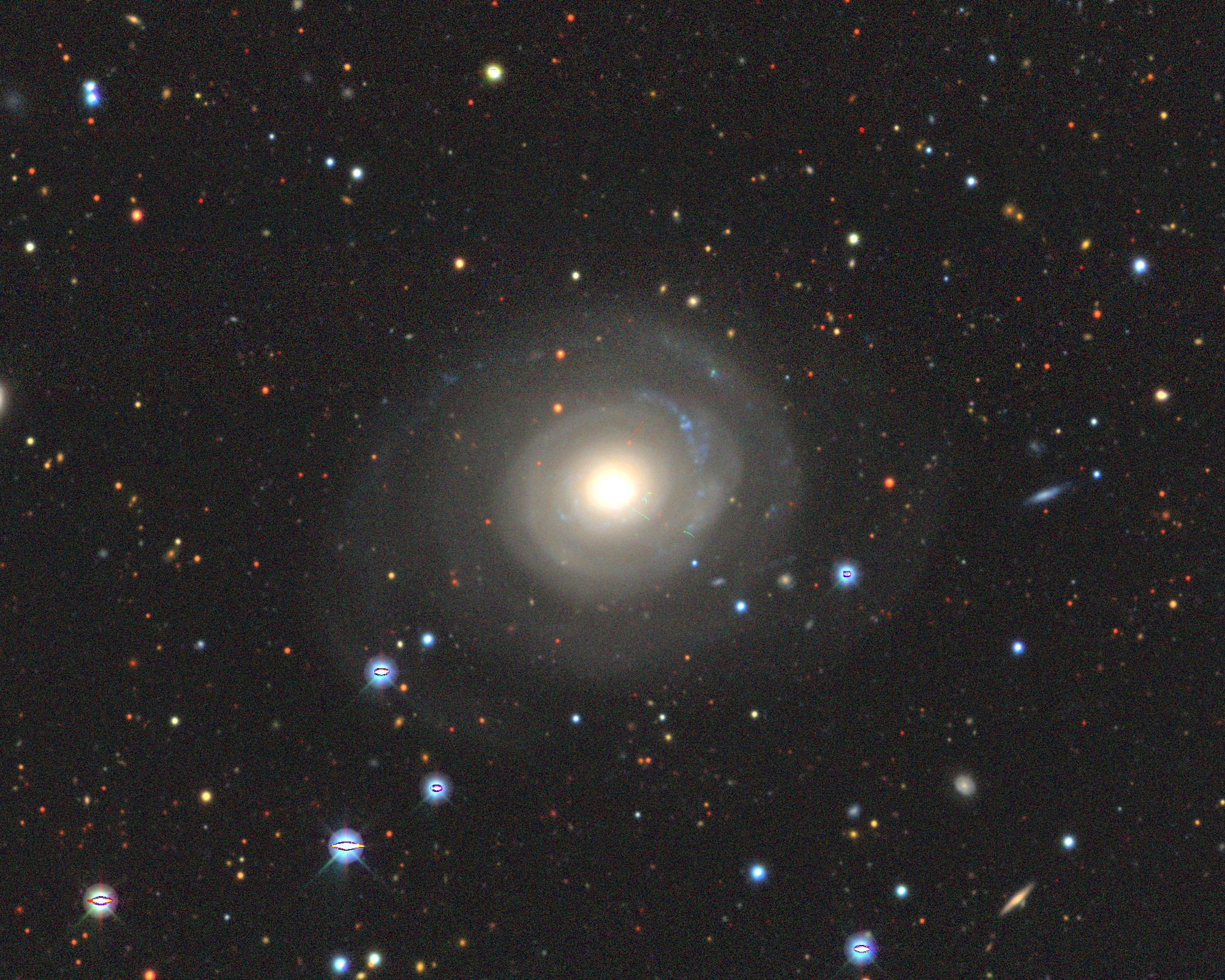
- NGC 2599 imaged by Legacy Surveys

Observation data (J2000 epoch)
- Constellation: Cancer
- Right ascension: 08^{h} 32^{m} 11.3248^{s}
- Declination: +22° 33′ 37.967″
- Redshift: 0.015857±0.00000233
- Heliocentric radial velocity: 4,754±1 km/s
- Distance: 240.4 ± 16.9 Mly (73.70 ± 5.17 Mpc)
- Apparent magnitude (V): 13.08

Characteristics
- Type: SAa
- Size: ~182,100 ly (55.82 kpc) (estimated)
- Apparent size (V): 1.9′ × 1.7′

Other designations
- IRAS 08292+2243, 2MASS J08321132+2233380, UGC 4458, MCG +04-20-067, Mrk 389, PGC 23941, CGCG 119-122

NGC 2599 is a large spiral galaxy in the constellation of Cancer. Its velocity with respect to the cosmic microwave background is 4,997±17 km/s, which corresponds to a Hubble distance of 240.4 ± 16.9 Mly (73.70 ± 5.17 Mpc). It was discovered by German-British astronomer William Herschel on 16 November 1784.

NGC 2599 is a LINER galaxy, i.e. a galaxy whose nucleus has an emission spectrum characterized by broad lines of weakly ionized atoms.

NGC 2599 is a galaxy whose nucleus shines brightly in the ultraviolet and is listed in the Markarian catalogue as Mrk 389.

== Supernova ==
One supernova has been observed in NGC 2599: SN 1965P (type unknown, mag. 15.7) was discovered by Howard S. Gates on 6 March 1965.

== See also ==
- List of NGC objects (2001–3000)
