= NGC 553 =

Galaxy in the constellation Pisces

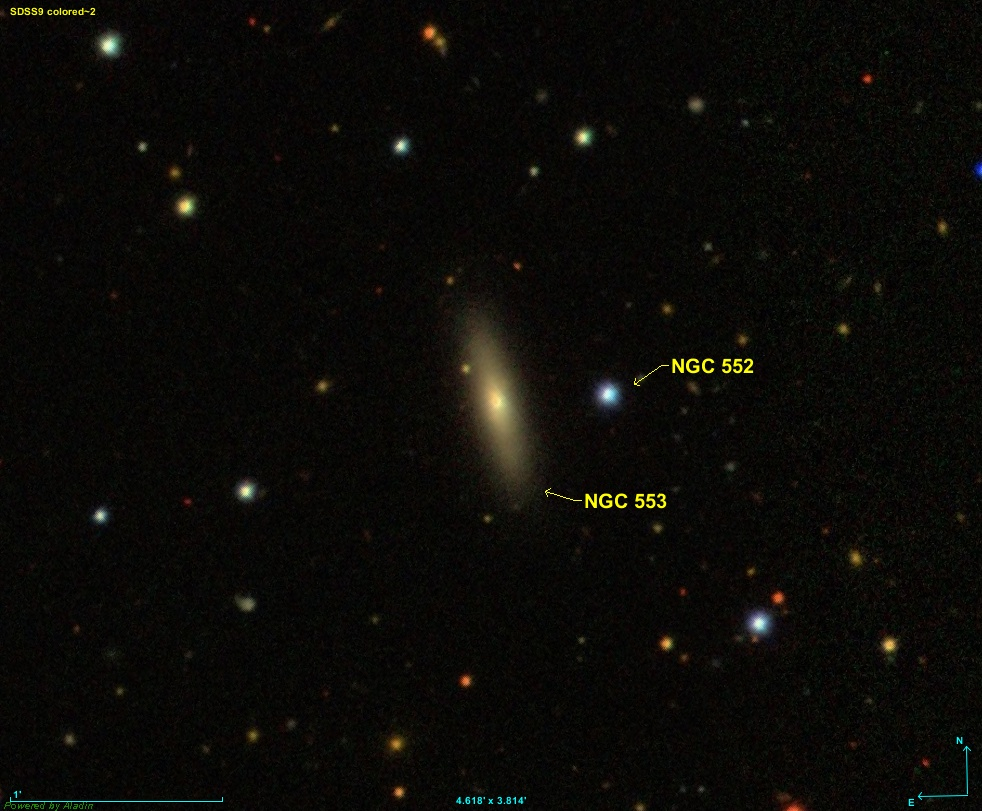
- SDSS image of NGC 553

Observation data (J2000 epoch)
- Constellation: Pisces
- Right ascension: 01h 26m 12s
- Declination: 33° 24’ 18”
- Redshift: 0.017068
- Heliocentric radial velocity: 5117 +/- 30 km/s
- Distance: 219 Mly
- Apparent magnitude (B): 15

Characteristics
- Type: S0
- Size: 89,000 ly (estimated)
- Apparent size (V): 0.5' x 0.3'

Other designations
- PGC 5333, Mrk 1155, AGC 110325, CGCG 502-084

NGC 553 is a lenticular galaxy recorded in the New General Catalogue. It is located 219 million light-years towards the direction of the constellation Pisces on the sky. It is an S0 type galaxy. It was discovered by British astronomer William Herschel in 1784 using a 47.5 cm (18.7 in) reflector.

== See also ==
- List of NGC objects (1–1000)
