= NGC 638 =

Galaxy in the constellation Pisces

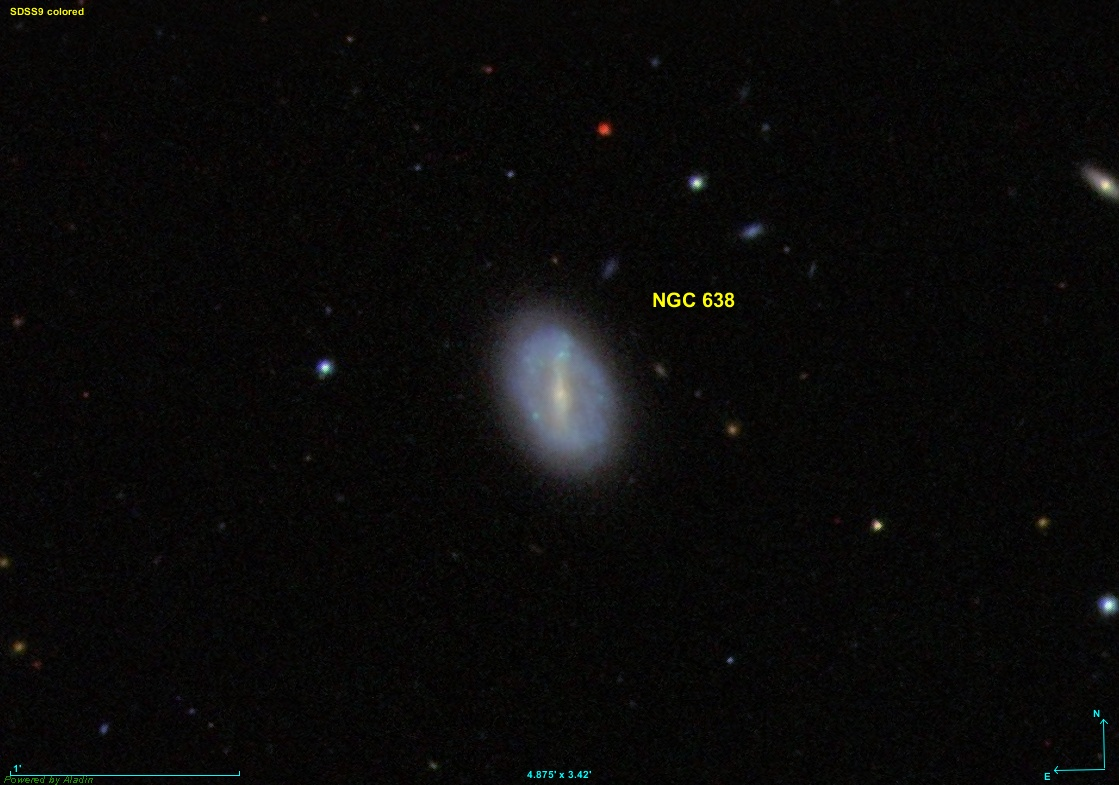
- The barred spiral galaxy NGC 638

Observation data (J2000 epoch)
- Constellation: Pisces
- Right ascension: 01^{h} 39^{m} 37.8^{s}
- Declination: 07° 14′ 14″
- Redshift: +0.010547±0.000007
- Heliocentric radial velocity: 3,162 km/s
- Distance: 42.24 ± 2.97 Mpc (137.8 ± 9.7 Mly)
- Apparent magnitude (V): 13.8
- Apparent magnitude (B): 14.5
- Surface brightness: 12.81 mag/am

Characteristics
- Type: Barred spiral galaxy
- Size: 47,200 ly (24.48 kpc)
- Apparent size (V): 0.8 arcminites × 0.5 arcminites

Other designations
- PGC 6145, Mrk 1003, CGCG 412-11

NGC 638 is a barred spiral galaxy located in the constellation of Pisces. Its velocity speed to the cosmic microwave background is 2,864± 21 km/s, which corresponds to a Hubble's law of 42.2 ± 3.0 Mpc (~138 million light-year). NGC 638 was discovered by American astronomer Lewis A. Swift in 1886.

NGC 638 has a broad Hydrogen line. NGC 638 is a galaxy whose nucleus shines in the ultraviolet domain. It is listed in the Markarian catalogue under the code Mrk 1003 (MK 1003).

To date, two non-redshift measurements give a distance of 55.330 0 ± 1.273 Mpc (~180 million light-year), which is outside the Hubble distance values. Note that the NASA/IPAC database calculates the diameter of a galaxy using the average value of independent measurements, when available, and that consequently the diameter of NGC 638 could be about 11.1 kpc (~36,200 light-year) if the Hubble's law were used to calculate it.

Location of NGC 638

== NGC 645 Group ==
NGC 638 is part of the NGC 645 group which includes at least five galaxies. The other three galaxies in this group are NGC 632, UGC 1137 and UGC 1172.

== See also ==
=== Related article ===
- List of NGC objects (1–1000)

=== Other links ===
- NGC 638 on spider.seds.org
- NGC 638 on the LEDA database
- NGC 638 on WikiSky
- NGC 638 on the site of Professor C. Seligman
