= NGC 5996 =

Spiral galaxy in the constellation Serpens

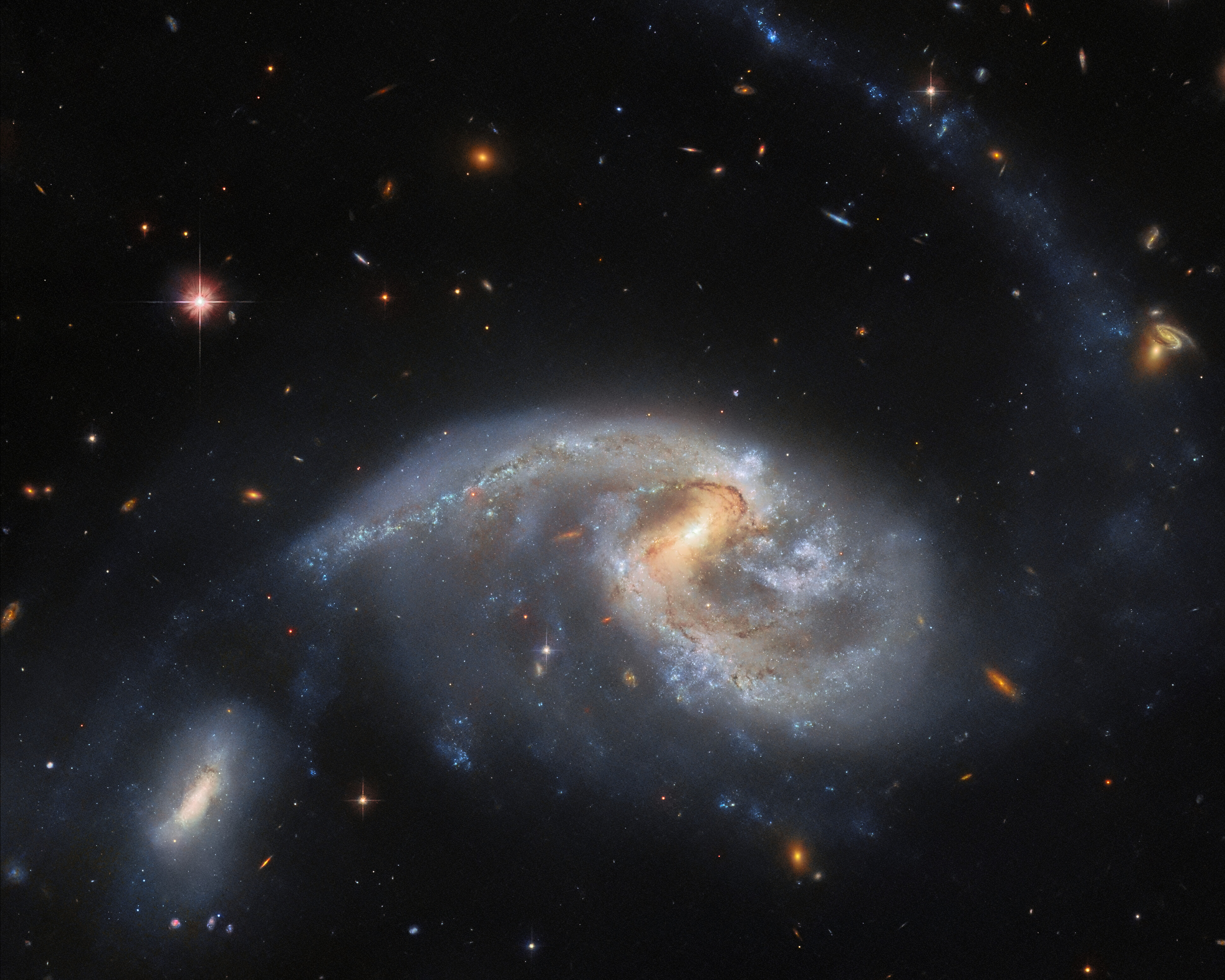
- NGC 5996 by Hubble Space Telescope

Observation data (J2000 epoch)
- Constellation: Serpens
- Right ascension: 15^{h} 46^{m} 58.9^{s}
- Declination: +17° 53′ 03″
- Redshift: 0.010998 ± 0.000007
- Heliocentric radial velocity: 3,297 ± 2 km/s
- Distance: 127 ± 15 Mly (38.9 ± 4.6 Mpc)
- Apparent magnitude (V): 12.5

Characteristics
- Type: SBc
- Apparent size (V): 1.58′ × 0.69′
- Notable features: Interacting galaxy

Other designations
- UGC 10033, Arp 72, VV 16a, MRK 691, MCG +03-40-039, IRAS 15447+1802, PGC 56023

NGC 5996 is a barred spiral galaxy in the constellation Serpens. The galaxy lies about 125 million light years away from Earth, which means, given its apparent dimensions, that NGC 5996 is approximately 65,000 light years across. It was discovered by William Herschel on March 21, 1784.

NGC 5996 forms a pair with a smaller companion galaxy, NGC 5994, which lies at a distance of about 40,000 light years. The galaxy pair is known as Arp 72. The interaction of the two galaxies has created a long and faint tidal tail about 3.8 arcminutes long curving away from the northern edge of the disk of NGC 5996 towards the east and south. A hydrogen bridge has been observed between the two galaxies and hydrogen emission is also observed west of NGC 5994. The interaction has possibly induced star formation activity in NGC 5996 both in the nucleus and the disk, with a star formation rate of 1.43 M_{☉} per year. The brightest star cluster in the galaxy is estimated to be 5 million years old.

The galaxy pair is part of the NGC 5996 Group, which also includes UGC 10044 and IC 1135.

One supernova has been observed in NGC 5996, ASASSN-15db, which was discovered when it had an apparent magnitude of 16.7 and it was categorised as a Type Ia supernova five days before maximum.
