= Markarian 817 =

Barred spiral galaxy in the constellation Draco

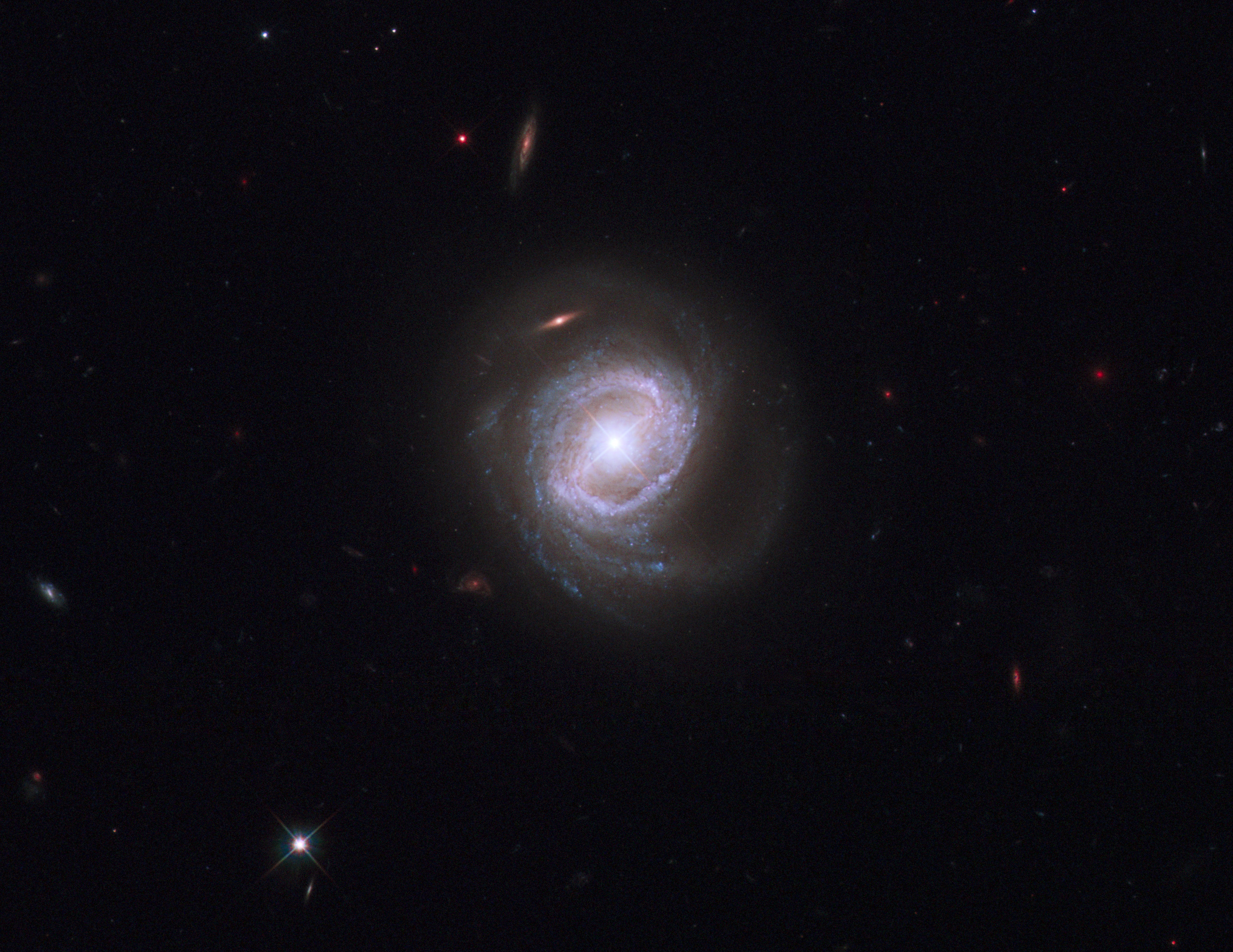
- Mrk 817 taken by Hubble Space Telescope

Observation data (J2000 epoch)
- Constellation: Draco
- Right ascension: 14h 36m 22.068s
- Declination: +58d 47m 39.38s
- Redshift: 0.031328
- Heliocentric radial velocity: 9,392 km/s
- Distance: 456 Mly (140 Mpc)
- Apparent magnitude (V): 14.6

Characteristics
- Type: SBc, Sy 1.5
- Size: 28.69 kpc (93,500 ly) (diameter; D_{25} isophote)
- Apparent size (V): 0.6' x 0.6'
- Notable features: Seyfert galaxy

Other designations
- UGC 9412, SBS 1434+590, CGCG 296-015, IRAS 14349+5900, PGC 52202

Markarian 817 is a barred spiral galaxy located in the constellation Draco. It is located 456 million light-years from Earth, which, given its apparent dimensions, means that Markarian 817 is about 94,000 light-years across. It is a Seyfert galaxy.

== Features ==
The nucleus of Markarian 817 is found to be active. It is classified as a Seyfert 1.5 or Seyfert 1.2 galaxy by the recent work done, according to Koss et al. 2017. The nucleus sits in a barred spiral galaxy, close to face-on and not typical for optically selected unobscured Seyferts. There is evidence of dust along the galaxy's bar according to the Hubble image.

A study conducted in February 2011, shows that the active core is not fixed as it shows strong variabilities in X-rays and ultraviolet rays (UV). The X-ray luminosity varies by a factor of ~40 over 20 years, while the UV continuum/emission lines vary at the most by a factor of ~2.3 over the past 30 years.

A 2021 study shows that the X-ray spectrum in Markarian 817 is highly absorbed and there are new blueshifted, broad, and narrow UV absorption lines, suggesting a dust-free, ionized obscurer that is located in the inner broad-line region, partially covering the central source. During the first 55 days, scientists observed there is a de-coupling of the UV continuum and the UV broad emission line variability. The next 42 days of the campaign showed the correlation recovering, as Markarian 817 entered the less obscured state. The short C IV and Lyα lags suggest that the accretion disk extends beyond the UV broad-line region.

Markarian 817 has become a notable target of the AGN STORM 2 project, in which a group of astronomers led by Edward M. Cackett from the Wayne State University in Detroit, monitored the galaxy with the Neil Gehrels Swift Observatory for 15 months, during which they obtained observations in X-rays and six ultraviolet/optical filters to shed more light on Markarian 817.

Further observations done in 2022 showed that the source flux in Markarian 817 has declined compared to that recorded at a prior point during the 19-year mission. From the deep XMM Newton and NuSTAR observations, the spectra presents a complex X-ray wind which consists of neutral and ionized absorption zones. Three velocity components are detected from the part of the structured ultra-fast outflow with v/c = 0.043 (+0.007,-0.003), v/c = 0.079 (+0.003,-0.0008), and v/c = 0.074 (+0.004,-0.005). These suggest that the wind likely arises at radii that are smaller compared to the optical broad line region.

== Black hole ==
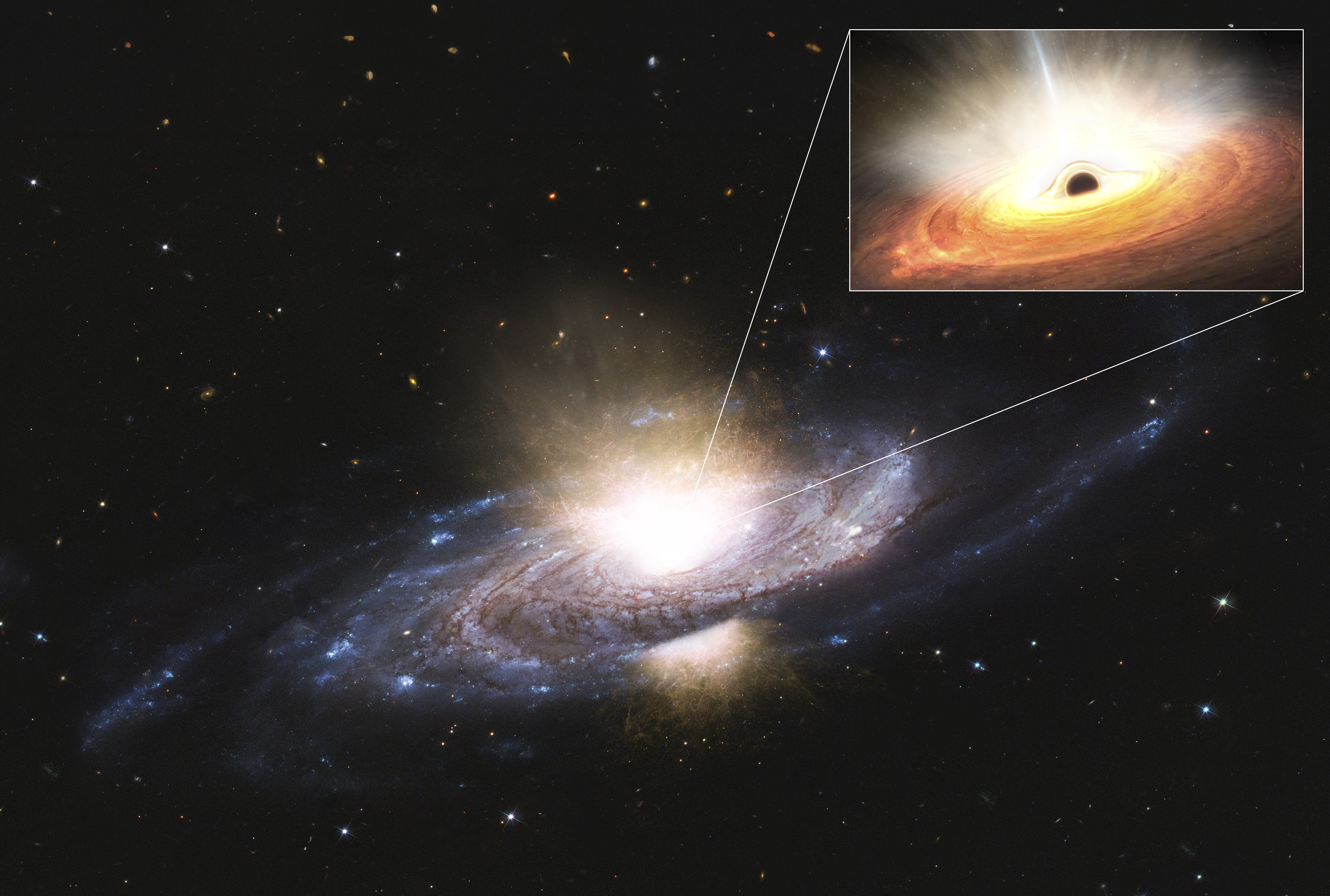
An artist's impression of ultra-fast winds blasting out from the center of Markarian 817

The central black hole in Markarian 817 has an estimated mass of (4.9±0.8)×10^{7} solar masses according to Peterson et al. 2004. The winds of Mrk 817 move at many millions of kilometers per hour, thus cleaning up interstellar gas from their region of space. This cuts off the rate of production of new stars being formed in Markarian 817, leaving very little matter to feed the accretion disk. This suggests that the black hole is experiencing a "temper tantrum" and is responsible for shaping its host galaxy.

In an article in which Markarian 817 and another Seyfert galaxy NGC 7469 is studied, it is revealed both AGNs displayed time lags in the broad emission line, including H, He, HeI and HeII and also the FeII for Markarian 817 with respect to the varying continuum at 5100~Å. From the relationship of line widths and time lags, both galaxies showed that the broad-line regions (BLR) dynamics are consistent with the viral predication. Data provided from Markarian 817 showed almost the same kinetic structures, in which the time lags in the red wing is larger compared to the time lags in the blue wing. This indicates the BLR of Keplerian motion seemly has outflowing components during the monitoring period.

== See also ==
- Markarian 590 – a Seyfert galaxy in Cetus
- Markarian 273 – a Seyfert and ultraluminous infrared galaxy
