= NGC 632 =

Galaxy in the constellation Pisces

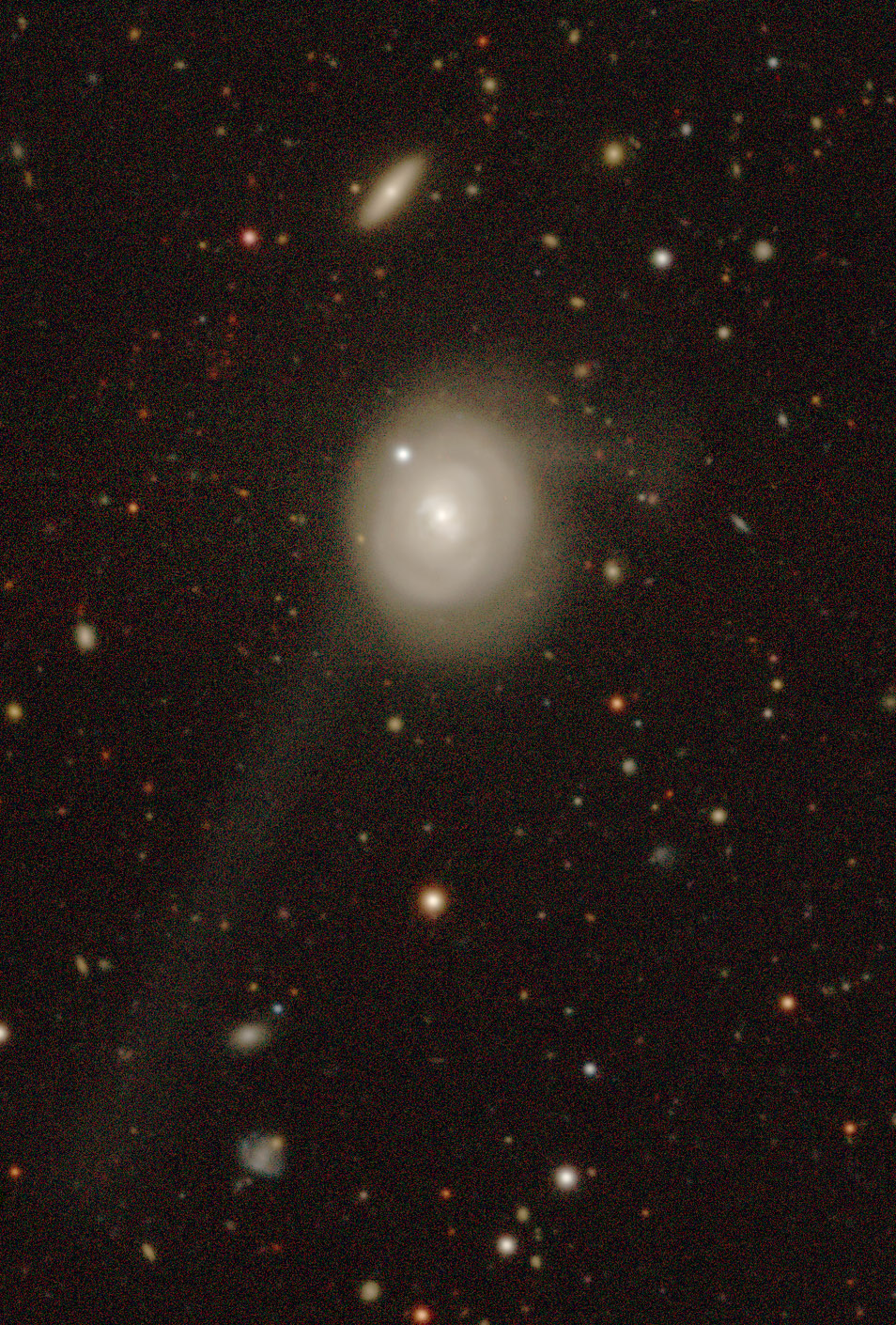
- NGC 632 imaged by Legacy Surveys

Observation data (J2000 epoch)
- Constellation: Pisces
- Right ascension: 01^{h} 37^{m} 17.5512^{s}
- Declination: +05° 52′ 38.550″
- Redshift: 0.010567±0.0000200
- Heliocentric radial velocity: 3,168±6 km/s
- Distance: 125.65 ± 6.74 Mly (38.525 ± 2.066 Mpc)
- Group or cluster: NGC 645 Group (LGG 28)
- Apparent magnitude (V): 12.4

Characteristics
- Type: S0
- Size: ~62,100 ly (19.05 kpc) (estimated)
- Apparent size (V): 1.0′ × 0.8′

Other designations
- IRAS 01346+0537, 2MASX J01371753+0552389, UGC 1157, MCG +01-05-010, Mrk 1002, PGC 6007, CGCG 412-008

NGC 632 is a lenticular galaxy in the constellation of Pisces. Its velocity with respect to the cosmic microwave background is 2,868±22 km/s, which corresponds to a Hubble distance of 138.0 ± 9.7 Mly (42.30 ± 2.98 Mpc). However, eight non-redshift measurements give a closer mean distance of 125.65 ± 6.74 Mly (38.525 ± 2.066 Mpc). It was discovered by British astronomer John Herschel on 24 September 1830.

NGC 632 has a possible active galactic nucleus, i.e. it has a compact region at the center of a galaxy that emits a significant amount of energy across the electromagnetic spectrum, with characteristics indicating that this luminosity is not produced by the stars.

NGC 632 has a nucleus which shines in the ultraviolet range, and is thus listed in Markarian's catalogue as Mrk 1002.

== NGC 645 Group ==
NGC 632 is a member of the NGC 645 group (also known as LGG 28). This group has 5 galaxies, including NGC 638, NGC 645, UGC 1137, and UGC 1172.

== Supernova ==
One supernova has been observed in NGC 632:

- SN 1998es (Type Ia-pec, mag. 14.6) was discovered by the Lick Observatory Supernova Search (LOSS) on 13 November 1998.

== See also ==
- List of NGC objects (1–1000)
