= NGC 354 =

Barred spiral galaxy in the constellation Pisces

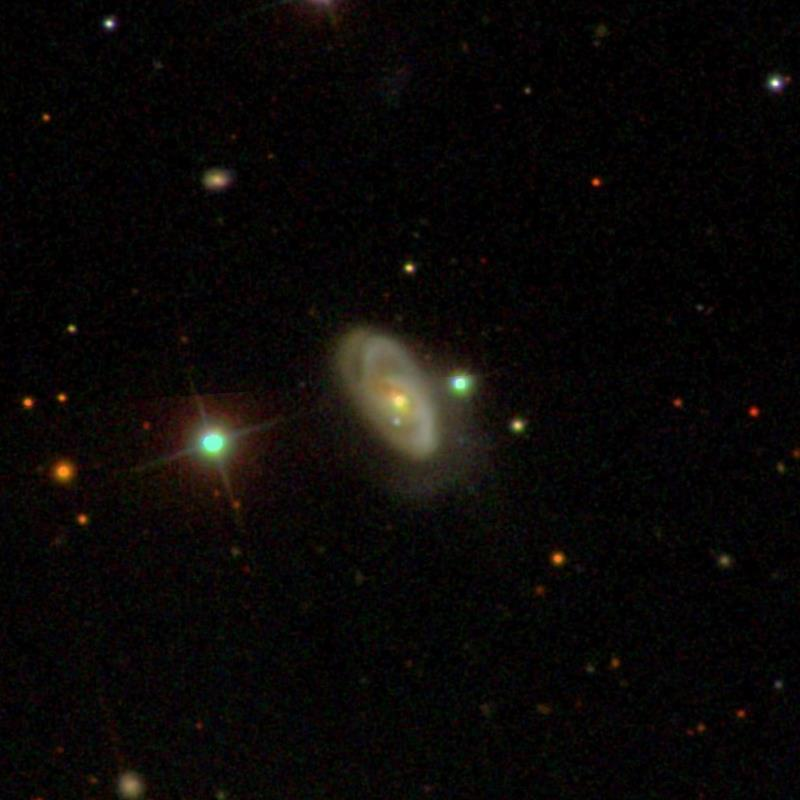
- SDSS image of NGC 354

Observation data (J2000 epoch)
- Constellation: Pisces
- Right ascension: 01^{h} 03^{m} 16.4^{s}
- Declination: +22° 20′ 34″
- Redshift: 0.015561
- Heliocentric radial velocity: 4,665 km/s
- Apparent magnitude (V): 14.39

Characteristics
- Type: SB
- Apparent size (V): 0.8' × 0.4'

Other designations
- UGC 00645, MRK 0353, CGCG 480-037, MCG +04-03-037, 2MASX J01031641+2220338, 2MASXi J0103163+222032, IRAS 01005+2204, F01005+2204, PGC 3763.

NGC 354 is a barred spiral galaxy in the constellation Pisces. It was discovered on October 24, 1881 by Édouard Stephan. It was described by Dreyer as "very faint, very small, round, very small (faint) star involved, 14th magnitude star close to west."
