= NGC 645 =

Galaxy in the constellation Perseus

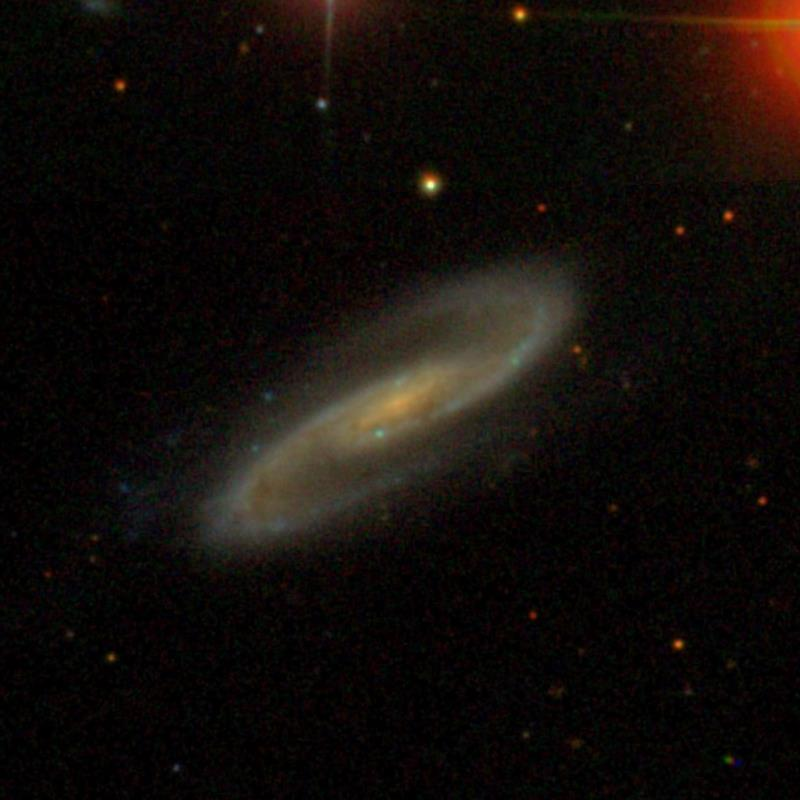
- SDSS image of NGC 645

Observation data (J2000 epoch)
- Constellation: Pisces
- Right ascension: 01^{h} 40^{m} 08.698^{s}
- Declination: +05° 43′ 36.18″
- Redshift: 0.011028
- Heliocentric radial velocity: 3288 km/s
- Distance: 112.1 Mly (34.36 Mpc)
- Apparent magnitude (B): 13.8

Characteristics
- Type: SB:b

Other designations
- UGC 1177, MCG +01-05-016, PGC 6172

NGC 645 is a barred spiral galaxy in the constellation Pisces. It is estimated to be 112 million light-years from the Milky Way and has a diameter of approximately 115,000 light years. The object was discovered on October 27, 1864, by astronomer Albert Marth.

NGC 645 is a member of the NGC 645 Group or LGG 28. It has at least 5 galaxies, NGC 632, NGC 638, UGC 1137 and UGC 1172.

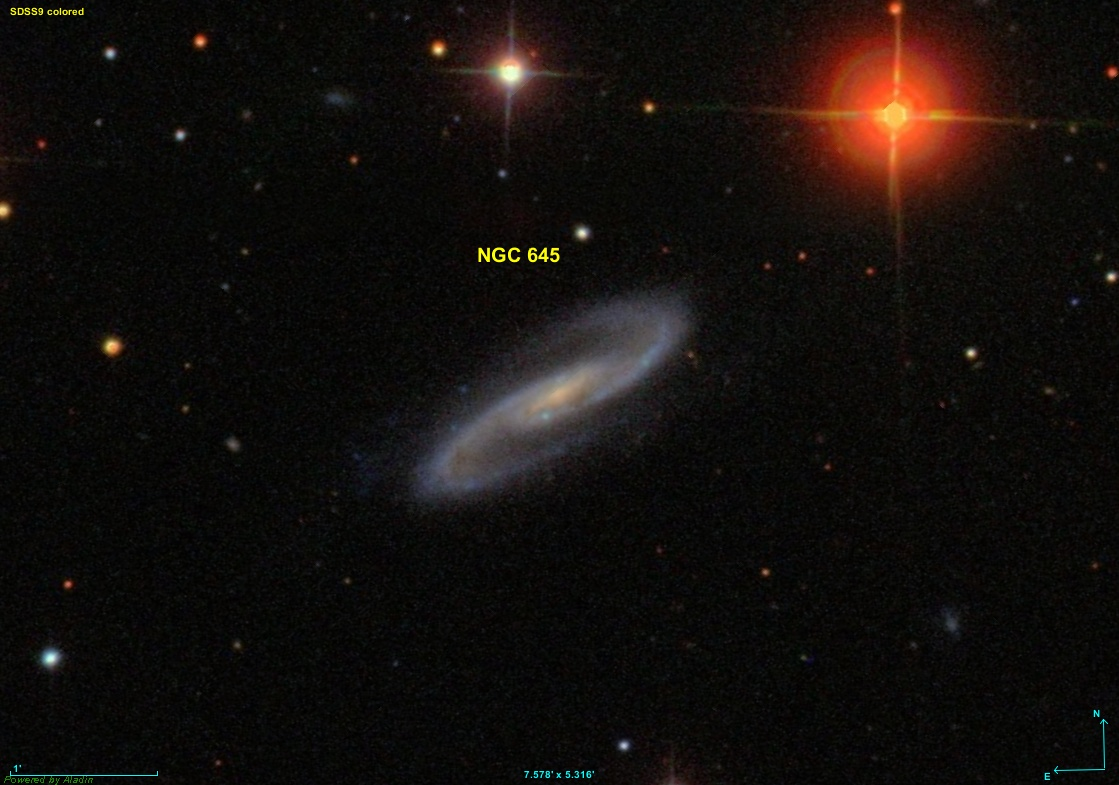
NGC 645 (SDSS)

== See also ==
- List of NGC objects (1–1000)
