= Markarian 590 =

Galaxy in the constellation of Cetus

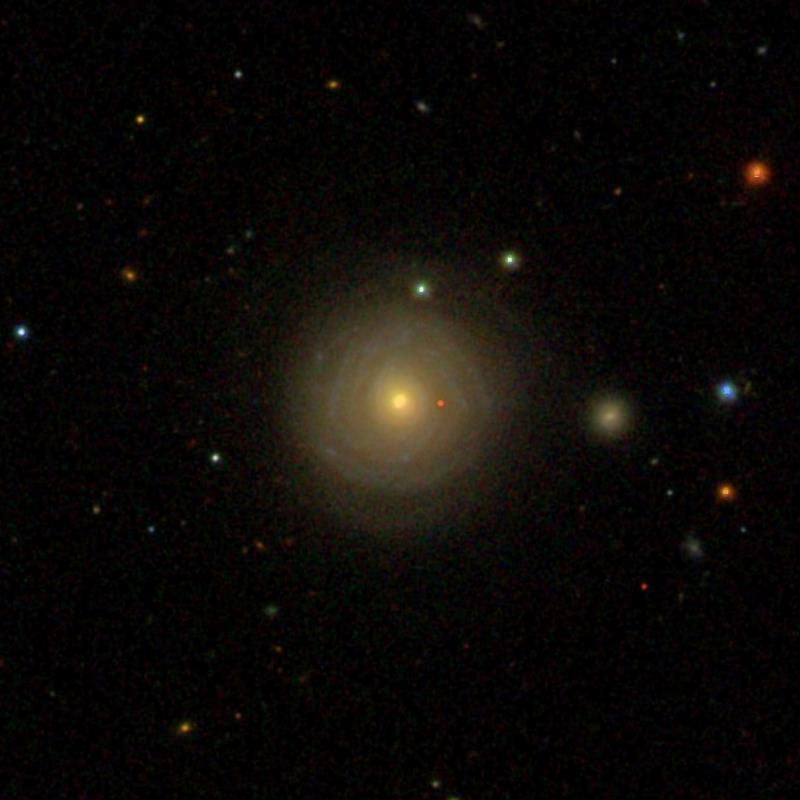
- NGC 863 by SDSS

Observation data (J2000 epoch)
- Constellation: Cetus
- Right ascension: 02^{h} 14^{m} 33.6^{s}
- Declination: −00° 46′ 00″
- Redshift: 0.026385 ± 0.000040
- Heliocentric radial velocity: 7,910 ± 10 km/s
- Distance: 297 ± 19 Mly (91.1 ± 5.7 Mpc)
- Apparent magnitude (V): 13.2

Characteristics
- Type: SA(s)a
- Apparent size (V): 1.1′ × 1.0′
- Notable features: Seyfert galaxy

Other designations
- NGC 863, NGC 866, NGC 885, UGC 1727, MCG +00-06-056, PGC 8586

Markarian 590, also known as NGC 863, NGC 866, and NGC 885, is an unbarred spiral galaxy located in the constellation Cetus. It is located at a distance of about 300 million light years from Earth, which, given its apparent dimensions, means that NGC 863 is about 110,000 light years across. It is a changing look Seyfert galaxy.

== Observational history ==
Markarian 590 was discovered by William Herschel on 6 January 1785. The galaxy was also discovered independently by Lewis Swift on 3 October 1886, while he also catalogued it again as a different galaxy on 31 October 1886, and thus the galaxy is listed three times in the New General Catalogue. John Louis Emil Dreyer described it as very faint, round, brighter middle, stellar.

=== Supernova ===
One supernova has been observed in Markarian 590:

- SN 2018djd is a Type Ia supernova discovered by All Sky Automated Survey for SuperNovae (ASAS-SN) on 12 July 2018. The supernova was detected in images obtained on 10 July 2018, when it had a magnitude of 16.5. It reached a maximum apparent magnitude of 15.4.

== Characteristics ==
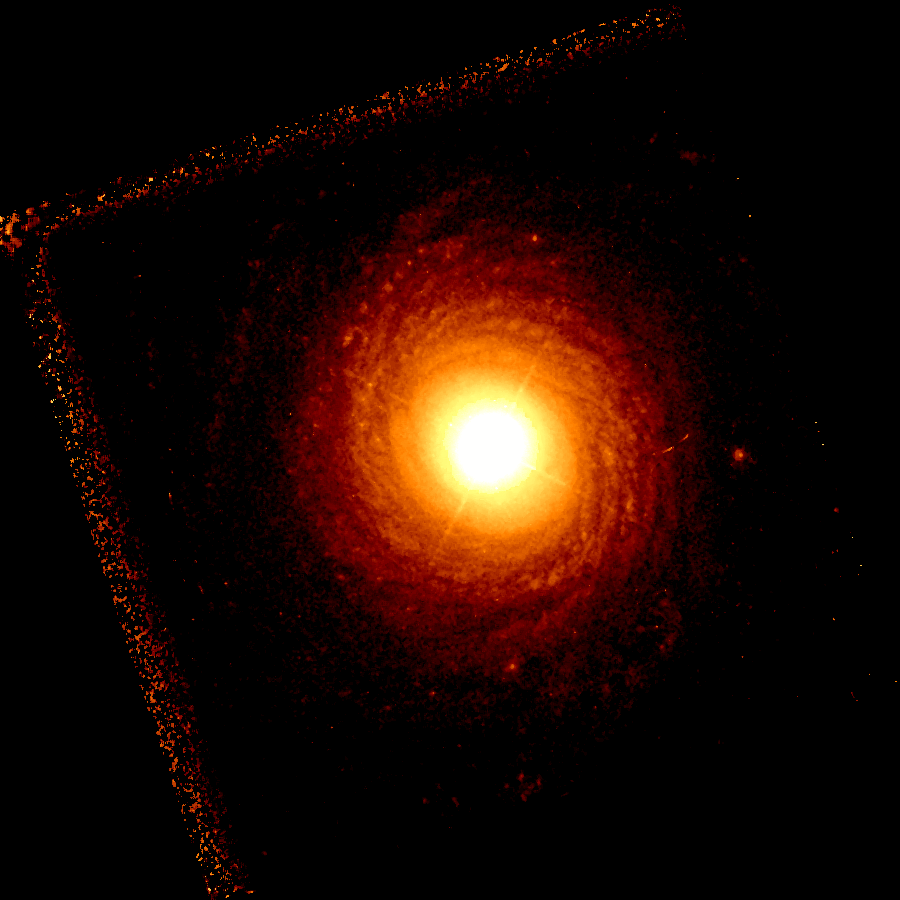
The central region of Markarian 590 by the Hubble Space Telescope

The nucleus of Markarian 590 has been found to be active. The most accepted theory for the energy source of active galactic nuclei is the presence of an accretion disk around a supermassive black hole. The mass of the black hole in the centre of NGC 4593 is estimated to be (47.5±7.4)×10^{6} M_{☉} based on reverberation mapping.

The active galactic nucleus (AGN) of Markarian 590 has been categorised as change looking. This category of Seyfert galaxies is characterised by a change in the spectrum, with the broad emission lines disappearing or appearing, and thus changing the galaxy from to type I to type II and vice versa. Markarian 590 was originally characterised as a type I Seyfert galaxy, but later observations categorised the galaxy as type 1.5 and type 1.9-2.

The broad line emission of Markarian 590 strengthened by a factor of tens from the 1970s to the 1990s and then decreased about 100 times in the 2000s in optical, UV, and X-ray wavelengths, and the broad component of the Hβ emission line disappeared completely. Observations by Suzaku X-ray satellite in 2011 revealed that the soft X-ray excess emission could no longer be detected, while the X-ray continuum flux had minimal change. The X-ray spectrum does not show evidence of obstruction; instead the variation is caused by a change in accretion rate. Observations of the galaxy in the infrared wavelengths revealed a sharp decrease in luminosity between 2000 and 2001. Also, during the low activity period, the radius of the circumnuclear dust torus decreased to 32 light days. In 2014, the soft excess emission had reappeared in observations by Chandra X-ray Observatory, as well as the broad MgII emission line.

The radio emission of the galaxy is concentrated to a single core source, and extends to two components at a radius of about 2 arcsec (~1 kpc) and 6 arcsec (~3 kpc) from the core, that probably are related to the ring-like molecular gas structures observed in CO(3-2) imaging. The outer gas ring is probably related to the spiral arms of the galaxy while the inner ring is related to faint dust lanes. The central molecular gas mass is estimated to be less than 1.6×10^{5} M_{☉}, not significantly less than other AGNs. A faint parsec-scale radio jet extending 2.8 mas to the north has been detected using very-long-baseline interferometry. The radio emission exhibits long term variation that follows that of the other wavelengths.

X-ray observations of the galaxy has shown the presence of ultra fast outflows, in the form of blueshifted absorption lines of O viii, Ne ix, Si xiv, and Mg xii.
