= I Zwicky 36 =

Galaxy in the constellation Canes Venatici

I Zw 36
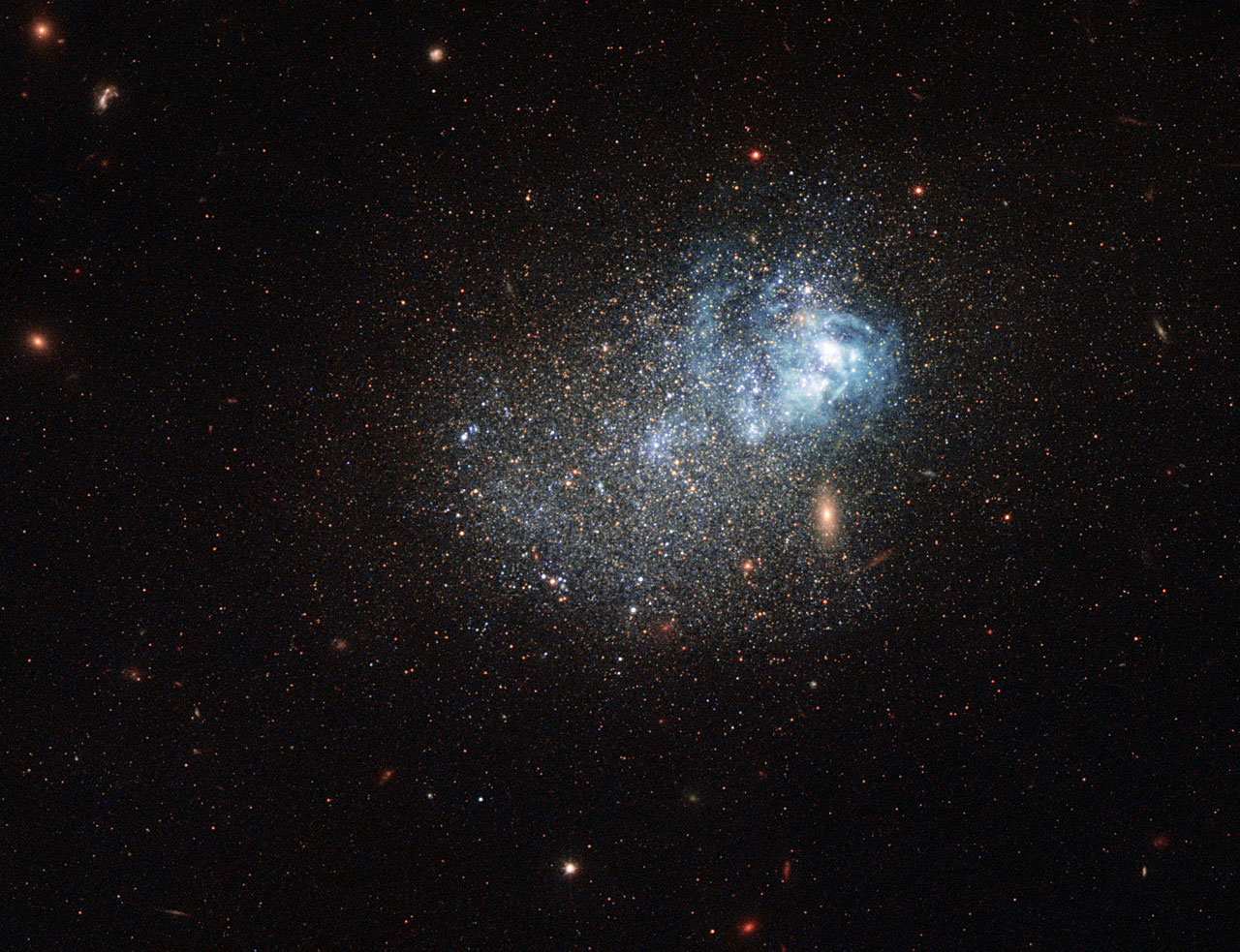
- Blue compact dwarf galaxy known as Markarian 209 taken by the Hubble Space Telescope

Observation data (J2000 epoch)
- Constellation: Canes Venatici
- Right ascension: 12^{h} 26^{m} 16.02^{s}
- Declination: +48° 29′ 36.6″
- Redshift: 0.000941
- Heliocentric radial velocity: 282 km/s
- Distance: 19 Mly (5.8 Mpc)
- Apparent magnitude (B): 15.3
- Absolute magnitude (V): −14.7

Characteristics
- Type: Blue compact dwarf

Other designations
- PG 1223+488, Z 1223.9+4846, Anon 1223+48, PG 1223+487, UZC J122617.1+482938, [H56] 29, ZW I 36, TC 211, SBSG 1223+487, UGCA 281, LEDA 40665, MCG +08-23-035, Mrk 209

I Zwicky 36, often abbreviated to I Zw 36, is a galaxy in the constellation of Canes Venatici. It is located at a distance of about 5.8 megaparsecs from the Milky Way.

I Zwicky 36 is an irregular galaxy, specifically a blue compact dwarf galaxy. These galaxies are small, and have high rates of star formation, making them appear bluish in color. The dominant population of stars in I Zw 36 is young in stellar terms, with ages of under 3 million years. It is quite isolated: the nearest galaxy is Messier 94 (NGC 4736) which is about 1.4 megaparsecs away, although the galaxy may have experienced a merger in the past that could explain its current burst of star formation.
