= NGC 830 =

Galaxy in the constellation Cetus

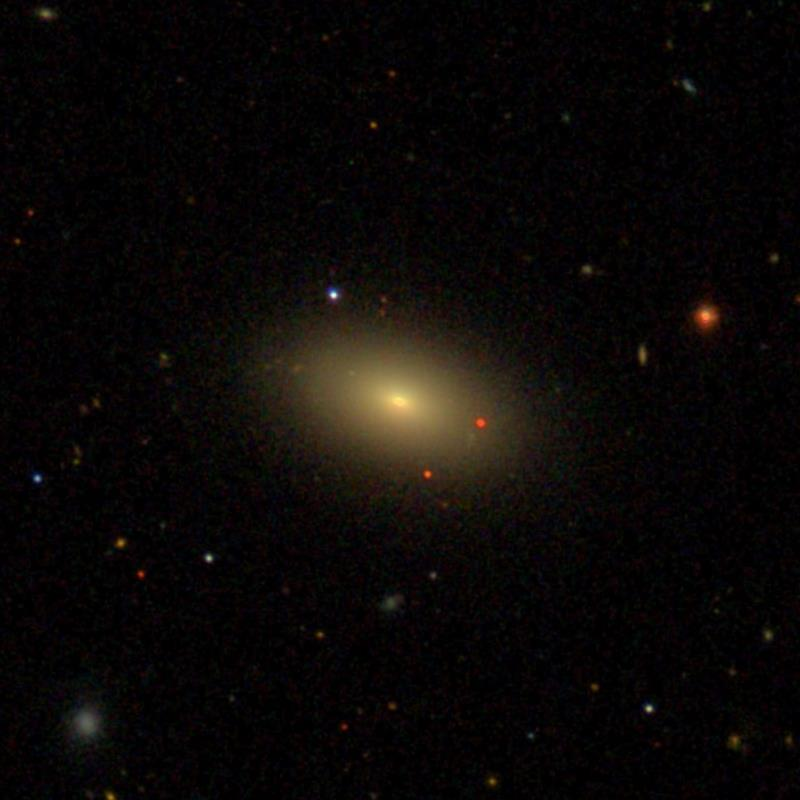
- SDSS image of NGC 830

Observation data (J2000 epoch)
- Constellation: Cetus
- Right ascension: 02^{h} 08^{m} 58.67851^{s}
- Declination: −07° 46′ 00.4978″
- Redshift: 0.01349
- Heliocentric radial velocity: 4017 km/s
- Distance: 167.8 Mly (51.44 Mpc)
- Apparent magnitude (B): 15.0

Characteristics
- Type: SB0^{−}?

Other designations
- MCG -01-06-050, Mrk 1020, PGC 8201

NGC 830 is a barred lenticular galaxy in the constellation Cetus. It is estimated to be about 170 million light-years from the Milky Way and has a diameter of approximately 70,000 light years. It was discovered by Heinrich Louis d'Arrest on 23 September 1865.

== See also ==
- List of NGC objects (1–1000)
