= NGC 7674 =

Galaxy located in the constellation Pegasus

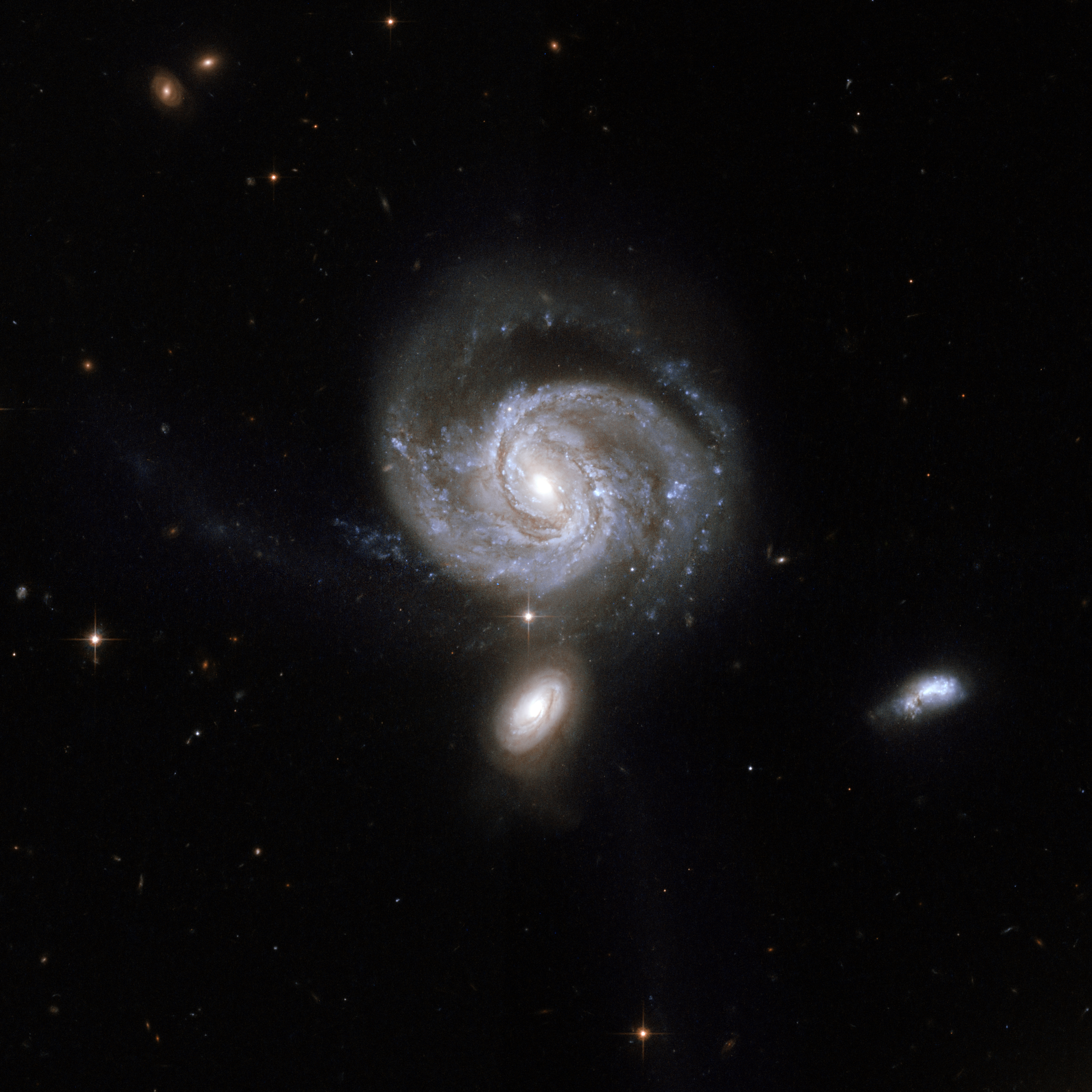
- NGC 7674 imaged by the Hubble Space Telescope

Observation data (J2000 epoch)
- Constellation: Pegasus
- Right ascension: 23^{h} 27^{m} 56.7^{s}
- Declination: +08° 46′ 45″
- Redshift: 0.028924 ± 0.000030
- Heliocentric radial velocity: 8,671 ± 9 km/s
- Distance: 380 Mly (117 Mpc)
- Apparent magnitude (V): 13.1

Characteristics
- Type: SA(r)bc pec
- Apparent size (V): 1.1′ × 1.0′
- Notable features: Seyfert galaxy

Other designations
- Arp 182, UGC 12608, MCG +01-59-080, Mrk 533, PGC 71504, CGCG 406-112, VV 343a

NGC 7674 is a spiral galaxy located in the constellation Pegasus. It is located at a distance of about 350 million light years from Earth, which, given its apparent dimensions, means that NGC 7674 is about 125,000 light years across. It was discovered by British astronomer John Herschel on 16 August 1830.

== Characteristics ==
The galaxy is seen nearly face-on, at an inclination of 31 degrees. The central bar-shaped structure, measuring 15×5 arcseconds is made up of stars. The galaxy has two spiral arms that become broader as the distance increases. One arm vanishes at the point it overlaps with the nearby galaxy NGC 7674A. The shape of NGC 7674, including the long narrow streamers emanating northeast and northwest of the galaxy can be accounted for by tidal interactions with its companions. There is no dwarf galaxy seen inside the streamers. It is featured in Arp's Atlas of Peculiar Galaxies as number 182, in the category "galaxies with narrow filaments".

NGC 7674 has a powerful active nucleus of the kind known as a type 2 Seyfert that is perhaps fed by gas drawn into the center through the interactions with the companions. In 1975, observations of excess ultraviolet emission led to designation as Markarian 533 in Markarian's catalog. Later, using spectropolarimetry, emission characteristic of a hidden broad-line region (BLR), visible only in the polarized flux spectrum was detected, implying that the nucleus of NGC 7674 is an obscured type 1 Seyfert, hidden by a dust torus. In the center of NGC 7674 lies a supermassive black hole whose mass is estimated to be nearly 3.63×10^{7} M_{☉} based on stellar velocity dispersion. When observed in radio waves, NGC 7674 features two radio jets with an S-shape, 0.7 kpc long. The reason for this shape may be a change in the black hole spin axis due to a minor merger, the presence of a binary black hole or due to interactions with the interstellar medium. Two radio sources with characteristics similar to accreting supermassive black holes have been observed in the centre of NGC 7674, at a projected separation of 0.35 parsec.

NGC 7674 falls into the family of luminous infrared galaxies, with its infrared luminosity being 10^{11.54} L_{☉}. The luminous infrared galaxies are characterised by intense star forming activity. The total star formation rate in NGC 7674 is estimated to be 54 M_{☉} per year, and the star formation rate at the nucleus is 4.3 M_{☉} per year.

== Supernovae ==
Two supernovae have been observed in NGC 7674:

- SN 2011ee (Type Ic, mag 18.6) was discovered by the European Southern Observatory's Infrared Supernova Search on 27 June 2011.
- SN 2011hb (Type Ia, mag 18.8) was discovered by the Catalina Real-time Transient Survey and Stan Howerton on 24 October 2011.

== Nearby galaxies ==
NGC 7674 is the brightest and largest member of the isolated Hickson 96 compact group of galaxies, consisting of four galaxies. NGC 7674 forms a pair with its smaller companion NGC 7674A, which lies 34 arcseconds to the north. NGC 7675, an elliptical galaxy, lies 2.2 arcminutes to the east.
