= NGC 5256 =

Pair of colliding galaxies in the constellation Ursa Major

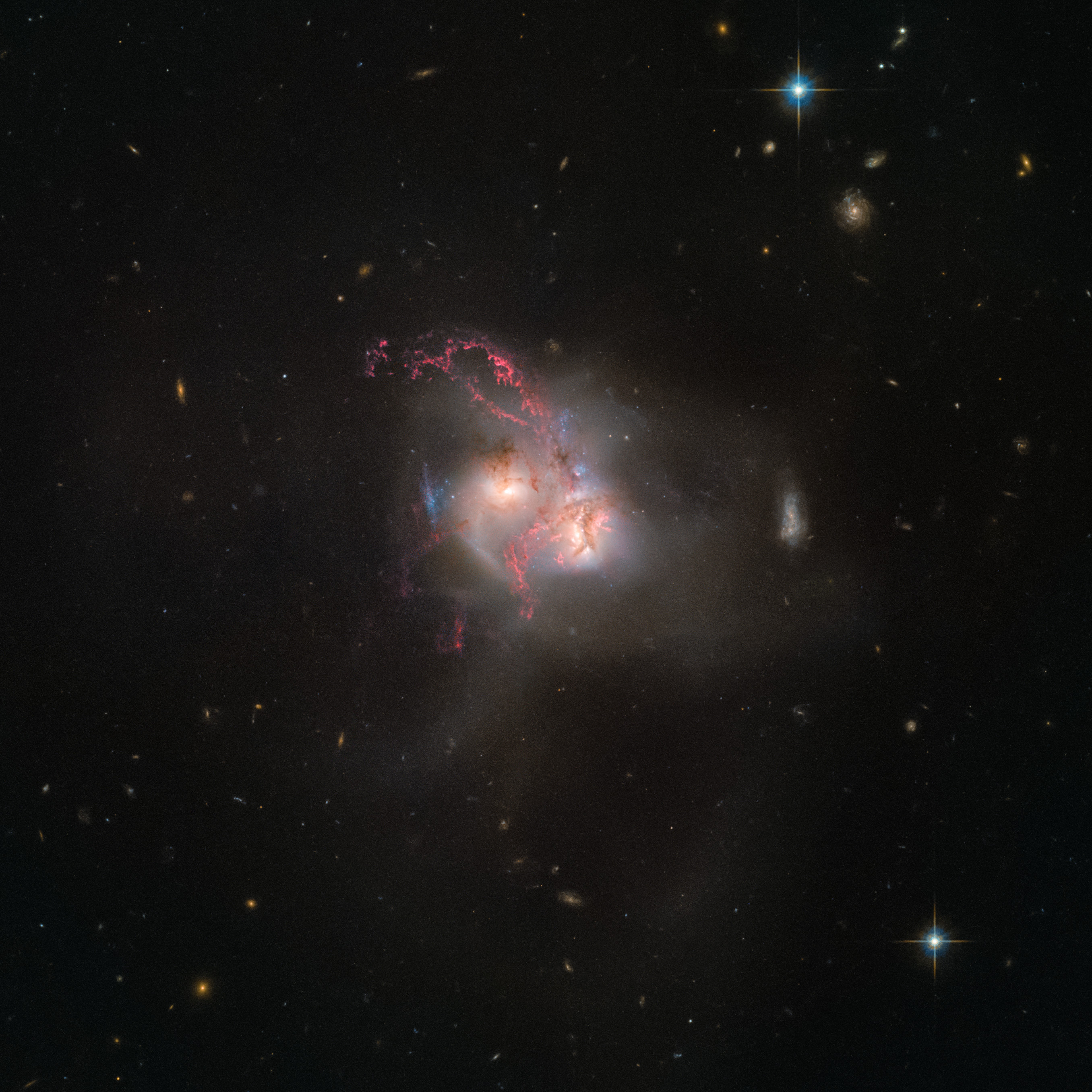
- NGC 5256 as seen through the Hubble Space Telescope

Observation data (J2000 epoch)
- Constellation: Ursa Major
- Right ascension: 13^{h} 38^{m} 17.5^{s}
- Declination: +48° 16′ 37″
- Redshift: 0.027863±0.000043
- Heliocentric radial velocity: 8353±13 km/s
- Galactocentric velocity: 8447±13 km/s
- Distance: 420 Mly (129 Mpc)

Characteristics
- Type: SAB(nc)P
- Apparent size (V): 1.20′ × 1.1′

Other designations
- UGC 8632, MCG 8-25-31, MK 266, PGC 48192, KCPG 388A, IRAS13362+4831, ZWG 246.21 and 1ZW 67

NGC 5256 is an object that contains two disc galaxies, that are colliding into each other. It is located in the constellation Ursa Major, and was discovered by William Herschel on 12 May 1787. The two nuclei of the galaxies are separated by about 13,000 light-years. The southwest and northeast nuclei have masses of 7×10^{9} M_{☉} and 10×10^{9} M_{☉}, assuming they orbit around a common center of mass. NGC 5256 is located at about 420 million light-years away from the Earth.

NGC 5256 is also known as Markarian 266 and is one of the Markarian galaxies, included in the Markarian Survey due to its high amount of ultraviolet emission. However, it is also a luminous infrared galaxy (LIRG); most of its energy is emitted in the infrared range.

== See also ==
- List of NGC objects (5001–6000)
- List of NGC objects
