= NGC 4363 =

Galaxy in the constellation Draco

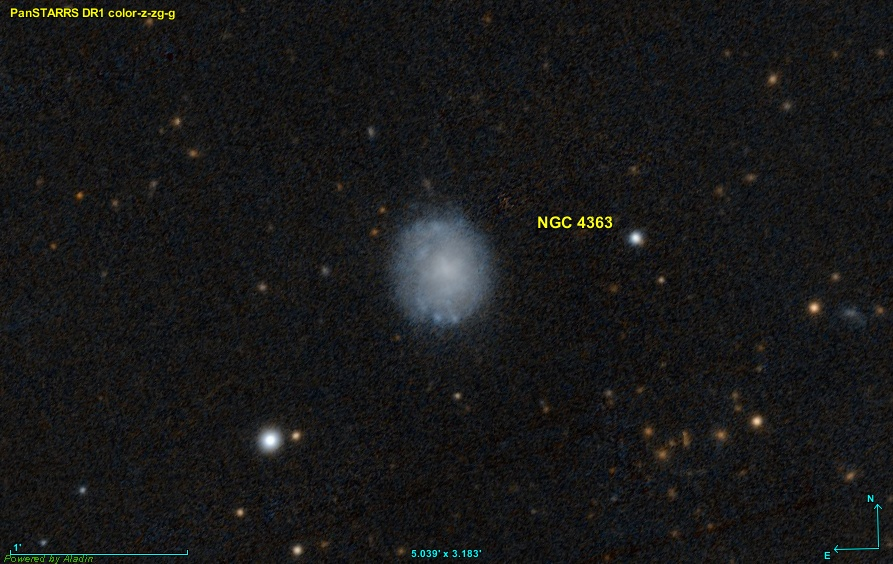
- NGC 4363 imaged by Pan-STARRS

Observation data (J2000 epoch)
- Constellation: Draco
- Right ascension: 12^{h} 23^{m} 28.6726^{s}
- Declination: +74° 57′ 08.515″
- Redshift: 0.004760
- Heliocentric radial velocity: 1427 ± 0 km/s
- Distance: 70.9 ± 5.0 Mly (21.75 ± 1.52 Mpc)
- Apparent magnitude (V): 13.5

Characteristics
- Type: SAb?
- Size: ~38,300 ly (11.73 kpc) (estimated)
- Apparent size (V): 1.4′ × 1.4′

Other designations
- IRAS F12212+7513, PGC 40233, CGCG 352-032

NGC 4363 is a spiral galaxy in the constellation of Draco. Its velocity with respect to the cosmic microwave background is 1474 ± 3 km/s, which corresponds to a Hubble distance of 21.75 ± 1.52 Mpc (~71 million light-years). The galaxy was discovered by German-British astronomer William Herschel on 10 December 1797.

On 31 October 2023, Kōichi Itagaki discovered a supernova in NGC 4363: SN 2023wcr (Type II, mag. 16).

== NGC 4589 Group ==
NGC 4363 is a bright galaxy in the X-ray range and is part of the NGC 4589 group which includes at least 17 other galaxies also bright in the X-ray range: NGC 4127, NGC 4133, NGC 4159, NGC 4291, NGC 4319, NGC 4331, NGC 4386, NGC 4589, NGC 4648, UGC 7086, UGC 7189, UGC 7238, UGC 7265, UGC 7844, UGC 7872 and UGC 7908.

== See also ==
- List of NGC objects (4001–5000)
