= NGC 797 =

Galaxy in the constellation Andromeda

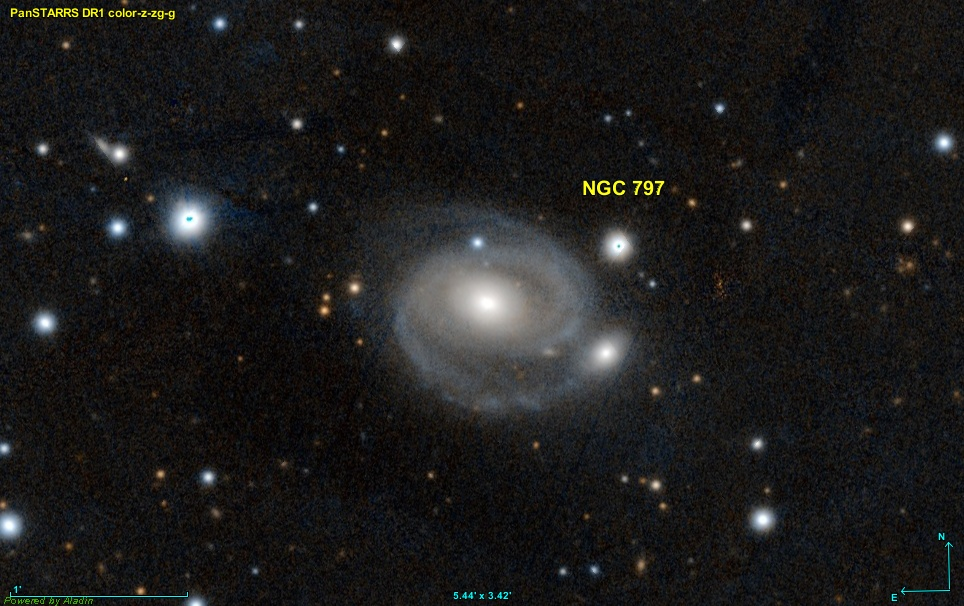
- NGC 797 imaged by Pan-STARRS

Observation data (J2000 epoch)
- Constellation: Andromeda
- Right ascension: 02^{h} 03^{m} 27.9624^{s}
- Declination: +38° 07′ 00.823″
- Redshift: 0.018860±0.0000130
- Heliocentric radial velocity: 5,654±4 km/s
- Distance: 369.64 ± 4.35 Mly (113.333 ± 1.333 Mpc)
- Group or cluster: CGPG 0200.4+3753
- Apparent magnitude (V): 13.1

Characteristics
- Type: SAB(s)a
- Size: ~210,400 ly (64.51 kpc) (estimated)
- Apparent size (V): 1.9′ × 1.4′

Other designations
- CGPG 0200.4+3753 NED02, NGC 797 NED02, UGC 1541, MCG +06-05-078 NED02, PGC 7832, CGCG 522-105 NED02, VV 428 NED02

NGC 797 (also known as NGC 797 NED02) is a barred spiral galaxy in the constellation of Andromeda. Its velocity with respect to the cosmic microwave background is 5,414±17 km/s, which corresponds to a Hubble distance of 260.4 ± 18.3 Mly (79.85 ± 5.60 Mpc). However, three non-redshift measurements give a much farther mean distance of 369.64 ± 4.35 Mly (113.333 ± 1.333 Mpc). It was discovered by German-British astronomer William Herschel on 21 September 1786.

In 1971, Fritz Zwicky and his daughter, Margrit A. Zwicky, published Catalogue of Selected Compact Galaxies and of Post-Eruptive Galaxies, which showed that NGC 797 has an elliptical compact companion galaxy at the tip of its southwest spiral arm, and catalogued the galaxy pair as CGPG 0200.4+3753. The companion galaxy is catalogued as NGC 0797 NED01 and PGC 212899, among other designations.

NGC 797 and NGC 801 form a galaxy pair, and the distance between the two is about 150 kiloparsecs.

== Supernova ==
One supernova has been observed in NGC 797:

- SN 2025pel (Type Ia, mag. 18.41) was discovered by GOTO on 17 June 2025.

== See also ==
- List of NGC objects (1–1000)
