= NGC 3689 =

Galaxy in the constellation Leo

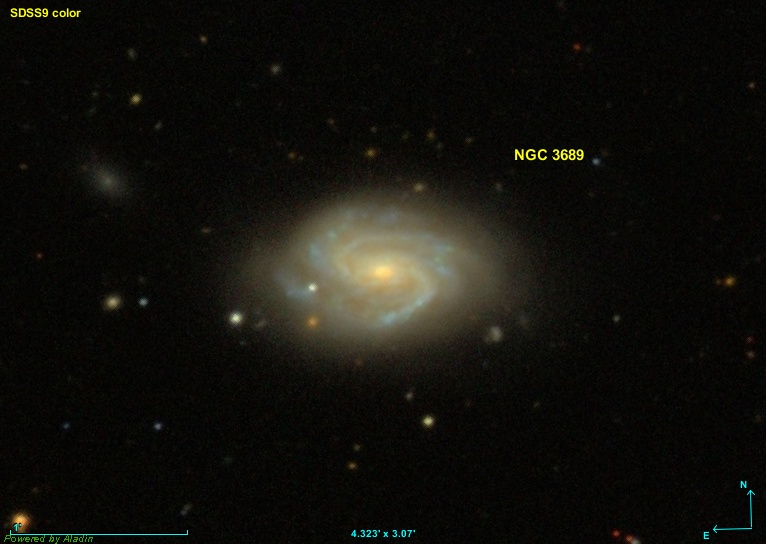
- NGC 3689 imaged by SDSS

Observation data (J2000 epoch)
- Constellation: Leo
- Right ascension: 11^{h} 28^{m} 11.0446^{s}
- Declination: +25° 39′ 39.943″
- Redshift: 0.009130
- Heliocentric radial velocity: 2737 ± 1 km/s
- Distance: 146.7 ± 10.3 Mly (44.97 ± 3.16 Mpc)
- Apparent magnitude (V): 12.3

Characteristics
- Type: SAB(rs)c
- Size: ~69,100 ly (21.20 kpc) (estimated)
- Apparent size (V): 1.7′ × 1.1′

Other designations
- 2MASX J11281100+2539397, UGC 6467, MCG +04-27-037, PGC 35294, CGCG 126-057

NGC 3689 is an intermediate spiral galaxy in the constellation of Leo. Its velocity with respect to the cosmic microwave background is 3049 ± 22 km/s, which corresponds to a Hubble distance of 44.97 ± 3.16 Mpc (~147 million light-years). However, 16 non-redshift measurements give a closer distance of 39.350 ± 2.088 Mpc (~128 million light-years). The galaxy was discovered by German-British astronomer William Herschel on 6 April 1785.

NGC 3689 is a radio galaxy, i.e. it has giant regions of radio emission extending well beyond its visible structure.

The SAGA Astronomical Survey for the search for satellite galaxies orbiting another galaxy confirmed the presence of two satellite galaxies for NGC 3689.

== Supernovae ==
Two supernovae have been observed in NGC 3689:

- AT 2024mxe (type Gap, mag. 17.7) was a calcium-rich supernova discovered by GOTO on 26 June 2024.
- SN 2026gwx (Type Ib, mag. 20.8896) was discovered by the Zwicky Transient Facility on 20 March 2026. It had been initially classified as Type Ia, but later analysis concluded it was Type Ib.

== See also ==
- List of NGC objects (3001–4000)
