= NGC 1363 =

Galaxy in the constellation Eridanus

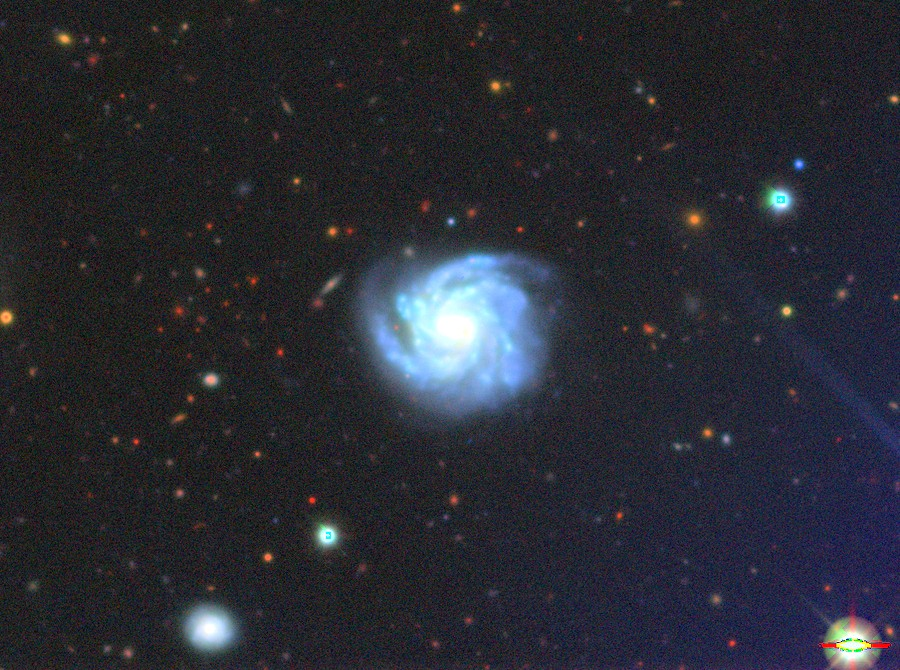
- NGC 1363 imaged by Legacy Surveys

Observation data (J2000 epoch)
- Constellation: Eridanus
- Right ascension: 03^{h} 34^{m} 49.5486^{s}
- Declination: −09° 50′ 32.476″
- Redshift: 0.031882±0.000120
- Heliocentric radial velocity: 9,558±36 km/s
- Distance: 453.0 ± 31.8 Mly (138.88 ± 9.75 Mpc)
- Apparent magnitude (V): 13.9b

Characteristics
- Type: SB?(r:)bc pec
- Size: ~134,700 ly (41.29 kpc) (estimated)
- Apparent size (V): 0.79′ × 0.62′

Other designations
- IRAS 03324-1000, 2MASX J03344957-0950332, PGC 13245

NGC 1363 is a peculiar barred spiral galaxy in the constellation of Eridanus. Its velocity with respect to the cosmic microwave background is 9,416±37 km/s, which corresponds to a Hubble distance of 453.0 ± 31.8 Mly (138.88 ± 9.75 Mpc). It was discovered by American astronomer Sherburne Wesley Burnham on 31 December 1877.

NGC 1363 is a Seyfert I galaxy, i.e. it has a quasar-like nucleus with very high surface brightnesses whose spectra reveal strong, high-ionisation emission lines, but unlike quasars, the host galaxy is clearly detectable.

== Supernovae ==
Two supernovae have been observed in NGC 1363:

- SN 2022ackv (Type Ia, mag. 17.476) was discovered by ATLAS on 7 December 2022.
- SN 2025xaz (Type Ia, mag. 18.63) was discovered by GOTO on 7 September 2025.

== See also ==
- List of NGC objects (1001–2000)
