= NGC 7835 =

Spiral galaxy in the constellation Pisces

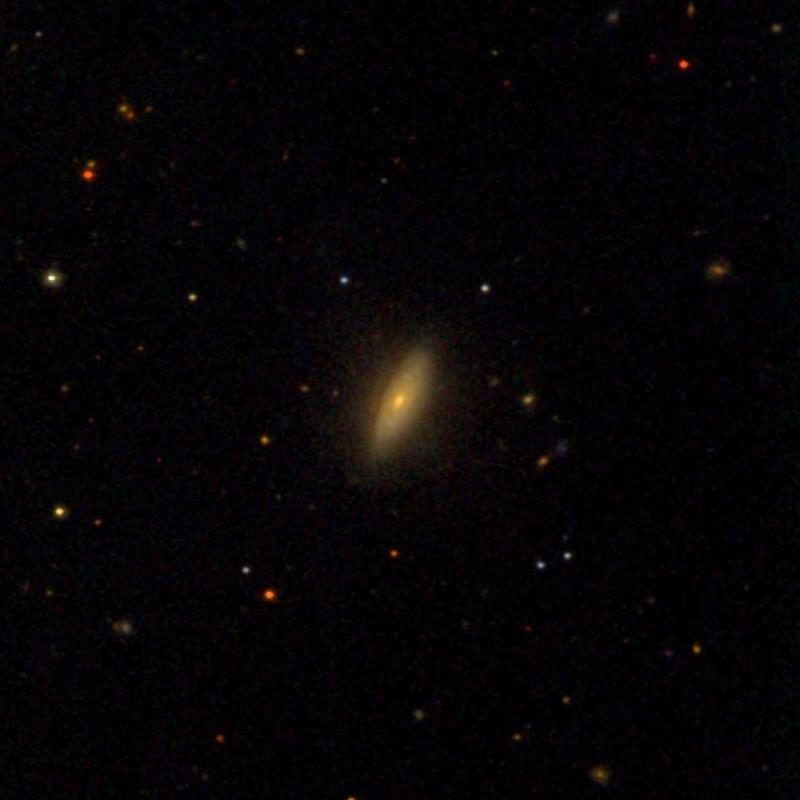
- SDSS image of NGC 7835.

Observation data (J2000 epoch)
- Constellation: Pisces
- Right ascension: 00^{h} 06^{m} 46.8^{s}
- Declination: 08° 25′ 33″
- Redshift: 0.039507
- Heliocentric radial velocity: 11844 km/s
- Distance: 510 Mly (156 Mpc)
- Apparent magnitude (V): 15.43

Characteristics
- Type: Sb
- Size: ~160,000 ly (48 kpc) (estimated)
- Apparent size (V): 0.4 x 0.15

Other designations
- MCG +01-01-031, PGC 000505

NGC 7835 is a spiral galaxy located about 215 million light-years away in the constellation of Pisces. It was discovered by astronomer Albert Marth on November 29, 1864.

== Supernova ==
One supernova has been observed in NGC 7835:

- SN 2026abex (Type Ia, mag. 19.13) was discovered by GOTO on 8 September 2009.

== See also ==
- List of NGC objects (7001–7840)
