= NGC 6070 =

Galaxy in the constellation Serpens

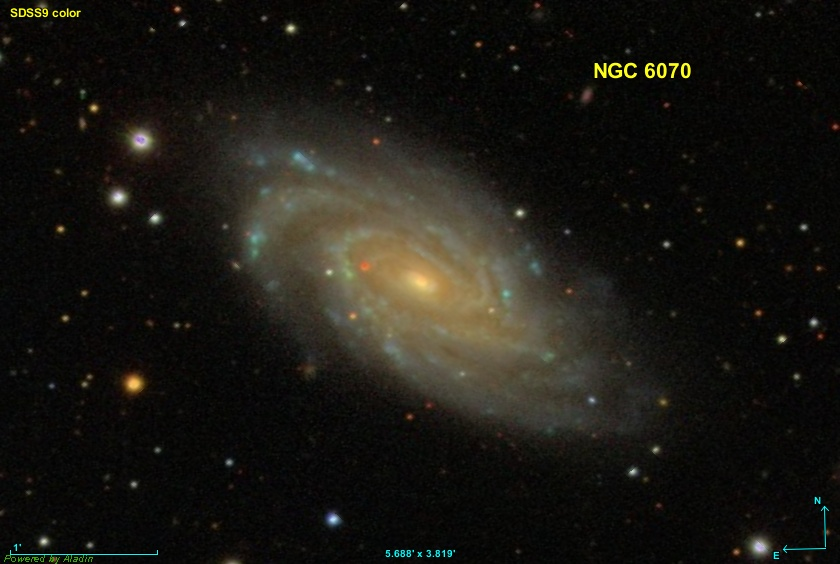
- NGC 6070 imaged by SDSS

Observation data (J2000 epoch)
- Constellation: Serpens
- Right ascension: 16^{h} 09^{m} 58.6618^{s}
- Declination: +00° 42′ 33.455″
- Redshift: 0.006685±0.00000200
- Heliocentric radial velocity: 2,004±1 km/s
- Distance: 93.43 ± 3.04 Mly (28.646 ± 0.931 Mpc)
- Group or cluster: NGC 6070 group (LGG 404)
- Apparent magnitude (V): 12.45

Characteristics
- Type: SA(s)cd
- Size: ~106,000 ly (32.50 kpc) (estimated)
- Apparent size (V): 3.5′ × 1.9′

Other designations
- HOLM 729A, IRAS 16074+0050, 2MASX J16095868+0042335, UGC 10230, MCG +00-41-004, PGC 57345, CGCG 023-017

NGC 6070 is a spiral galaxy in the constellation of Serpens. Its velocity with respect to the cosmic microwave background is 2,102±7 km/s, which corresponds to a Hubble distance of 101.1 ± 7.1 Mly (31.00 ± 2.17 Mpc). However, 26 non-redshift measurements give a closer mean distance of 93.43 ± 3.04 Mly (28.646 ± 0.931 Mpc). It was discovered by German-British astronomer William Herschel on 3 May 1786.

NGC 6070 has a possible active galactic nucleus, i.e. it has a compact region at the center of a galaxy that emits a significant amount of energy across the electromagnetic spectrum, with characteristics indicating that this luminosity is not produced by the stars.

== NGC 6070 group ==
NGC 6070 is a member of the NGC 6070 group (also known as LGG 404). The other two galaxies in the group are UGC 10290 and UGC 10288.

== Supernova ==
One supernova has been observed in NGC 6070:

- SN 2026ejy (Type II, mag. 18.55) was discovered by GOTO on 25 February 2026.

== See also ==
- List of NGC objects (6001–7000)
