= NGC 7647 =

Galaxy in the constellation Pegasus

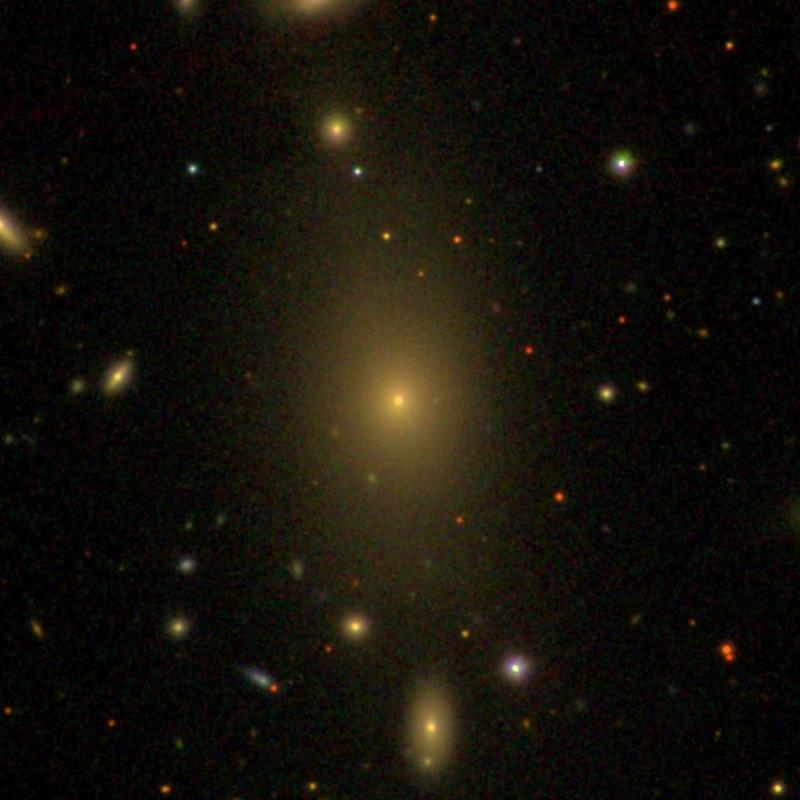

Observation data (J2000 epoch)
- Constellation: Pegasus
- Right ascension: 23^{h} 23^{m} 57.4331^{s}
- Declination: +16° 46′ 38.122″
- Redshift: 0.041091
- Heliocentric radial velocity: 12,319 km/s
- Distance: 575 Mly

Characteristics
- Type: cD;E;BrCIG
- Size: ~315,400 ly (96.70 kpc) (estimated)

Other designations
- Abell 2589 [ZAC2011] BCG, GIN 681, PGC 71325, CGCG 0454-063, MCG +03-59-055, PGC 71335

NGC 7647 is a giant elliptical galaxy of type cD located in the constellation Pegasus. The redshift of the galaxy is (z) 0.041 and it was discovered by German-British astronomer William Herschel on 29 November 1785.

== Supernovae ==
Two supernovae have been observed in NGC 7647:

- SN 2009hi (Type Ia, mag. 18.0) was discovered by Kōichi Itagaki, and independently by the Lick Observatory Supernova Search (LOSS), on 10 July 2009.
- SN 2026abud (Type Ia, mag. 20.1) was discovered by GOTO on 14 September 2026.
