= NGC 5939 =

Galaxy in the constellation Ursa Minor

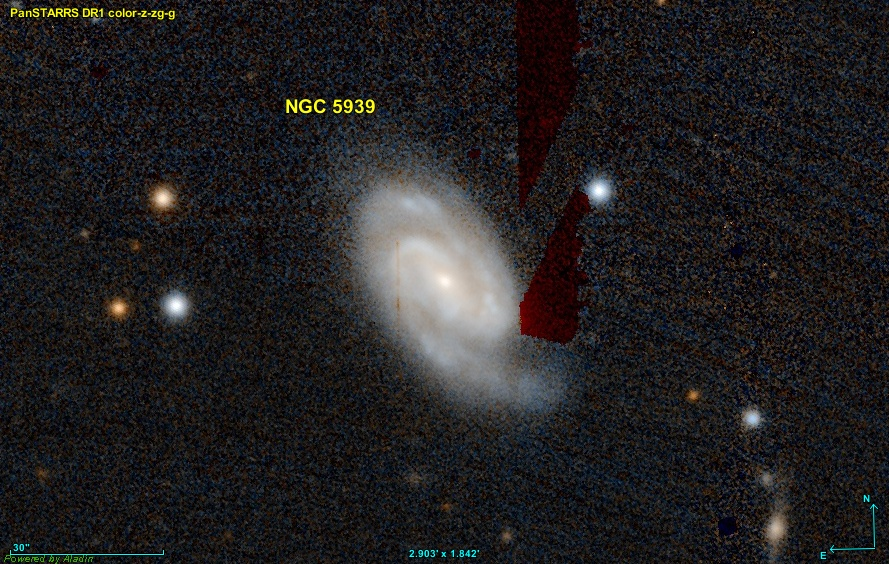
- NGC 5939 imaged by Pan-STARRS

Observation data (J2000 epoch)
- Constellation: Ursa Minor
- Right ascension: 15^{h} 24^{m} 45.9753^{s}
- Declination: +68° 43′ 50.69″
- Redshift: 0.022235
- Heliocentric radial velocity: 6666 ± 4 km/s
- Distance: 321.6 ± 22.5 Mly (98.59 ± 6.90 Mpc)
- Group or cluster: NGC 5939 Group
- Apparent magnitude (V): 13.1

Characteristics
- Type: S?
- Size: ~102,500 ly (31.44 kpc) (estimated)
- Apparent size (V): 0.9′ × 0.5′

Other designations
- IRAS 15244+6854, 2MASX J15244604+6843501, UGC 9854, MCG +12-15-007, PGC 55022, CGCG 338-008

NGC 5939 is a spiral galaxy in the constellation of Ursa Minor. Its velocity with respect to the cosmic microwave background is 6684 ± 4 km/s, which corresponds to a Hubble distance of 98.59 ± 6.90 Mpc (~322 million light-years). It was discovered by American astronomer Lewis Swift on 11 July 1883.

== NGC 5939 Group ==
NGC 5939 is part of a trio of galaxies: The other two galaxies in the group are IC 1129 and UGC 9896.

== Supernovae ==
Three supernovae have been observed in NGC 5939:

- SN 2004ax (Type Ib/c, mag. 17.7) was discovered by the Lick Observatory Supernova Search (LOSS) on 21 March 2004. The spectrum indicated this might be a calcium-rich supernova.
- SN 2019gss (Type II-P, mag. 19.28) was discovered by the Zwicky Transient Facility on 30 may 2019.
- SN 2023gps (Type Ia, mag. 20) was discovered by the Automatic Learning for the Rapid Classification of Events (ALeRCE) on 23 April 2023.

== See also ==
- List of NGC objects (5001–6000)
