= NGC 7645 =

Galaxy in the constellation Sculptor

- NGC 7645 imaged by Legacy Surveys

Observation data (J2000 epoch)
- Constellation: Sculptor
- Right ascension: 23^{h} 23^{m} 47.3070^{s}
- Declination: −29° 23′ 17.083″
- Redshift: 0.023086±0.00000900
- Heliocentric radial velocity: 6,921±3 km/s
- Distance: 318.6 ± 22.3 Mly (97.68 ± 6.84 Mpc)
- Apparent magnitude (V): 13.77

Characteristics
- Type: SB(r)c
- Size: ~205,600 ly (63.04 kpc) (estimated)
- Apparent size (V): 1.4′ × 1.2′

Other designations
- ESO 470- G 003, 2MASX J23234727-2923170, MCG -05-55-007, PGC 71314

NGC 7645 is a barred spiral galaxy in the constellation of Sculptor. Its velocity with respect to the cosmic microwave background is 6,623±21 km/s, which corresponds to a Hubble distance of 318.6 ± 22.3 Mly (97.68 ± 6.84 Mpc). It was discovered by British astronomer John Herschel on 27 September 1834.

== Pair of galaxies ==
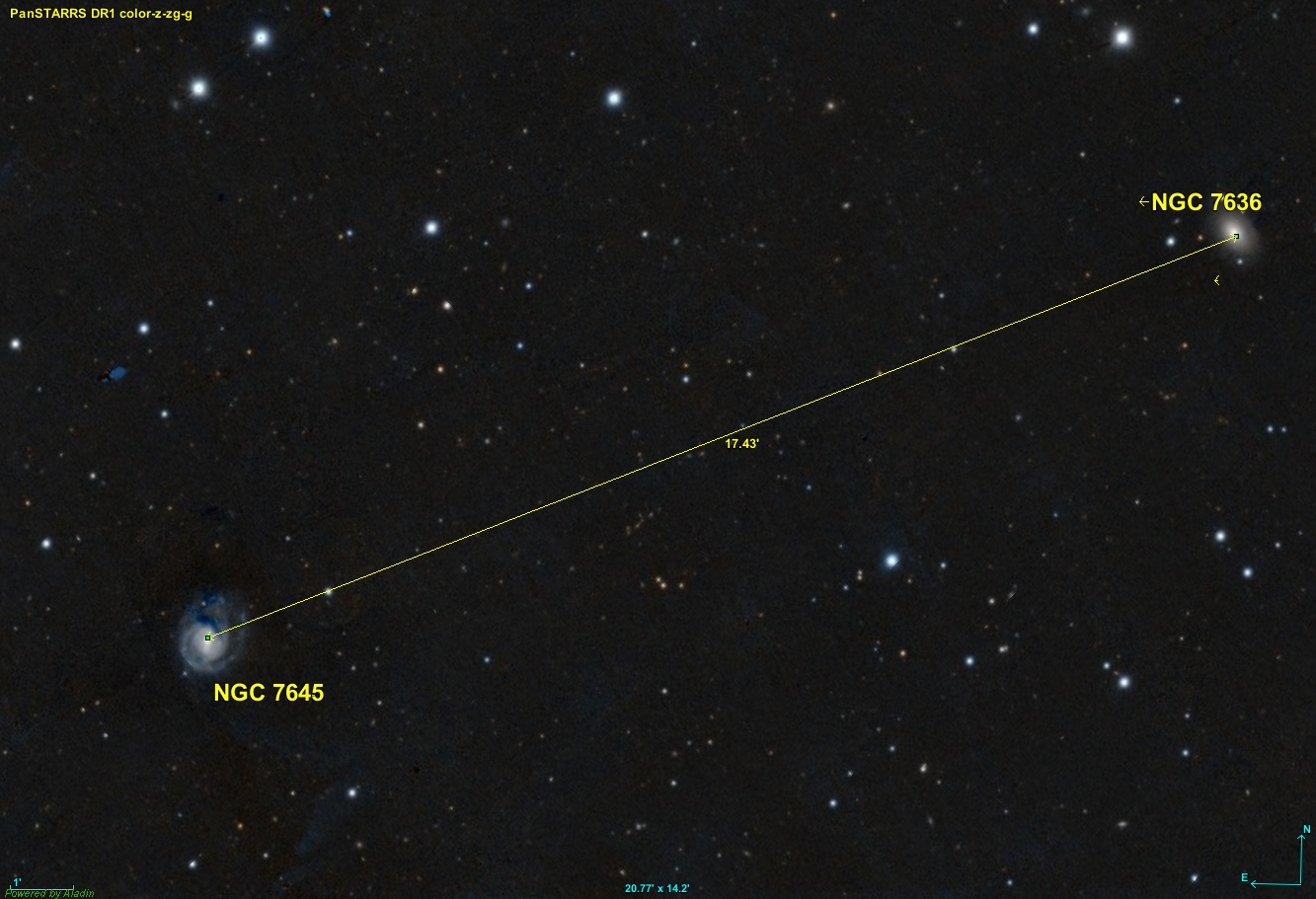
The galaxy pair NGC 7636 and NGC 7645

According to Soares and colleagues, NGC 7645 and NGC 7636 form a galaxy pair with a probability of 0.57. The Hubble distance to NGC 7636 is 323.1 ± 22.7 Mly (99.06 ± 6.96 Mpc), which is close to that of NGC 7645. The galaxies are separated by an angular distance of 17.4′.

== Supernovae ==
Two supernovae have been observed in NGC 7645:

- SN 2010kx (Type II-P, mag. 17.5) was discovered by Kōichi Itagaki on 19 December 2010.
- SN 2026aabq (Type IIb, mag. 19.7) was discovered by GOTO on 23 August 2026.

== See also ==
- List of NGC objects (7001–7840)
