= NGC 5875 =

Galaxy in the constellation Boötes

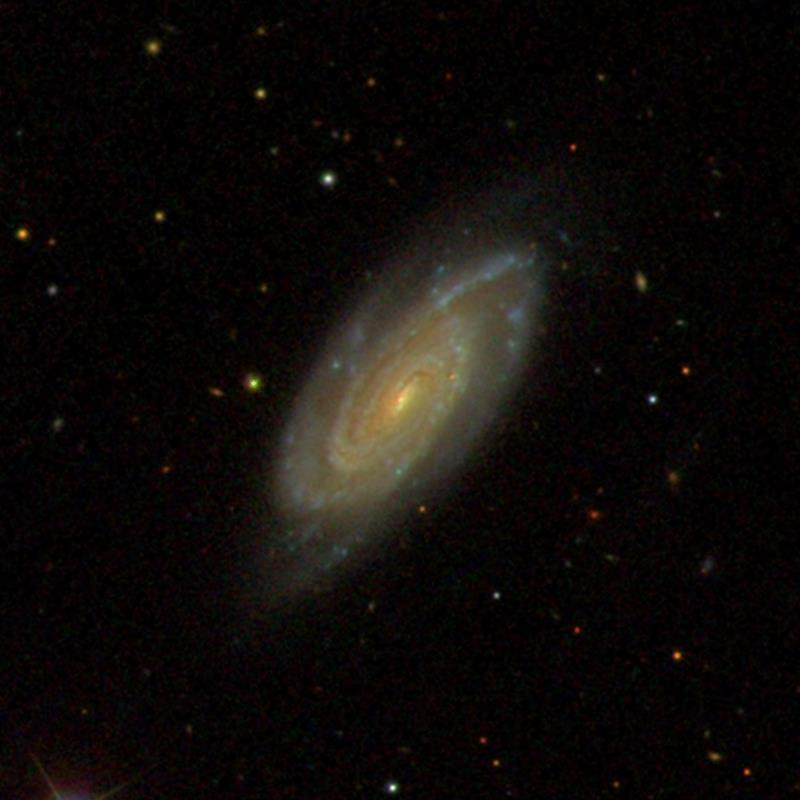
- NGC 5875 imaged by Sloan Digital Sky Survey

Observation data (J2000 epoch)
- Constellation: Boötes
- Right ascension: 15^{h} 09^{m} 13.1946^{s}
- Declination: +52° 31′ 42.472″
- Redshift: 0.011695
- Heliocentric radial velocity: 3506 ± 2 km/s
- Distance: 172.4 ± 12.1 Mly (52.87 ± 3.70 Mpc)
- Apparent magnitude (V): 12.4

Characteristics
- Type: SAb?
- Size: ~116,800 ly (35.80 kpc) (estimated)
- Apparent size (V): 2.3′ × 1.2′

Other designations
- IRAS 15077+5243, 2MASX J15091320+5231418, UGC 9745, MCG +09-25-027, PGC 54095, CGCG 274-027

NGC 5875 is a spiral galaxy in the constellation of Boötes. Its velocity with respect to the cosmic microwave background is 3585 ± 6 km/s, which corresponds to a Hubble distance of 52.87 ± 3.70 Mpc (~173 million light-years). It was discovered by German-British astronomer William Herschel on 1 May 1788.

The SIMBAD database lists NGC 5875 as a Seyfert II Galaxy, i.e. it has a quasar-like nuclei with very high surface brightnesses whose spectra reveal strong, high-ionisation emission lines, but unlike quasars, the host galaxy is clearly detectable.

== Supernovae ==
Two supernovae have been observed in NGC 5875:

- SN 2022oqm (Type Ic-pec, mag. 17.3) was discovered by the Zwicky Transient Facility on 11 July 2022. This supernova has been described as one of the brightest calcium-rich supernovae known.
- SN 2023ldh (Type IIn, mag. 20.7423) was discovered by the Zwicky Transient Facility on 28 May 2023.

== See also ==
- List of NGC objects (5001–6000)
