= NGC 7714 =

Galaxy in the constellation Pisces

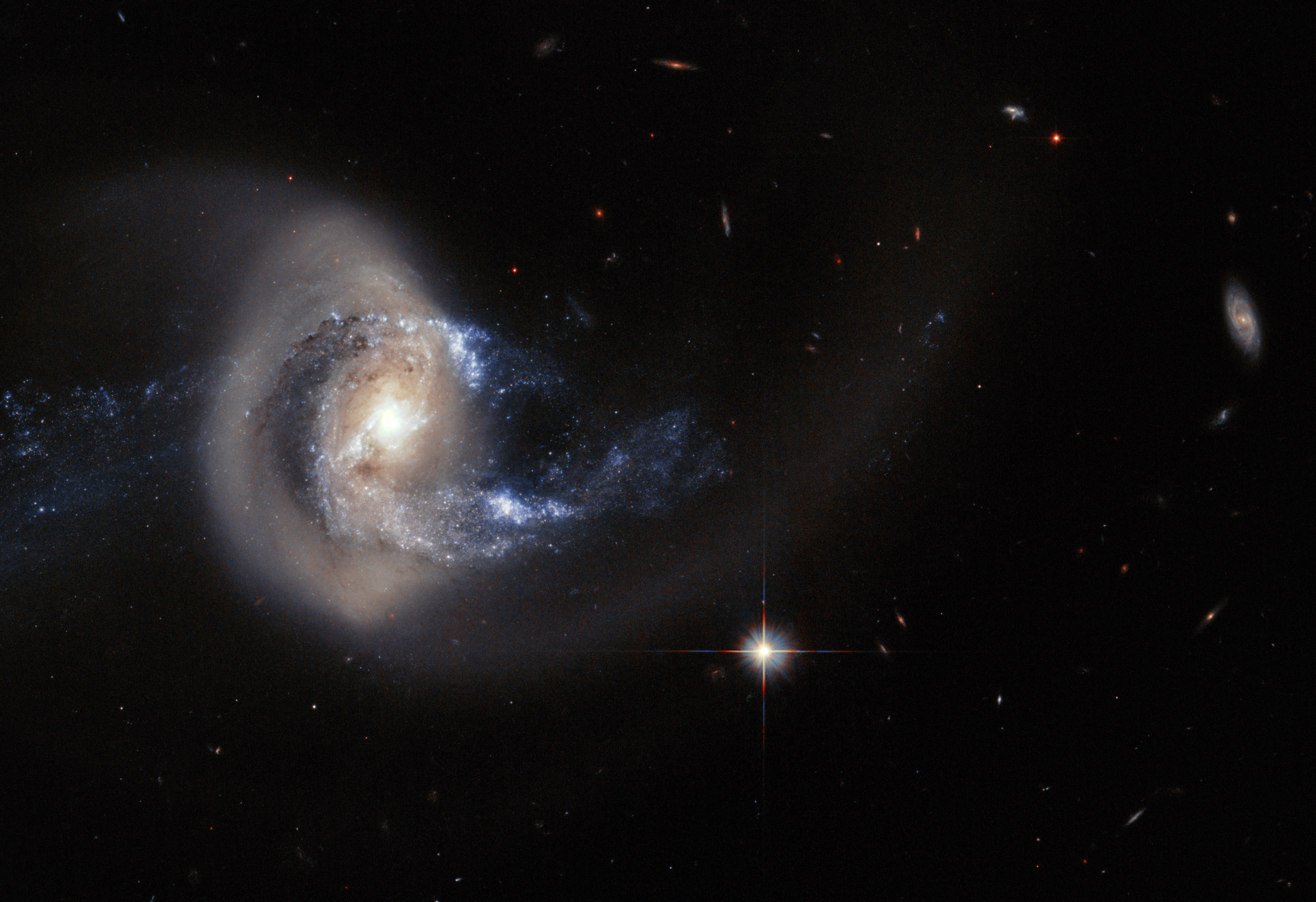
- NGC 7714 imaged by the Hubble Space Telescope

Observation data (J2000 epoch)
- Constellation: Pisces
- Right ascension: 23^{h} 36^{m} 14.1232^{s}
- Declination: +02° 09′ 18.133″
- Redshift: 0.009333
- Heliocentric radial velocity: 2798 ± 1 km/s
- Distance: 116.9 ± 8.3 Mly (35.85 ± 2.54 Mpc)
- Apparent magnitude (V): 12.2

Characteristics
- Type: SB:(s)b? pec, HII
- Size: ~67,100 ly (20.57 kpc) (estimated)
- Apparent size (V): 1.90 × 1.4 moa

Other designations
- KCPG 587A, UM 167, HOLM 810A, IRAS 23336+0152, Arp 284, UGC 12699, MCG +00-60-017, Mrk 538, PGC 71868, CGCG 381-011, VV 51

NGC 7714 is a spiral galaxy in the constellation Pisces. Its velocity with respect to the cosmic microwave background is 2430 ± 26 km/s, which corresponds to a Hubble distance of 116.9 ± 8.3 Mly (35.85 ± 2.54 Mpc). In addition, five non-redshift measurements give a distance of 92.24 ± 8.69 Mly (28.280 ± 2.664 Mpc). It was discovered by British astronomer John Herschel on 18 September 1830.

NGC 7714 and NGC 7715 are interacting galaxies. The pair are included in Halton Arp's Atlas of Peculiar Galaxies, listed as Arp 284. NGC 7714 appears to be a highly distorted spiral, possibly a barred spiral galaxy. NGC 7715 is of uncertain type, probably an edge-on spiral or an irregular galaxy.

NGC 7714 and NGC 7715 is considered to be in a galaxy group known as LGG 479. It has at least 5 members, NGC 7714, NGC 7715, NGC 7716, UGC 12690 and UGC 12709.

== Supernovae ==
Three supernovae have been observed in NGC 7714:

- SN 1999dn (Type Ib/c, mag. 16.3) was discovered by the BAO Supernova Survey on 19 August 1999.
- SN 2007fo (Type Ib/c, mag. 18.2) was discovered by the Lick Observatory Supernova Search on 9 July 2007.
- SN 2023pso (Type Ib, mag. 17.15) was discovered by GOTO on 7 August 2023.

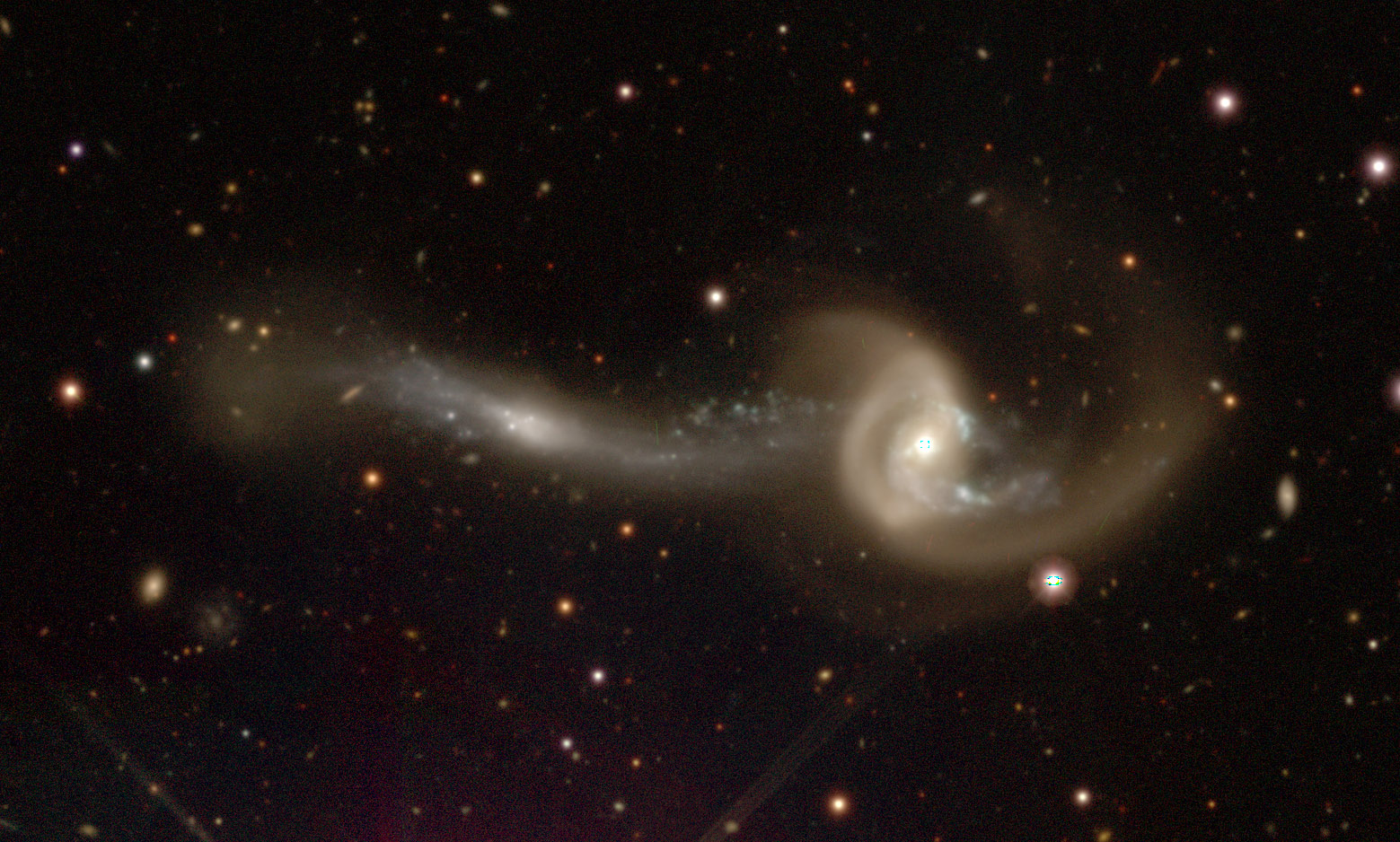
NGC 7714 (right) and NGC 7715 (left) imaged by legacy surveys

== See also ==
- List of NGC objects (7001–7840)
