= NGC 5251 =

Galaxy in the constellation Boötes

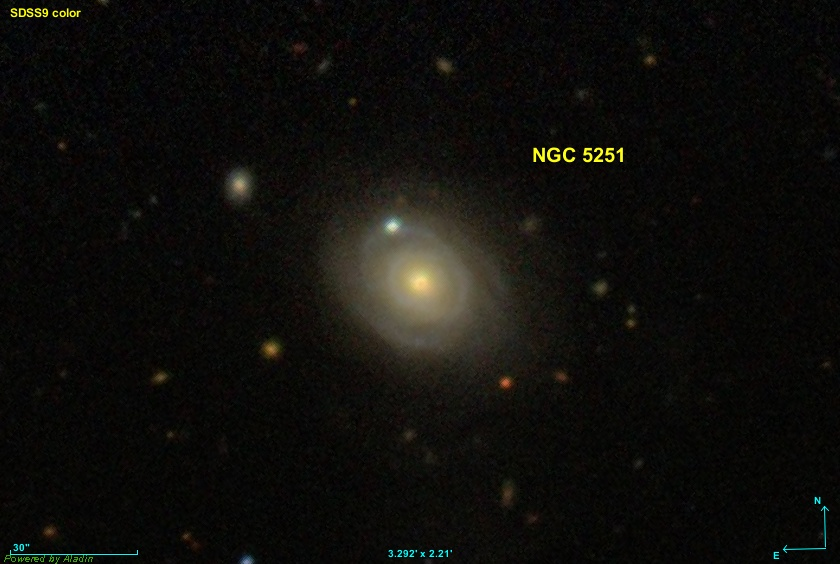
- NGC 5251 imaged by SDSS

Observation data (J2000 epoch)
- Constellation: Boötes
- Right ascension: 13^{h} 37^{m} 24.7565^{s}
- Declination: +27° 25′ 09.993″
- Redshift: 0.036558
- Heliocentric radial velocity: 10960 ± 3 km/s
- Distance: 538.9 ± 37.7 Mly (165.22 ± 11.57 Mpc)
- Apparent magnitude (V): 13.9

Characteristics
- Type: S?
- Size: ~183,100 ly (56.14 kpc) (estimated)
- Apparent size (V): 0.7′ × 0.7′

Other designations
- IRAS F13351+2740, 2MASX J13372485+2725097, MCG +05-32-044, PGC 48119, CGCG 161-090

NGC 5251 is a barred spiral galaxy in the constellation of Boötes. Its velocity with respect to the cosmic microwave background is 11202 ± 17 km/s, which corresponds to a Hubble distance of 165.22 ± 11.57 Mpc (~539 million light-years). It was discovered by German-British astronomer William Herschel on 11 April 1785.

The SIMBAD database lists NGC 5251 as a LINER galaxy, i.e. a galaxy whose nucleus has an emission spectrum characterized by broad lines of weakly ionized atoms.

== Supernova ==
One supernova has been observed in NGC 5251.

- SN 2024bci (Type Ia, mag. 18.77) was discovered by the GOTO telescope array on 24 January 2024.

== See also ==
- List of NGC objects (5001–6000)
