= NGC 2719 =

Galaxy in the constellation Lynx

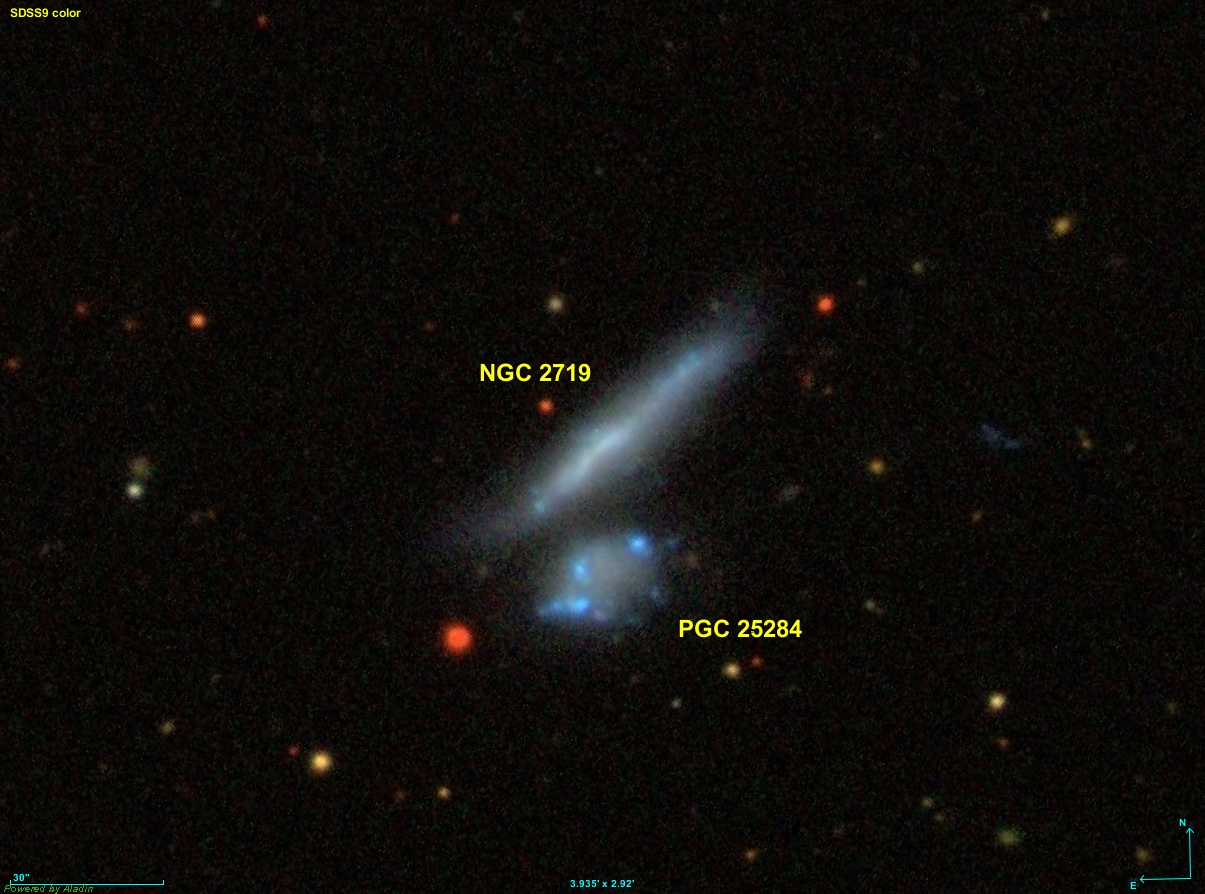
- NGC 2719 and PGC 25284 imaged by SDSS

Observation data (J2000 epoch)
- Constellation: Lynx
- Right ascension: 09^{h} 00^{m} 15.4773^{s}
- Declination: +35° 43′ 40.594″
- Redshift: 0.010264
- Heliocentric radial velocity: 3077 ± 4 km/s
- Distance: 158.8 ± 11.2 Mly (48.70 ± 3.42 Mpc)
- Group or cluster: Arp 202
- Apparent magnitude (V): 13.1

Characteristics
- Type: Im pec?
- Size: ~62,700 ly (19.22 kpc) (estimated)
- Apparent size (V): 1.1′ × 0.3′

Other designations
- Holm 105A, 2MASX J09001576+3543387, Arp 202, UGC 4718, MCG +06-20-017, PGC 25281, CGCG 180-025

NGC 2719 is a Magellanic irregular galaxy in the constellation of Lynx. Its velocity with respect to the cosmic microwave background is 3302 ± 16 km/s, which corresponds to a Hubble distance of 158.8 ± 11.2 Mly (48.70 ± 3.42 Mpc). In addition, one non redshift measurement gives a distance of 154 Mly (47.2 Mpc). The galaxy was discovered by German-British astronomer William Herschel on 28 March 1786.

Together with the galaxy PGC 25284 (also known as NGC 2719A), NGC 2719 is listed in Halton Arp's Atlas of Peculiar Galaxies as Arp 202. The galaxy pair is also listed as Holm 105 in Erik Holmberg's A Study of Double and Multiple Galaxies Together with Inquiries into some General Metagalactic Problems, published in 1937.

== Supernovae ==
Two supernovae have been observed in NGC 2719:

- SN 2024xkd (Type II, mag. 18.84) was discovered by GOTO on 6 October 2024.
- SN 2026ahyg (Type II-P, mag. 19.2701) was discovered by the Zwicky Transient Facility on 1 October 2026.

== Image gallery ==
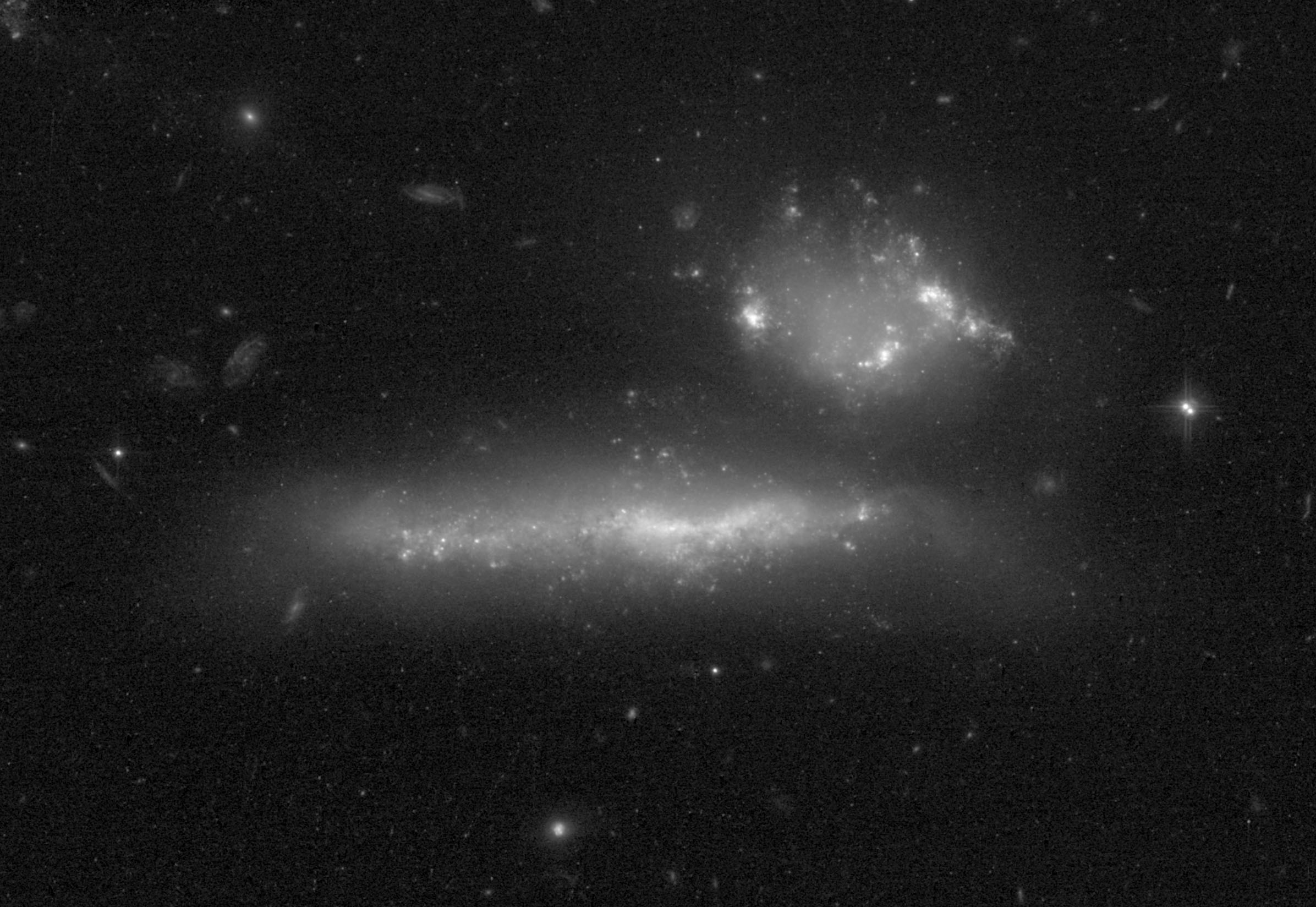
Arp 202 imaged by the Hubble Space Telescope

== See also ==
- List of NGC objects
- List of NGC objects (2001–3000)
