= NGC 5559 =

Galaxy in the constellation Boötes

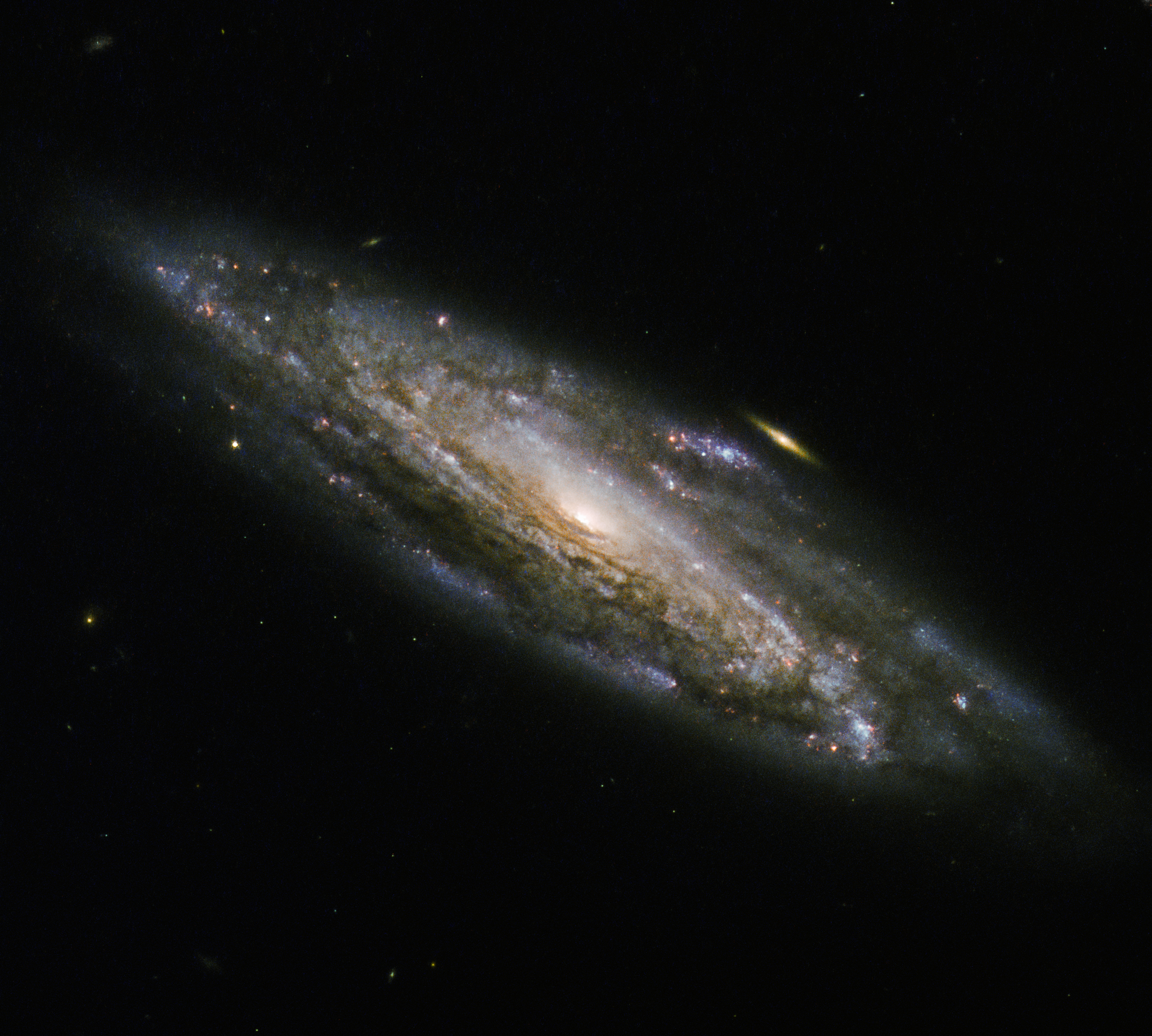
- NGC 5559 taken by Hubble Space Telescope.

Observation data (J2000 epoch)
- Constellation: Boötes
- Right ascension: 14^{h} 19^{m} 12.792^{s}
- Declination: +24° 47′ 55.01″
- Redshift: 0.01717
- Heliocentric radial velocity: 5103 ± 3 km/s
- Distance: 252.1 Mly (77.30 Mpc)
- Apparent magnitude (B): 14.81

Characteristics
- Type: SBb

Other designations
- UGC 9166, MCG +04-34-017, PGC 51155

NGC 5559 is a barred spiral galaxy, located 240 million light-years away in the constellation of Boötes. It was discovered by German-British astronomer William Herschel on April 10, 1785.

== Supernova ==
One supernova has been observed in NGC 5559:

- SN 2001co (Type Ib, mag. 18.5) was discovered by LOTOSS (Lick Observatory and Tenagra Observatory Supernova Searches) on 11 June 2001. However, in 2003, the supernova was identified as a calcium-rich supernova, as it had strong spectral lines characteristic of calcium. The progenitors of these calcium-rich supernovae are still a mystery.

== See also ==
- Spiral galaxy
