= NGC 1032 =

Spiral galaxy in the constellation Cetus

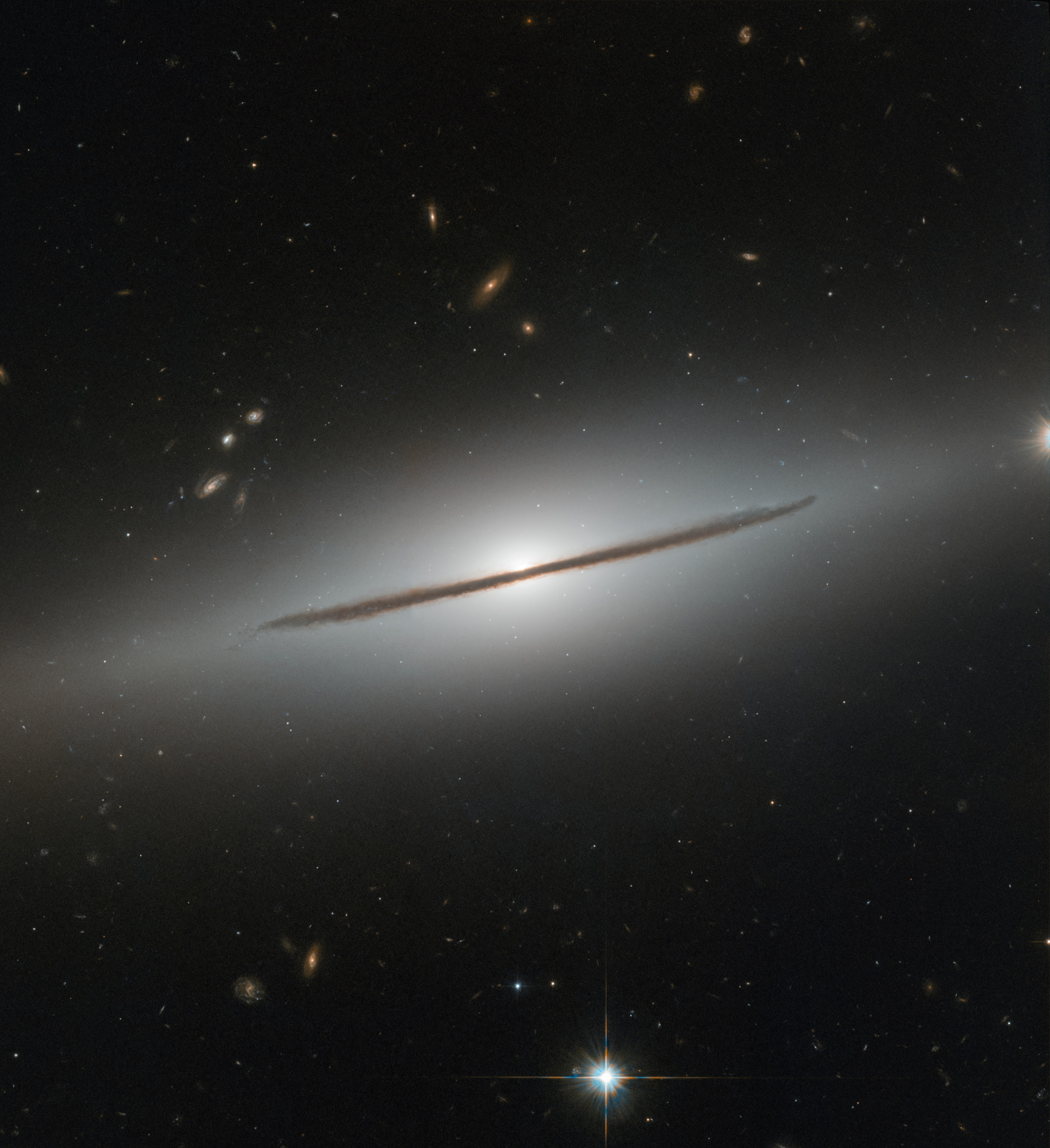
- NGC 1032 imaged by the Hubble Space Telescope.

Observation data (J2000 epoch)
- Constellation: Cetus
- Right ascension: 02^{h} 39^{m} 23.6575^{s}
- Declination: +01° 05′ 37.729″
- Redshift: 0.009150±0.000012
- Heliocentric radial velocity: 2,743±4 km/s
- Distance: 121.0 ± 8.5 Mly (37.09 ± 2.61 Mpc)
- Apparent magnitude (V): 12.1B

Characteristics
- Type: S0/a
- Apparent size (V): 3.3′ × 1.1′

Other designations
- IRAS F02367+0052, 2MASX J02392368+0105376, UGC 2147, MCG +00-07-073, PGC 10060, CGCG 388-086

NGC 1032 is a spiral galaxy that is about 121 million light-years away in the constellation Cetus. It was discovered by German-British astronomer William Herschel on 18 December 1783.

NGC 1032 is an Active Galaxy Nucleus Candidate, i.e. it has a compact region at the center of a galaxy that emits a significant amount of energy across the electromagnetic spectrum, with characteristics indicating that this luminosity is not produced by the stars.

== Supernova ==
One supernova has been observed in NGC 1032. SN 2005E (type gap, mag. 16.8) was discovered by the Lick Observatory Supernova Search (LOSS) on 13 January 2005. It was initially classified as Type Ib or Type Ic. However, later analysis determined that it was instead a calcium-rich supernova (also known as a "gap" transient), a (then) new type of astronomical transient.
