= SN 2005E =

Supernova in the constellation Cetus

- Event type: Supernova
- SN.Ib/c
- Constellation: Cetus
- Other designations: SN 2005E

SN 2005E (aka 2005-1032) was a calcium-rich supernova first observed in January 2005 that scientists concluded was a new type of cosmic explosion. The explosion originated in the galaxy NGC 1032, approximately 100 million light years away.

Location: 02^{h} 39^{m} 14.34^{s} +01° 05′ 55.0″ (Epoch J2000)

== Research and Conclusions ==
On May 19, 2010, a team of astronomers released a report on the discoveries made in their research of SN 2005E. The articles were published in the British journal Nature.

The researchers have determined that the blast emitted a large amount of calcium and titanium, which is evidence of a nuclear reaction involving helium, instead of the carbon and oxygen that is characteristic of Type Ia supernovae.
