= NGC 4589 =

Galaxy in the constellation Draco

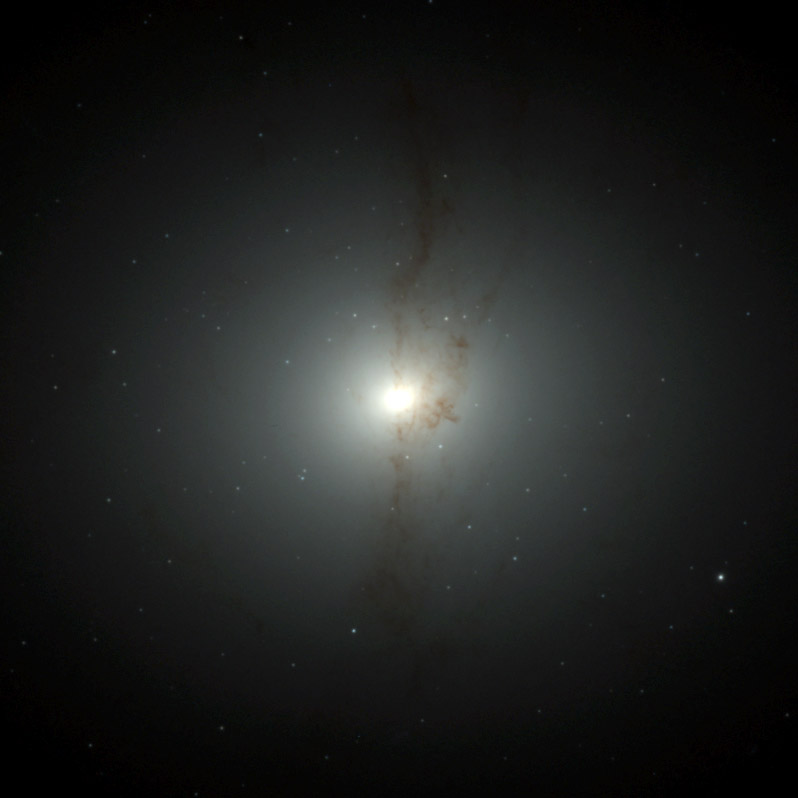
- NGC 4589 imaged by the Hubble Space Telescope

Observation data (J2000 epoch)
- Constellation: Draco
- Right ascension: 12^{h} 37^{m} 24.9875^{s}
- Declination: +74° 11′ 30.903″
- Redshift: 0.006617
- Heliocentric radial velocity: 2,002 km/s
- Galactocentric velocity: 2,154 km/s
- Distance: 73.03 ± 0.46 Mly (22.39 ± 0.14 Mpc)
- Apparent magnitude (V): 10.73±0.15
- Apparent magnitude (B): 11.69±0.15
- Absolute magnitude (V): −21.41±0.23

Characteristics
- Type: E2
- Apparent size (V): 3.47′ × 2.75′

Other designations
- IRAS F12353+7428, NGC 4589, UGC 7797, LEDA 42139

NGC 4589 is an elliptical galaxy located in the constellation of Draco. It was discovered by German-British astronomer William Herschel on November 22, 1797. This galaxy lies at a distance of 73.0 million light-years (22.39 Mpc) from the Milky Way, and is receding with a heliocentric radial velocity of 2,002 km/s. It is known by its designations PGC 42139 or UGC 7797.

The morphological classification of NGC 4589 is E2 in the De Vaucouleurs system, Indicating this is an elliptical galaxy with a ratio of 5:4 between the major and minor axes. It is a bright source of X-ray emission and is a LINER-type galaxy. There is a dusty disk that is aligned with the minor axis, which is likely the remnant of a merger with a gas-rich galaxy. NGC 4589 has a large population of globular clusters, estimated at 640±50. A small population of young star clusters with an age of less than a billion years are located in the central region.

The calcium-rich type Ib supernova SN 2005cz was discovered on July 28, 2005. The progenitor star may have formed near the young stellar clusters at the core of NGC 4589.

== Gallery ==
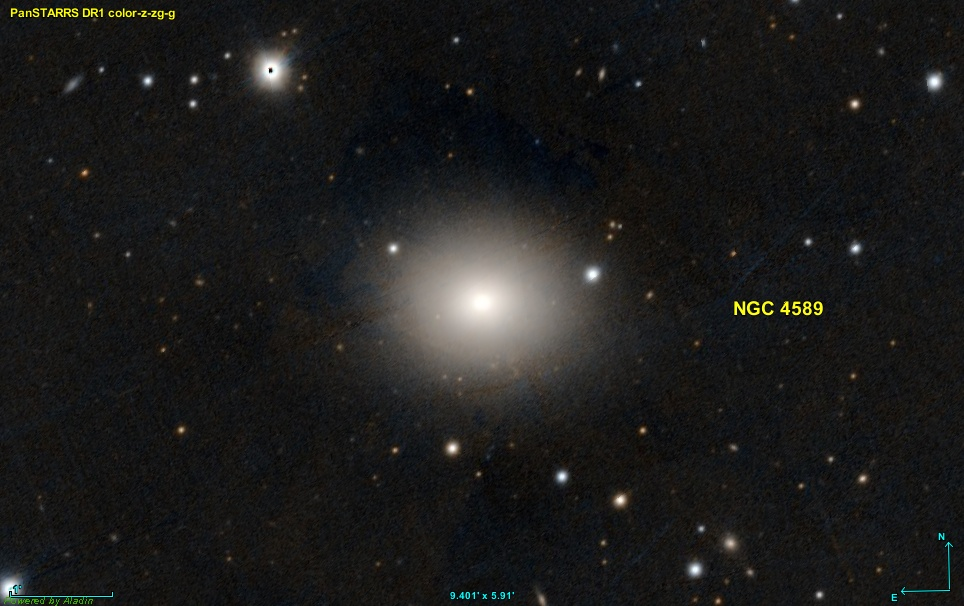
NGC 4589 by Pan-STARRS

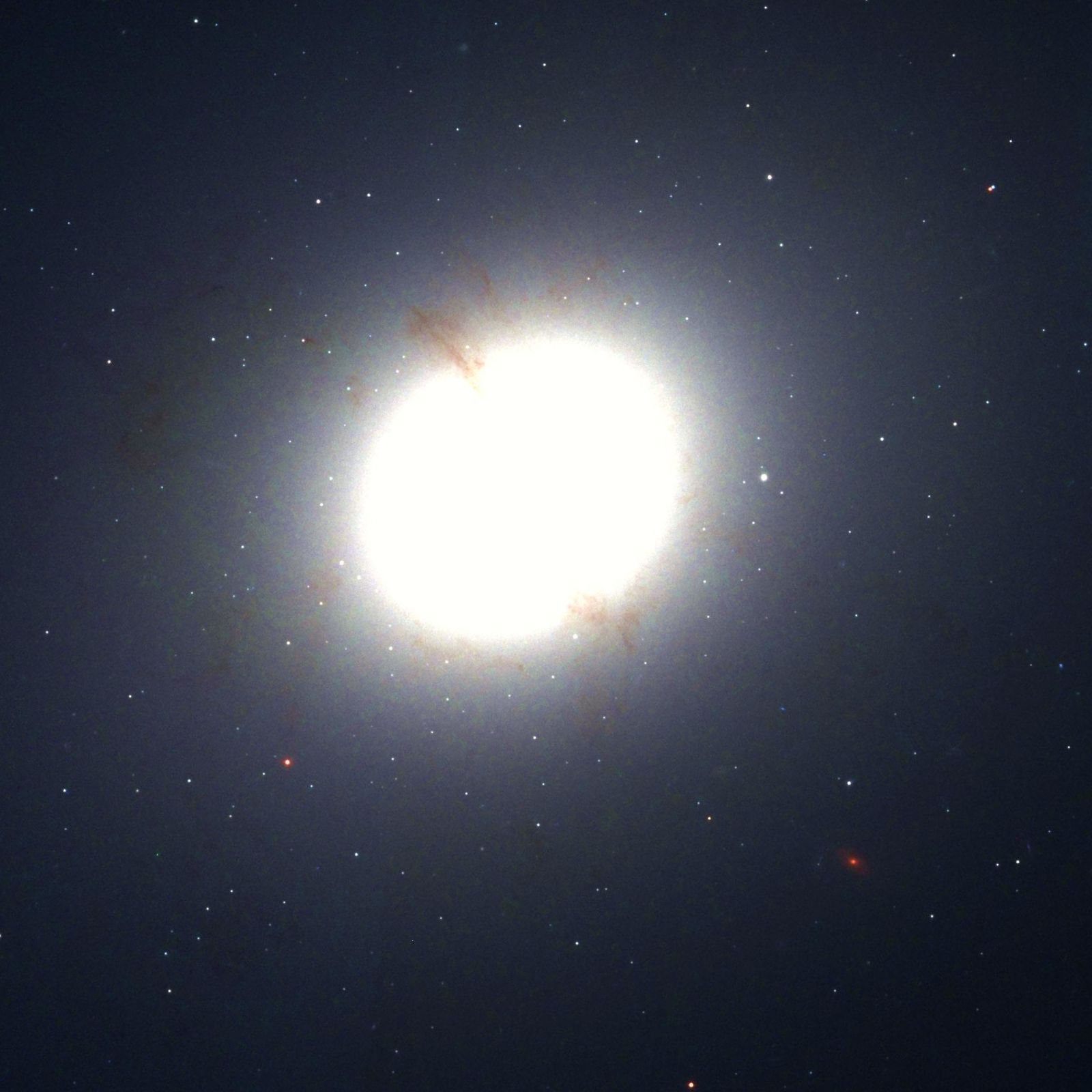
NGC 4589 by HST

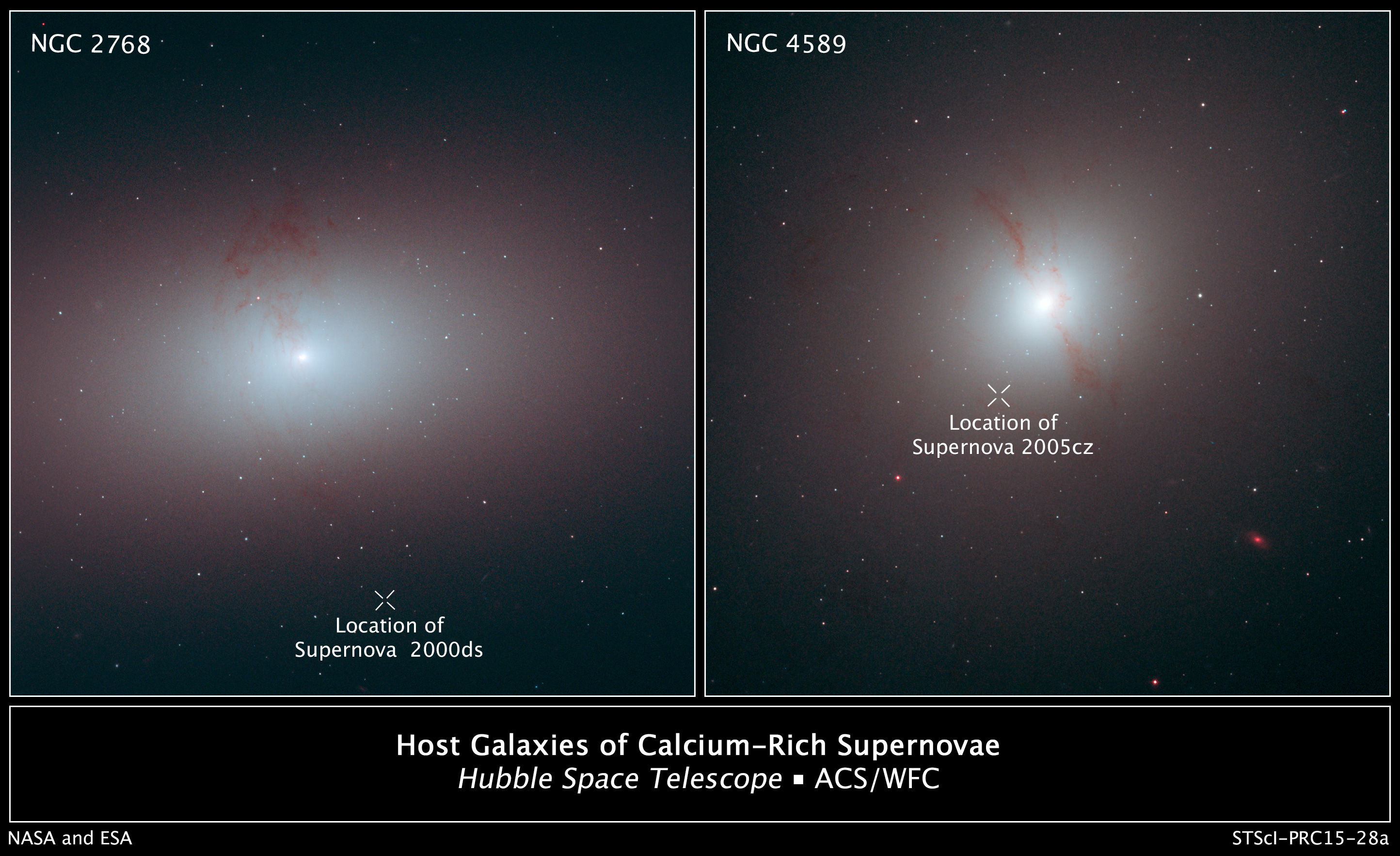
A comparison of NGC 2768's and NGC 4589's supernovae
