= NGC 3277 =

Galaxy in the constellation Leo Minor

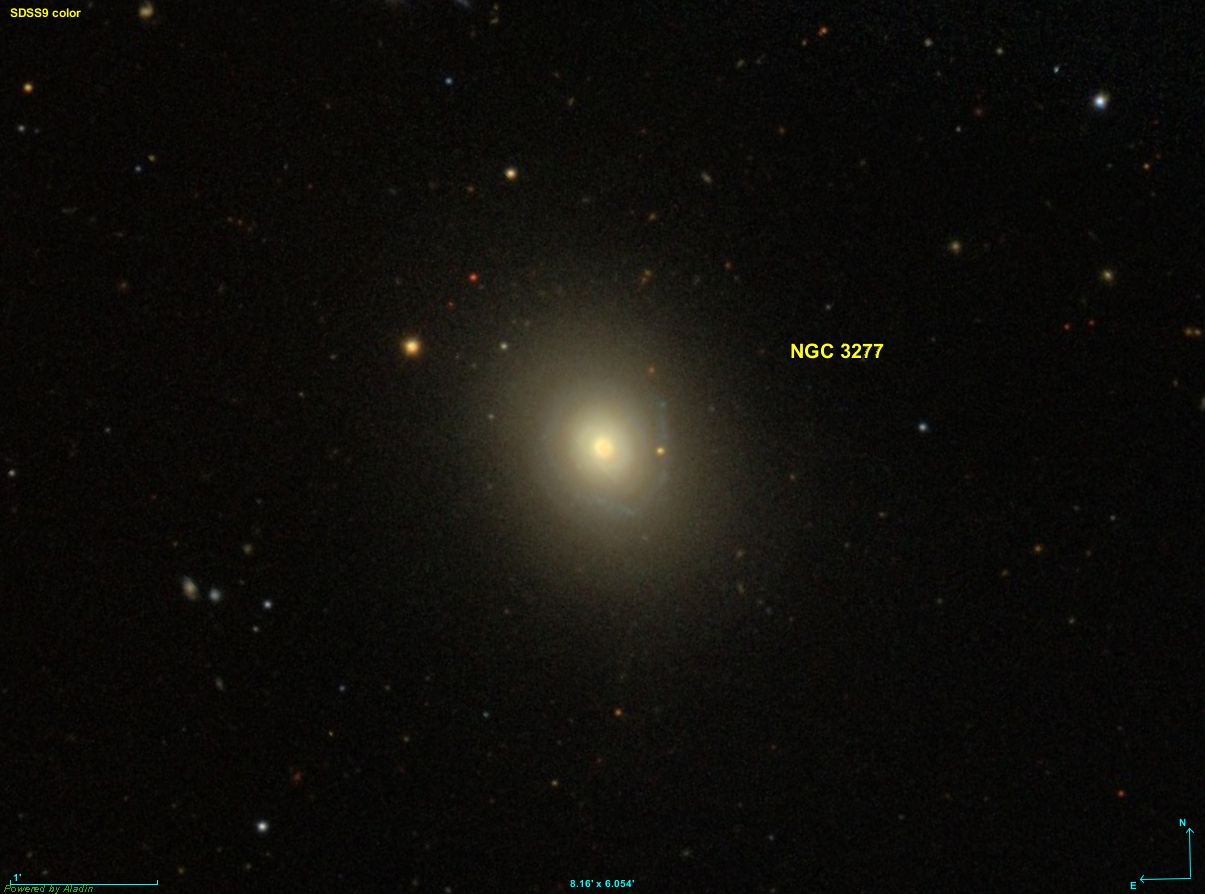
- NGC 3277 imaged by SDSS

Observation data (J2000 epoch)
- Constellation: Leo Minor
- Right ascension: 10^{h} 32^{m} 55.4506^{s}
- Declination: +28° 30′ 42.409″
- Redshift: 0.004720±0.00000900
- Heliocentric radial velocity: 1,415±3 km/s
- Distance: 148.34 ± 17.58 Mly (45.480 ± 5.389 Mpc)
- Group or cluster: NGC 3254 group (LGG 197)
- Apparent magnitude (V): 11.7

Characteristics
- Type: SA(r)ab
- Size: ~103,600 ly (31.75 kpc) (estimated)
- Apparent size (V): 2.1′ × 1.8′

Other designations
- IRAS 10301+2846, 2MASX J10325545+2830422, UGC 5731, MCG +05-25-022, PGC 31166, CGCG 154-026

NGC 3277 is a spiral galaxy in the constellation of Leo Minor. Its velocity with respect to the cosmic microwave background is 1,712±21 km/s, which corresponds to a Hubble distance of 82.4 ± 5.9 Mly (25.26 ± 1.80 Mpc). However, five non-redshift measurements give a much farther mean distance of 148.34 ± 17.58 Mly (45.480 ± 5.389 Mpc). It was discovered by German-British astronomer William Herschel on 11 April 1785.

NGC 3277 is a Seyfert II galaxy, i.e. it has a quasar-like nucleus with very high surface brightnesses whose spectra reveal strong, high-ionisation emission lines, but unlike quasars, the host galaxy is clearly detectable.

== NGC 3254 group ==
NGC 3277 is a member of the NGC 3254 group (also known as LGG 197), which contains five galaxies, including NGC 3245A, NGC 3245, NGC 3254, and NGC 3265.

== Supernova ==
One Supernova has been observed in NGC 3277:

- SN 2025coe (Type Ib-Ca-rich, mag. 17.4) was discovered by Kōichi Itagaki on 24 February 2025. Its light curves displayed multiple distinct peaks which is very rare among known calcium-rich supernovae, with only SN 2019ehk showing similar features. It had an exceptionally large projected physical offset of ~39.3 kpc (~317.7″) from the galactic center, making it the most distant multi-peaked calcium-rich supernova ever discovered relative to its host galaxy. The progenitor system might have been ejected through dynamical interactions.

== See also ==
- List of NGC objects (3001–4000)
