= NGC 4331 =

Galaxy in the constellation Draco

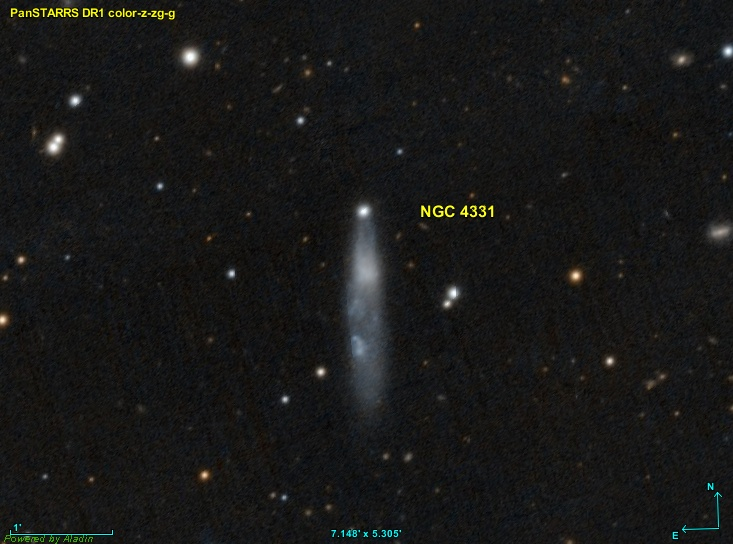
- Image of NGC 4331 by PanSTARRS.

Observation data (J2000 epoch)
- Constellation: Draco
- Right ascension: 12^{h} 22^{m} 35.9^{s}
- Declination: 76° 10′ 21″
- Redshift: 0.005234
- Heliocentric radial velocity: 1569 km/s
- Distance: 73.8 Mly (22.63 Mpc)
- Group or cluster: NGC 4291 Group
- Apparent magnitude (V): 14.64

Characteristics
- Type: Im?
- Size: ~48,100 ly (14.74 kpc) (estimated)
- Apparent size (V): 2.2 x 0.4

Other designations
- UGC 07449, PGC 040085, MCG +13-09-026, VII Zw 451

NGC 4331 is an irregular galaxy located 74 million light-years away in the constellation Draco. The galaxy was discovered by astronomer William Herschel on December 12, 1797. The galaxy is host to a black hole with an estimated mass of 4.6×10^{5} solar masses.

NGC 4331 is a member of the NGC 4291 Group, which also contains the active galaxy NGC 4319 and is an X-ray bright member of the group. The NGC 4291 Group is located within the Canes Venatici-Camelopardalis Cloud, which lies in the First Upper Plane of the Virgo Supercluster.

== See also ==
- List of NGC objects (4001–5000)
