= NGC 7716 =

Spiral galaxy in the constellation Pisces

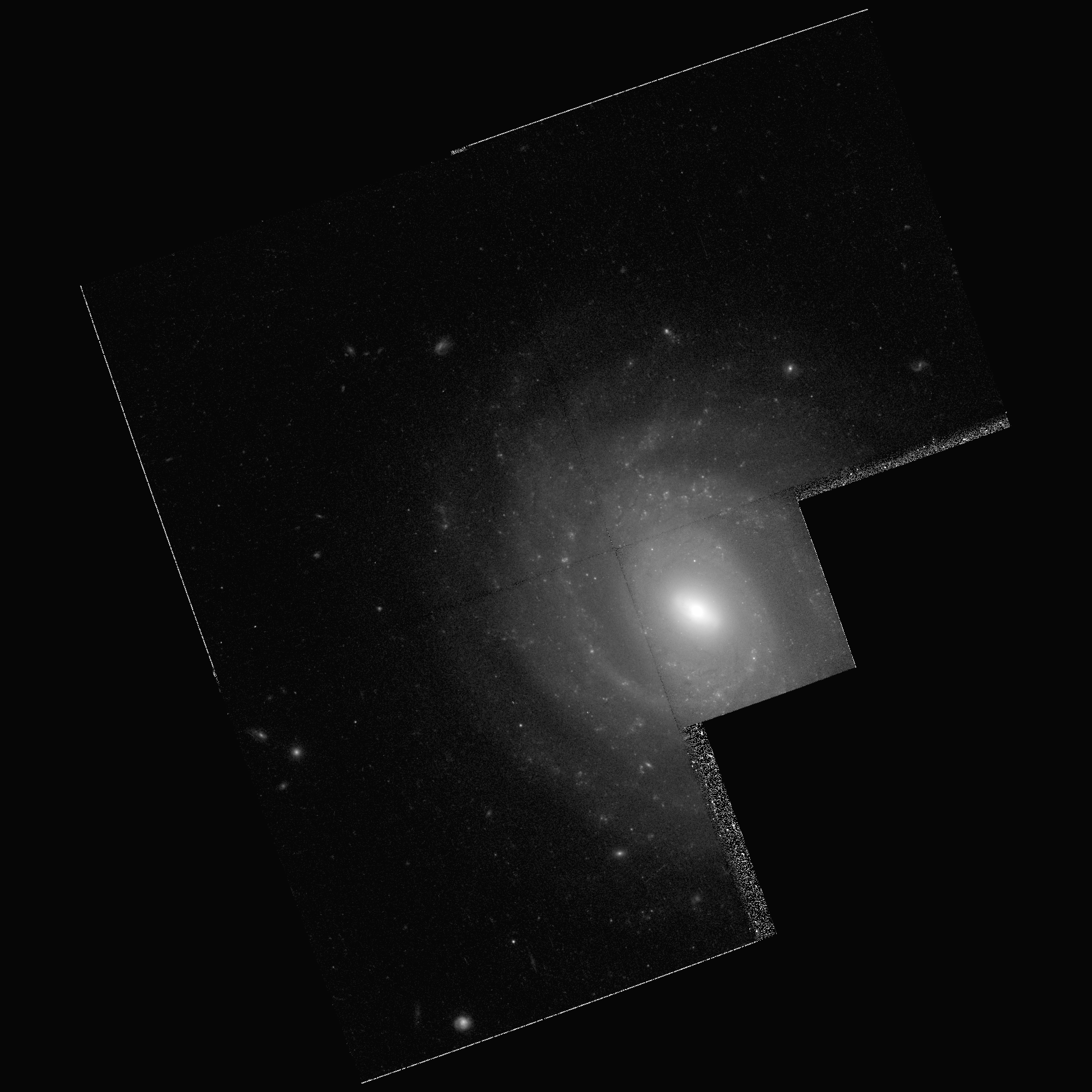
- NGC 7716, as seen by the Hubble Space Telescope

Observation data (J2000 epoch)
- Constellation: Pisces
- Right ascension: 23h 36m 30s
- Declination: +00° 17′ 50″
- Apparent magnitude (B): 12.9
- Surface brightness: 22.75 mag/arcsec2

Characteristics
- Type: SAb

Other designations
- PGC 71883, UGC 12702, MCG 0-60-19, CGCG 381-13, IRAS 23339+0001

NGC 7716 is an intermediate spiral galaxy located in the constellation Pisces. Its speed relative to the cosmic microwave background is 2,201 ± 26 km/s, which corresponds to a Hubble distance of 32.5 ± 2.3 Mpc (~106 million ly). NGC 7716 was discovered by British astronomer John Herschel in 1831.

The luminosity class of NGC 7716 is II and it has a broad HI line. According to the SIMBAD database, NGC 7716 is a candidate galaxy for the active galaxy classification.

To date, twelve non-redshift measurements give a distance of 32.442 ± 5.854 Mpc (~106 million ly), which is within the Hubble distance values.

== NGC 7716 group ==
NGC 7716 is a member of a galaxy group of the same name. NGC 7716 group contains 5 members. The other galaxies in this group are NGC 7714, NGC 7715, UGC 12690 and UGC 12709.

== See also ==
- List of NGC objects (7001–7840)
