= NGC 801 =

Spiral galaxy in the constellation Andromeda

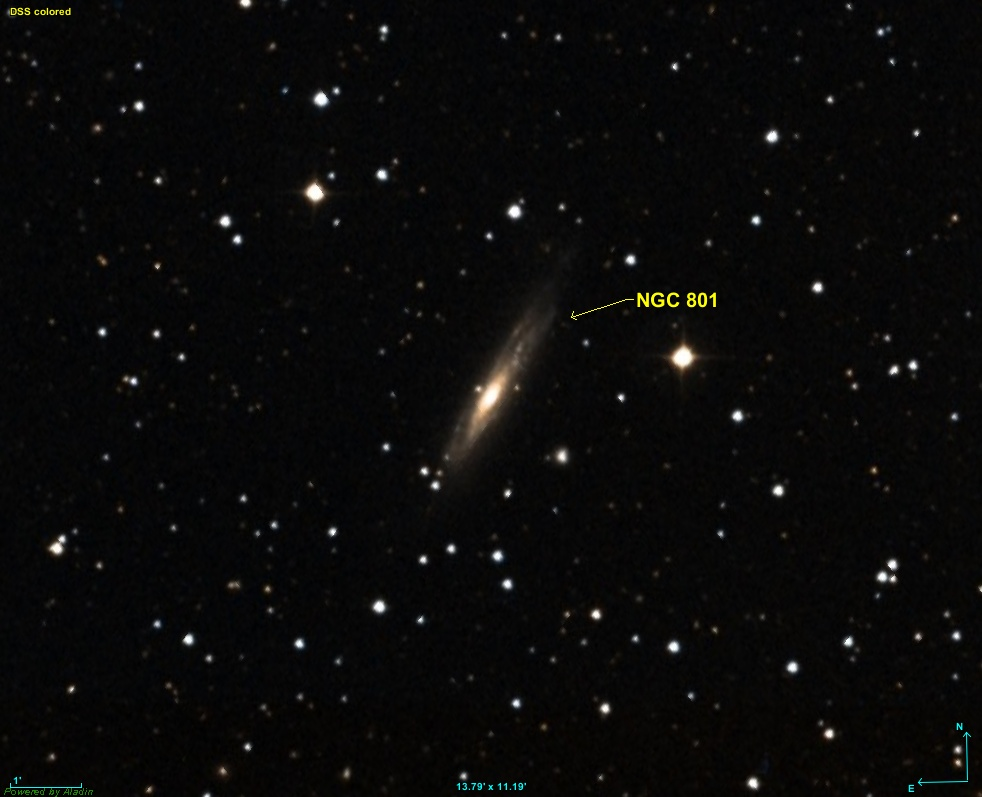
- NGC 801

Observation data (J2000 epoch)
- Constellation: Andromeda
- Right ascension: 02^{h} 03^{m} 44.79408^{s}
- Declination: +38° 15′ 31.6246″
- Redshift: 0.019187±0.000090
- Heliocentric radial velocity: 5,772 km/s
- Distance: 174.4 Mly (53.46 Mpc)

Characteristics
- Type: Sc
- Size: 189.2 kly (58.01 kpc)
- Apparent size (V): 1.280′ × 0.461′

Other designations
- NGC 801, UGC 1550, MCG +06-05-079, PGC 7847

NGC 801 is a spiral galaxy with an active galactic nucleus in the constellation Andromeda. It is estimated to be 174 million light-years from the Milky Way and has a diameter of approximately 174,400 light-years. The object was discovered on September 20, 1885 by the American astronomer Lewis A. Swift.
