= NGC 4319 =

Spiral galaxy in the constellation Draco

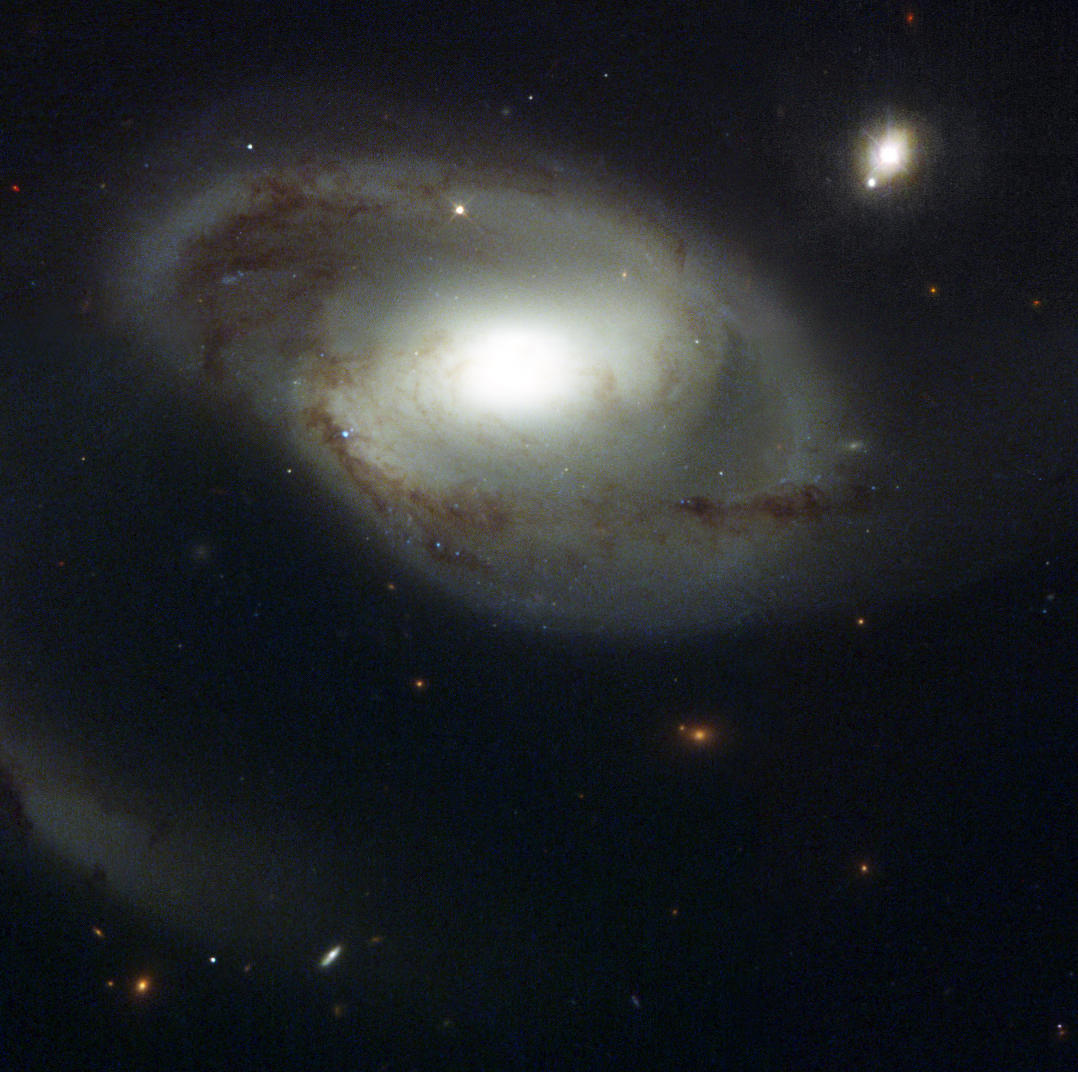
- A Hubble Space Telescope (HST) image of NGC 4319. Quasar Mrk 205 is visible to the upper right.

Observation data (J2000 epoch)
- Constellation: Draco
- Right ascension: 12^{h} 21^{m} 43.846^{s}
- Declination: +75° 19′ 21.45″
- Redshift: 0.004526
- Heliocentric radial velocity: 1,357 ± 46 km/s
- Distance: 76.6 Mly (23.48 Mpc)
- Apparent magnitude (V): 12.8

Characteristics
- Type: SB(r)ab
- Apparent size (V): 3′.0 × 2′.3

Other designations
- NGC 4345, UGC 7429, PGC 39981

NGC 4319 is a face-on barred spiral galaxy located about 77 million light years away in the constellation Draco. The morphological classification is SB(r)ab, which indicates it is a barred spiral with an inner ring structure and moderate to tightly wound arms. It is situated in physical proximity to the galaxies NGC 4291 and NGC 4386, with X-ray emissions from the intervening gap indicating NGC 4319 and NGC 4291 may be interacting. NGC 4319 has a much higher proportion of ionized hydrogen compared to the Milky Way galaxy.

== Controversy over a physical connection with Markarian 205 ==
In 1971, American astronomer Halton Arp noted what appeared to be a physical connection between NGC 4319 and Markarian 205, a quasi-stellar object with a much higher redshift. He suggested that if Markarian 205 is not an accidentally projected background object, then it may instead have been ejected from the nucleus of this galaxy. The discovery of an apparent luminous connection between the two created a storm of controversy as astronomers sought to refute the assertion and provide other explanations. The matter was effectively settled when observations using the Hubble Space Telescope showed that the light from Markarian 205 was passing through the disk and halo of NGC 4319 to reach the observer, placing Markarian 205 behind this galaxy and thus further away.
