= Calcium-rich supernova =

Supernovae which contain high amounts of Calcium

In astronomy, a calcium-rich supernova (or Calcium-rich transient, Ca-rich SN) is a subclass of supernovae that, in contrast to more well-known traditional supernova classes, are fainter and produce unusually large amounts of calcium. Since their luminosity is located in a gap between that of novae and other supernovae, they are also referred to as "gap" transients. Only around 15 events have been classified as a calcium-rich supernova (as of August 2017) – a combination of their intrinsic rarity and low luminosity make new discoveries and their subsequent study difficult. This makes calcium-rich supernovae one of the most mysterious supernova subclasses currently known.

== Origins and classification ==
A peculiar group of supernova that were unusually rich in calcium were identified by Alexei Filippenko and collaborators. Although they appeared somewhat similar to Type Ib and Ic supernovae, their spectra were dominated by calcium, without other signatures often seen in Type Ib and Ic supernovae, and the term calcium-rich was coined to describe them. Subsequent discoveries led to the classification of empirically similar supernovae. They share characteristics such as quickly rising and fading light curves that peak in luminosity between novae and supernovae, and spectra that are dominated by calcium 2–3 months after initial explosion.

== Explosion mechanism ==
The exact nature of the stellar systems and their subsequent explosions that give rise to calcium-rich supernovae are unknown. Despite appearing similar to Type Ib supernovae, it was noted that a different explosion mechanism was likely to be responsible for calcium-rich supernovae. Since a large proportion of the galaxies from which they are thought to originate are early-type galaxies, and thus composed of old stellar populations, they are unlikely to contain many young, massive stars that give rise to Type Ib supernovae. Supernova explosions in old stellar populations generally involved a white dwarf since these are old systems that can undergo thermonuclear explosion under the right circumstances, as is the case for Type Ia supernovae. However, because calcium-rich supernovae are much less luminous and fade more quickly than normal Type Ia supernovae, it is unlikely that the same mechanism is at play for both.

Another peculiarity of calcium-rich supernovae is that they appear to explode far away from galaxies, even reaching intergalactic space. Searches for faint dwarf galaxies at their locations have ruled that they are exploding in very low density environments, unlike other supernova types.

There are several theories that attempt to explain this behaviour. Binary systems of high-velocity stars, such as two white dwarfs or a white dwarf and a neutron star, that have been ejected from their galaxy either due to a neutron star kick or interaction with the supermassive black hole in their galaxy could produce explosions when they eventually merge (due to gravitational wave radiation) that would preferentially occur far from galaxies. Alternatively they have been suggested to be due to stars that reside in the intracluster medium within large galaxy groups or clusters, having been expelled from their galaxy during mergers or interactions. The explosion would then be caused by the detonation of a low mass white dwarf during a merging event as part of a binary system, or the detonation of a helium shell on a white dwarf.

A calcium-rich supernova event expels several tenths of a solar mass in material at thousands of kilometres per second and reaches a peak luminosity equal to around 100–200 million times that of the Sun. Despite calcium-rich supernovae being comparatively rare and diminutive compared to other supernova types, they are thought to make a significant contribution to the production of calcium in the Universe.

== List ==
Designation	Date	Location	Redshift	Host galaxy	Ejecta mass	Reference
SN 2002bu	March 2002		0.004720±0.00000900	NGC 4242		
SN 2005E	January 2005		2694±18 km/s	NGC 1032	0.275 M_{☉}	
SN 2019bkc	March 2019		0.0209±0.0003	unknown	0.3±0.1 M_{☉}	
AT 2024mxe	August 2024		0.00913 ± 0.000002	NGC 3689		
SN 2025coe	February 2025		0.004720±0.00000900	NGC 3277	0.29 ± 0.15 M_{☉}	
