= GOTO (telescope array) =

Array of robotic optical telescopes

Gravitational-wave Optical Transient Observer
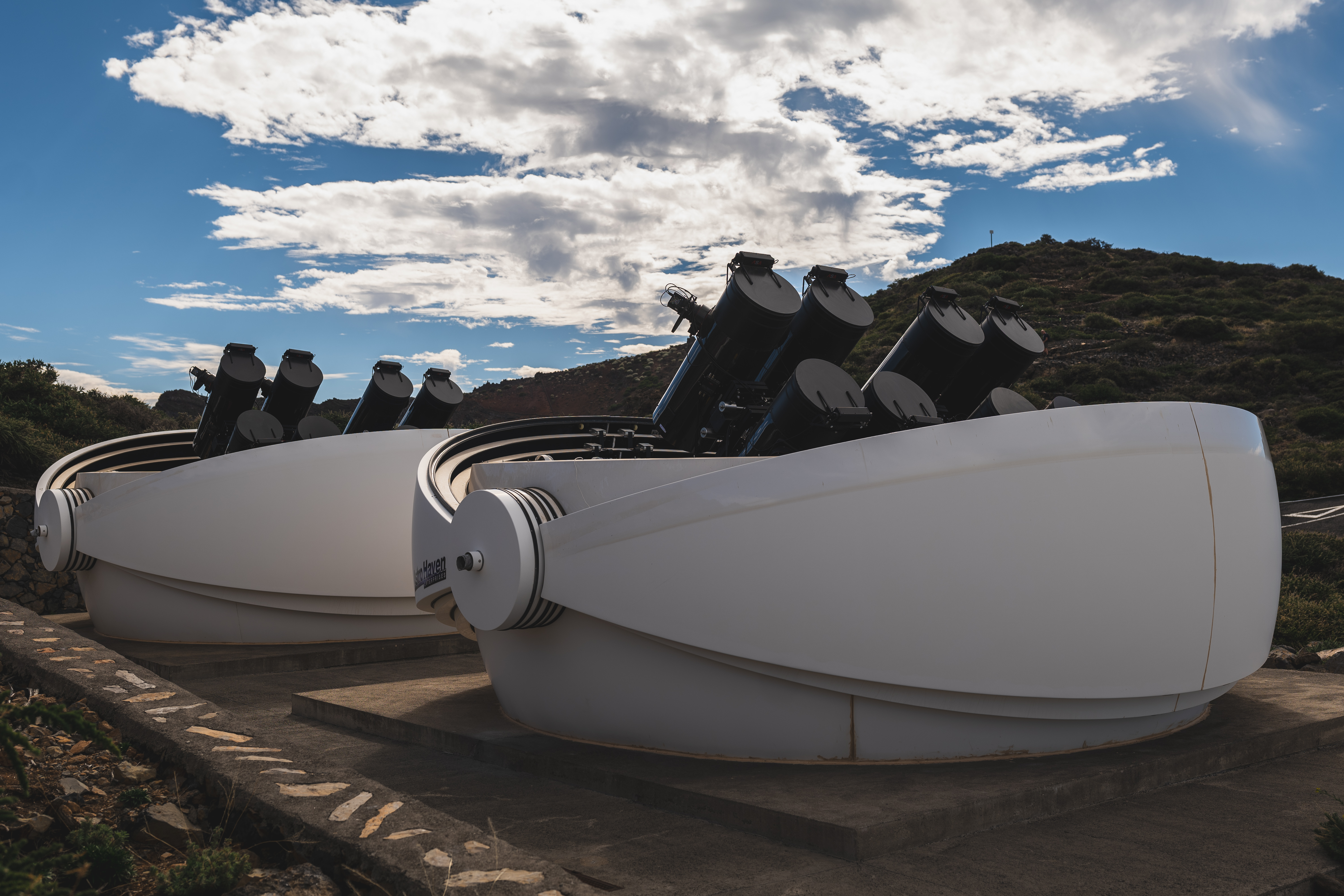
- GOTO-N with both domes open.
- Alternative names: GOTO
- Wavelength: 420 nm (710 THz)–685 nm (438 THz)
- First light: June 2017
- Telescope style: Newtonian
- Diameter: 400 mm (1 ft 4 in)
- Collecting area: 0.4m^{2} per unit telescope, 3.2m^{2} per system, 12.8m^{2} total.
- Focal length: 960mm (f/2.4)
- Mounting: Equatorial
- Website: goto-observatory.org

The Gravitational-wave Optical Transient Observer (GOTO) is an array of robotic optical telescopes optimized for the discovery of optical counterparts to gravitational wave events and other multi-messenger signals. The array consists of a network of telescope systems, with each system consisting of eight 0.4m telescopes on a single mounting.

As of May 2023 the network consists of two sites, each with two systems. GOTO-N (North) located at the Roque de los Muchachos Observatory (ORM) on the island of La Palma, Spain and GOTO-S (South) located at Siding Spring Observatory (SSO), Australia.

The project is run by an international consortium of universities and other research institutes, including the University of Warwick, Monash University, the University of Sheffield, the University of Leicester, Armagh Observatory, the National Astronomical Research Institute of Thailand, the Instituto de Astrofísica de Canarias, the University of Portsmouth, the University of Turku, and the University of Birmingham.

== Design and operation ==
=== Telescopes ===
Each GOTO system can point independently, whilst each unit telescope (UT) has a fixed orientation on the mount so all 8 must be pointed at once. Each UT's pointing is offset from the others to cover the adjacent area of sky, with a small overlap between them. This results in each GOTO system acting as a single telescope with a very wide field of view (FoV).

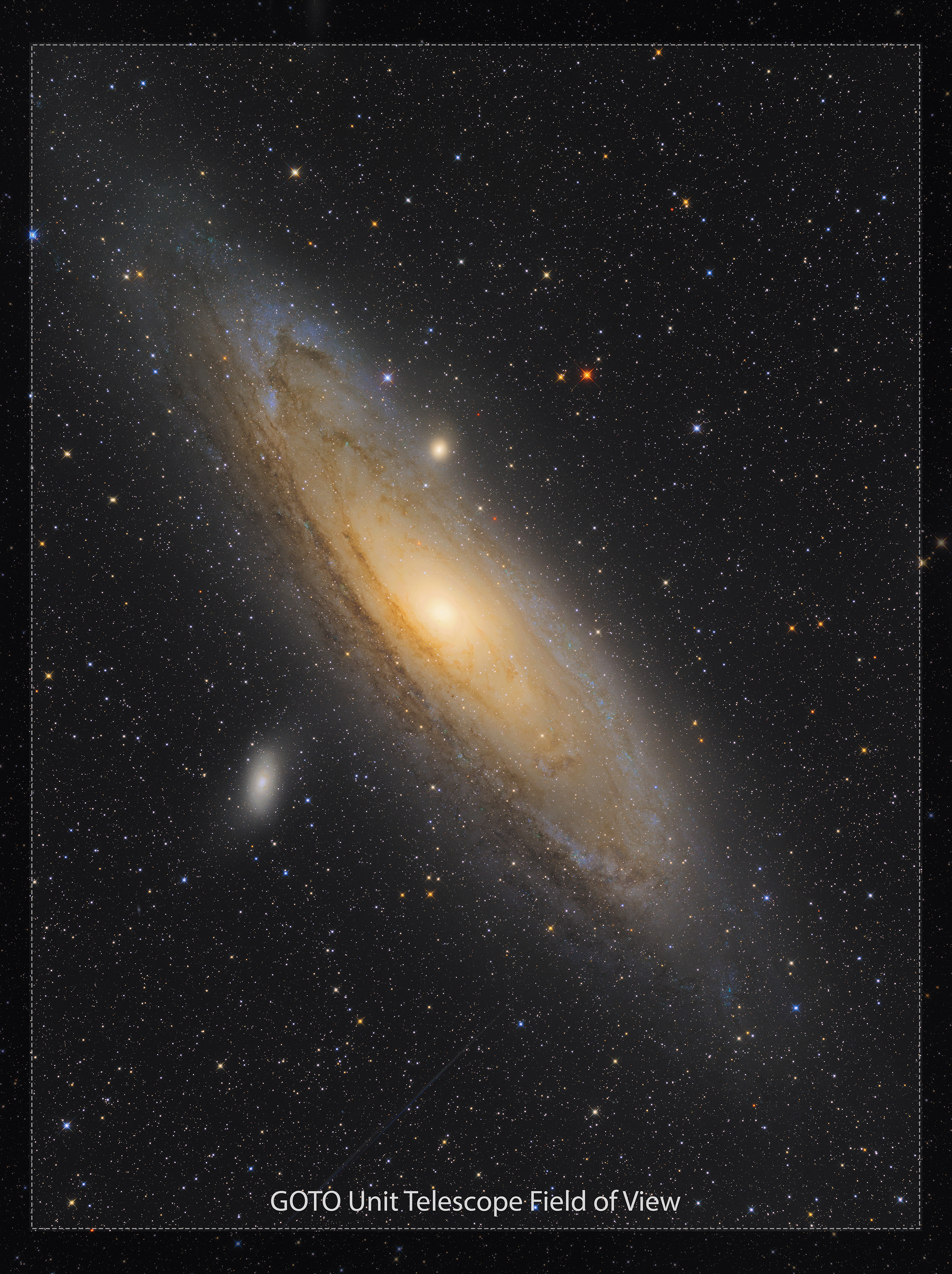
The Andromeda Galaxy, with an overlay showing the field of view of a single GOTO unit telescope.

Relative positions of each unit telescope in a single GOTO system.

The UTs are ASA H400 Newtonian telescopes, each with an aperture of 400mm and a focal length of 960mm (f/2.4). Attached to each telescope is a focuser, filter wheel, and a Finger Lakes Instrumentation (FLI) ML50100 camera, based on the Onsemi KAF-50100 CCD sensor. The fast focal ratio of f/2.4 and large image sensor result in a relatively large field of view, with each GOTO system having a total FoV of approximately 40 square degrees, around 200x the area of the full Moon in the sky. The fast focal ratio also means that only a small amount of time is needed to observe each area of the sky before the readout noise of the detectors becomes negligible, with each visit requiring only 3 minutes of exposure time.

=== Identifying transients ===
GOTO utilises difference imaging to identify changes of existing objects and the appearance of new objects (known as astronomical transients). Images of the sky are matched to previous observations of the same region, finding the difference between these two images will show only the changes in the new image. Sources within these difference images can then be detected automatically. Using difference imaging in this way produces many thousands of candidate sources per image, the vast majority of which are artefacts of the processing and not real transients. GOTO utilises a convolutional neural network based 'real-bogus' classifier to identify which sources are likely to be real.

=== Gamma-ray bursts ===
In addition to follow-up of gravitational wave events, GOTO can respond to detections of gamma-ray bursts (GRBs). On September 11, 2023, the Fermi Gamma-ray Space Telescope detected a gamma ray burst (GRB 230911A) and follow-up observations by GOTO discovered an optical counterpart (GOTO23akf/AT 2023shv), which was later confirmed as a GRB afterglow by the Swift X-ray telescope.

In 2024, GOTO discovered the optical counterpart of seven gamma-ray bursts, which were the subject of continued observations by both GOTO and other telescopes, including the Very Large Telescope and Gran Telescopio Canarias.

=== All-sky survey ===
Locations of GOTO-N and GOTO-S.

GOTO's typical mode of operation when not performing a follow-up campaign is to survey the entire visible sky. As there are sites located in both the northern and southern hemispheres, the visible sky for GOTO is all areas which are visible at night from anywhere on the Earth. If both sites have good weather conditions the entire visible sky can be observed every 2–3 days.

These observations are processed using difference imaging which allows for serendipitous discovery of transients unrelated to multi-messenger events, like supernovae, tidal disruption events, and fast blue optical transients.

== History ==
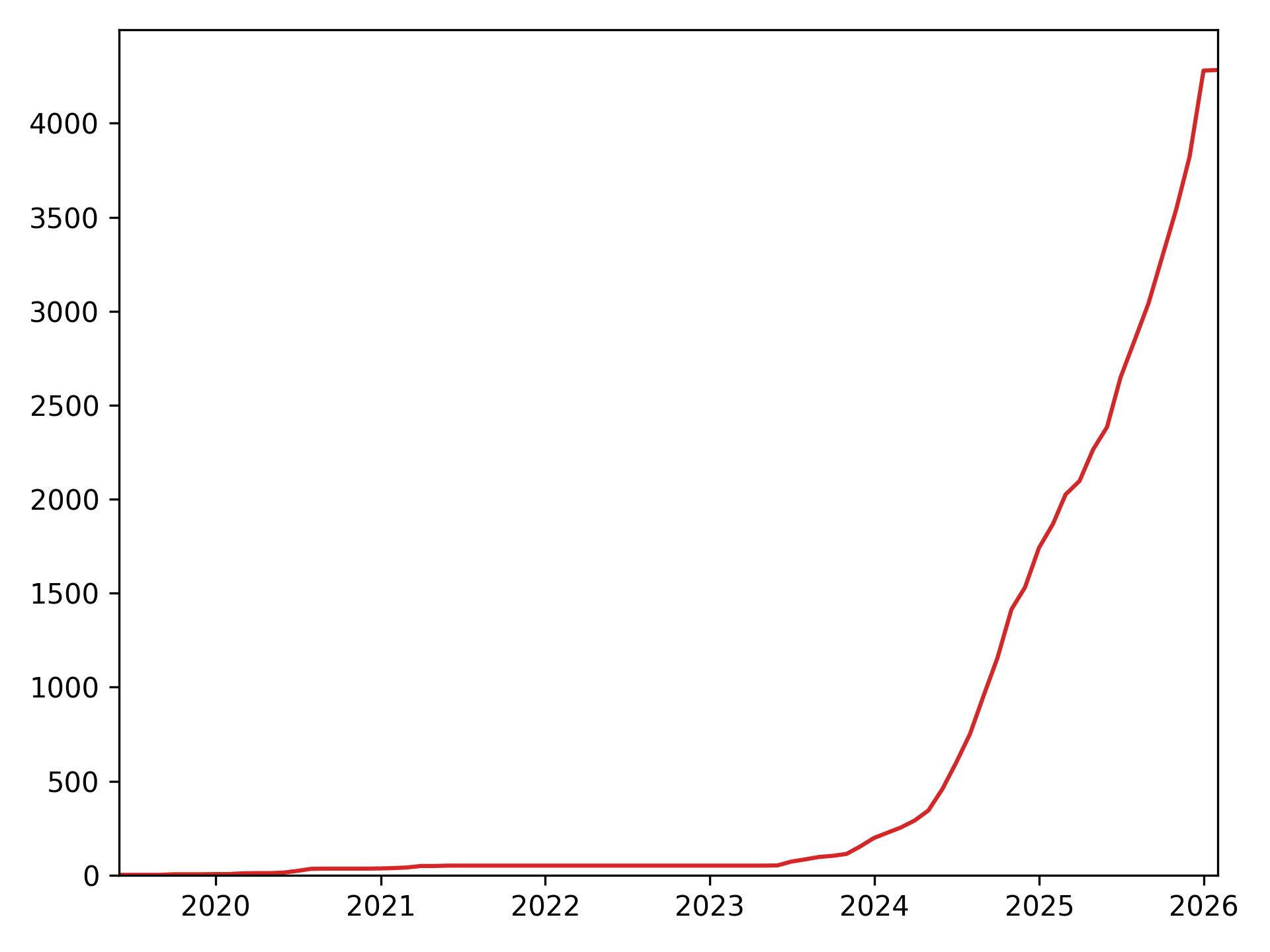
Total

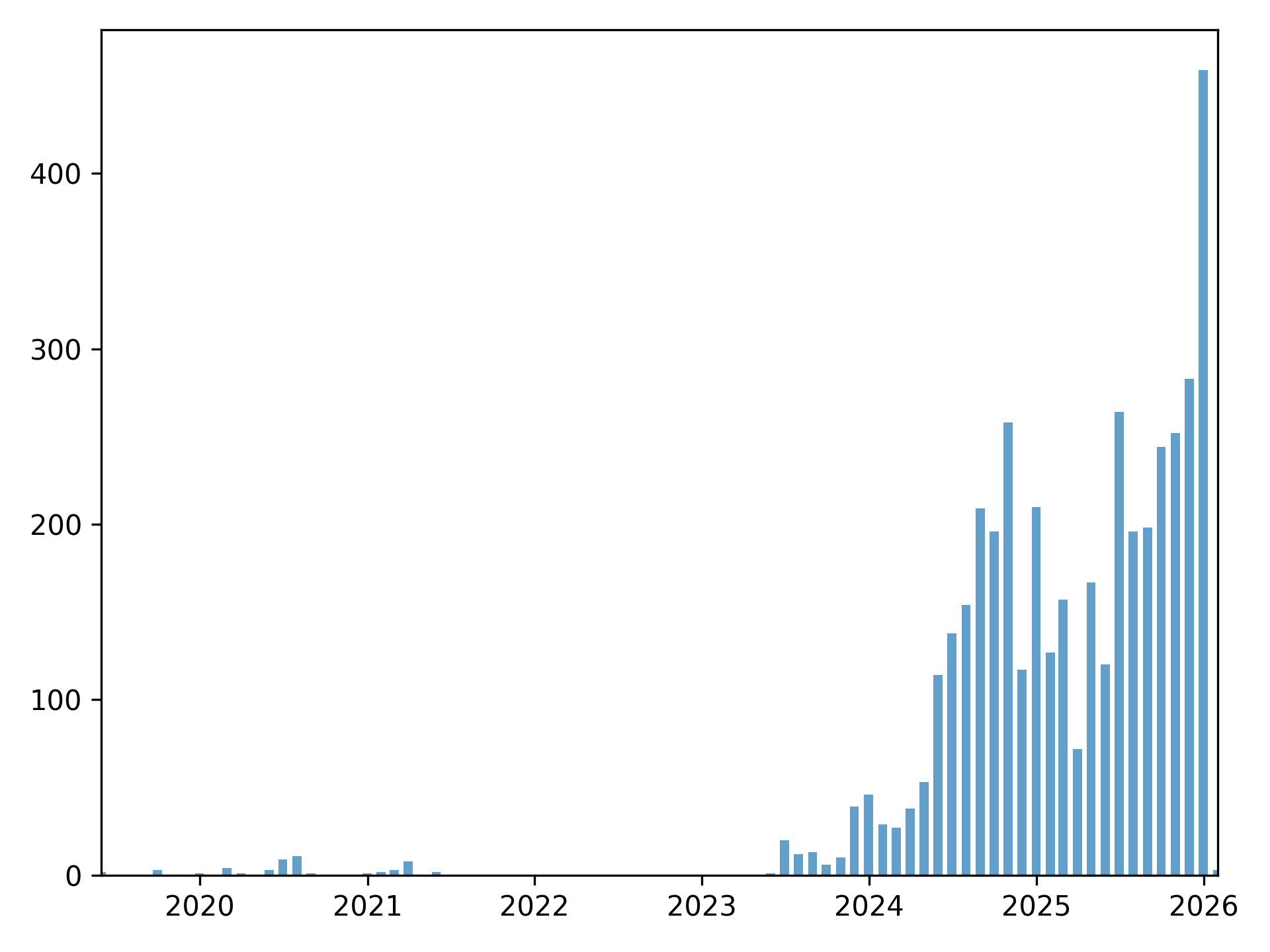
Monthly

Total (line) and monthly (bar) count of transients discovered by GOTO between 2020 and January 7 2026.

The first phase of GOTO's development was the deployment of a prototype system located at the planned site of the northern node, consisting of four unit telescopes on a custom-built mount. The prototype system was deployed during the second LIGO-Virgo Collaboration (LVC) observing run (O2), achieving first light in June 2017 with its official inauguration on July 3, 2017.

The prototype system was active during the first half of the third LVC observing run (O3a), which ran between April and October 2019. During this time GOTO was able to respond to gravitational-wave events and begin observing within one minute of alerts being received (if the source region was visible).

In late 2019 funding was awarded to expand the network with two full GOTO systems a duplicate site in Australia. In 2020 the first full system of the northern node was being deployed, with the second system planned for early 2021 and the Australian site planned for later that year.

The deployment of the second northern system was completed in August 2021 and, despite delays due to the 2021 volcanic eruption, the full northern node was completed in December 2021 with the upgrade of the prototype to the final hardware configuration.

By the end of 2022 the site for the second GOTO node (GOTO-S) had been prepared at Siding Spring Observatory (SSO) and the two domes installed. In May 2023 it was announced that both systems at SSO had been successfully installed.

== Discoveries ==
As of June 27, 2026, data from GOTO has been used in the discovery of 5,859 astronomical transients, of which 734 have been classified as supernovae and five as tidal disruption events.

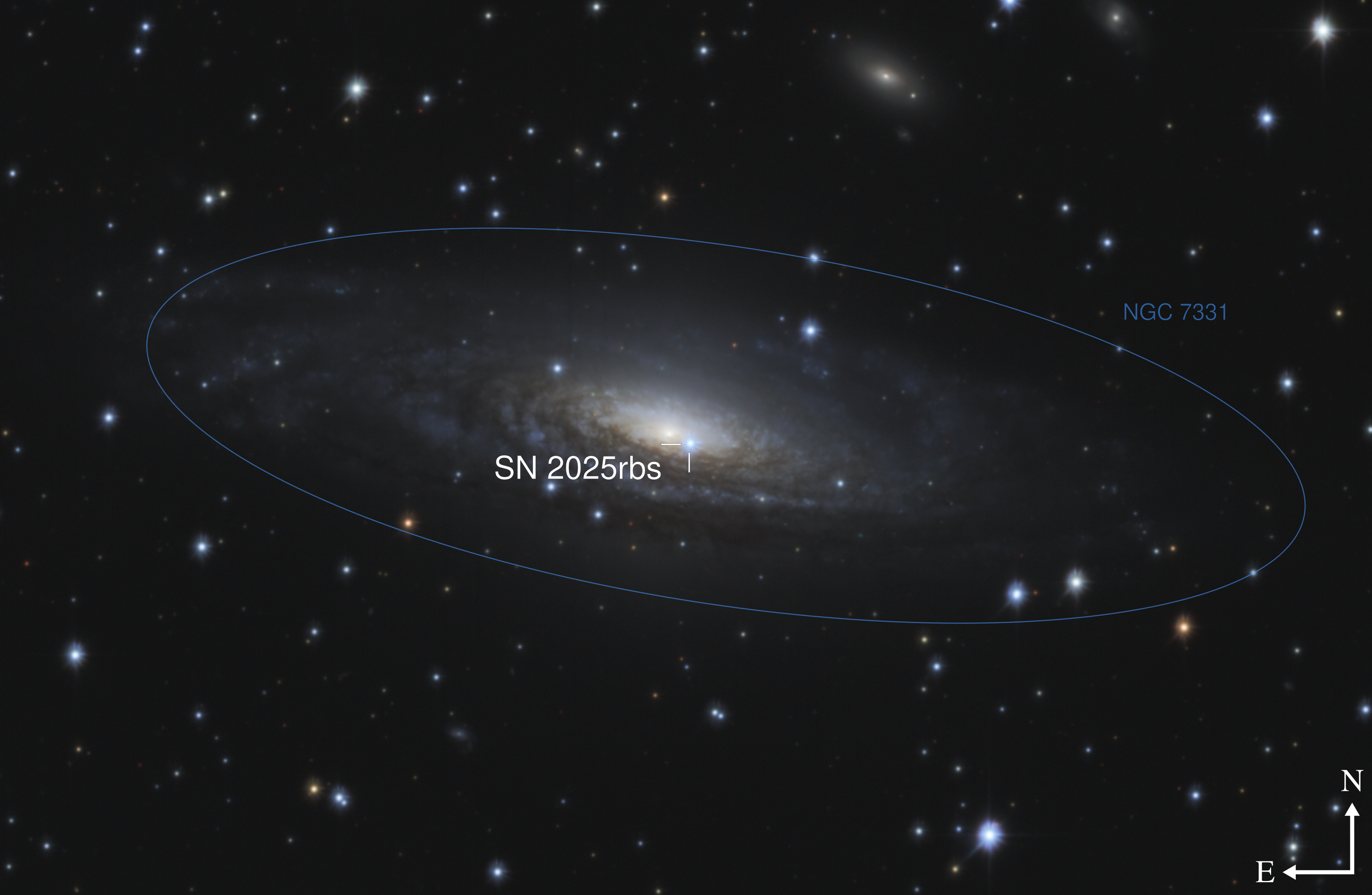
An image of SN 2025rbs, a Type Ia supernova discovered by GOTO

SN 2025rbs in the galaxy NGC 7331 was discovered by GOTO on July 14, 2025. Within a day of discovery it was classified based on its optical spectrum as a Type Ia supernova. Later that month it reached a peak brightness of around magnitude 12, easily visible in amateur telescopes.

=== The First Gravitationally Lensed Superluminous Supernova ===
SN 2025wny was discovered and reported by GOTO on September 1, 2025. It was quickly identified as a candidate gravitationally lensed supernova, where the gravitational effect of a massive object like a galaxy causes the light from the supernova to be bent and magnified.

Spectroscopic observations from the Nordic Optical Telescope and W. M. Keck Observatory confirmed that the light from 2025wny was being gravitationally lensed and also showed it was a superluminous supernova (SLSN), making it the first example of a gravitationally lensed SLSN. Images taken later that month by the Liverpool Telescope showed multiple images of the supernova in an Einstein Cross pattern.

=== Superluminous Supernova Driven by a Magnetar ===
In late 2024, the supernova SN 2024afav was discovered by GOTO and classified as a superluminous supernova. Observations of 2024afav by the Las Cumbres Observatory network showed it varied in brightness, with bumps in its light curve. In 2026, a paper was published in the journal Nature, showing that the way in which the period of these bumps changed over time could be explained by a newly formed magnetar, a highly magnetic neutron star, providing energy to power the supernova.

== Kilonova Seekers ==
Kilonova Seekers is a citizen science project on the Zooniverse platform designed to assist GOTO in identifying real astrophysical transients. Volunteers are shown transient detections from GOTO, alongside a reference GOTO observation and the difference between the two, and asked whether they believe it to be a real detection. If a source reaches an 80% consensus, and has at least 8 votes, an alert is sent to the GOTO team for further investigation.

As of June 27, 2026, there have been over 5 million classifications made via Kilonova Seekers by over 4400 volunteers. In total over 435,000 possible sources have been completed as either real or bogus.

== See also ==
- All Sky Automated Survey for SuperNovae (ASAS-SN)
- Asteroid Terrestrial-impact Last Alert System (ATLAS)
- BlackGEM
- Pan-STARRS
- Vera C. Rubin Observatory
- Zwicky Transient Facility (ZTF)
