= NGC 3166 =

Galaxy in the constellation Sextans

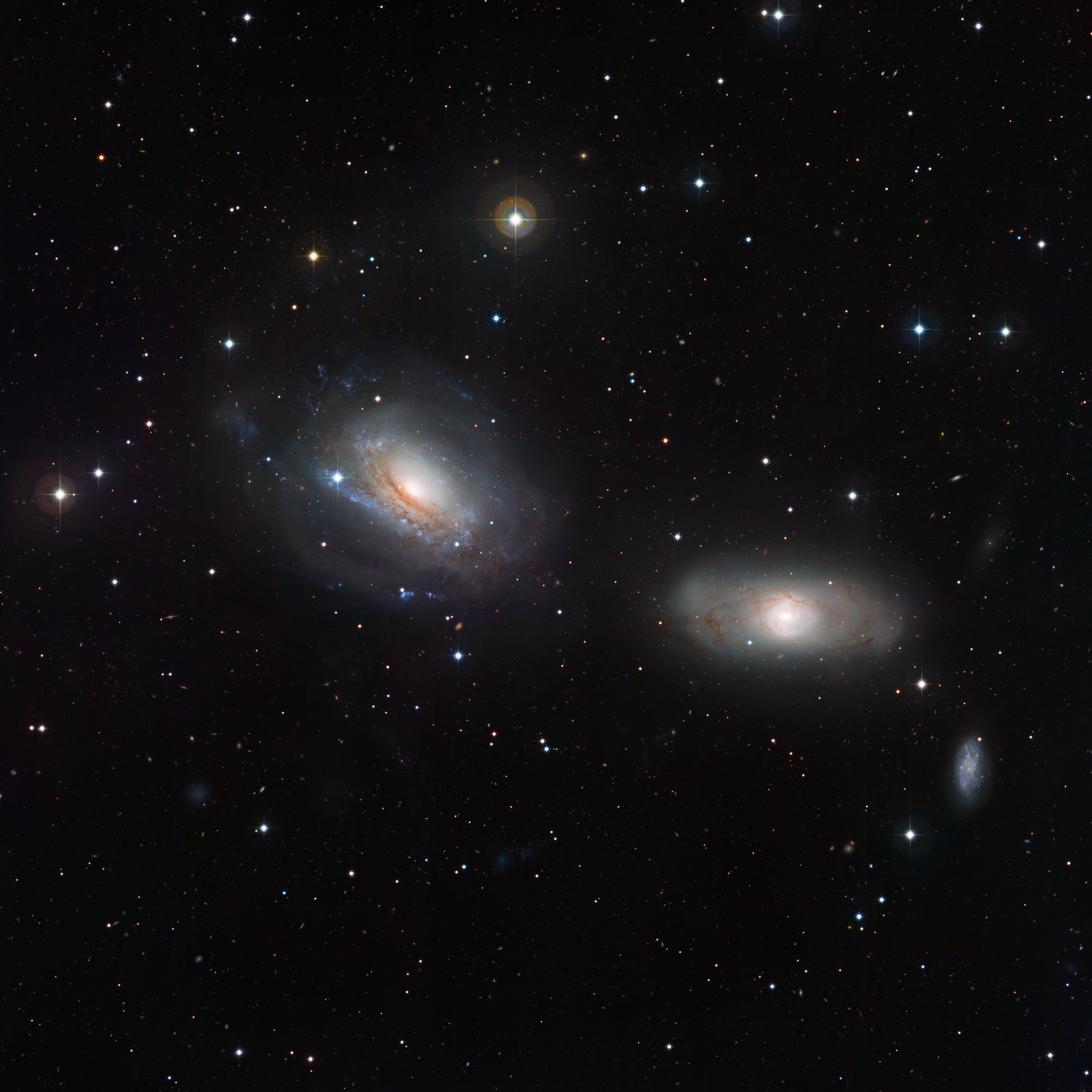
- NGC 3166 (right) with NGC 3169 (left) imaged by La Silla Observatory

Observation data (J2000 epoch)
- Constellation: Sextans
- Right ascension: 10^{h} 13^{m} 45.6784^{s}
- Declination: +03° 25′ 29.294″
- Redshift: 0.003946±0.000005
- Heliocentric radial velocity: 1,183±1 km/s
- Distance: 61.3 to 71.7 Mly (18.8 to 22.0 Mpc)
- Group or cluster: NGC 3166 Group
- Apparent magnitude (V): 10.5

Characteristics
- Type: SAB(rs)0/a
- Size: ~107,900 ly (33.09 kpc) (estimated)
- Apparent size (V): 4.8′ × 2.3′
- Notable features: Interacting with NGC 3169

Other designations
- HOLM 173A, IRAS 10111+0340, UGC 5516, MCG +01-26-024, PGC 29814, CGCG 036-064

NGC 3166 is a lenticular galaxy in the constellation Sextans. The galaxy lies about 65 million light years away from Earth, which means, given its apparent dimensions, that NGC 3166 is approximately 105,000 light years across. It was discovered by William Herschel on December 19, 1783.

== Characteristics ==
NGC 3166 has a bright, elongated nucleus, surrounded by an elliptical bright bulge, elongated along a nearly east-west axis. In the central 6-7 arcseconds there is evidence of a circumnuclear star disk. The age of the stars in the nucleus is estimated to be no older than two billion years. A low-surface-brightness bar is visible lying nearly perpendicular to that. The fainter parts of the bulge are nearly circular, about one arcminute in diameter, and with spiral whorls. Beyond that lies a low-surface-brightness disk, without spiral arms or knots. Dust lanes are visible over the disk of the galaxy. The stars in the disk have sub-solar metallicity, indicating the stars are more than 8 billion years old there.

In ultraviolet the galaxy is asymmetric, with stronger emission west of the nucleus. That region, at the western tidal arm, is the only in the galaxy that has a spectrum similar to an HII region and is indicative of the presence of young stars. There is hydrogen emission east of the nucleus. This asymmetry could be the result of recent gas accretion, and a complete star formation ring hasn't yet formed. The current star formation rate of the galaxy is estimated to be 0.06±0.01 M_{☉} per year. An arm is visible in H-alpha 100 arcseconds west of the nucleus. The outer regions of the galaxy appear lopsided.

== Supernova ==
One supernova has been detected in NGC 3166. SN 2012cw (Type Ic, mag. 16.5) was discovered by Kōichi Itagaki on 14 June 2012. Its progenitor couldn't be detected in archive images by Hubble Space Telescope, indicating it had an absolute magnitude of less than -7.

== Nearby galaxies ==
NGC 3166 forms an interacting pair with NGC 3169, which lies at a separation of 7.5 arcminutes. Another companion galaxy, NGC 3165, lies 4.5 arcminutes to the southwest. A tidal tail connecting NGC 3166 with NGC 3169 extending south of the galaxy is visible in radiowaves, in the hydrogen line. The total mass of hydrogen in the tail is estimated to be 10^{8} M_{☉}. At the end of the tail a tidal dwarf galaxy, AGC 208457, has formed. Some other gas clumps have also been detected. Three of them are classical dwarf irregular galaxies. There is extended hydrogen emission surrounding the group. These galaxies, along with NGC 3156, form the NGC 3169 Group, which is part of the Leo II Groups, a large cloud of galaxies in the Virgo Supercluster.
