= NGC 470 =

Spiral galaxy in the constellation Pisces

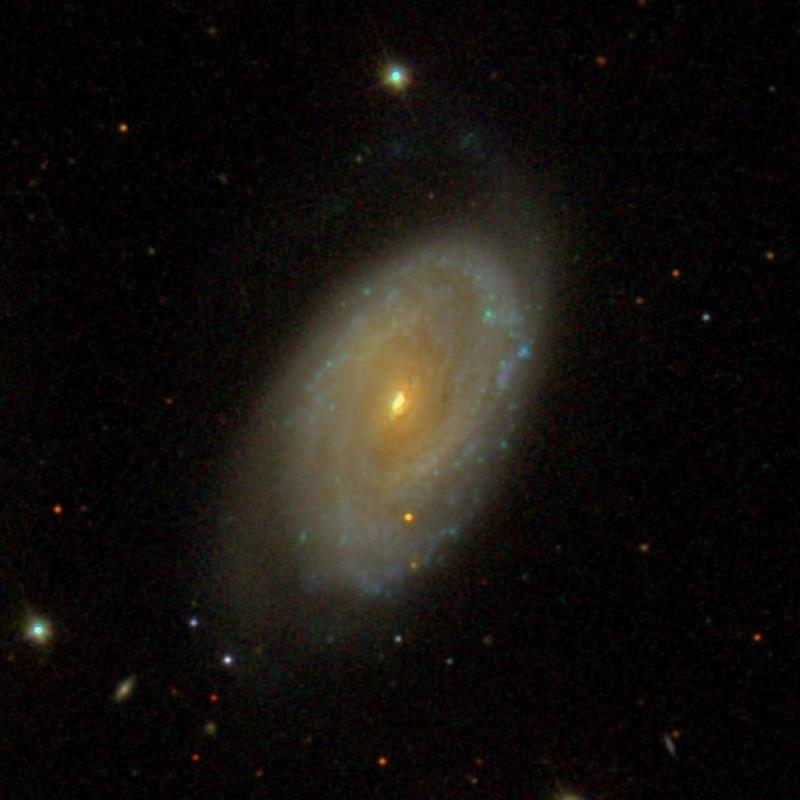
- SDSS image of NGC 470

Observation data (J2000 epoch)
- Constellation: Pisces
- Right ascension: 01^{h} 19^{m} 44.845^{s}
- Declination: +03° 24′ 35.90″
- Redshift: 0.008659
- Heliocentric radial velocity: 2585 km/s
- Distance: 110 Mly (34 Mpc)
- Apparent magnitude (V): 11.78
- Apparent magnitude (B): 12.53

Characteristics
- Type: SA(rs)b
- Apparent size (V): 2.8′ × 1.7′

Other designations
- UGC 858, MCG +00-04-084, PGC 4777

NGC 470 is a spiral galaxy in the constellation Pisces. Located approximately 91 million lightyears from Earth, it was discovered by Friedrich Wilhelm Herschel in 1784. The galaxy also weakly interacts with NGC 474.

It is part of a galaxy group known as LGG 20. It has at least 3 members, which are NGC 474, NGC 520 and UGC 957.

== Gallery ==
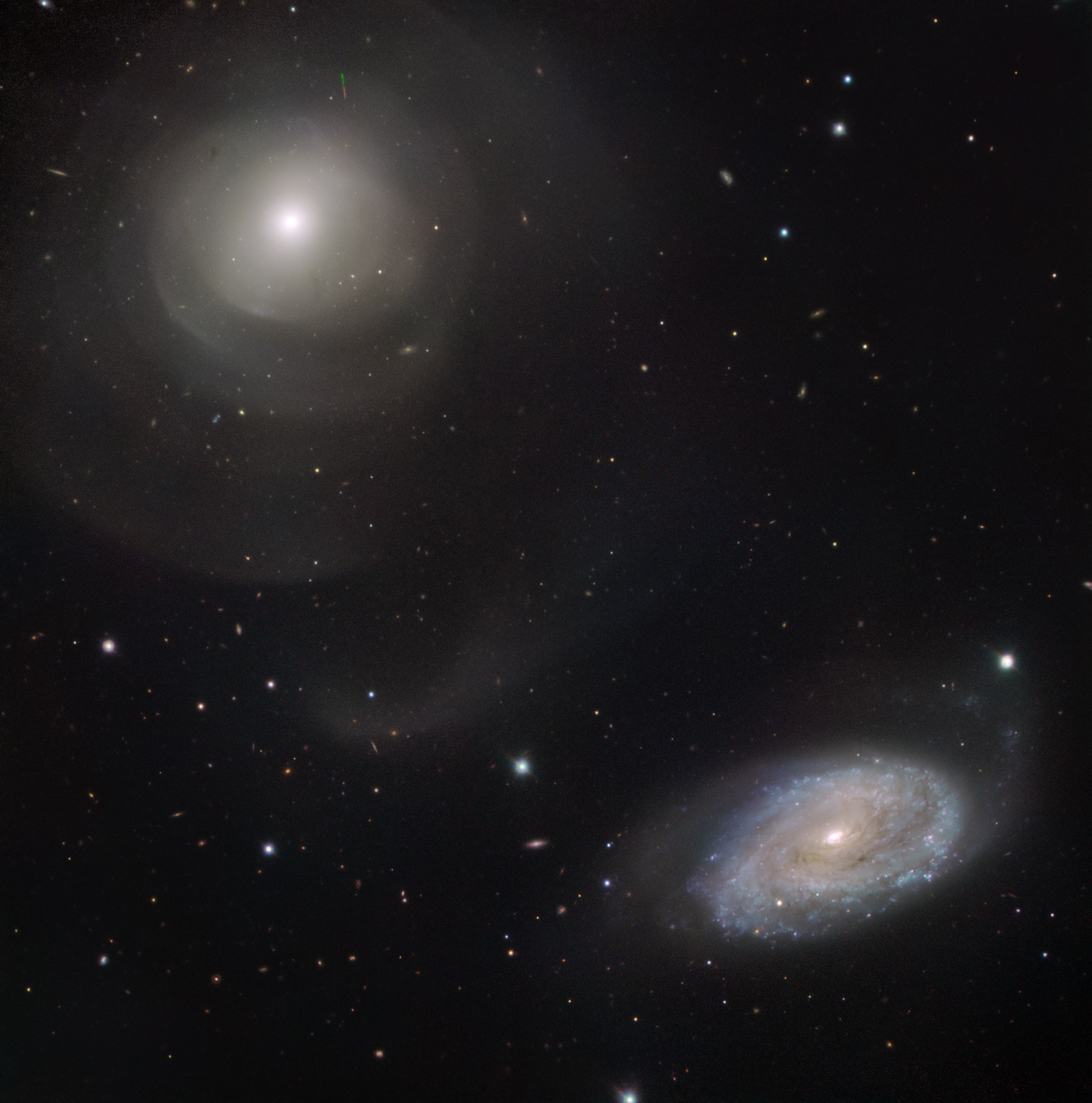
NGC 470 with neighbor NGC 474.

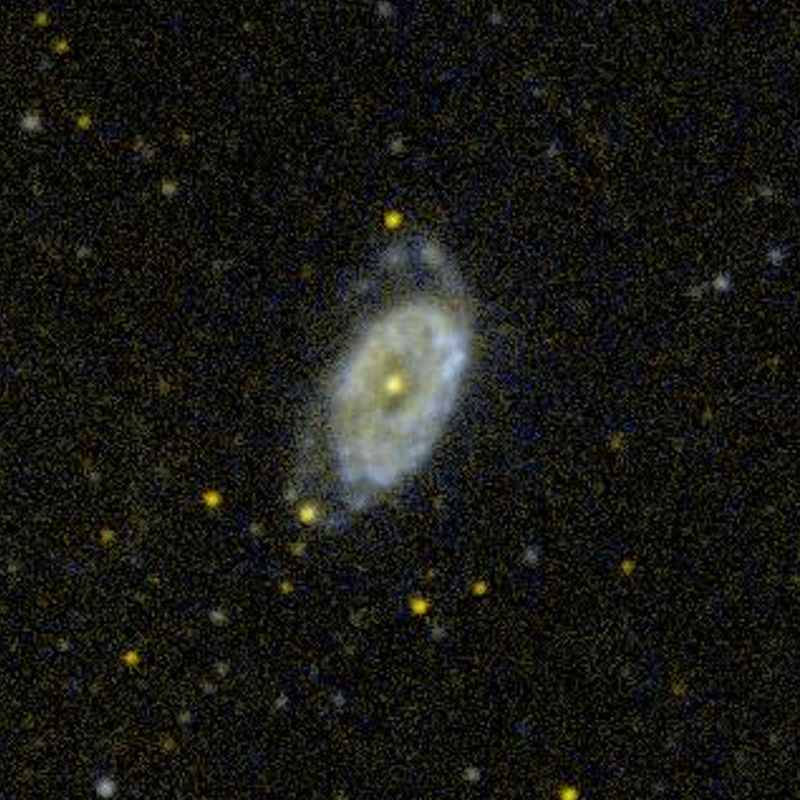
NGC 470 by GALEX

== See also ==
- List of galaxies
- List of spiral galaxies
