= NGC 474 =

Galaxy in the constellation Pisces

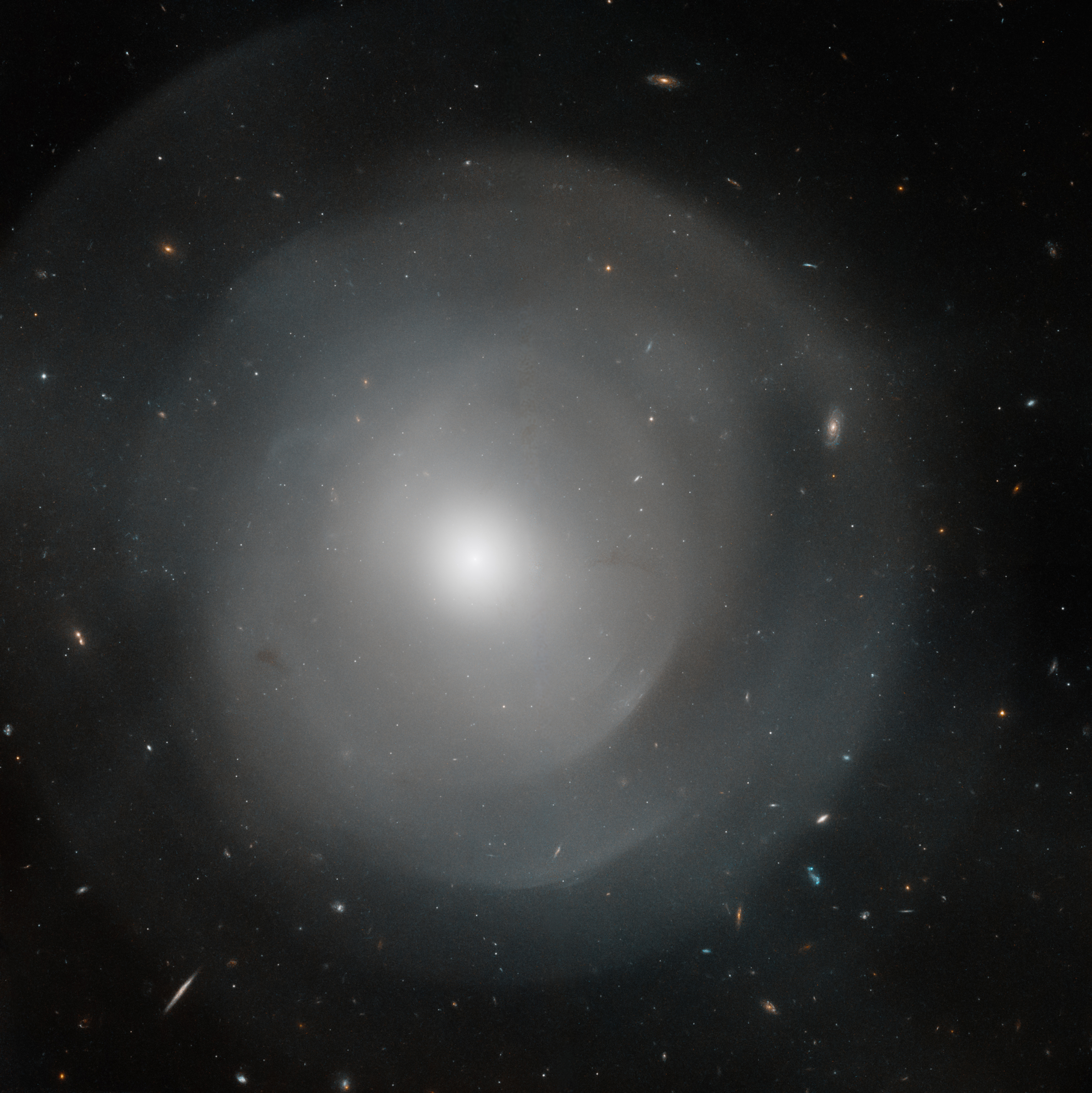
- NGC 474 imaged by the Hubble Space Telescope

Observation data (J2000 epoch)
- Constellation: Pisces
- Right ascension: 01^{h} 20^{m} 06.6862^{s}
- Declination: +03° 24′ 55.809″
- Redshift: 0.007722
- Heliocentric radial velocity: 2315 km/s ±5 km/s
- Galactocentric velocity: 2398 km/s ±7 km/s
- Distance: ~100 Mly (~31 Mpc)
- Apparent magnitude (V): 12.37

Characteristics
- Type: S0
- Size: 250,000 ly (diameter)
- Apparent size (V): 7.1′ × 6.3′

Other designations
- ZWG 385.71, 2MASX J01200669+0324549, Arp 227, UGC 864, MCG +00-04-085, PGC 4801, CGCG 385-071

NGC 474 is a large lenticular galaxy in the constellation Pisces. Its velocity with respect to the cosmic microwave background is 2,001±23 km/s, which corresponds to a Hubble distance of 96.2 ± 6.8 Mly (29.51 ± 2.09 Mpc). Additionally, 13 non-redshift measurements give a similar mean distance of 91.50 ± 6.69 Mly (28.054 ± 2.050 Mpc). It was discovered by German-British astronomer William Herschel on 13 December 1784.

NGC 474 is known to possess tidal shells and tidal tails, although their origins remain unclear. One possible explanation is that NGC 474 interacted with a galaxy several billion years ago.

== Structure ==
The origins of the spectacular tidal features around NGC 474 have been extensively studied, and some possible explanations have been published. The authors of one study argued that the tidal tails were formed because of a collision with a galaxy 2 billion years ago. The same study also stated that NGC 474 is absorbing gas from its neighbor, NGC 470, since the ancient collision. In another model, the tidal shells can be explained by a gas-rich spiral galaxy colliding with NGC 474 twice, before finally merging. NGC 474 is moving away from the Sun at a rate of 2412 km/s due to dark energy.

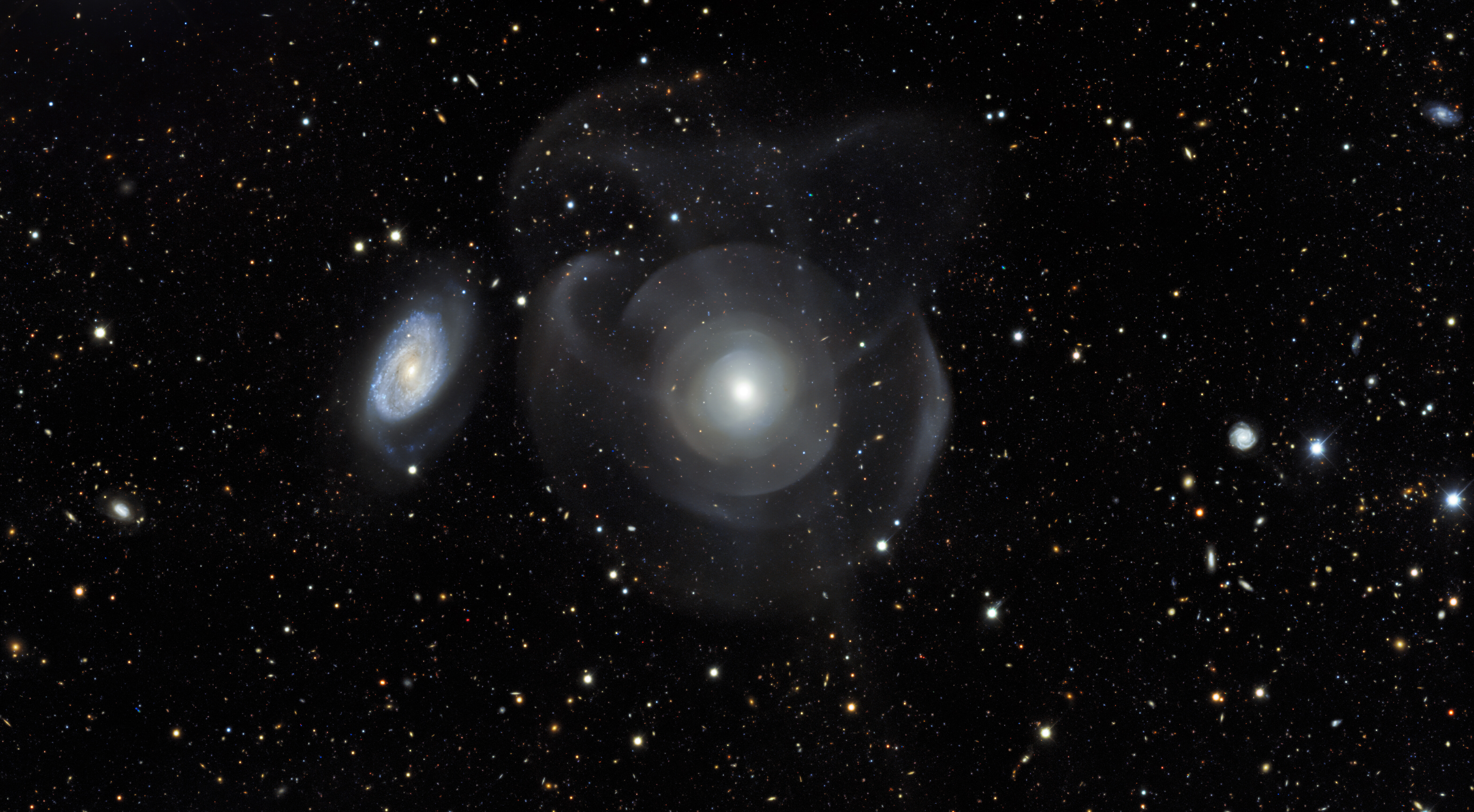
NGC 474's (right) tidal tails and shell-like structures may be from collision(s) with another galaxy. A neighboring spiral galaxy, NGC 470, is on the left.

== Supernova ==
One supernova has been observed in NGC 474: SN 2017fgc (Type Ia, mag. 17.3239) was discovered by the Distance Less Than 40 Mpc Survey (DLT40) on 11 July 2017. It was located at a considerable distance (~18.90±0.01 kpc) from the galactic nucleus.

== NGC 470 Group ==
It is part of a galaxy group known as NGC 470 Group or LGG 20. It has at least 3 members, which are NGC 470, NGC 520 and UGC 957.

== See also ==
- List of NGC objects (1–1000)
