= NGC 2937 =

Elliptical galaxy in the constellation Hydra

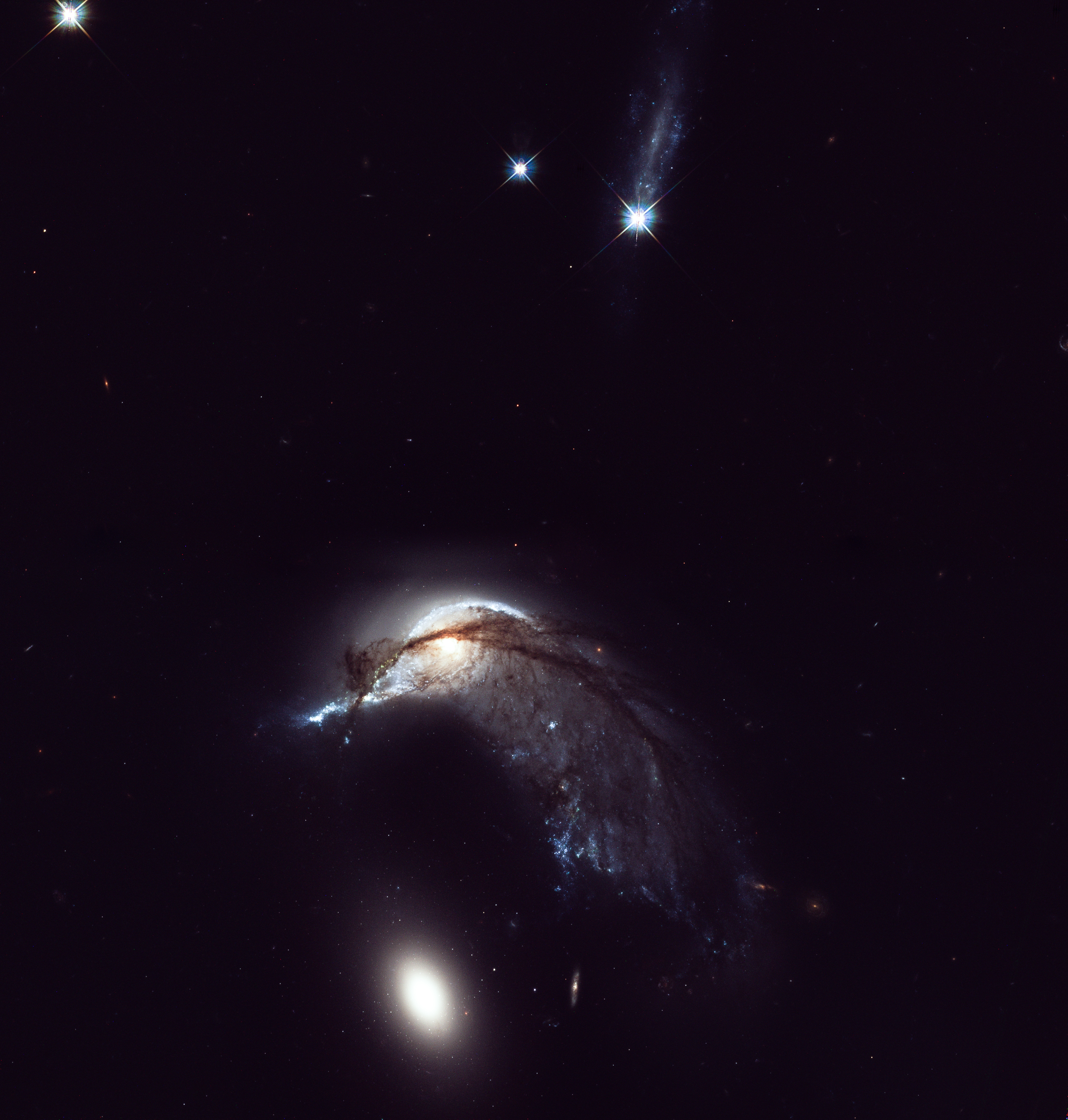
- NGC 2937 (bottom) and NGC 2936 (center)

Observation data (J2000 epoch)
- Constellation: Hydra
- Right ascension: 09^{h} 37^{m} 45^{s}
- Declination: +02° 44′ 50″
- Distance: ~343 million ly
- Apparent magnitude (V): 13.66
- Apparent magnitude (B): 14.6
- Surface brightness: 22.84 mag/arcsec^{2}

Characteristics
- Type: E3

Other designations
- ARP 142, PGC 27423, UGC 5131, MCG 1-25-6, CGCG 35-15, VV 316, NPM1G +02.0225

NGC 2937 is an elliptical galaxy located in the constellation Hydra. Its velocity relative to the cosmic microwave background is ~ 6,713 km/s, which corresponds to a Hubble distance of 105.1 ± 7.4 Mpc (~343 million ly). NGC 2937 was discovered by German astronomer Albert Marth in 1864.

NGC 2937 is in a strong gravitational interaction with its neighbor NGC 2936, a peculiar spiral galaxy. This interaction has given the latter an appearance that is far from that of a spiral galaxy. The shape of NGC 2936 has earned it the nickname of the "porpoise galaxy".

Together, these two galaxies appear in Halton Arp's Atlas of Peculiar Galaxies under the code Arp 142. Halton Arp uses them as an example from an elliptical galaxy. This pair of galaxies also appears in the Catalog of Collisional Ring Galaxies by Madore, Nelson and Petrillo.

== Image gallery ==
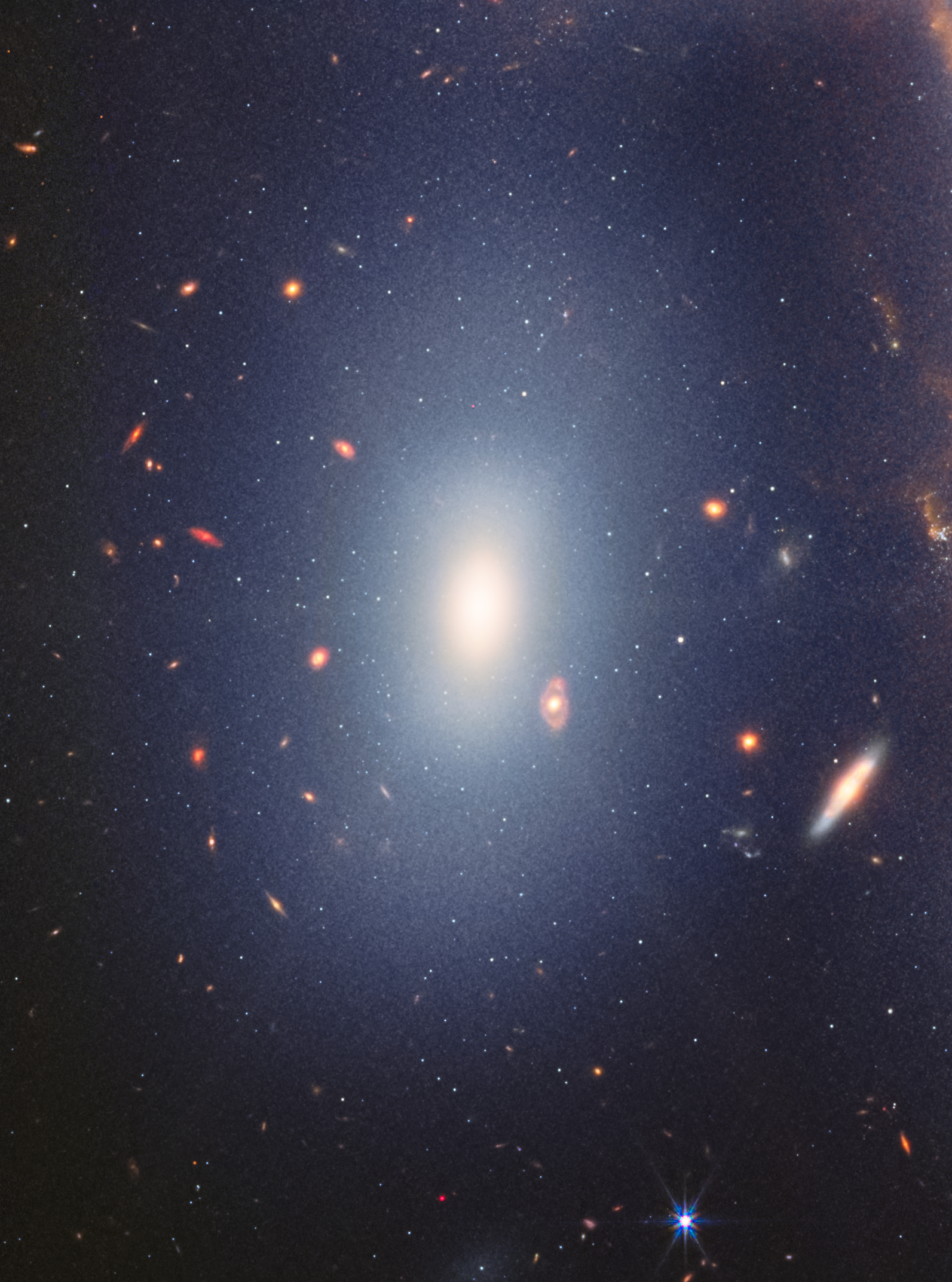
James Webb Space Telescope image of NGC 2937.

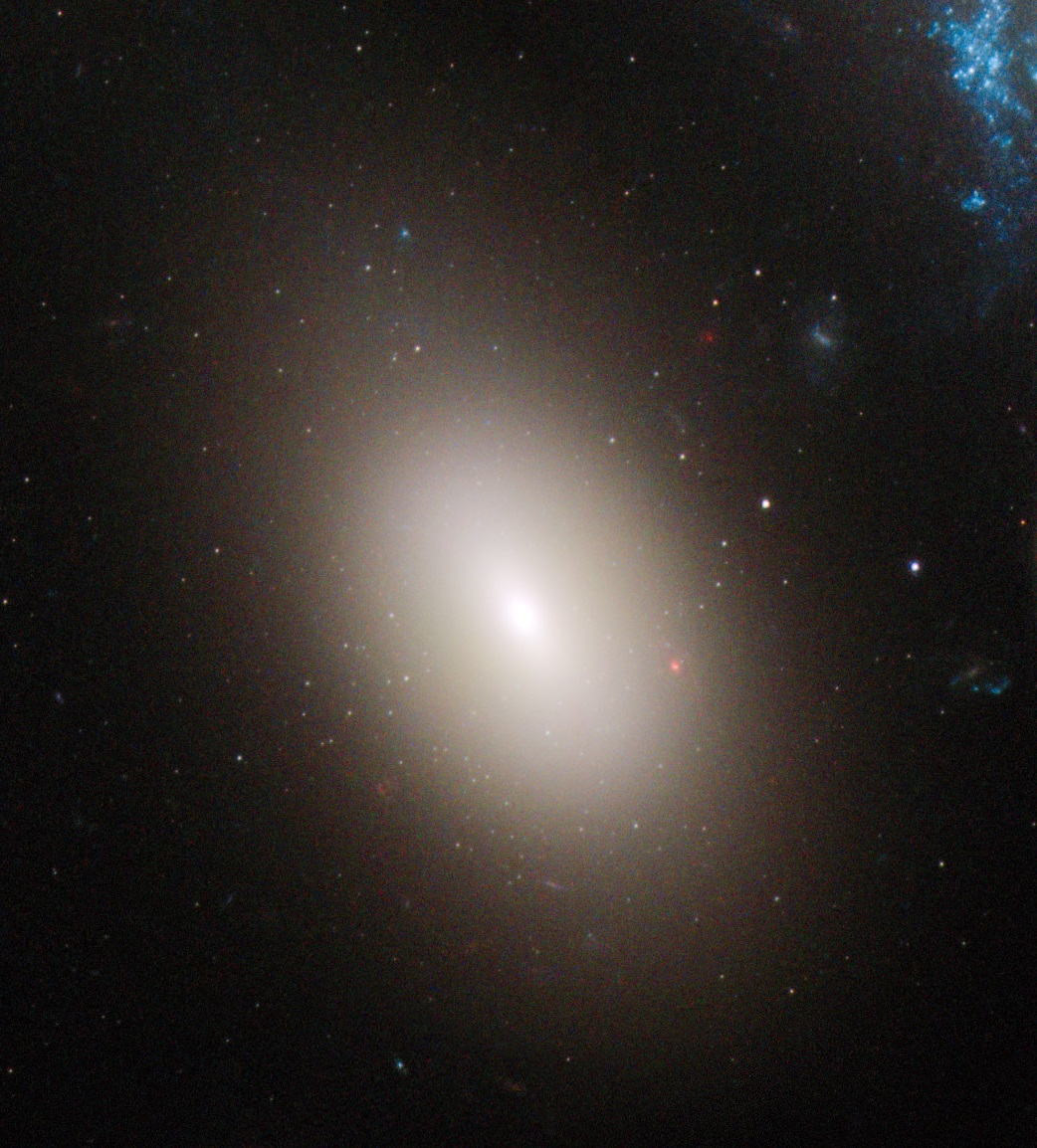
Hubble Space Telescope image of NGC 2937.

== See also ==
- List of NGC objects (2001–3000)

== Sources ==
- Tully, R. Brent (2015-04-28). "Galaxy Groups: A 2MASS Catalog". The Astronomical Journal. 149 (5): 171. arXiv:1503.03134. Bibcode:2015AJ....149..171T. doi:10.1088/0004-6256/149/5/171. ISSN 1538-3881.
- Gil de Paz, Armando; Boissier, Samuel; Madore, Barry F.; Seibert, Mark; Joe, Young H.; Boselli, Alessandro; Wyder, Ted K.; Thilker, David; Bianchi, Luciana; Rey, Soo-Chang; Rich, R. Michael; Barlow, Tom A.; Conrow, Tim; Forster, Karl; Friedman, Peter G.; Martin, D. Christopher; Morrissey, Patrick; Neff, Susan G.; Schiminovich, David; Small, Todd; Donas, Jose; Heckman, Timothy M.; Lee, Young-Wook; Milliard, Bruno; Szalay, Alex S.; Yi, Sukyoung (2007). "The GALEX Ultraviolet Atlas of Nearby Galaxies". The Astrophysical Journal Supplement Series. 173 (2): 185–255. arXiv:astro-ph/0606440. Bibcode:2007ApJS..173..185G. doi:10.1086/516636. ISSN 0067-0049.
- Gottlieb S. (May 2017). "Galaxies in Collision". Sky & Telescope. 133 (5): 28–29. Bibcode:2017S&T...133e..28G. ISSN 0037-6604.
