= NGC 2936 =

Interacting spiral galaxy in the constellation Hydra

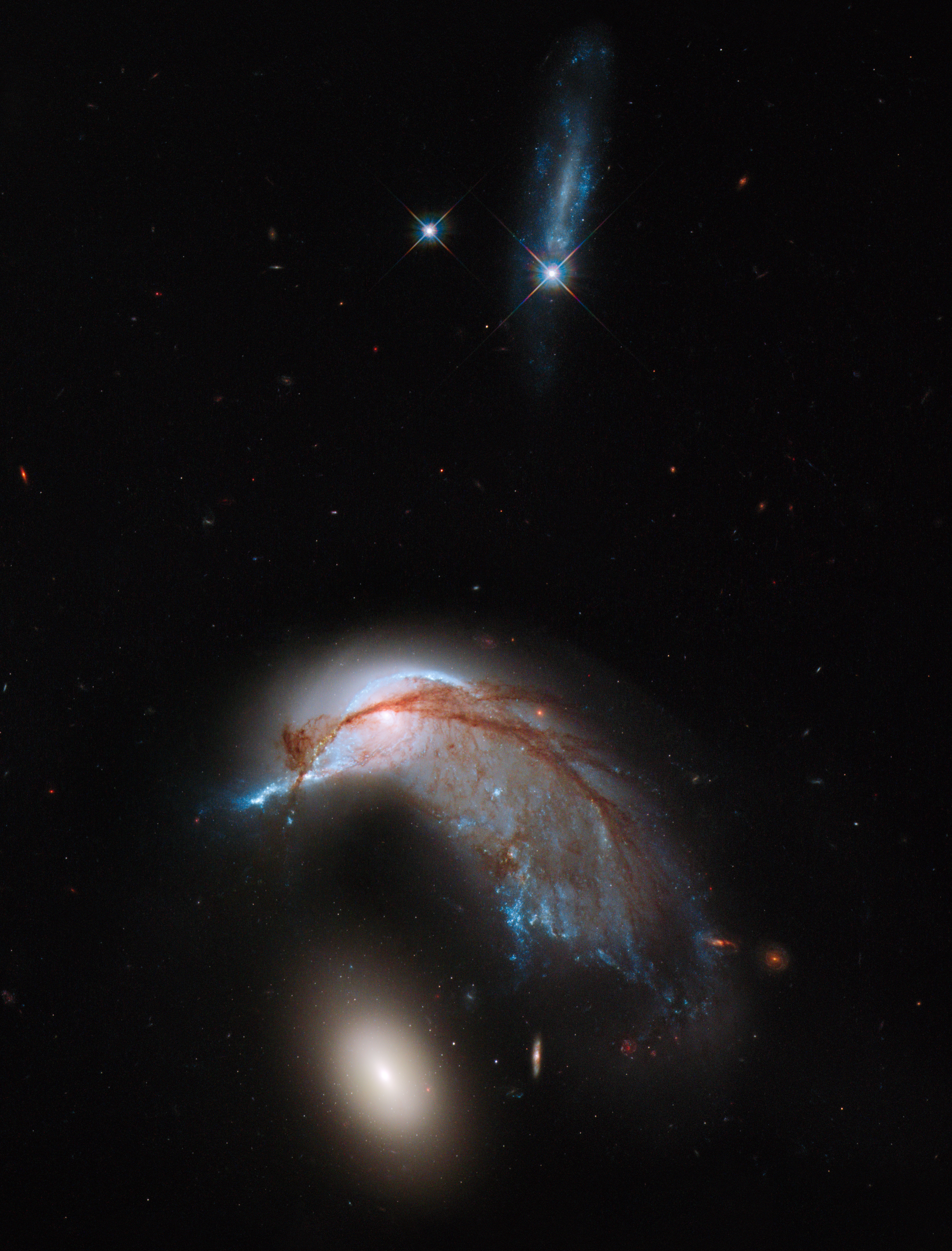
- PGC 1237172 (top), NGC 2936 (bottom middle), and NGC 2937 (bottom) by Hubble Space Telescope

Observation data (J2000 epoch)
- Constellation: Hydra
- Right ascension: 09^{h} 37^{m} 44.148^{s}
- Declination: +02° 45′ 38.95″
- Redshift: 0.02331±0.00013
- Heliocentric radial velocity: 6989±38 km/s
- Galactocentric velocity: 6844±39 km/s
- Distance: 352 Mly (108 Mpc)
- Apparent magnitude (V): 12.85
- Absolute magnitude (V): −22.4

Characteristics
- Type: Irr
- Size: 50.54 kpc

Other designations
- NGC 2936, UGC 5130, MCG +01-25-006, PGC 27422

NGC 2936, also known as the Penguin Galaxy or the Porpoise Galaxy, is an interacting spiral galaxy located at a distance of 326 million light years, in the constellation Hydra. NGC 2936 is interacting with elliptical galaxy NGC 2937, located just beneath it in the illustration. They were both discovered by Albert Marth on Mar 3, 1864. To some astronomers, the galaxy looks like a penguin or a porpoise. NGC 2936, NGC 2937, and PGC 1237172 are included in the Atlas of Peculiar Galaxies as Arp 142 in the category "Material emanating from elliptical galaxies".

On 20 June 2013, the Hubble Space Telescope examined and photographed NGC 2936.

NGC 2936 once had a flat, spiral disk. The orbits of the galaxy's stars have been perturbed due to gravitational tidal interactions with NGC 2937. Gas from the center of NGC 2936 became compressed during the encounter with NGC 2937, which is shown as blue knots close to NGC 2937. The red dust that was inside the center of the galaxy has been mostly thrown out due to the collision. During the collision, gas coming from NGC 2936 triggered star formation.

PGC 1237172, an unrelated bluish irregular galaxy or edge-on spiral galaxy, is located just off to the side of NGC 2936. It is located 230 million light years away, making it closer to the Earth than the NGC 2936 collision, and it happens to be located next to two unrelated stars from the Milky Way.

The brightest star in this galaxy is USNOA2 0900-06460021.

== See also ==
- List of NGC objects (2001–3000)
