= Interacting galaxy =

Galaxies with interacting gravitational fields

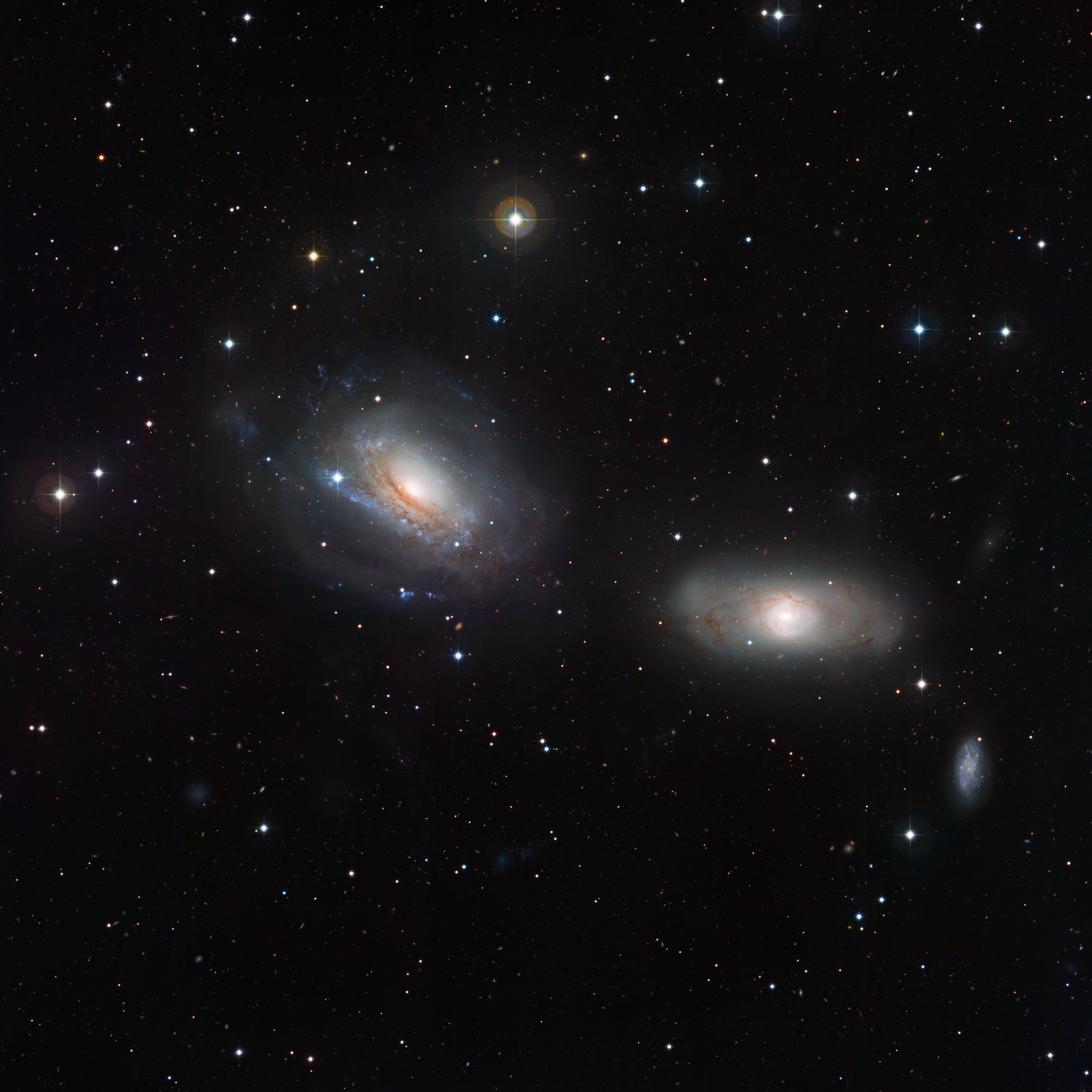
NGC 3169 (left) and NGC 3166 (right), located in the constellation Sextans display some curious features, showing that both galaxies are close enough to feel the distorting gravitational influence of the other. Image from the Wide Field Imager on the MPG/ESO 2.2-metre telescope at the La Silla Observatory.

Interacting galaxies, also known as colliding galaxies, are two or more galaxies whose gravitational fields result in a disturbance of one another. There are several types of galactic interactions, including major interactions, minor interactions, and galaxy harassment. Major interactions occur between galaxies with similar amounts of mass, whereas minor interactions involve galaxies with masses that vary significantly. An example of a minor interaction is a satellite galaxy disturbing the primary galaxy's spiral arms. An example of a major interaction is a galactic collision, such as the one that astronomers estimate will happen in the future between the Milky Way and Andromeda. Collisions may lead to galaxy mergers and may also lead to other phenomena such as star formation and black hole activity.

== Satellite interaction ==
A giant galaxy interacting with its satellites is common. A satellite's gravity could attract one of the primary's spiral arms. Alternatively, the secondary satellite can dive into the primary galaxy, as in the Sagittarius Dwarf Elliptical Galaxy diving into the Milky Way. That can possibly trigger a small amount of star formation. Such orphaned clusters of stars were sometimes referred to as "blue blobs" before they were recognized as stars.

Animation of Galaxy Collision

== Galaxy collision ==
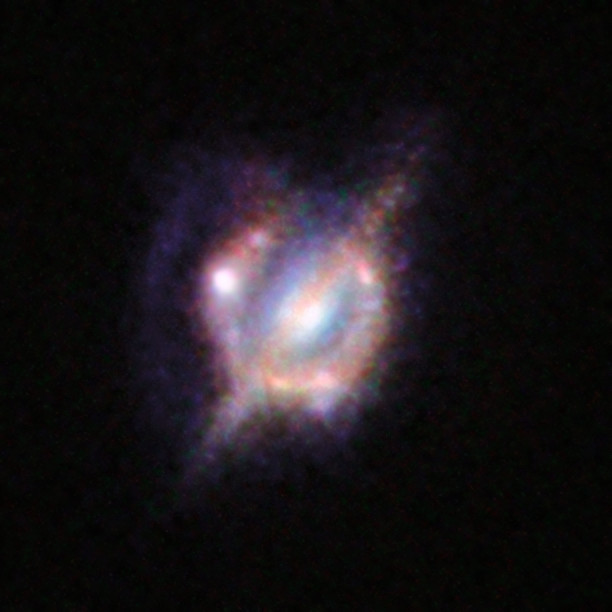
Gravitationally lensed galactic merger H-ATLAS J142935.3-002836.

Colliding galaxies are common during galaxy evolution. The extremely tenuous distribution of matter in galaxies means these are not collisions in the traditional sense of the word, but rather gravitational interactions. As a result, some galaxy features such as star formation, shape, and size are impacted by interactions with other galaxies.

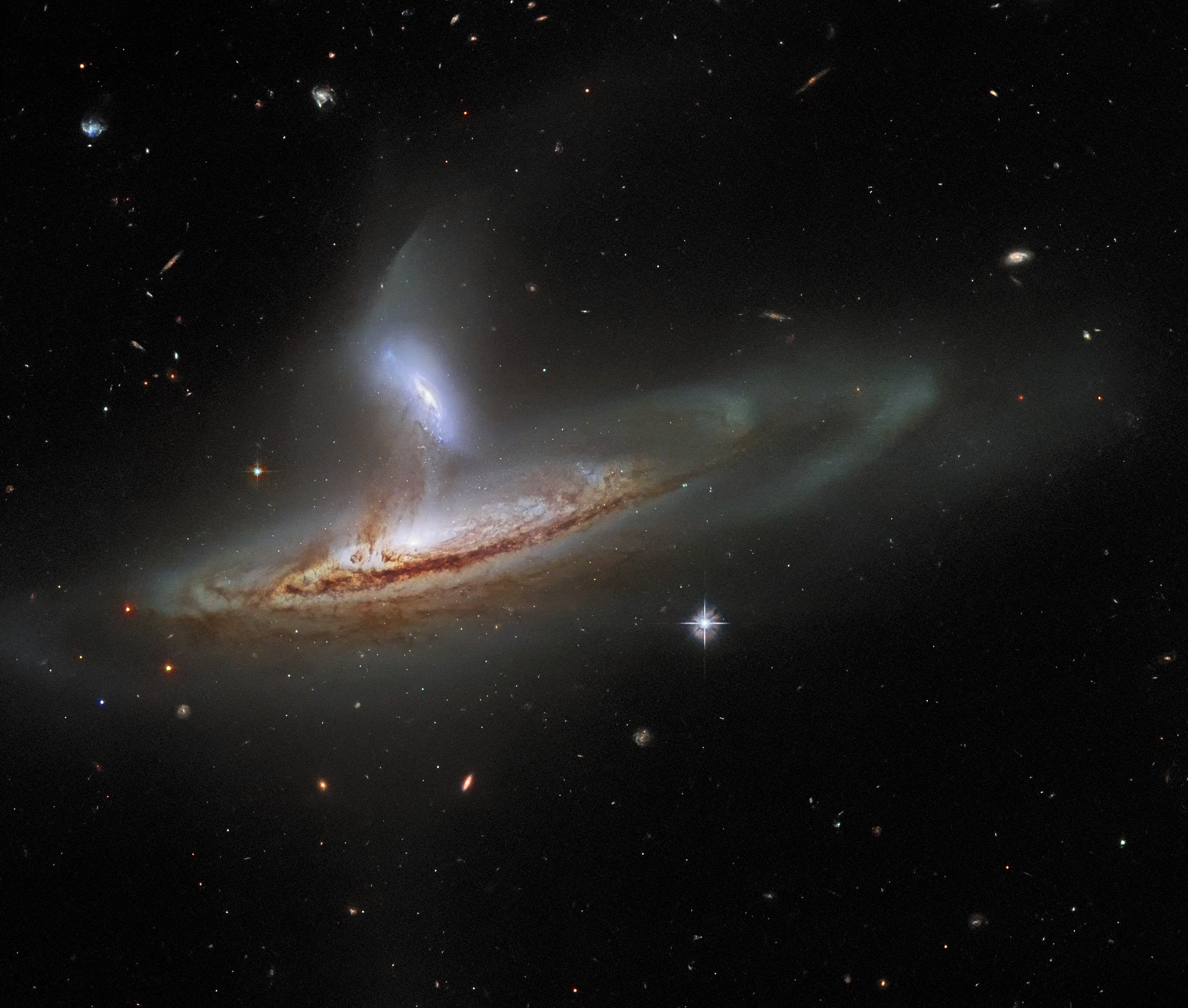
This image, captured by the NASA/ESA Hubble Space Telescope, shows two interacting galaxies, NGC 169 (bottom) and IC 1559 (top).

Colliding may lead to merging if two galaxies collide and do not have enough momentum to continue traveling after the collision. As with other galaxy collisions, the merging of two galaxies may create a starburst region of new stars. This starburst is an example of an increased star formation rate within the merged galaxies. A study conducted in 2024 shows that a key component in determining this change in star formation rate is the masses of the two galaxies involved. It suggests that if the two galaxies are of similar mass to begin with, this increase in star formation rate will be greater. When a starburst region is created, the galaxies fall back into each other and eventually merge into one galaxy after many passes through each other. If one of the colliding galaxies is much larger than the other, it will remain largely intact after the merger. The larger galaxy will look much the same, while the smaller galaxy will be stripped apart and become part of the larger galaxy. When galaxies pass through each other, unlike during mergers, they largely retain their material and shape after the pass.

Galactic collisions are now frequently simulated on computers, which use realistic physics principles, including the simulation of gravitational forces, gas dissipation phenomena, star formation, and feedback. Dynamical friction slows the relative motion of galaxy pairs, which may possibly merge at some point, according to the initial relative energy of the orbits. A library of simulated galaxy collisions can be found at the Paris Observatory website GALMER.

== Galaxy harassment ==
Galaxy harassment is a type of interaction between a low-luminosity galaxy and a brighter one that takes place within rich galaxy clusters, such as Virgo and Coma, where galaxies are moving at high relative speeds and suffering frequent encounters with other systems of the cluster due to the high galactic density.

According to computer simulations, the interactions convert the affected galaxy disks into disturbed barred spiral galaxies and produces starbursts followed by, if more encounters occur, loss of angular momentum and heating of their gas. The result would be the conversion of (late type) low-luminosity spiral galaxies into dwarf spheroidals and dwarf ellipticals.

Evidence for the hypothesis had been claimed by studying early-type dwarf galaxies in the Virgo Cluster and finding structures, such as disks and spiral arms, which suggest they are former disc systems transformed by the above-mentioned interactions. The existence of similar structures in isolated early-type dwarf galaxies, such as LEDA 2108986, has undermined this hypothesis.

== Notable examples ==
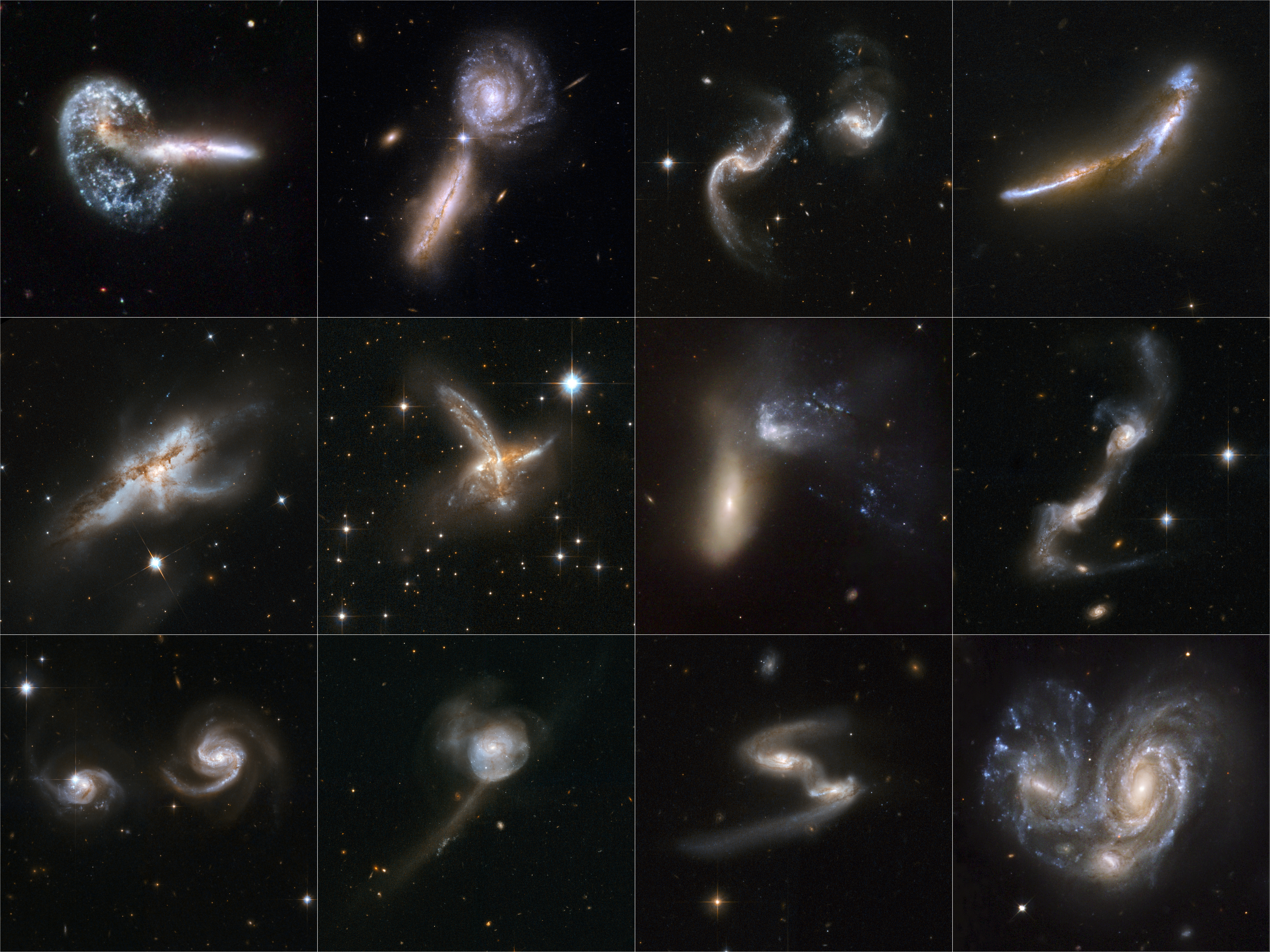
Montage of some well known interacting galaxies

| Name | Type | Distance (million ly) | Magnitude | Notes |
|---|---|---|---|---|
| Milky Way Galaxy, LMC and SMC | SBc/SB(s)m/SB(s)m pec | 0 | | Satellites interacting with their primary |
| Whirlpool Galaxy (M51) | SAc (SB0-a) | 37 | +8.4 | Satellite interacting with its primary |
| NGC 1097 | SB(s)bc (E6) | 45 | +9.5 | Satellite interacting with its primary |
| Butterfly Galaxies NGC 4567/8 | SA(rs)bc / SA(rs)bc | 60 | +10.9 | Early phase of interaction |
| NGC 2207 and IC 2163 | SAc/SAbc | 114 | +11 | Galaxies going through the first phase in galactic collision |
| Mice Galaxies (NGC 4676A and NGC 4676B) | S0/SB(s)ab | 300 | +13.5 | Galaxies going through the second phase in galactic collision |
| Antennae Galaxies (NGC 4038/9) | SAc/SBm | 45 | +10.3 | Galaxies going through the third phase in galactic collision |
| NGC 520 | S | 100 | +11.3 | Galaxies going through the third phase in galactic collision |
| NGC 2936 | Irr | 352 | +12.9 | ? |

== Andromeda–Milky Way collision ==
Astronomers have estimated the Milky Way Galaxy will collide with the Andromeda Galaxy in about 4.5 billion years. Thanks to the Hubble Space Telescope, astronomers were able to more accurately track Andromeda's movement, leading to the conclusion that the two galaxies will temporarily touch before eventually undergoing an ultimate merging. Some think the two spiral galaxies will eventually merge to become an elliptical galaxy whose gravitational interactions will fling various celestial bodies outward, evicting them from the resulting elliptical galaxy. or perhaps a large disc galaxy.

== Black holes and interacting galaxies ==
According to recent studies, galactic interactions may play an important role in triggering black hole activity by driving gas toward the central regions of galaxies, where it fuels supermassive black hole accretion and AGN activity. Both observational evidence and simulations suggest that this inflow of gas can ignite active galactic nucleus (AGN) activity. A 2014 study suggests that AGN fueling depends on the gas content and evolutionary state of the host galaxy. They found that blue, star forming galaxies host radiatively efficient AGN fueled by cold gas, while passive and more massive galaxies host radio AGN fueled by mechanically dominated accretion. A 2020 study found that the incidence of AGN is significantly higher in quenched (post-starburst) galaxies. They argue that this trend most likely reflects a continued availability of residual gas, rather than quenching being a direct consequence of black hole feedback on the host galaxy. Together, these studies support an evolutionary sequence in which galaxy interactions, star formation, and AGN activity are closely intertwined in shaping galaxy evolution.

== See also ==
- NGC 7318
