= NGC 520 =

Pair of colliding spiral galaxies in the constellation Pisces

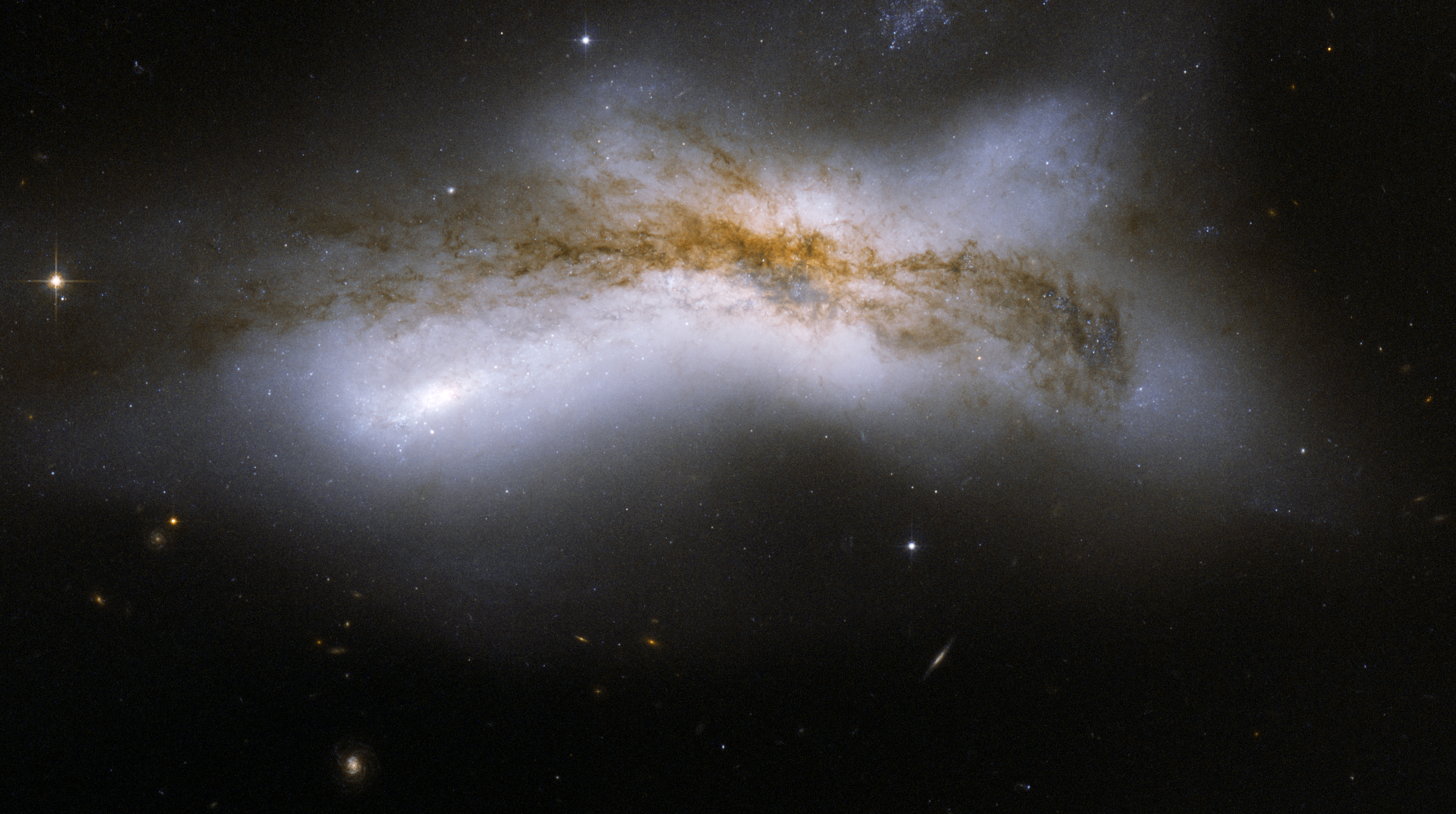
- NGC 520 imaged by the Hubble Space Telescope

Observation data (J2000 epoch)
- Constellation: Pisces
- Right ascension: 01^{h} 24^{m} 35.071^{s}
- Declination: +03° 47′ 32.68″
- Redshift: 0.007609±0.000010
- Heliocentric radial velocity: 2,281±3 km/s
- Distance: 105 Mly (32.2 Mpc)
- Apparent magnitude (V): 12.2

Characteristics
- Type: Pec
- Size: ~103,500 ly (31.74 kpc) (estimated)
- Apparent size (V): 3.4′ × 1.7′
- Notable features: Interacting galaxies

Other designations
- IRAS 01219+0331, Arp 157, UGC 966, MCG +01-04-052, PGC 5193, CGCG 411-050, VV 231

NGC 520, also known as the Flying Ghost, is a pair of colliding spiral galaxies about 105 million light-years away in the constellation Pisces. They were discovered by astronomer William Herschel on 13 December 1784.

Halton Arp called this the second-brightest very disturbed galaxy in the sky, and it is as bright in the infrared and radio bands as the Antennae Galaxies. Simulations indicate this object consists of two galactic disks that began interacting about 300 million years ago. The system is still in an early stage of its merger, showing two separate velocity systems in the spectra, and two small tails. Two galactic nuclei have been detected, and one is an H II nucleus.

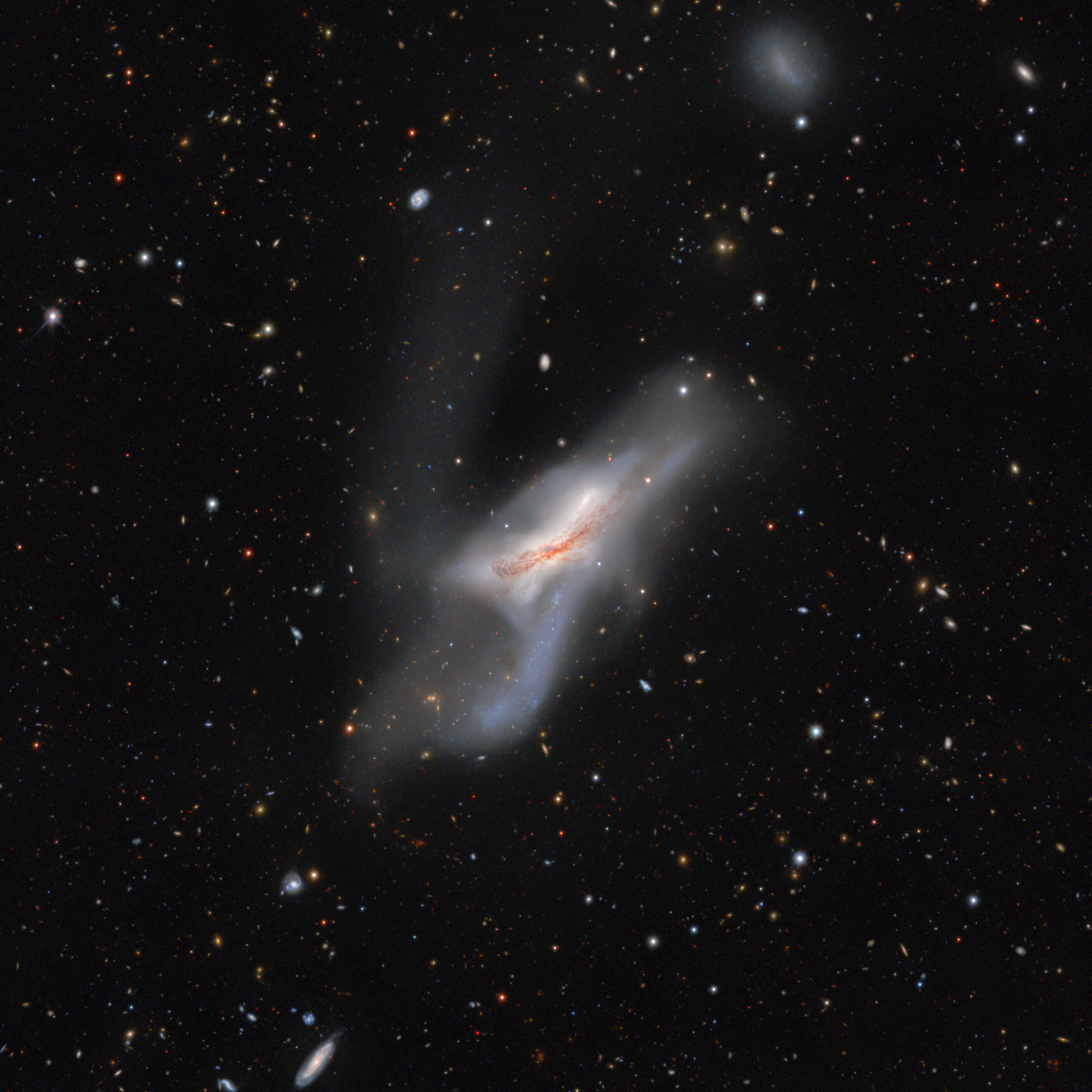
NGC 520 imaged by the Cerro Tololo Inter-American Observatory

The main galactic component is being viewed edge-on, making it fainter in the optical band. The secondary component is brighter but less massive than the main, and is located to the northwest. They are separated by a dark lane of dust. The region of the galaxies outside their nuclei experienced a period of increased star formation roughly around the time they began to interact. Two dwarf objects are located in the vicinity of this merging pair, and one of them, designated UGC 957, is located in the northern tidal tail – it may be the result of the interaction. NGC 520 has a star formation rate surface density ($\Sigma_{SFR}$) of $1.32 M_\odot yr^{-1} kpc^{-2}$.

When viewed in the X-ray band, the interacting galaxies appear around half as luminous as expected given their merger state. Analysis of the gas and molecular features suggests the secondary merger component is gas poor. Most of the star formation, therefore, took place in the gas-rich main component to the southeast. 15 X-ray sources are detected within the merger, with many of them displaying long-term variability. A large galactic wind is evident, being driven by the starburst activity.

== Supernova ==
One supernova has been observed in NGC 520: SN 2025zjx (Type II, mag. 21.68) was discovered by Pan-STARRS on 29 September 2025.

== NGC 470 Group ==
It is part of a galaxy group known as NGC 470 Group or LGG 20. It has at least 3 members, which are NGC 474, NGC 470 and UGC 957.

== See also ==
- List of NGC objects (1–1000)
