= NGC 3156 =

Galaxy in the constellation Sextans

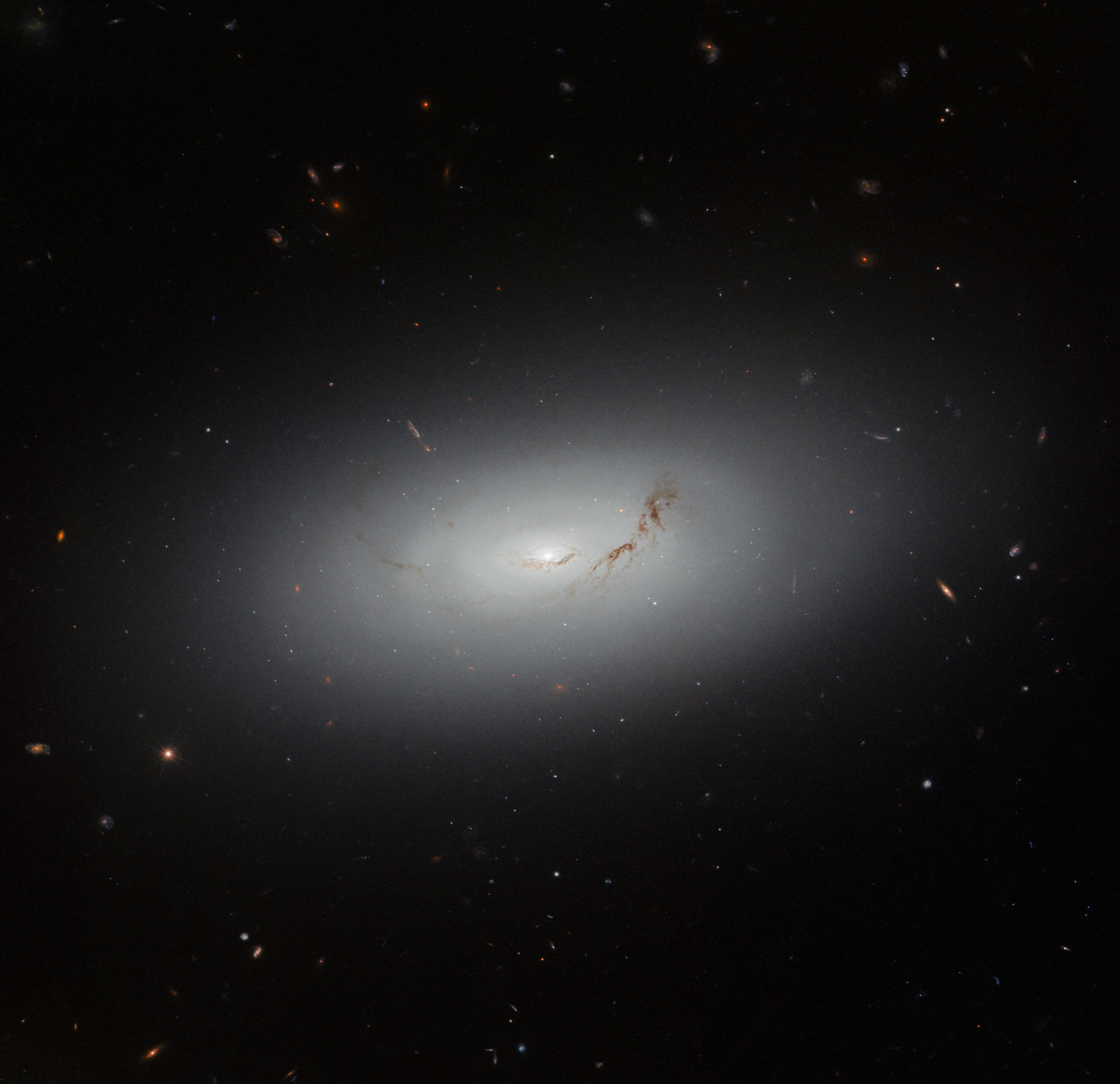
- NGC 3156 by Hubble Space Telescope

Observation data (J2000 epoch)
- Constellation: Sextans
- Right ascension: 10^{h} 12^{m} 41.24591^{s}
- Declination: +03° 07′ 45.6939″
- Redshift: 0.00415
- Heliocentric radial velocity: 1242 km/s
- Distance: 72.67 ± 0.46 Mly (22.28 ± 0.14 Mpc)
- Apparent magnitude (V): 12.30
- Apparent magnitude (B): 13.07

Characteristics
- Type: S0

Other designations
- UGC 5503, MCG +01-26-019, PGC 29730

NGC 3156 is a lenticular galaxy located in the constellation Sextans. It is located at a distance of about 75 million light-years from Earth and is forming a pair with NGC 3169. It was discovered by astronomer William Herschel on December 13, 1784.

It is a member of the NGC 3166 Group of galaxies, which is a member of the Leo II Groups, a series of galaxies and galaxy clusters strung out from the right edge of the Virgo Supercluster.

== Gallery ==
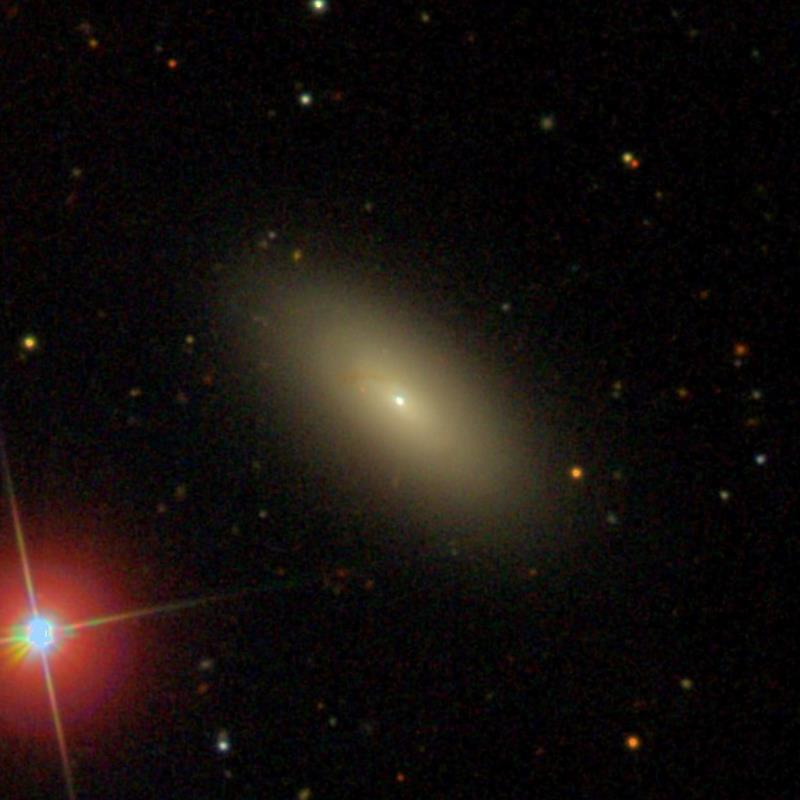
NGC 3156 (SDSS DR14)
