= NGC 3169 =

Galaxy in the constellation Sextans

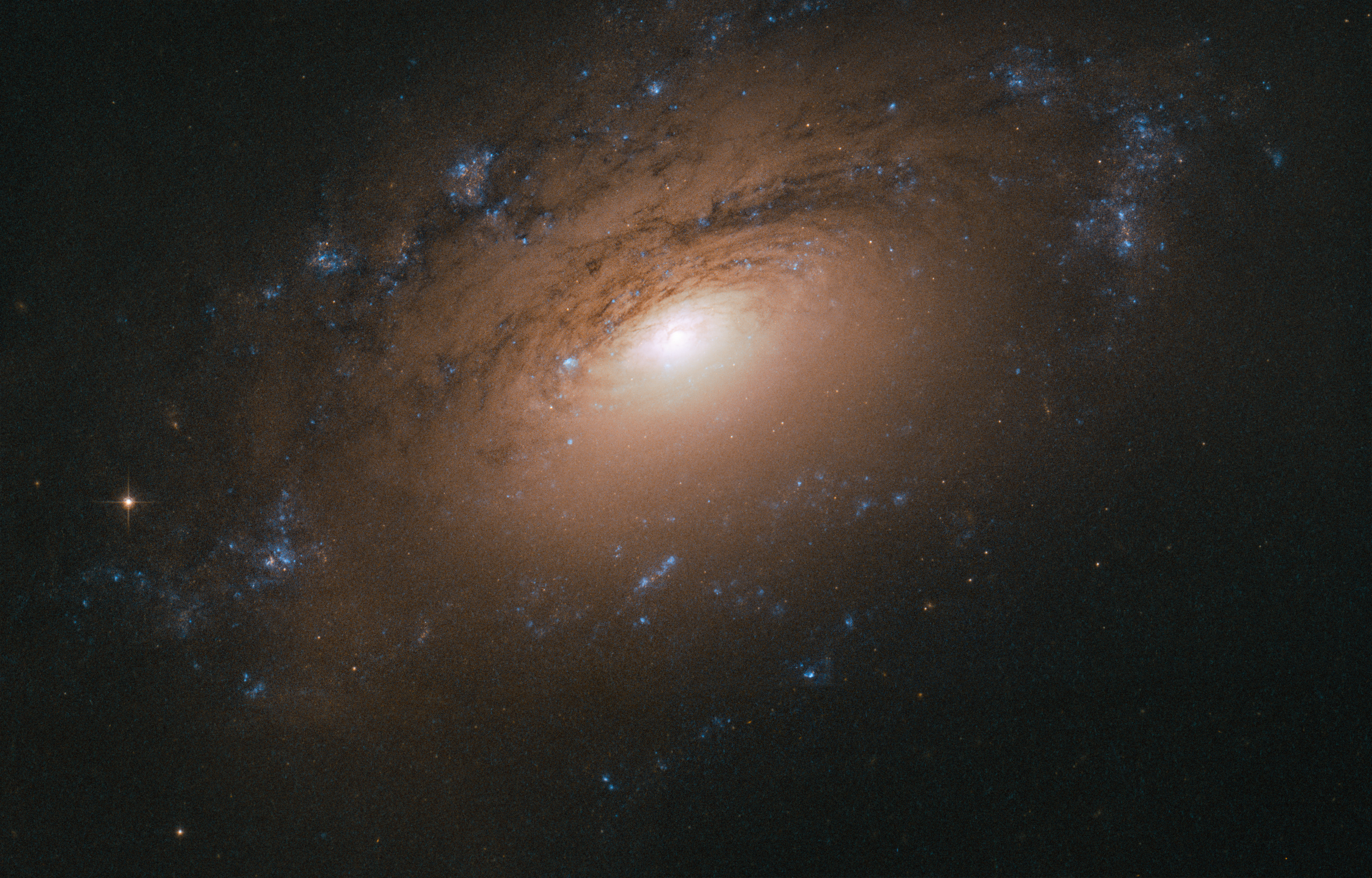
- NGC 3169 imaged by the Hubble Space Telescope

Observation data (J2000 epoch)
- Constellation: Sextans
- Right ascension: 10^{h} 14^{m} 15.099^{s}
- Declination: +03° 27′ 58.03″
- Redshift: +0.004113±0.000017
- Heliocentric radial velocity: 1,232 km/s
- Distance: 57 Mly (17 Mpc)
- Apparent magnitude (V): 10.3

Characteristics
- Type: SA(s)a pec
- Apparent size (V): 4.2′ × 2.9′

Other designations
- NGC 3169, UGC 5525, PGC 29855

NGC 3169 is a spiral galaxy about 75 million light years away in the constellation Sextans. It has the morphological classification SA(s)a pec, which indicates this is a pure, unbarred spiral galaxy with tightly-wound arms and peculiar features. There is an asymmetrical spiral arm and an extended halo around the galaxy. It is a member of the NGC 3166 Group of galaxies, which is a member of the Leo II Groups, a series of galaxies and galaxy clusters strung out from the right edge of the Virgo Supercluster.

This is a LINER 2 galaxy that displays an extended emission of X-rays in the region of the nucleus. A hard X-ray source at the center most likely indicates an active galactic nucleus. The stellar population in the nucleus, and a ring at an angular radius of 6″, shows an age of only one billion years and is generally younger than the surrounding stellar population. This suggests that a burst of star formation took place in the nucleus roughly one billion years ago.

NGC 3169 is located in close physical proximity to NGC 3166, and the two have an estimated separation of around 160 kly (50 kpc). Their interaction is creating a gravitational distortion that has left the disk of NGC 3166 warped. Combined with NGC 3156, the three galaxies form a small group within the larger Leo 1 group. The three are embedded within an extended ring of neutral hydrogen that is centered on NGC 3169.

== Supernovae ==
Two supernovae have been observed in NGC 3169:

- SN 1984E (Type II-L, mag. 14.5) was codiscovered by Nataliya Metlova on 26 March 1984, and by Robert Evans on 29 March 1984. The spectrum of this event at maximum light showed prominent Balmer lines that indicated the explosion occurred inside a dense shell of hydrogen surrounding the star. This shell was likely created by a strong stellar wind from the progenitor star.
- SN 2003 cg (Type Ia, mag. 14.4) was codiscovered by Kōichi Itagaki and Ron Arbour on 21 March 2003.
