= Arp 7 =

Galaxy in the constellation Hydra

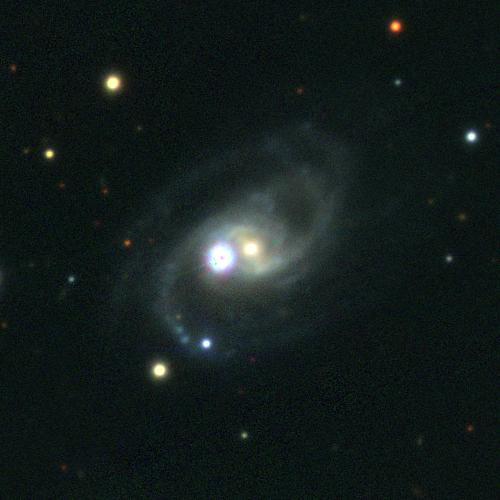
- Arp 7 by PanSTARRS

Observation data (J2000 epoch)
- Constellation: Hydra
- Right ascension: 8^{h} 50^{m} 30.0^{s}
- Declination: −16° 37′ 00″
- Redshift: 0.018620±0.000002
- Heliocentric radial velocity: 5,582±1 km/s
- Galactocentric velocity: 5,384±8 km/s
- Distance: 103.9 ± 146.4 Mly (31.853 ± 44.901 Mpc)
- Apparent magnitude (V): 14.5
- Magnitude (J): 11.795
- Magnitude (H): 11.115
- Magnitude (K): 10.954

Characteristics
- Type: SB(rs)bc: HII
- Size: 40,737 ly (12.49 kpc) (diameter; 25.0 B-mag arcsec^{−2}) (Note: The quick-look major axis physical diameters given by NED of 12.49 kiloparsecs (40,700 light-years) and 8.82 by 8.11 kiloparsecs (28,800 by 26,500 light-years) were based on distance estimates of 31.853 ± 44.901 Mpc (103.9×10^{6} ± 146.4×10^{6} ly) using a scale of 154.4 parsec/arcsec multiplied with given angular diameters.); 28,767 ly × 26,451 ly (8.82 kpc × 8.11 kpc) (diameter; "total" magnitude)
- Apparent size (V): 1.3′ × 1.0′

Other designations
- PGC 024836, APG 7

Arp 7 (PGC 24836) is a spiral galaxy in the constellation Hydra. Redshift-independent measurements of its distance vary widely, from 5.9 to 83.7 megaparsecs (19.24 to 273.0 million light-years). Its morphological classification is SB(rs)bc, meaning it is a barred spiral galaxy with some ring-like structure.

Arp 7 was imaged by Halton Arp and included in his Atlas of Peculiar Galaxies under the category of 'split arm' galaxies. Five other galaxies are also included in this section of the atlas: Arp 8 (NGC 497), Arp 9 (NGC 2523), Arp 10 (UGC 1775), Arp 11 (UGC 717), and Arp 12 (NGC 2608).

Arp 7 is known to be both Seyfert I galaxy and HII galaxy.
