= IRAS 20414−1651 =

Galaxy in the constellation of Capricornus

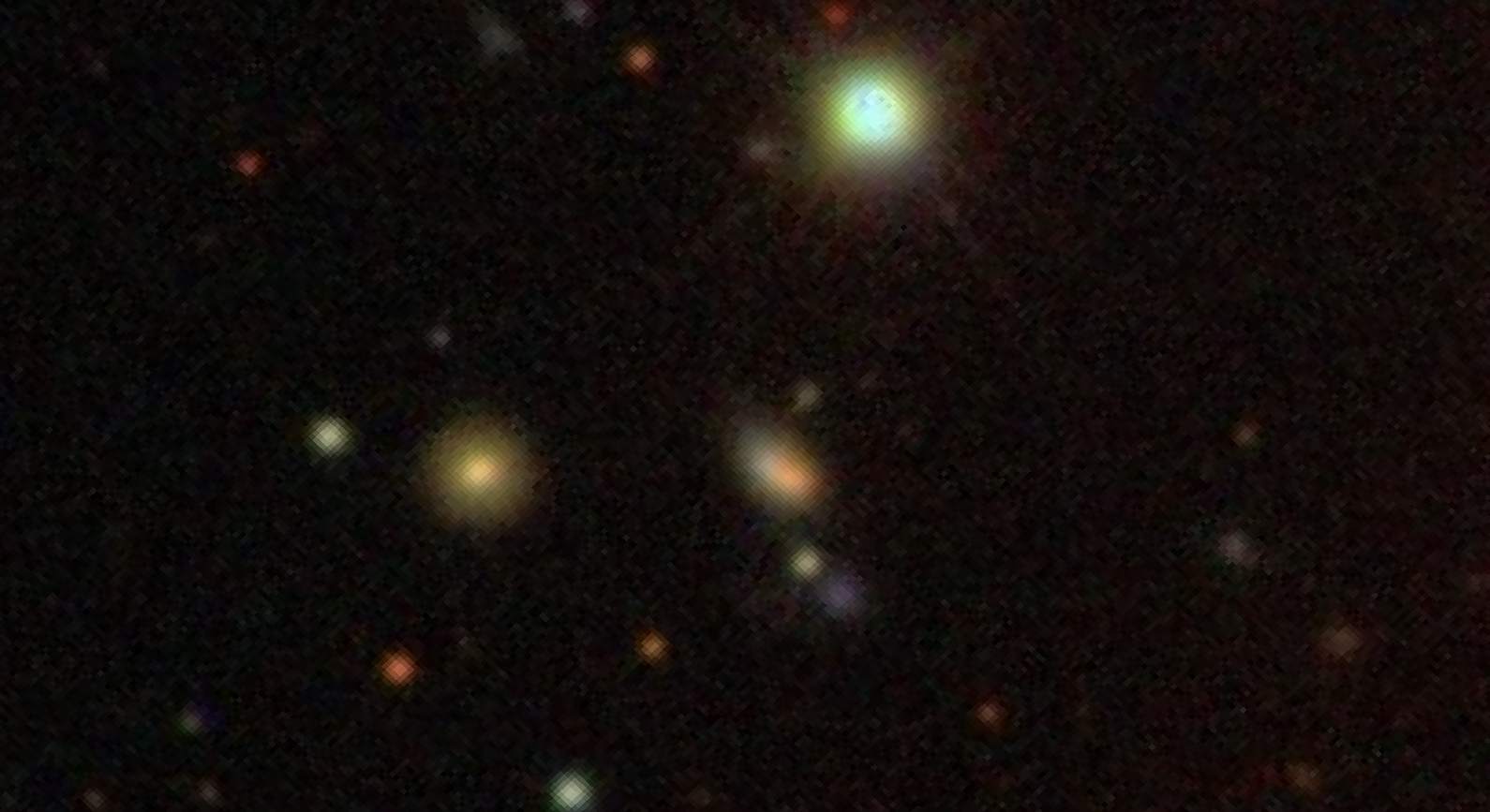
- SDSS image of IRAS 20414−1651

Observation data (J2000.0 epoch)
- Constellation: Capricornus
- Right ascension: 20^{h} 44^{m} 18.18^{s}
- Declination: −16° 40′ 16.38″
- Redshift: 0.086136
- Heliocentric radial velocity: 25,823 km/s
- Distance: 1.160 Gly
- Apparent magnitude (B): 18.02

Characteristics
- Type: LINER;HII

Other designations
- IRAS F20414-1651, NVSS J204418-164016, LEDA 90371, AKARI J2044182-164019

IRAS 20414−1651 is an ultraluminous infrared galaxy located in the southern constellation of Capricornus. The redshift of the galaxy is (z) 0.086 and was first discovered by astronomers in September 1990, who found it has a total infrared luminosity of 13.5 × 10^{11} L_{☉}.

== Description ==
IRAS 20414−1651 is an HII galaxy. It is classified as a strong interacting system based on observations with the New Technology Telescope and a compact merger according to optical/near-infrared imaging analysis results. The morphology of the galaxy is described as peculiar with a horseshoe shaped main body and some extension towards the south for 17 kiloparsecs, subsequently bending to the west to meet up with a blue stellar condensation feature. I-band imaging made with Hubble Space Telescope has shown this central body of the galaxy to be complex, containing obscured knots and patches. There is an elongated and dusty core.

IRAS 20414−1651 has a region of Hydrogen-alpha emission showing an orientation from north to south across its main galactic disc. There is also an identified component located west that is shown blueshifted by 100 to 200 kilometers per seconds, but it is unknown if it is a sign of an outflow. There is evidence of a south-western companion located 10.5 arcseconds away from the main galaxy body. This companion is known to exhibit signs of ongoing star formation given the presence of split line components with velocity separations of between 400 and 500 kilometer per second.

The galaxy can be classified as a starburst galaxy with a star formation rate of 300 ± 15 M_{☉} and stellar mass of 10.42^{+0.35}_{-0.13} M_{☉} per year. It shows evidence of very young stellar populations found as highly reddened based on modelling results of its infrared emission powered by starbursts. Based on the results, the stellar population is estimated to be around six million years old. Double peaked emission lines of mainly hydrogen cyanide, hydrogencarbonate and hydrogen isocyanide elements were also detected in the galaxy, according to Atacama Large Millimeter Array (ALMA) observations.

The supermassive black hole in the center of IRAS 20414−1651 is estimated to have a mass of 10.3 × 10^{7} M_{☉} based on a study conducted in 2022 on 42 ultraluminous galaxies using the Herschel Space Observatory. The galaxy has been found to have a single nucleus.
