= IRAS 18580+6527 =

Seyfert galaxy in the constellation Draco

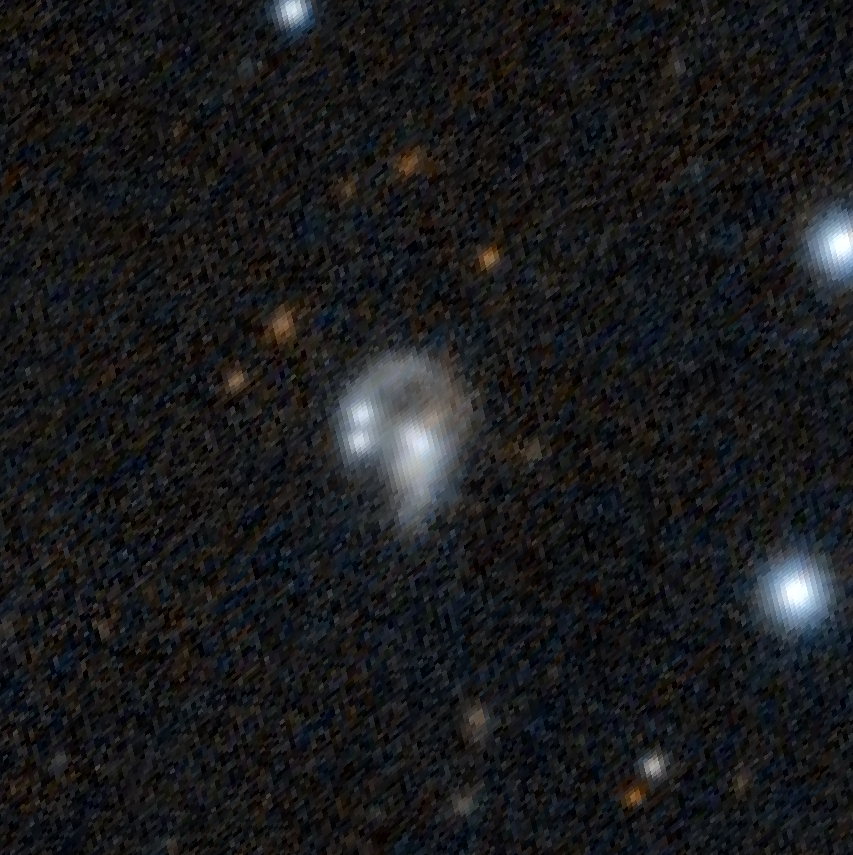
- Pan-STARRS image of IRAS 18580+6527

Observation data (J2000.0 epoch)
- Constellation: Draco
- Right ascension: 18^{h} 58^{m} 13.90^{s}
- Declination: +65° 31′ 24.00″
- Redshift: 0.176400
- Heliocentric radial velocity: 52,883 km/s
- Distance: 2,554.2 ± 178.8 Mly (783.13 ± 54.82 Mpc)
- Magnitude (J): 14.75 (VII Zw 852 NOTES02)

Characteristics
- Type: E;Sbrst+Sy2
- Size: ~303,000 ly (92.8 kpc) (estimated) (VII Zw 852 NOTES02)

Other designations
- VII Zw 852, WN B1858+6527, IRAS F18580+6527, CGPG 1858.0+6527, PGC 62625 & PGC 62626

IRAS 18580+6527 is a Seyfert galaxy located in the constellation of Draco. The redshift of the galaxy is (z) 0.176 and it was first discovered by a Swiss astronomer named Fritz Zwicky in 1971, whom he described them as a pair of compact galaxies that are separated by 7 arcseconds from each other. This pair has also been referred in Zwicky's catalogue as VII Zw 852 with the first galaxy named VII Zw 852 NOTES01 and the other named VII Zw NOTES02.

== Description ==
IRAS 18580+6527 is categorized as an ultraluminous infrared galaxy with an infrared luminosity rate of 12.26 L_{☉}. It is also classified as an interacting pair of galaxies, with strong evidence that they will eventually merge with each other based on deep imaging observations. The nucleus on the western component of the galaxy is found to be active and has been categorized as a Seyfert galaxy of type 2. Meanwhile, the nucleus on the eastern component has been described as a H II galaxy. The star formation rate has been estimated as 35.9 ± 17.6 M_{☉} per year.

It has been theorized that IRAS 18580+6527 is a product of several galaxy mergers. Imaging made by Hubble Space Telescope (HST) has found the western component contains four compact cores located in its central regions, suggesting the cores are remnants of four galaxies that have been coalescence into the former through tidal forces. The cores are also found to contain traces of faint hotspot features. H-band imaging showed at least one of the cores is shown as dust obscured based on its blotchy appearance. A fifth core is suggested to lie six kiloparsecs away from the four cores in the north direction. HST also detected several bright regions surrounding a much larger bright region, with detections of two more of these same regions located east. There is also a single tidal tail extending at 10 arcseconds towards northwest direction. A tidal ring feature is present and has a diameter of 20 kiloparsecs in length.
