= NGC 2441 =

Galaxy in the constellation Camelopardalis

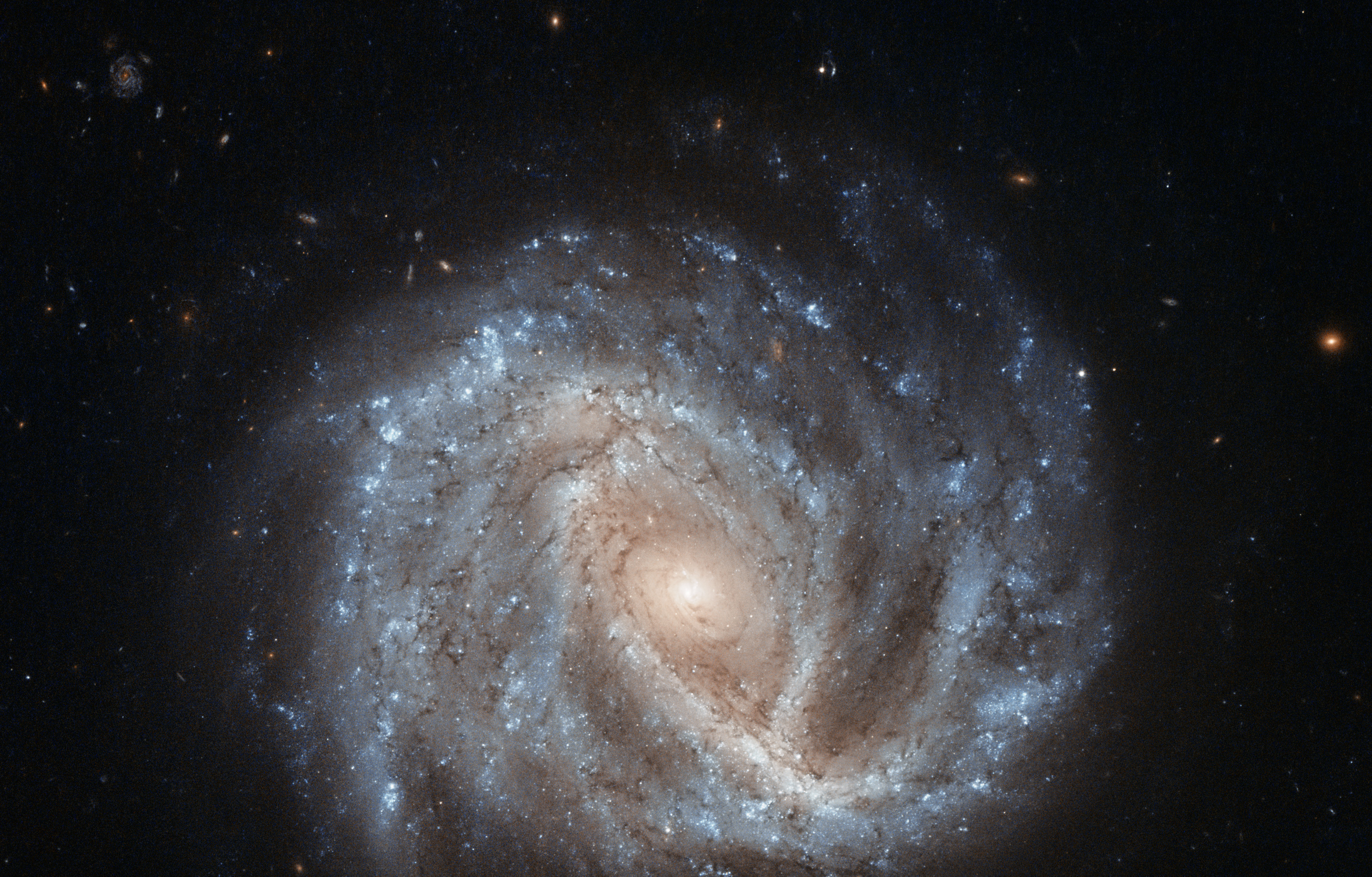
- NGC 2441 imaged by the Hubble Space Telescope

Observation data (J2000 epoch)
- Constellation: Camelopardalis
- Right ascension: 07^{h} 51^{m} 54.772^{s}
- Declination: +73° 00′ 56.42″
- Redshift: 0.01157
- Heliocentric radial velocity: 3450 km/s
- Distance: 180 million ly
- Group or cluster: NGC 2523 Group
- Apparent magnitude (B): 12.7

Characteristics
- Type: SBc
- Size: ~117,900 ly (36.14 kpc) (estimated)
- Apparent size (V): 2.633 x 1.159 arcmin

Other designations
- IRAS 07460+7308, 2MASX J07515477+7300564, UGC 4036, MCG +12-08-015, PGC 22031, CGCG 331-017

NGC 2441 is a barred spiral galaxy located in the northern constellation of Camelopardalis. Its velocity with respect to the cosmic microwave background is 3492 ± 2 km/s, which corresponds to a Hubble distance of 168.0 ± 11.8 Mly (51.51 ± 3.61 Mpc). In addition, 16 non-redshift measurements give a distance of 176.16 ± 16.80 Mly (54.012 ± 5.151 Mpc). The galaxy was discovered by German astronomer Wilhelm Tempel on 8 August 1882.

According to A.M. Garcia, NGC 2441 is a member of the NGC 2523 galaxy group (also known as LGG 154). This group contains five galaxies, including NGC 2523, NGC 2550A, UGC 4041, and UGC 4199.

One supernova has been observed in NGC 2441. SN1995E (type Ia, mag. 15) was discovered by Alessandro Gabrielcic on 20 February 1995, and observations suggested it may display a light echo, where light from the supernova is reflected from matter along our line of sight, making it appear to "echo" outwards from the source.

== Image gallery ==
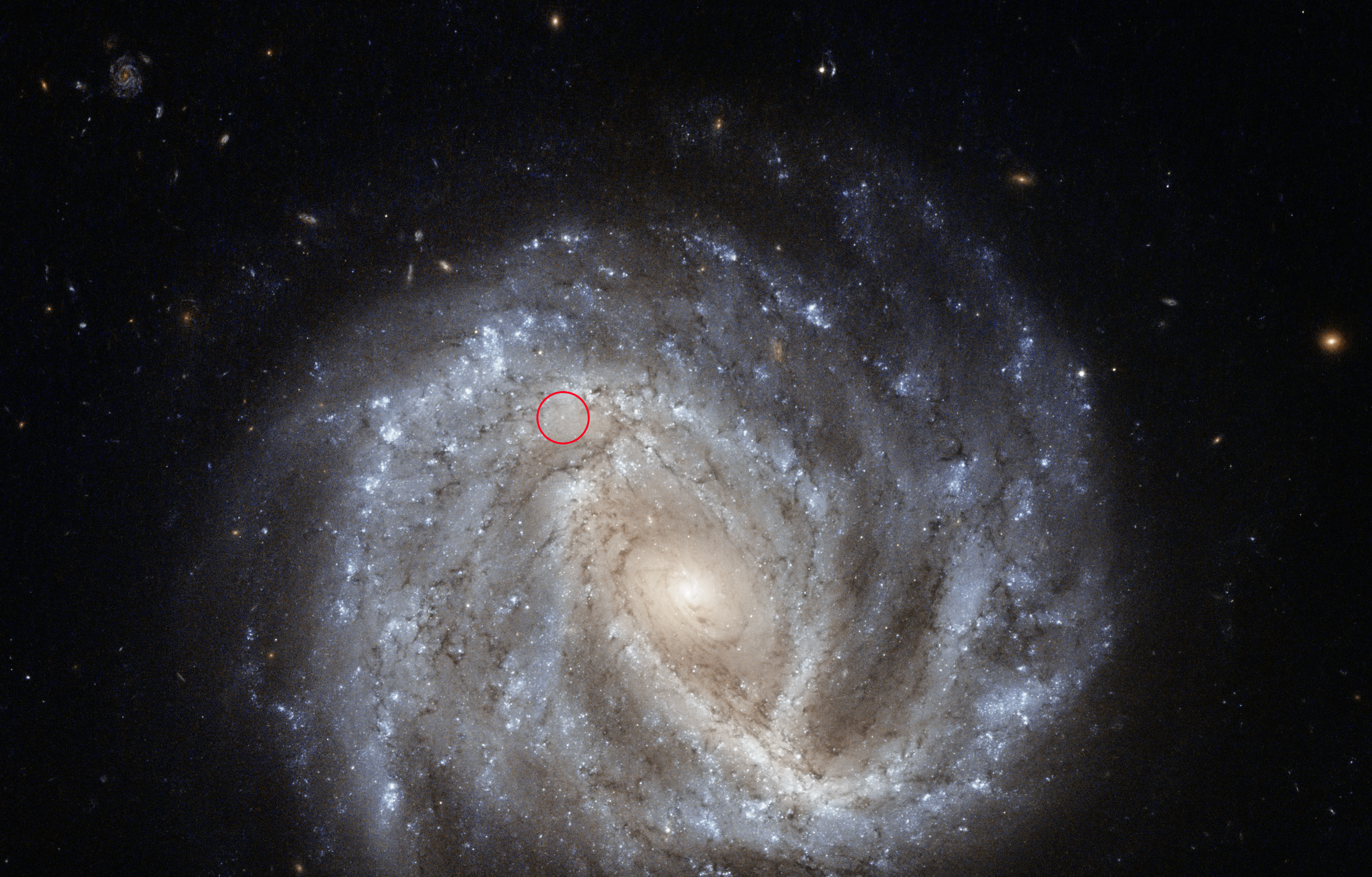
In this Hubble Space Telescope image of NGC 2441, supernova SN1995E is the white spot within the red circle.

== See also ==
- List of NGC objects (2001–3000)
