= NGC 2550A =

Galaxy in the constellation Camelopardalis

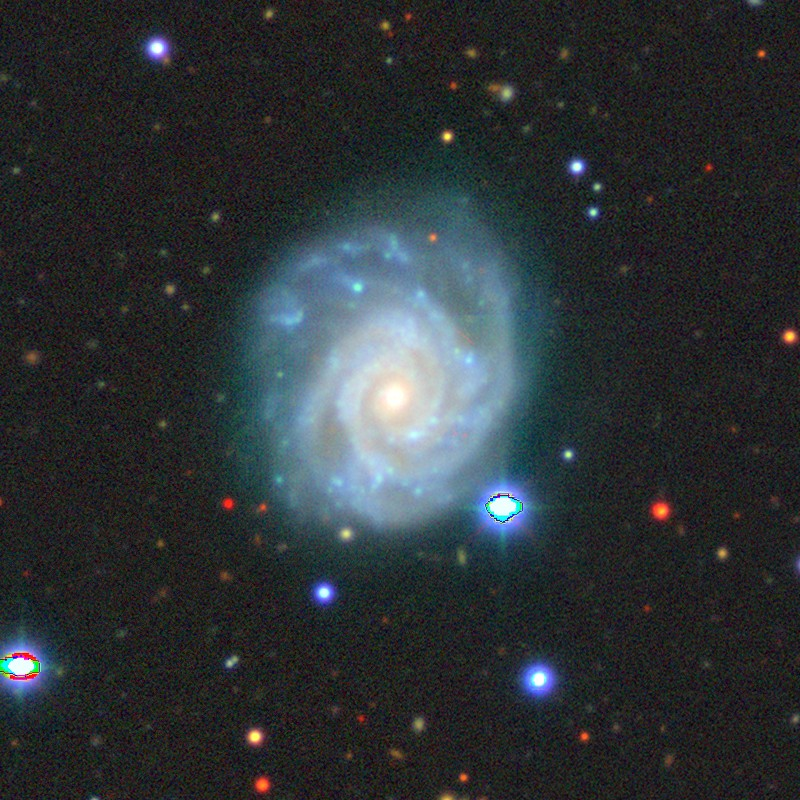
- NGC 2550A imaged by Legacy Surveys

Observation data (J2000 epoch)
- Constellation: Camelopardalis
- Right ascension: 08^{h} 28^{m} 39.9646^{s}
- Declination: +73° 44′ 53.423″
- Redshift: 0.012125
- Heliocentric radial velocity: 3635 ± 10 km/s
- Distance: 176.5 ± 12.4 Mly (54.12 ± 3.79 Mpc)
- Group or cluster: NGC 2523 Group
- Apparent magnitude (V): 12.7

Characteristics
- Type: Sc
- Size: ~112,400 ly (34.47 kpc) (estimated)
- Apparent size (V): 1.6′ × 1.4′

Other designations
- IRAS 08230+7354, 2MASX J08283996+7344526, UGC 4397, MCG +12-08-043, PGC 23781, CGCG 331-043

NGC 2550A is a spiral galaxy in the constellation of Camelopardalis. Its velocity with respect to the cosmic microwave background is 3670 ± 10 km/s, which corresponds to a Hubble distance of 176.5 ± 12.4 Mly (54.12 ± 3.79 Mpc). The discovery of this galaxy is credited to Philip C. Keenan, in his paper Studies of Extra-Galactic Nebulae. Part I: Determination of Magnitudes, published in The Astrophysical Journal in 1935.

According to A.M. Garcia, NGC 2550A is a member of the NGC 2523 galaxy group (also known as LGG 154). This group contains five galaxies, including NGC 2441, NGC 2523, UGC 4041, and UGC 4199.

== Supernovae ==
Two supernovae have been observed in NGC 2550A:

- SN 2008P (Type II, mag. 17.5) was discovered by Alessandro Dimai on 23 January 2008.
- SN 2024ws (Type II, mag. 17.8) was discovered by Kōichi Itagaki on 12 January 2024.

== See also ==
- List of NGC objects (2001–3000)
