= NGC 2523B =

Galaxy in the constellation Camelopardalis

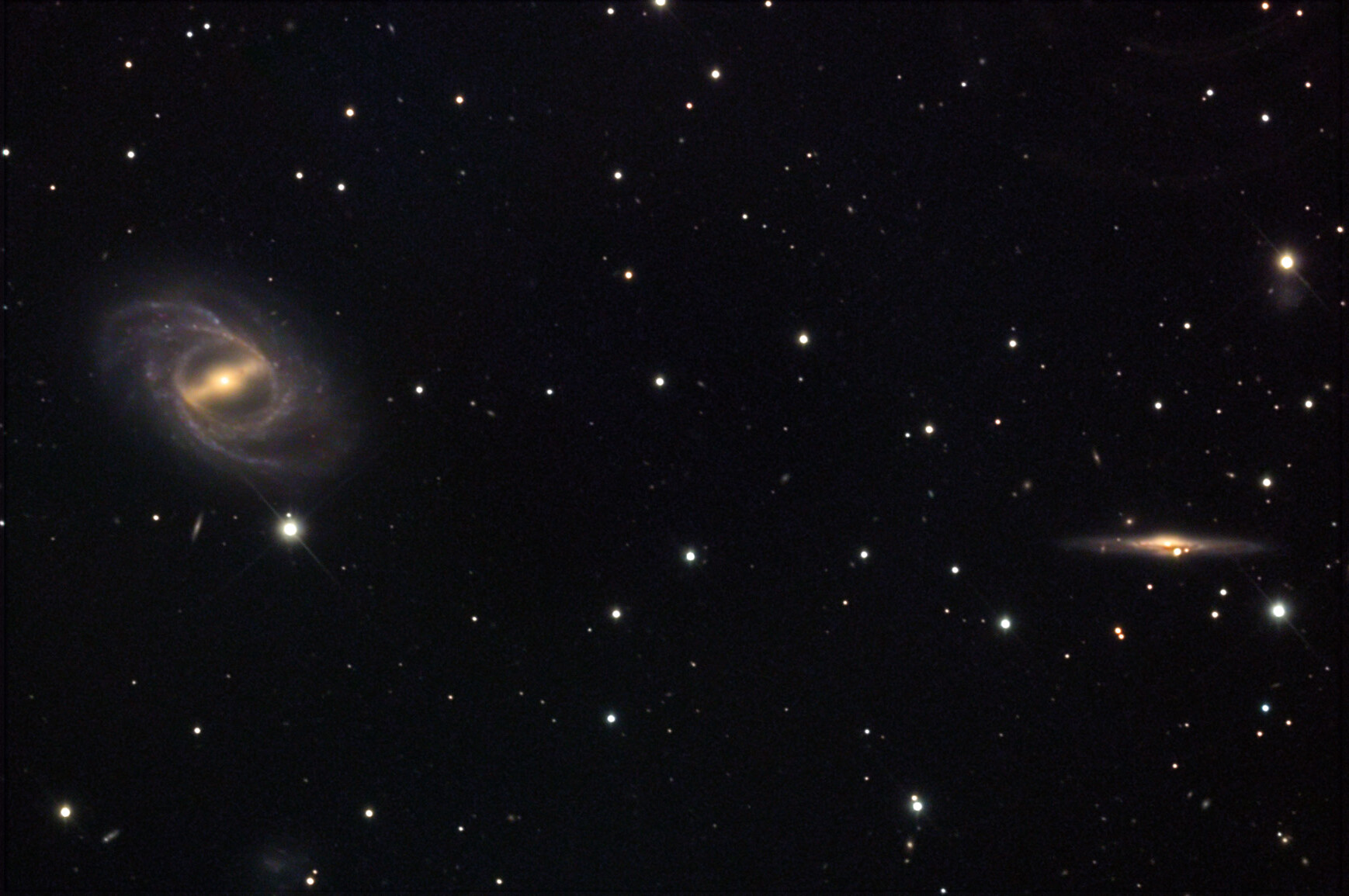
- NGC 2523 (left) next to NGC 2523B (right)

Observation data (J2000 epoch)
- Constellation: Camelopardalis
- Right ascension: 08^{h} 12^{m} 57.0475^{s}
- Declination: +73° 33′ 47.883″
- Redshift: 0.012782
- Distance: 185.8 ± 13.0 Mly (56.97 ± 3.99 Mpc)
- Group or cluster: UGC 4057 Group (LGG 149)
- Apparent magnitude (V): 14

Characteristics
- Type: SA(s)b? edge-on

Other designations
- IRAS 08072+7342, UGC 4259, MCG +12-08-030, PGC 23025, CGCG 331-030

NGC 2523B is a spiral galaxy located around 186 million light-years away in the constellation Camelopardalis. The discovery of this galaxy is credited to Philip C. Keenan, in his paper Studies of Extra-Galactic Nebulae. Part I: Determination of Magnitudes, published in The Astrophysical Journal in 1935.

According to A.M. Garcia, NGC 2523B is a member of the five member UGC 4057 galaxy group (also known as LGG 149). The other galaxies in the group are NGC 2523, UGC 4014, UGC 4028, and UGC 4057.

== See also ==
- List of NGC objects (2001–3000)
