= NGC 2523 =

Galaxy in the constellation Camelopardalis

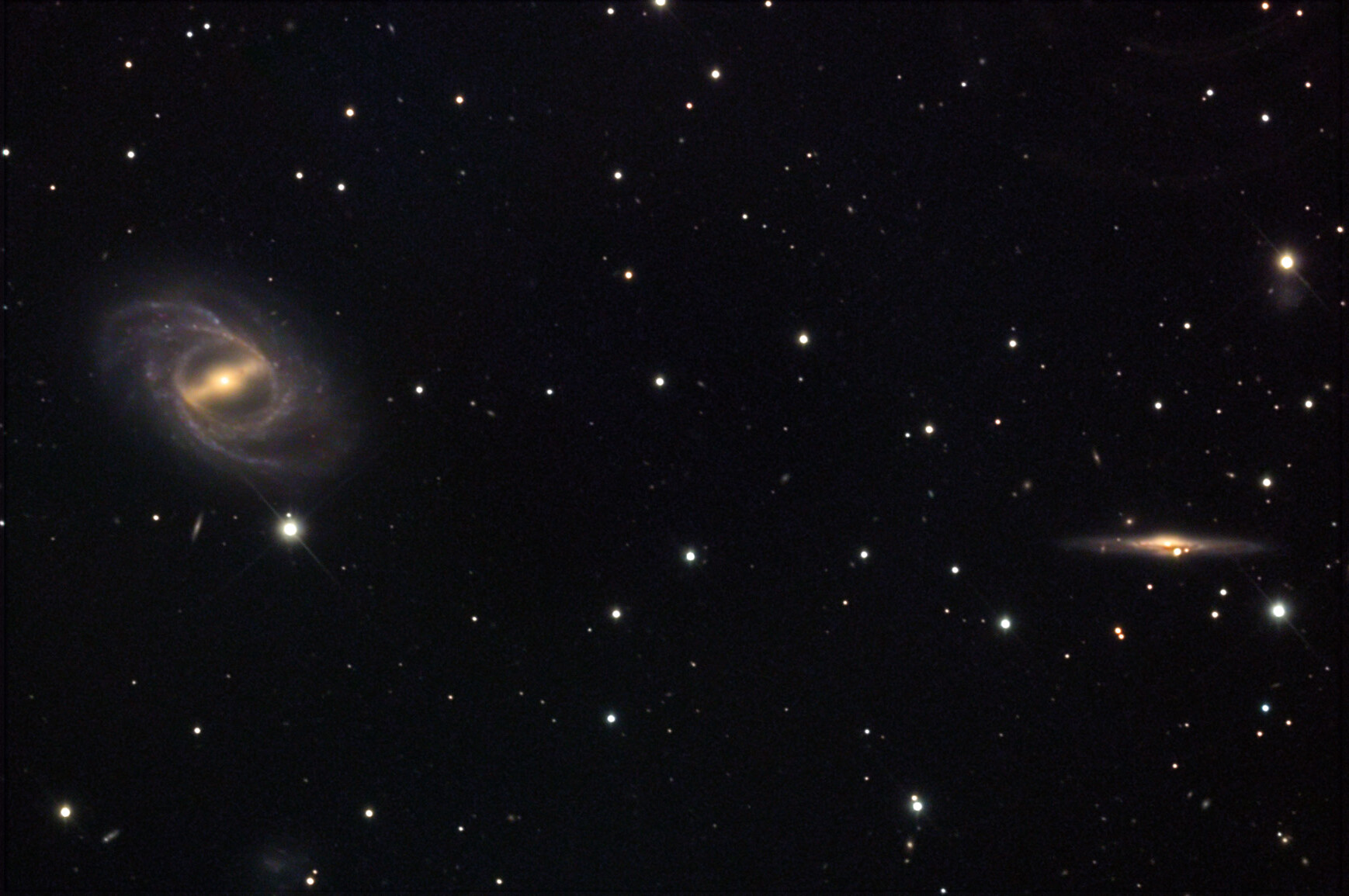
- NGC 2523 (left) next to NGC 2523B (right)

Observation data (J2000 epoch)
- Constellation: Camelopardalis
- Right ascension: 08^{h} 15^{m} 00.193^{s}
- Declination: +73° 34′ 44.167″
- Redshift: 0.011578 ± 4.00e-5
- Distance: 168.5 ± 11.8 Mly (51.66 ± 3.62 Mpc)
- Group or cluster: NGC 2553 Group (LGG 154)
- Apparent magnitude (V): 10.2

Characteristics
- Type: SB(r)bc
- Size: ~120,000 ly (36.79 kpc) (estimated)
- Apparent size (V): 2.818′ × 1.778′

Other designations
- IRAS 08092+7343, Arp 9, UGC 4271, MCG +12-08-031, PGC 23128, CGCG 331-032

NGC 2523 is a barred spiral galaxy located around 168 million light-years away in the constellation Camelopardalis. NGC 2523 was discovered on 7 September 1885 by the American astronomer Edward Swift, and is approximately 120,000 light-years across. NGC 2523 does not have much star formation, and it does not have an active galactic nucleus.

NGC 2523 is one of several galaxies chosen by Halton Arp as an example of a spiral galaxy that has a separation of one of its arms. It is listed in Arp's Atlas of Peculiar Galaxies as Arp 9.

== NGC 2523 group ==
According to A.M. Garcia, NGC 2523 is the largest and brightest galaxy of the NGC 2523 Group (also known as LGG 154), which contains 5 galaxies, including NGC 2441, NGC 2550A, UGC 4041, and UGC 4199.

== Supernova ==
One supernova has been observed in NGC 2523: SN 2024aeee (Type II, mag. 16.5) was discovered by Shinichi Ono on 17 December 2024.

== See also ==
- List of NGC objects (2001–3000)
