= NGC 2608 =

Galaxy in the constellation Cancer

- NGC 2608 imaged by the Hubble Space Telescope

Observation data (J2000 epoch)
- Constellation: Cancer
- Right ascension: 08^{h} 35^{m} 17.3294^{s}
- Declination: +28° 28′ 24.294″
- Redshift: 0.007192±0.000009
- Heliocentric radial velocity: 2,156±3 km/s
- Distance: 93.0 Mly (28.5 Mpc)
- Apparent magnitude (V): 13.01

Characteristics
- Type: SB(s)b
- Size: ~59,300 ly (18.18 kpc) (estimated)
- Apparent size (V): 2.3′ × 1.4′

Other designations
- IRAS 08322+2838, Arp 12, UGC 4484, MCG +05-20-027, PGC 24111, CGCG 149-055

NGC 2608 (also known as Arp 12) is a barred spiral galaxy located 93 million light-years away in the constellation Cancer (the Crab). It was discovered by German-British astronomer William Herschel on 12 March 1785. It spans 62,000 light-years, approximately 60% of the Milky Way's diameter. It is considered a grand design spiral galaxy and is classified as SB(s)b, meaning that the galaxy's arms wind moderately (neither tightly nor loosely) around the prominent central bar.

It was classified under "galaxies with split arms" in the 1966 Atlas of Peculiar Galaxies by Halton Arp, who noted that the "nucleus may be double or superimposed star". NGC 2608 is now thought to be a pair of interacting galaxies.

== Supernovae ==
- SN 1920A was discovered on 8 February 1920, with an apparent magnitude of 12.9, by German astronomer Max Wolf (1863–1932). It reached peak brightness on 15 February 1920 at magnitude 12.05. Its visual magnitude implies an overluminous bolometric magnitude; SN 1920A has since been classified as anomalous and is believed to be the result of "a completely different explosion mechanism."
- SN 2001bg was discovered on 9 May 2001 (May 8.943 UT) by noted supernova hunter Tom Boles of Coddenham, Suffolk, England, with a 0.36 m Schmidt-Cassegrain telescope. When first observed, it had an apparent magnitude of 14; it later peaked at around 13.7. Its spectrum indicates that it is a typical Type Ia supernova.

== See also ==
- List of NGC objects (2001-3000)
