= NGC 497 =

Galaxy in the constellation Cetus

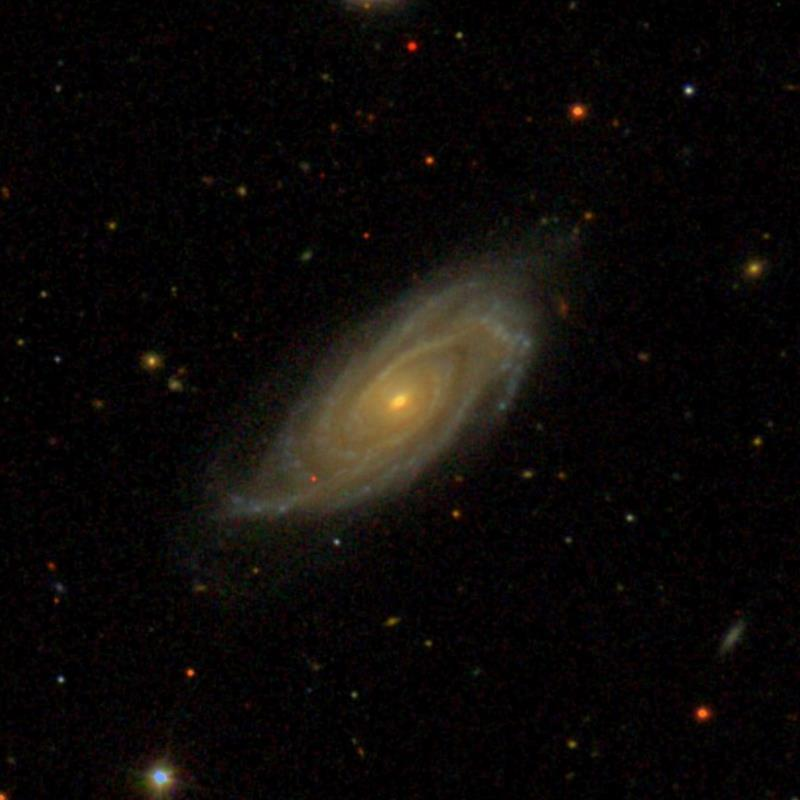
- NGC 497 (SDSS)

Observation data (J2000.0 epoch)
- Constellation: Cetus
- Right ascension: 01^{h} 22^{m} 23.76^{s}
- Declination: −00° 52′ 30.75″
- Redshift: 0.027155
- Heliocentric radial velocity: 8141 ± 3 km/s
- Distance: 336 Mly
- Apparent magnitude (V): 13.00
- Apparent magnitude (B): 13.80

Characteristics
- Type: SBbc
- Apparent size (V): 2.03 x 0.79

Other designations
- PGC 4992, MCG 0-4-100, UGC 915, Arp 8

NGC 497 is a barred spiral galaxy approximately 336 million light-years away from Earth in the constellation of Cetus. It was discovered by French astronomer Édouard Stephan on November 6, 1882.

NGC 497 was imaged by Halton Arp and included in his Atlas of Peculiar Galaxies as Arp 8, under the category of 'split arm' galaxies.

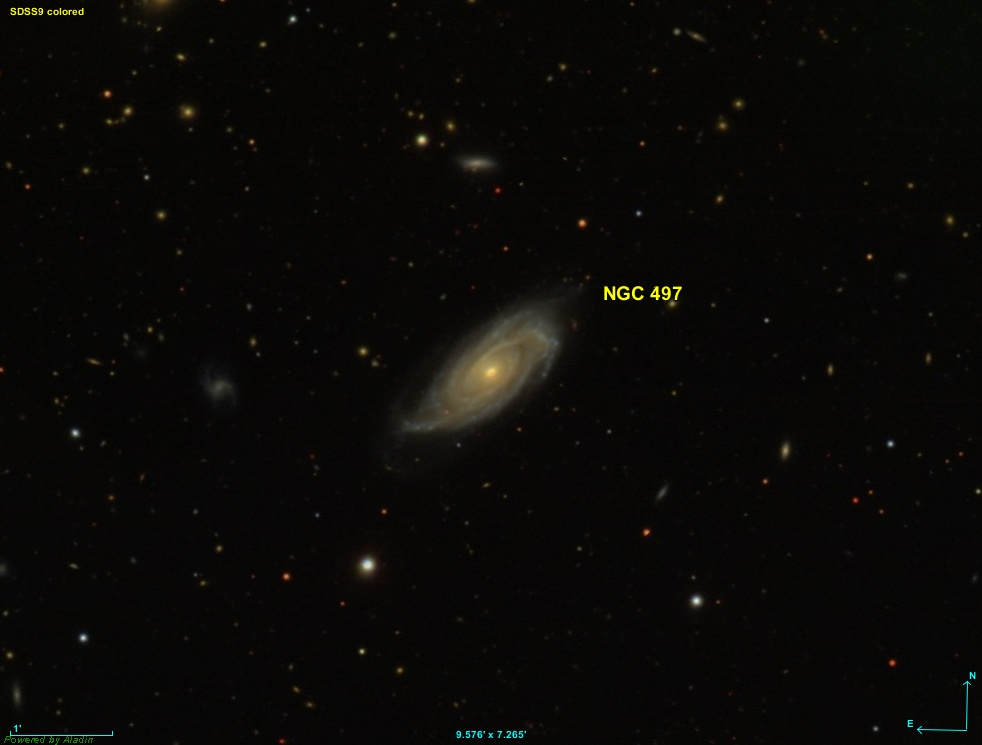
NGC 497 (SDSS)

== See also ==
- List of NGC objects (1–1000)
