= UGC 1775 =

Galaxy in the constellation Cetus

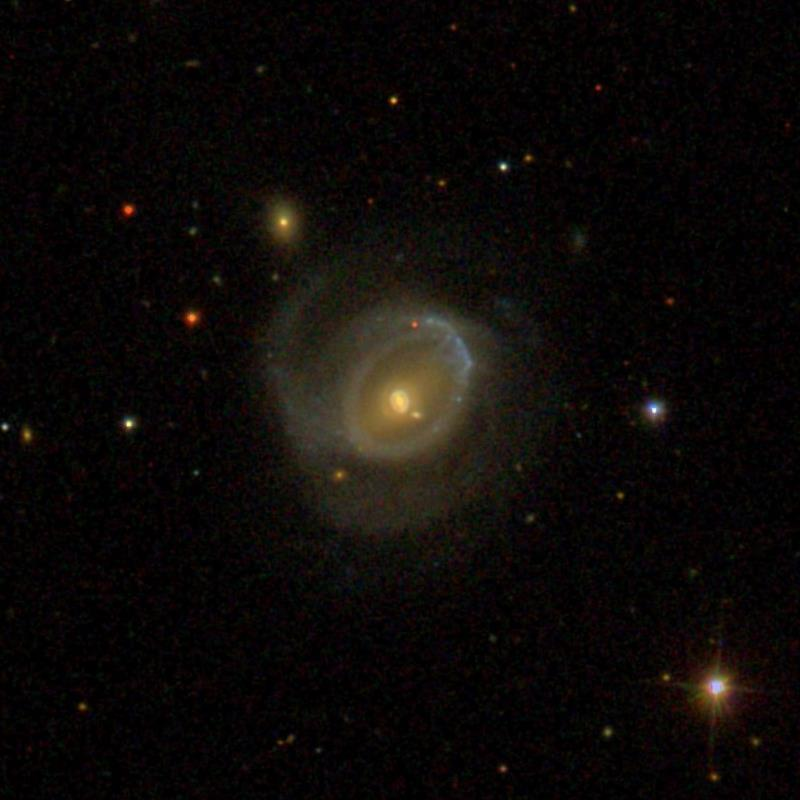
- UGC 1775 imaged by the Sloan Digital Sky Survey

Observation data (J2000 epoch)
- Constellation: Cetus
- Right ascension: 02^{h} 18^{m} 26.3964^{s}
- Declination: +05° 39′ 14.012″
- Redshift: 0.030381 ± 0.000002
- Heliocentric radial velocity: 9,108 ± 1 km/s
- Distance: 395 ± 28 Mly (121 ± 8.5 Mpc)
- Apparent magnitude (V): 13.8

Characteristics
- Type: S?
- Size: ~235,600 ly (72.24 kpc) (estimated)
- Apparent size (V): 1.5′ × 1.5′
- Notable features: Collisional ring

Other designations
- IRAS 02158+0525, Arp 10, MCG +01-06-062, PGC 8802, CGCG 413-069, VV 362

UGC 1775 or Arp 10 is a ring galaxy in the constellation Cetus. The galaxy lies about 400 million light years away from Earth, which means, given its apparent dimensions, that UGC 1775 is approximately 220,000 light years across. The earliest known reference to this galaxy comes from part 3 of the Morphological Catalogue of Galaxies, published in 1963, where it is listed as MCG +01-06-062. The galaxy is included in Halton Arp's Atlas of Peculiar Galaxies in the galaxies with split arms category.

== Characteristics ==
The galaxy features a bright ring with a faint bar. Its nucleus is off-centre and it is surrounded by a bright ring of HII regions where new stars are formed. One fainter outer ring or shell also hosts a faint arc of HII regions. The hydrogen emission of the galaxy shows a large disturbed hydrogen disk extending for 2.7 times the optical diameter of the galaxy and features shells. The galaxy has a high star formation rate, which was estimated based on the H-alpha emission to be 5.4 M_{☉} per year, while based on the infrared luminosity, it is 11.2 M_{☉} per year. The mid-infrared emission is associated with the nucleus and the star forming regions of the ring.

The ring is considered to have been created by another galaxy passing through the disk of the galaxy near its centre about 85 million years ago. As there are no similar mass galaxies visible in the vicinity of UGC 1775 it has been proposed that the non-linear kinematics of the gas in the galaxy are the result of the accretion of a smaller galaxy by a gas-rich spiral galaxy. However more detailed observations indicate that the smaller galaxy is visible as a knot next to the nucleus of the main galaxy. Another small galaxy lying along the minor axis of the galaxy is a background object.

The galaxy is seen nearly face-on, at an inclination of 22 degrees.

== Supernova ==
One supernova has been observed in UGC 1775. SN 2000dx was a type Ia supernova discovered by the Lick Observatory Supernova Search (LOSS) on 30 October 2000 with an apparent magnitude of 17.3. The supernova was a few days before maximum brightness, located 7.9" east and 12.3" south of the nucleus of UGC 1775.
