= HII galaxy =

Galaxy spectroscopically similar to HII region

An HII galaxy is a very luminous dwarf starburst galaxy. Generally, HII galaxies have a low metallicity and high percentage of neutral hydrogen. There is generally believed to be a relationship between luminosity and disturbed morphology, suggesting that the starburst activity in the galaxy is caused by tidal interactions. The distribution of luminosities tends to cluster around two different extremes: those with a high luminosity and highly disturbed morphology, and those with a low luminosity and fairly regular and symmetric morphology. Those with high luminosities are labelled by some as type I HII galaxies and those with lower luminosities as type II HII galaxies. There is also a general correlation between metallicity and mass of the galaxies. The name of HII galaxies comes from their spectroscopic properties which are more or less indistinguishable from that of HII regions.
