= NGC 702 =

Galaxy in the constellation Cetus

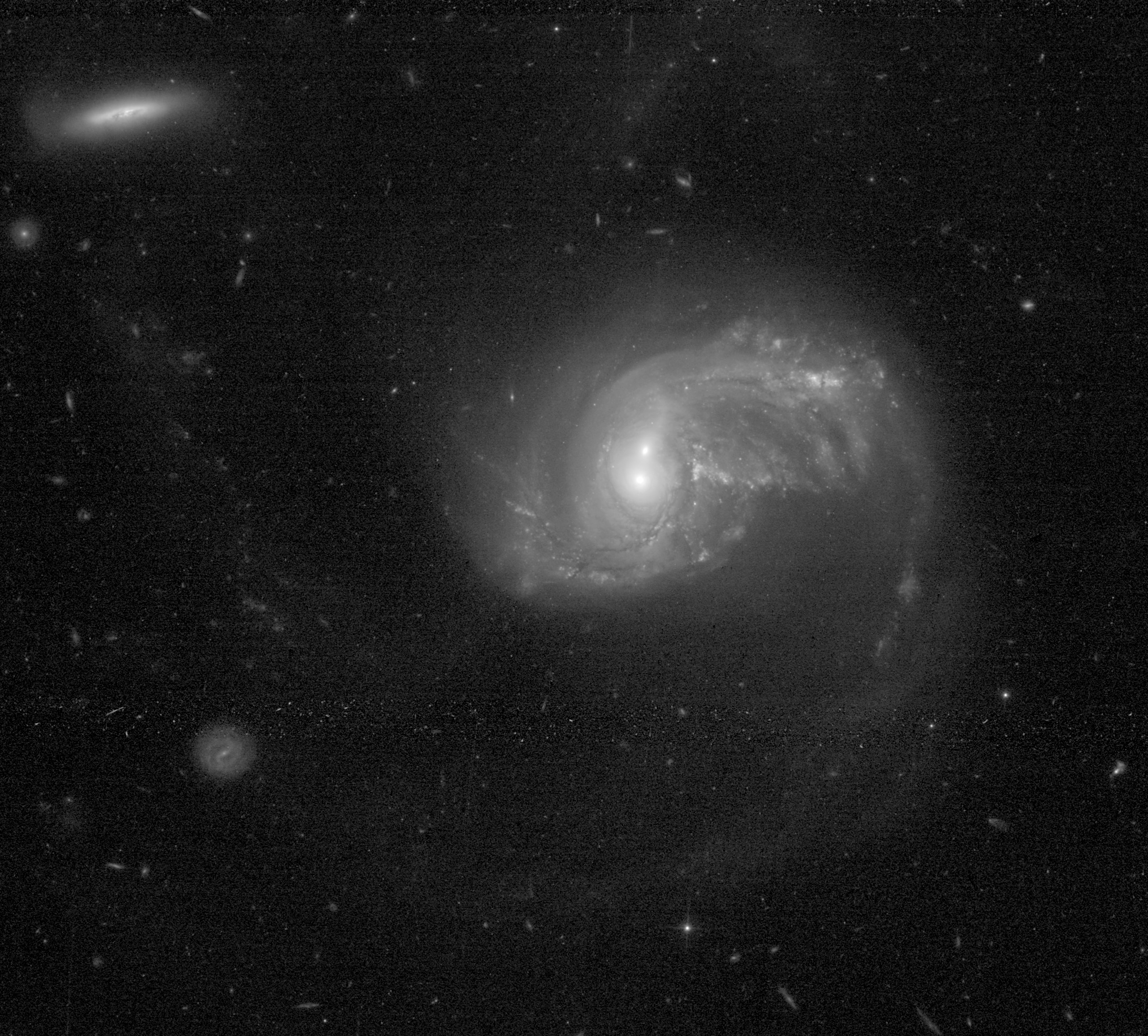

NGC 702 is a spiral galaxy located in the constellation Cetus. It was discovered by the astronomer William Herschel on September 20, 1784. It is located about 495 million light-years away.
