= NGC 145 =

Spiral galaxy in the constellation Cetus

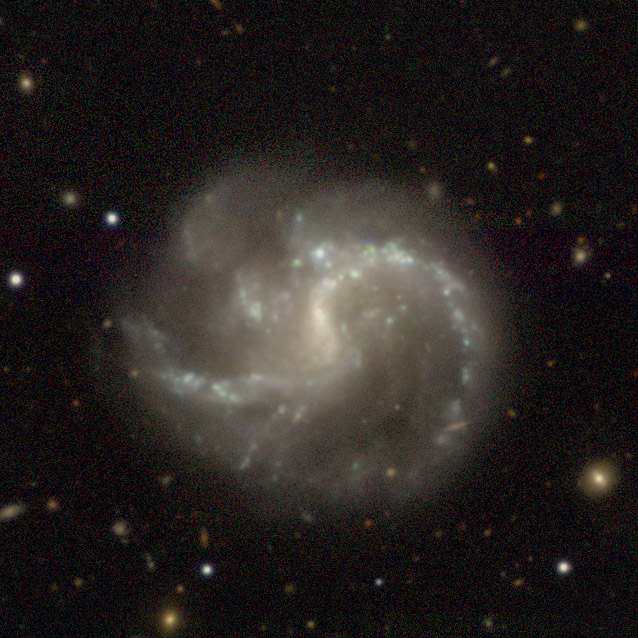
- DECam image of NGC 145

Observation data (J2000 epoch)
- Constellation: Cetus
- Right ascension: 00^{h} 31^{m} 7^{s}
- Declination: +28° 28′ 22″
- Redshift: 0.013804
- Heliocentric radial velocity: 4138 ± 5 km/s
- Distance: 44 ± 6.8 Mly (13.5 ± 2.1 Mpc)

Characteristics
- Type: SB(s)dm
- Apparent size (V): 1.8 x 1.3
- Notable features: Three well-defined arms.

Other designations
- h 27, h 2328, GC 70, IRAS 00292-0525, Arp 19, LEDA 1941, MCG -1-2-27, PGC 1941

NGC 145, also known as Arp 19, is a barred spiral galaxy in Cetus, notable for its three spiral arms.
