= M109 Group =

Galaxy group in the constellation Ursa Major

Observation data (Epoch J2000)
- Constellation: Ursa Major
- Right ascension: 11^{h} 55^{m}
- Declination: +51° 20′
- Brightest member: Messier 109
- Number of galaxies: 41–58

Other designations
- NGC 3992 Group, LGG 258, NOGG H 547, NOGG P1 588, NOGG P2 597

The M109 Group (also known as the NGC 3992 Group or Ursa Major cloud) is a group of galaxies about 55 million light-years away in the constellation Ursa Major. The group is named after the brightest galaxy within the group, the spiral galaxy M109.

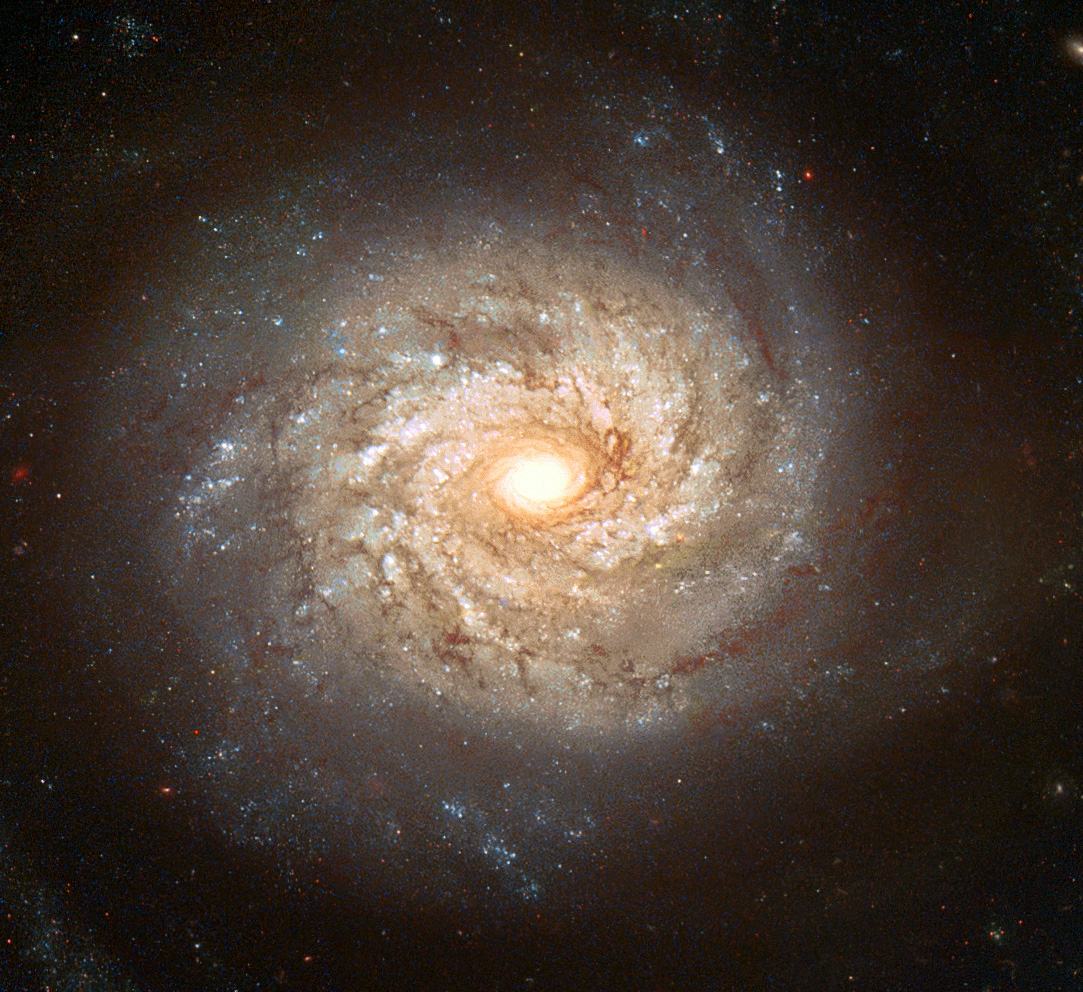
NGC 3982.

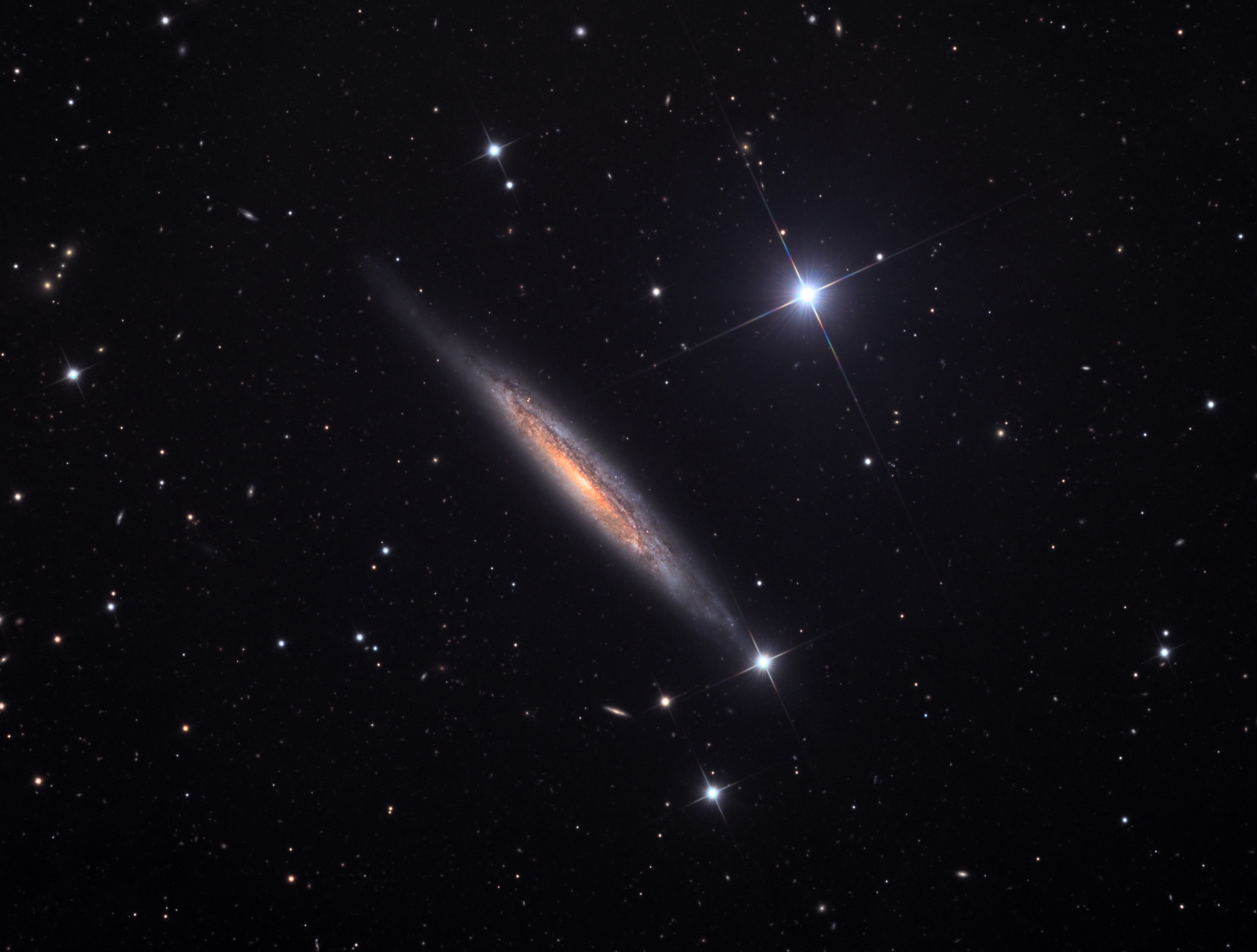
NGC 4157, seen by the 32 inch Schulman Foundation telescope on Mt. Lemmon, USA.

== Members ==
The table below lists galaxies that have been consistently identified as group members in the Nearby Galaxies Catalog, the survey of Fouque et al., the Lyons Groups of Galaxies (LGG) Catalogue, and the three group lists created from the Nearby Optical Galaxy sample of Giuricin et al.

Members of the M109 Group
| Name | Type | R.A. (J2000) | Dec. (J2000) | Redshift (km/s) | Apparent Magnitude |
|---|---|---|---|---|---|
| Messier 109 | SB(rs)bc | 11^{h} 57^{m} 36.0^{s} | +53° 22′ 28″ | 1048 ± 1 | 10.6 |
| NGC 3718 | SB(s)a pec | 11^{h} 32^{m} 34.9^{s} | +53° 04′ 05″ | 993 ± 1 | 11.6 |
| NGC 3726 | SAB(r)c | 11^{h} 33^{m} 21.2^{s} | +47° 01′ 45″ | 866 ± 1 | 10.9 |
| NGC 3729 | SB(r)a pec | 11^{h} 33^{m} 49.3^{s} | +53° 07′ 32″ | 1060 ± 1 | 12.0 |
| NGC 3769 | SB(r)b | 11^{h} 37^{m} 44.1^{s} | +47° 53′ 35″ | 737 ± 2 | 12.5 |
| NGC 3782 | SAB(s)cd | 11^{h} 39^{m} 20.7^{s} | +46° 30′ 48″ | 739 ± 6 | 13.1 |
| NGC 3870 | S0 | 11^{h} 45^{m} 56.6^{s} | +50° 11′ 59″ | 756 ± 7 | 13.4 |
| NGC 3877 | Sc | 11^{h} 46^{m} 07.8^{s} | +47° 29′ 41″ | 895 ± 4 | 12.1 |
| NGC 3893 | SAB(rs)c | 11^{h} 48^{m} 38.2^{s} | +48° 42′ 39″ | 967 ± 1 | 11.2 |
| NGC 3913 | (R)SA(rs)d | 11^{h} 50^{m} 38.9^{s} | +55° 21′ 14″ | 954 ± 4 | 13.2 |
| NGC 3917 | SAcd | 11^{h} 50^{m} 45.5^{s} | +51° 49′ 27″ | 965 ± 1 | 12.5 |
| NGC 3922 | S0/a | 11^{h} 51^{m} 13.4^{s} | +50° 09′ 25″ | 906 ± 7 | 13.4 |
| NGC 3928 | SA(s)b | 11^{h} 51^{m} 47.6^{s} | +48° 40′ 59″ | 988 ± 4 | 13.0 |
| NGC 3949 | SA(s)bc | 11^{h} 53^{m} 41.4^{s} | +47° 51′ 32″ | 800 ± 1 | 11.5 |
| NGC 3953 | SB(r)bc | 11^{h} 53^{m} 48.9^{s} | +52° 19′ 36″ | 1052 ± 2 | 10.8 |
| NGC 3972 | SA(s)bc | 11^{h} 55^{m} 45.1^{s} | +55° 19′ 15″ | 852 ± 1 | 13.1 |
| NGC 3982 | SAB(r)b | 11^{h} 56^{m} 28.1^{s} | +55° 07′ 31″ | 1109 ± 6 | 12.0 |
| NGC 4010 | SB(s)d | 11^{h} 58^{m} 37.9^{s} | +47° 15′ 41″ | 902 ± 1 | 13.2 |
| NGC 4026 | S0 | 11^{h} 59^{m} 25.2^{s} | +50° 57′ 42″ | 930 ± 40 | 11.7 |
| NGC 4085 | SAB(s)c | 12^{h} 05^{m} 22.7^{s} | +50° 21′ 10″ | 746 ± 5 | 13.0 |
| NGC 4088 | SAB(rs)bc | 12^{h} 05^{m} 34.2^{s} | +50° 32′ 21″ | 757 ± 1 | 11.2 |
| NGC 4100 | (R)SA(rs)bc | 12^{h} 06^{m} 08.1^{s} | +49° 34′ 59″ | 1074 ± 1 | 11.9 |
| NGC 4102 | SAB(s)b | 12^{h} 06^{m} 23.1^{s} | +52° 42′ 39″ | 846 ± 2 | 12.0 |
| NGC 4142 | SB(s)d | 12^{h} 09^{m} 30.2^{s} | +53° 06′ 18″ | 1157 ± 7 | 13.9 |
| NGC 4157 | SAB(s)b | 12^{h} 11^{m} 04.4^{s} | +50° 29′ 05″ | 774 ± 2 | 12.2 |
| UGC 6628 | SAm | 11^{h} 40^{m} 06.7^{s} | +45° 56′ 34″ | 841 ± 1 | 13.2 |
| UGC 6667 | Scd | 11^{h} 42^{m} 26.3^{s} | +51° 35′ 53″ | 973 ± 1 | 14.2 |
| UGC 6840 | SB(rs)m | 11^{h} 52^{m} 07.0^{s} | +52° 06′ 29″ | 1046 ± 5 | 14.3 |
| UGC 6917 | SBm | 11^{h} 56^{m} 28.8^{s} | +50° 25′ 42″ | 911 ± 1 | 13.1 |
| UGC 6923 | Im | 11^{h} 56^{m} 49.4^{s} | +53° 09′ 37″ | 1066 ± 2 | 15.1 |
| UGC 6930 | SAB(s)d | 11^{h} 57^{m} 17.3^{s} | +49° 16′ 59″ | 777 ± 0 | 12.7 |
| UGC 6983 | SB(rs)cd | 11^{h} 59^{m} 09.3^{s} | +52° 42′ 27″ | 1082 ± 1 | 13.1 |
| UGC 7218 | Im | 12^{h} 12^{m} 56.5^{s} | +52° 15′ 55″ | 770 ± 7 | 14.8 |

Galaxies frequently but not consistently listed as group members in the above references (i.e. galaxies listed in four of the above lists) include NGC 3631, NGC 3657, NGC 3733, NGC 3756, NGC 3850, NGC 3898, NGC 3985, NGC 3990, NGC 3998, NGC 4217, NGC 4220, UGC 6773, UGC 6802, UGC 6816, UGC 6922, and UGC 6969. The exact membership and the exact number of galaxies in the group is somewhat uncertain.

Fouque et al. lists these galaxies as two separate groups named Ursa Major I North and Ursa Major I South, both of which were used to compile the above table. Most other references, however, identify this as a single group, as is specifically noted in the LGG Catalogue.
