= NGC 3756 =

Galaxy in the constellation Ursa Major

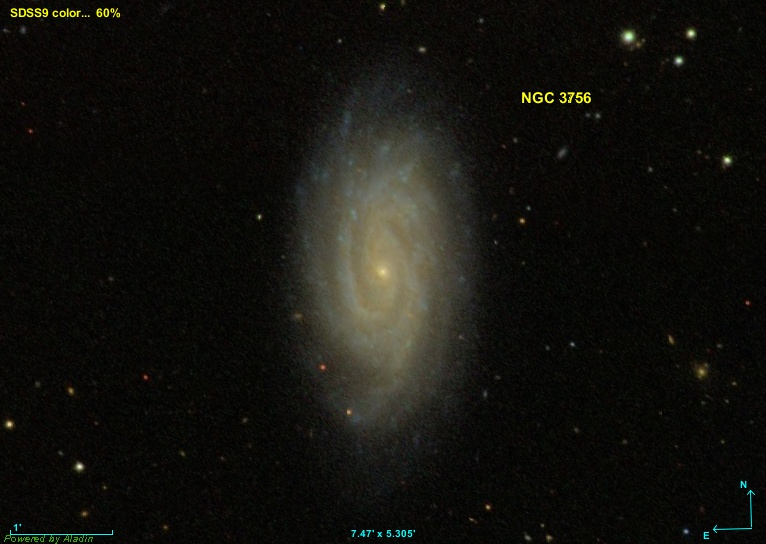
- NGC 3756 imaged by SDSS

Observation data (J2000 epoch)
- Constellation: Ursa Major
- Right ascension: 11^{h} 36^{m} 48.0146^{s}
- Declination: +54° 17′ 36.930″
- Redshift: 0.004300±0.00000500
- Heliocentric radial velocity: 1,289±1 km/s
- Distance: 63.45 ± 2.22 Mly (19.454 ± 0.682 Mpc)
- Group or cluster: NGC 3898 group (LGG 250)
- Apparent magnitude (V): 12.11

Characteristics
- Type: SAB(rs)bc
- Size: ~92,300 ly (28.29 kpc) (estimated)
- Apparent size (V): 4.2′ × 2.1′

Other designations
- IRAS 11340+5434, 2MASX J11364797+5417372, UGC 6579, MCG +09-19-134, PGC 35931, CGCG 268-063

NGC 3756 is an intermediate spiral galaxy in the constellation of Ursa Major. Its velocity with respect to the cosmic microwave background is 1,466±12 km/s, which corresponds to a Hubble distance of 70.5 ± 5.0 Mly (21.62 ± 1.53 Mpc). Additionally, 28 non-redshift measurements give a similar mean distance of 63.45 ± 2.22 Mly (19.454 ± 0.682 Mpc). It was discovered by German-British astronomer William Herschel on 14 April 1789.

NGC 3756 has a possible active galactic nucleus, i.e. it has a compact region at the center of a galaxy that emits a significant amount of energy across the electromagnetic spectrum, with characteristics indicating that this luminosity is not produced by the stars.

== NGC 3898 group ==
NGC 3756 is a member of the NGC 3898 group (also known as LGG 250), which contains at least nine galaxies. The other members of the group are NGC 3733, NGC 3794, NGC 3846, NGC 3846A, NGC 3850, NGC 3898, NGC 3982, and UGC 6894.

== Supernova ==
One supernova has been observed in NGC 3756:

- SN 1975T (type unknown, mag. 17.5) was discovered by Swiss astronomer Paul Wild on 28 December 1975. It reached maximum brightness (mag. 15.7) around 11 January 1976, and although never officially classified, its light curve suggested that it was a Type II supernova.

== Image gallery ==
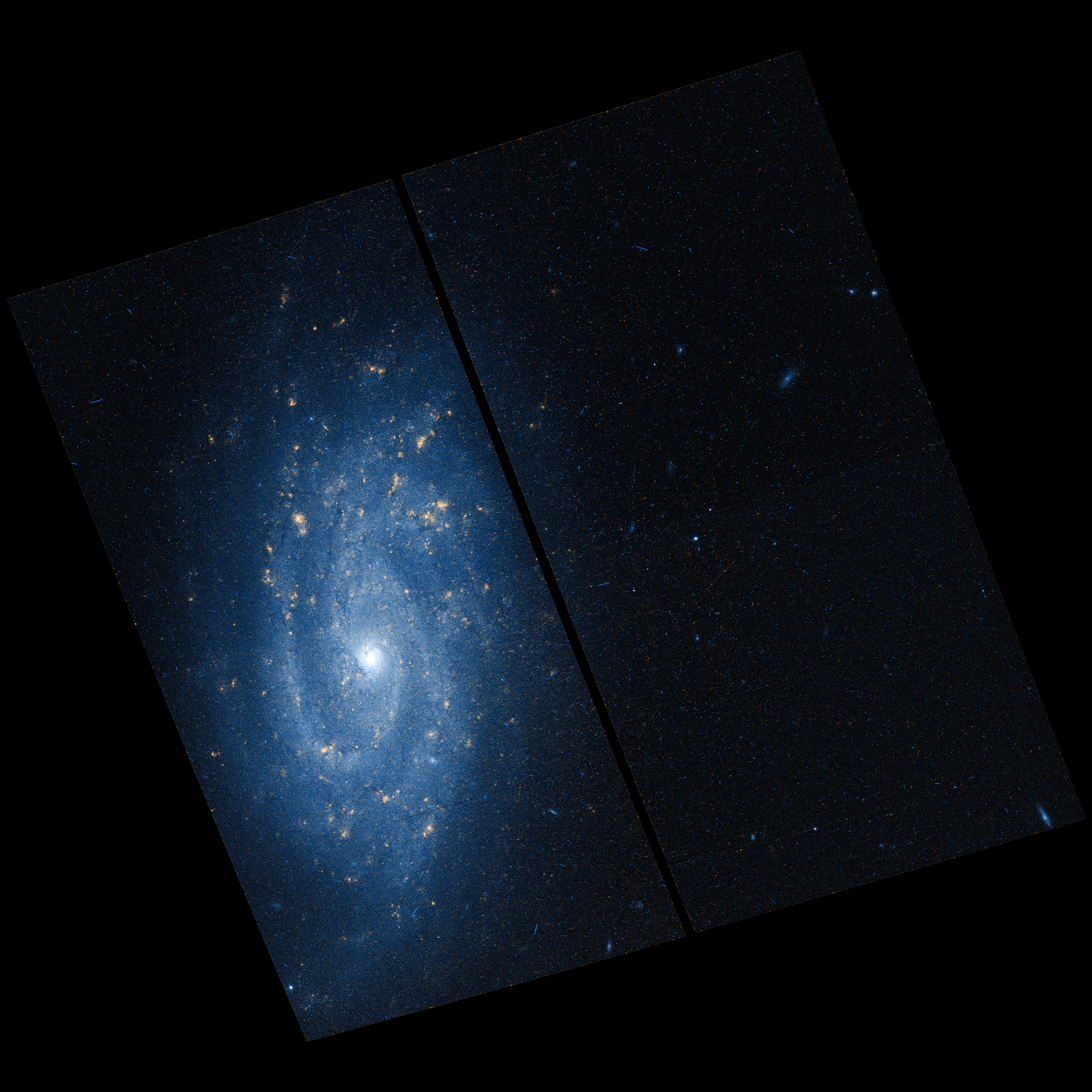
NGC 3756 imaged by the Hubble Space Telescope

== See also ==
- List of NGC objects (3001–4000)
