= NGC 3733 =

Galaxy in the constellation Ursa Major

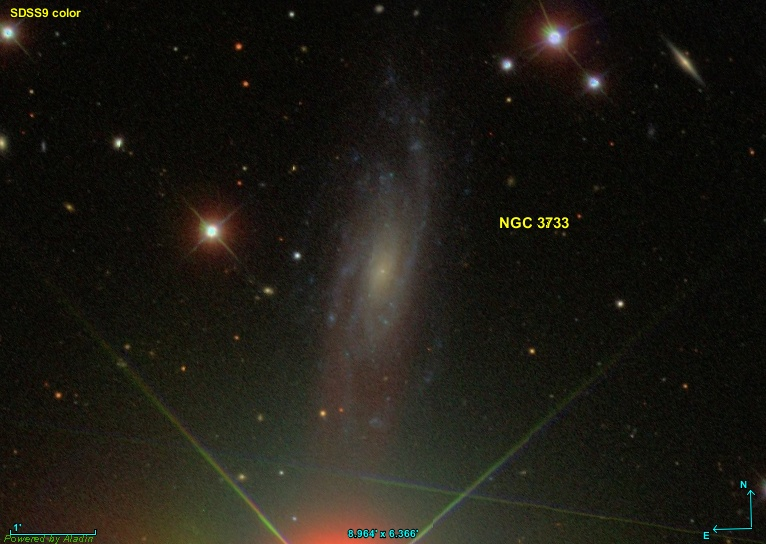
- NGC 3733 imaged by SDSS. The glare below comes from the nearby star HD 100615.

Observation data (J2000 epoch)
- Constellation: Ursa Major
- Right ascension: 11^{h} 35^{m} 01.6481^{s}
- Declination: +54° 51′ 02.122″
- Redshift: 0.003949±0.00000200
- Heliocentric radial velocity: 1,184±1 km/s
- Distance: 73.66 ± 6.46 Mly (22.583 ± 1.981 Mpc)
- Group or cluster: NGC 3898 group (LGG 250)
- Apparent magnitude (V): 12.93

Characteristics
- Type: SAB(s)cd
- Size: ~107,100 ly (32.85 kpc) (estimated)
- Apparent size (V): 4.8′ × 2.2′

Other designations
- IRAS F11322+5507, 2MASX J11350158+5451018, UGC 6554, MCG +09-19-123, PGC 35797, CGCG 268-055, VV 459

NGC 3733 is an intermediate spiral galaxy in the constellation of Ursa Major. Its velocity with respect to the cosmic microwave background is 1,358±12 km/s, which corresponds to a Hubble distance of 65.3 ± 4.6 Mly (20.03 ± 1.41 Mpc). Additionally, nine non-redshift measurements give a farther mean distance of 73.66 ± 6.46 Mly (22.583 ± 1.981 Mpc). It was discovered by German-British astronomer William Herschel on 14 April 1789.

NGC 3733 has a possible active galactic nucleus, i.e. it has a compact region at the center of a galaxy that emits a significant amount of energy across the electromagnetic spectrum, with characteristics indicating that this luminosity is not produced by the stars.

== NGC 3898 group ==
According to A. M. Garcia, NGC 3733 is part of the NGC 3898 group (also known as LGG 250). This galaxy group has nine members, including NGC 3756, NGC 3794, NGC 3846, NGC 3846A, NGC 3850, NGC 3898, NGC 3982, and UGC 6894.

== Supernova ==
One supernova has been observed in NGC 3733:

- SN 1980D (Type II, mag. 15) was discovered by Swiss Astronomer Paul Wild on 17 March 1980. It was initially classified as Type I, but later analysis concluded it was more likely of Type II.

== See also ==
- List of NGC objects (3001–4000)
