= NGC 4157 =

Spiral galaxy in the constellation Ursa Major

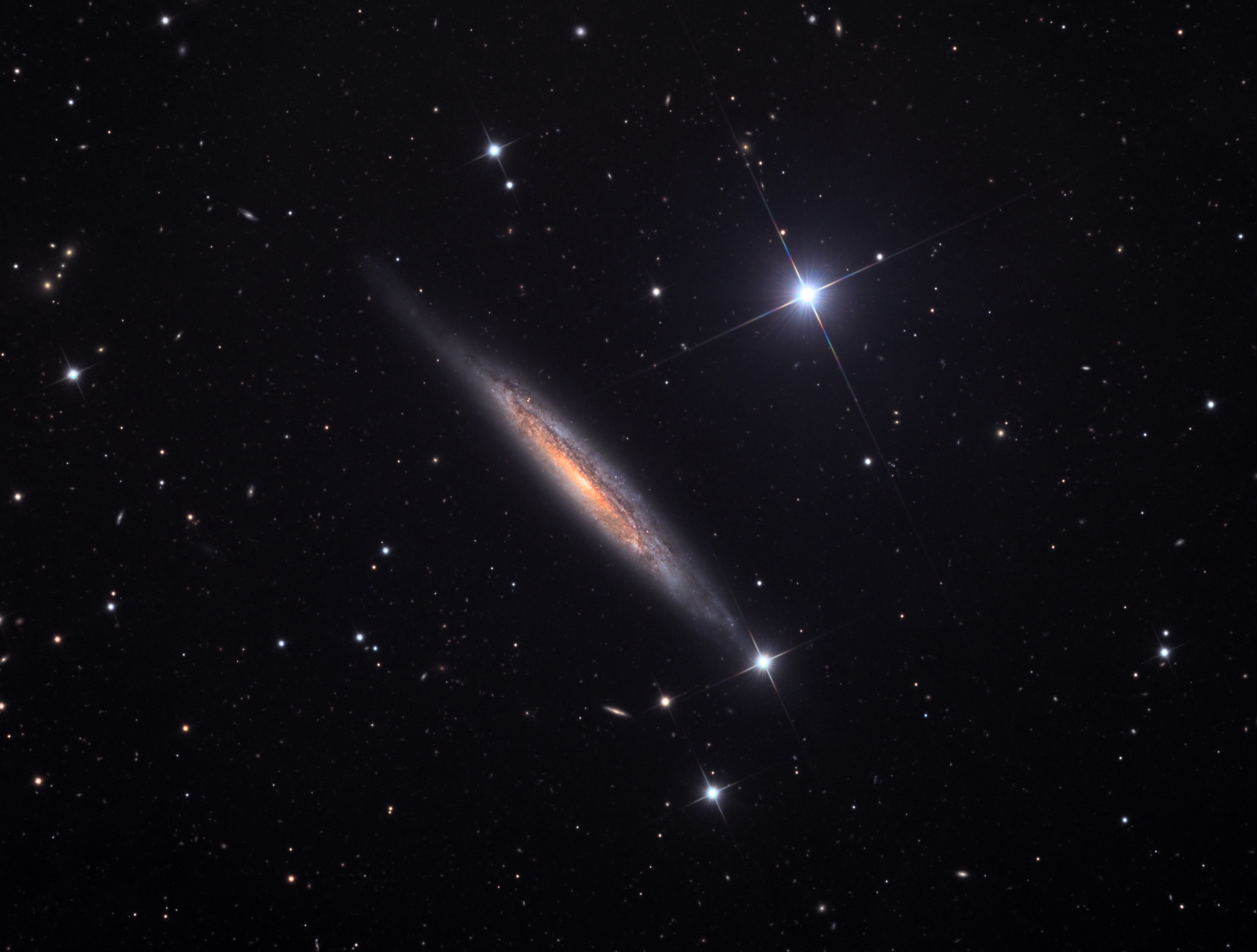
- NGC 4157 and superimposed bright star SAO 28277

Observation data (J2000 epoch)
- Constellation: Ursa Major
- Right ascension: 12^{h} 11^{m} 04.4^{s}
- Declination: +50° 29′ 05″
- Redshift: 0.002572±0.000005
- Heliocentric radial velocity: 771±1 km/s
- Distance: 55.8 ± 10 Mly (17.1 ± 3.1 Mpc)
- Apparent magnitude (V): 11.3

Characteristics
- Type: SAB(s)b?
- Apparent size (V): 6.7′ × 1.2′
- Notable features: Edge-on galaxy

Other designations
- IRAS 12085+5045, NGC 4157, UGC 7183, MCG +09-20-106, PGC 38795, CGCG 269-038, 6C B120833.1+504537

NGC 4157 is a barred spiral galaxy in the constellation Ursa Major. The galaxy lies about 55 million light years away from Earth, which means, given its apparent dimensions, that NGC 4157 is approximately 125,000 light years across. It was discovered by William Herschel on March 9, 1788.

== Characteristics ==
NGC 4157 seen nearly edge-on, with an inclination of 84° based on CO imaging. The total stellar mass of NGC 4157 is (2.92±0.04)×10^{10} M_{☉}, while the dust mass is estimated to be 2.1×10^{7} M_{☉}. The hydrogen disk of NGC 4157 is symmetric and slightly wrapped, indicating no strong interaction with other galaxies, and extends to twice the size of the optical disk. The total HI mass in the galaxy is estimated to be 10^{9.72} M_{☉}.

The star formation rate of the galaxy is 1.76±0.18 M_{☉} per year. A star formation area is visible beyond the end of the optical disk and is also visible in X-ray and ultraviolet imaging. It could probably be the result of a recent accretion.

The galaxy has radio emission extending above and below the optical disk, indicating the presence of a radio halo. There is also radio emission extending southwards from the north-eastern end of the disk.

=== Supernovae ===
Three supernovae have been observed in NGC 4157:

- SN 1937A (type unknown, mag. 16.2) was discovered by Fritz Zwicky on 16 February 1937.
- SN 1955A (type unknown, mag. 16) was discovered by Fritz Zwicky on 14 April 1955.
- SN 2003J (Type II, mag. 16.7) was discovered by R. Kushida, Tim Puckett, and Jack Newton on 11 January 2003.

== Nearby galaxies ==
NGC 4157 is the foremost galaxy of the NGC 4157 Group. Other members of the group include NGC 4085, NGC 4088, UGC 6992, and UGC 7176. UGC 7176 is a companion of NGC 4157, lying 12 arcminutes away. The group is part of the Ursa Major Cluster, a large association of mostly spiral galaxies lying north of the Virgo Cluster, that is part of the Local Supercluster. NGC 4157 is one of the dominant galaxies in the cluster, along with NGC 3769, NGC 3877, NGC 3992, NGC 4111, NGC 4217 and NGC 4346.
