= NGC 1320 =

Spiral galaxy in the constellation Eridanus

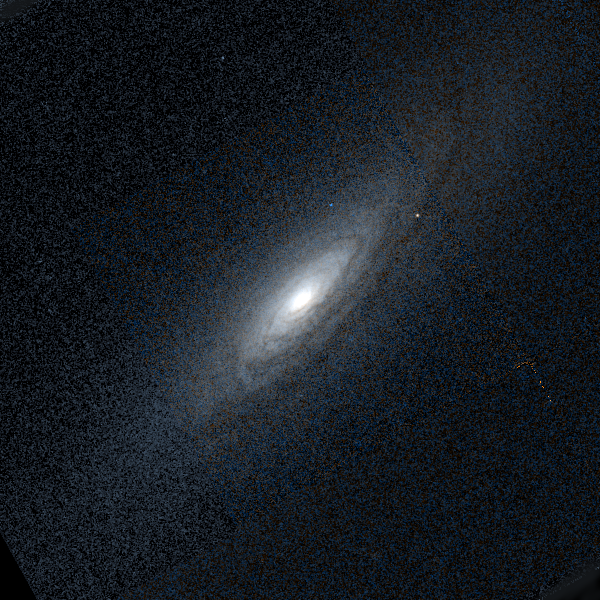
- NGC 1320, as seen by the Hubble Space Telescope)

Observation data (J2000 epoch)
- Constellation: Eridanus
- Right ascension: 03h 24m 48s
- Declination: -03° 02′ 31″
- Redshift: 0.009283
- Heliocentric radial velocity: 2,783 km/s
- Distance: 126 Mly (38.6 Mpc)
- Apparent magnitude (V): 14
- Apparent magnitude (B): 14
- Surface brightness: 23.01 mag/arcsec2

Characteristics
- Type: SAa
- Size: 68,100 ly

Other designations
- Mrk 607, PGC 12756, KUG 0322-032, IRAS 03222-0313, MCG -01-09-036

NGC 1320 is a spiral galaxy located in the constellation Eridanus. Its speed relative to the cosmic microwave background is 2,620 ± 15 km/s, which corresponds to a Hubble distance of 38.6 ± 2.7 Mpc (~126 million ly). It was discovered by the German-British astronomer William Herschel in 1784.

The luminosity class of NGC 1320 is I and it is an active Seyfert 2 galaxy. NGC 1320 is a galaxy whose core shines in the ultraviolet region. It is listed in the Markarian catalog under the symbol Mrk 607 (MK 607).

To date, a non-redshift-based measurement gives a distance of approximately 37,700 Mpc (~123 million ly). This value is within the Hubble distance values.

== Supermassive black hole ==
According to the authors of a paper published in 2002, the mass of the central black hole of NGC 1320 is 1.51 x 107 M_{☉}. A study carried out in 2007 on 90 Seyfert 2 type galaxies using velocity dispersion made it possible to estimate the mass of their central supermassive black holes. For NGC 1320, the mass of the black hole is 15 ×106 𝑀⊙.

According to another study published in 2012 and based on the dispersion of the velocities of the central region of NGC 3982, the mass of the central black hole would be 19.5 million 𝑀⊙.

== Supernova ==
One supernova has been observed in NGC 1320: SN 1994aa (type Ia, mag. 17) was discovered by the Scottish-Australian astronomer Robert H. McNaught on 11 September 1994.

== See also ==
- List of spiral galaxies
- List of NGC objects (1001–2000)
