= Phecda =

Star in the constellation Ursa Major

- Location of Phecda (circled in red)

Observation data Epoch J2000 Equinox ICRS
- Constellation: Ursa Major
- Right ascension: 11^{h} 53^{m} 49.84732^{s}
- Declination: +53° 41′ 41.1350″
- Apparent magnitude (V): 2.438

Characteristics
- Spectral type: A0 Ve + K2 V
- U−B color index: +0.008
- B−V color index: –0.013

Astrometry
Radial velocity (R_{v})	−12.6 km/s
Proper motion (μ)	RA: +107.68 mas/yr Dec.: +11.01 mas/yr
Parallax (π)	39.21±0.40 mas
Distance	83.2 ± 0.8 ly (25.5 ± 0.3 pc)
Absolute magnitude (M_{V})	0.4

Orbit
Period (P)	20.5 ± 1 yr
Semi-major axis (a)	0.460″
Eccentricity (e)	0.3 ± 0.3
Inclination (i)	51 ± 15°
Longitude of the node (Ω)	6 ± 61°
Periastron epoch (T)	B 1984.0 ± 2.0
Argument of periastron (ω) (secondary)	185 ± 37°

Details

γ UMa A
Mass	2.412+0.053 −0.060 M_{☉}
Radius	3.385 (equatorial); 2.186 (polar) R_{☉}
Luminosity	44.57+3.39 −3.61 L_{☉}
Surface gravity (log g)	3.79 cgs
Temperature	6,751 (equatorial); 10,520 (polar) K
Rotational velocity (v sin i)	184.5+32.6 −35.6 km/s
Age	333+43 −83 Myr

γ UMa B
Mass	0.79 M_{☉}
Radius	0.919 (Note: Calculated, using the Stefan-Boltzmann law and the star's effective temperature and luminosity, with respect to the solar nominal effective temperature of 5,772 K: $$\sqrt{\biggl(\frac{5,772}{4,780}\biggr)^4 \cdot 0.397} = 0.919\ R_\odot.$$) R_{☉}
Luminosity	0.397 L_{☉}
Temperature	4,780 K

Other designations
- Phad, Phecda, Phekda, Phegda, Phekha, Phacd, Fekda, γ Ursae Majoris, γ UMa, Gamma UMa, 64 Ursae Majoris, BD+54 1475, FK5 447, GC 16268, HD 103287, HIP 58001, HR 4554, PPM 33292, SAO 28179.

Database references
SIMBAD	data

Phecda /ˈfɛkdə/, also called Gamma Ursae Majoris (γ Ursae Majoris, abbreviated Gamma UMa, γ UMa), is a star in the constellation of Ursa Major. Since 1943, the spectrum of this star has served as one of the stable anchor points by which other stars are classified. Based upon parallax measurements with the Hipparcos astrometry satellite, it is located at a distance of around 83.2 light-years (25.5 parsecs) from the Sun.

It is more familiar to most observers in the Northern Hemisphere as the lower-left star forming the bowl of the Big Dipper, together with Alpha Ursae Majoris (Dubhe, upper-right), Beta Ursae Majoris (Merak, lower-right) and Delta Ursae Majoris (Megrez, upper-left). Along with four other stars in this well-known asterism, Phecda forms a loose association of stars known as the Ursa Major moving group. Like the other stars in the group, it is a main sequence star, as the Sun is, although somewhat hotter, brighter and larger.

Phecda is located in relatively close physical proximity to the prominent Mizar–Alcor star system. The two are separated by an estimated distance of 8.55 ly (2.62 pc); much closer than the two are from the Sun. The star Merak is separated from Phecda by 11.0 ly (3.4 pc).

== Nomenclature ==
γ Ursae Majoris (Latinised to Gamma Ursae Majoris) is the star's Bayer designation.

It bore the traditional names Phecda or Phad, derived from the Arabic phrase فخذ الدب fakhth al-dubb ('thigh of the bear'). In 2016, the International Astronomical Union organized a Working Group on Star Names (WGSN) to catalog and standardize proper names for stars. The WGSN's first bulletin of July 2016 included a table of the first two batches of names approved by the WGSN, which included Phecda for Gamma Ursae Majoris A.

To the Hindus this star was known as Pulastya, one of the seven rishis.

In Chinese, 北斗 (Běi Dǒu), meaning Northern Dipper, refers to an asterism equivalent to the Big Dipper. Consequently, the Chinese name for Gamma Ursae Majoris itself is 北斗三 (Běi Dǒu sān, English: the Third Star of Northern Dipper) and 天璣 (Tiān Jī, English: Star of Celestial Shining Pearl).

== Properties ==
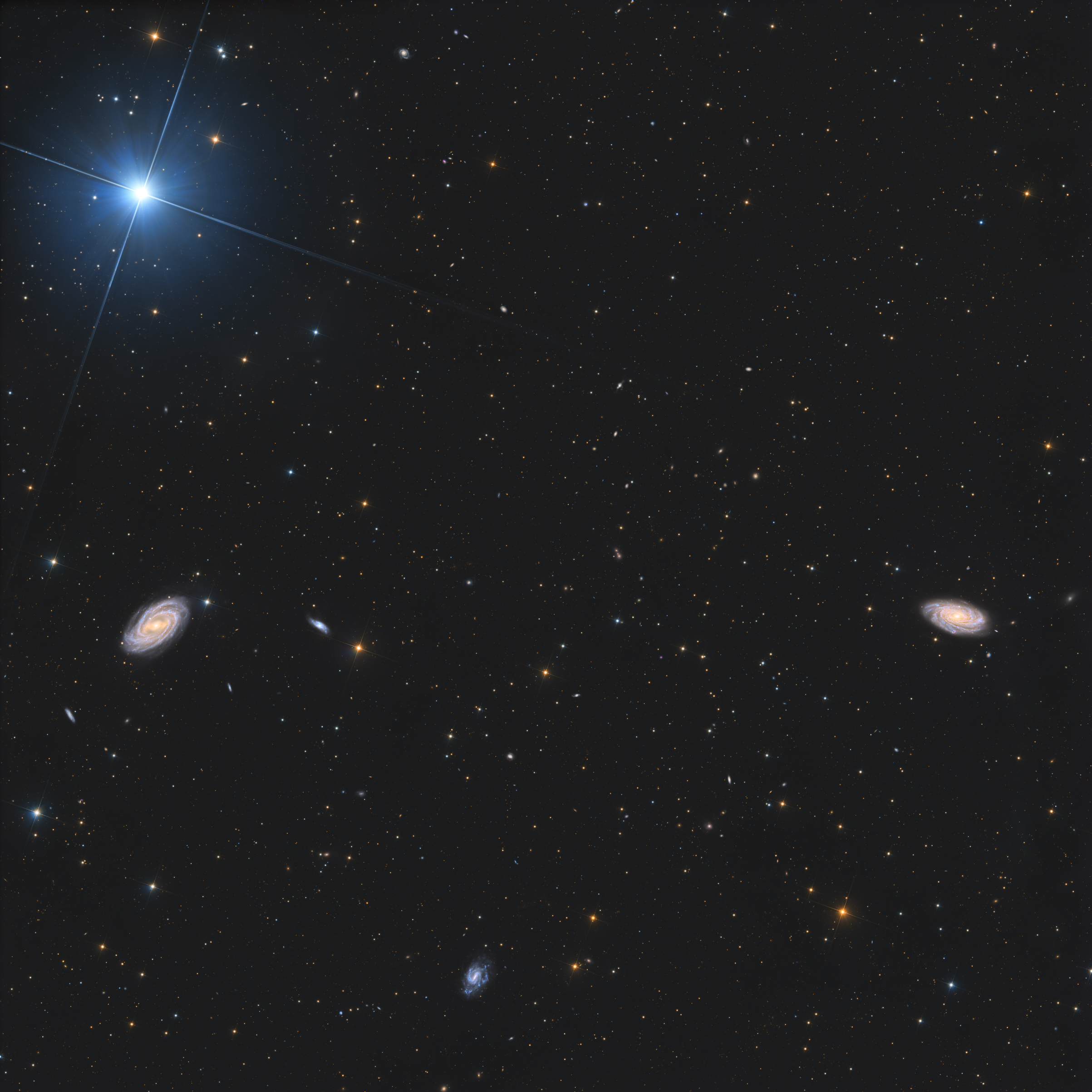
Phecda is the bright star in the top left. Messier 109 is the galaxy in the middle, far left. NGC 3953 is the galaxy in the middle, far right.

Phecda is an Ae star, which is surrounded by an envelope of gas that is adding emission lines to the spectrum of the star; hence the 'e' suffix in the stellar classification of A0 Ve. It is 2.4 times more massive than the Sun and is 333 million years old. It rotates rapidly with a rotational velocity of 386 km/s at its equator, which causes it to have an oblate shape. The equatorial radius measures 3.39 R_{☉}, while the polar radius measures 2.19 R_{☉}. The effective temperature varies as well, from 6,750 K in the equator to 10,520 K in the poles.

Phecda is also an astrometric binary: the companion star regularly perturbs the Ae-type primary star, causing the primary to wobble around the barycenter. From this, an orbital period of 20.5 years has been calculated. The secondary star is a K-type main-sequence star that is 0.79 times as massive as the Sun, and with a surface temperature of 4,780 K.
