= PGC 54493 =

Galaxy in the constellation Serpens

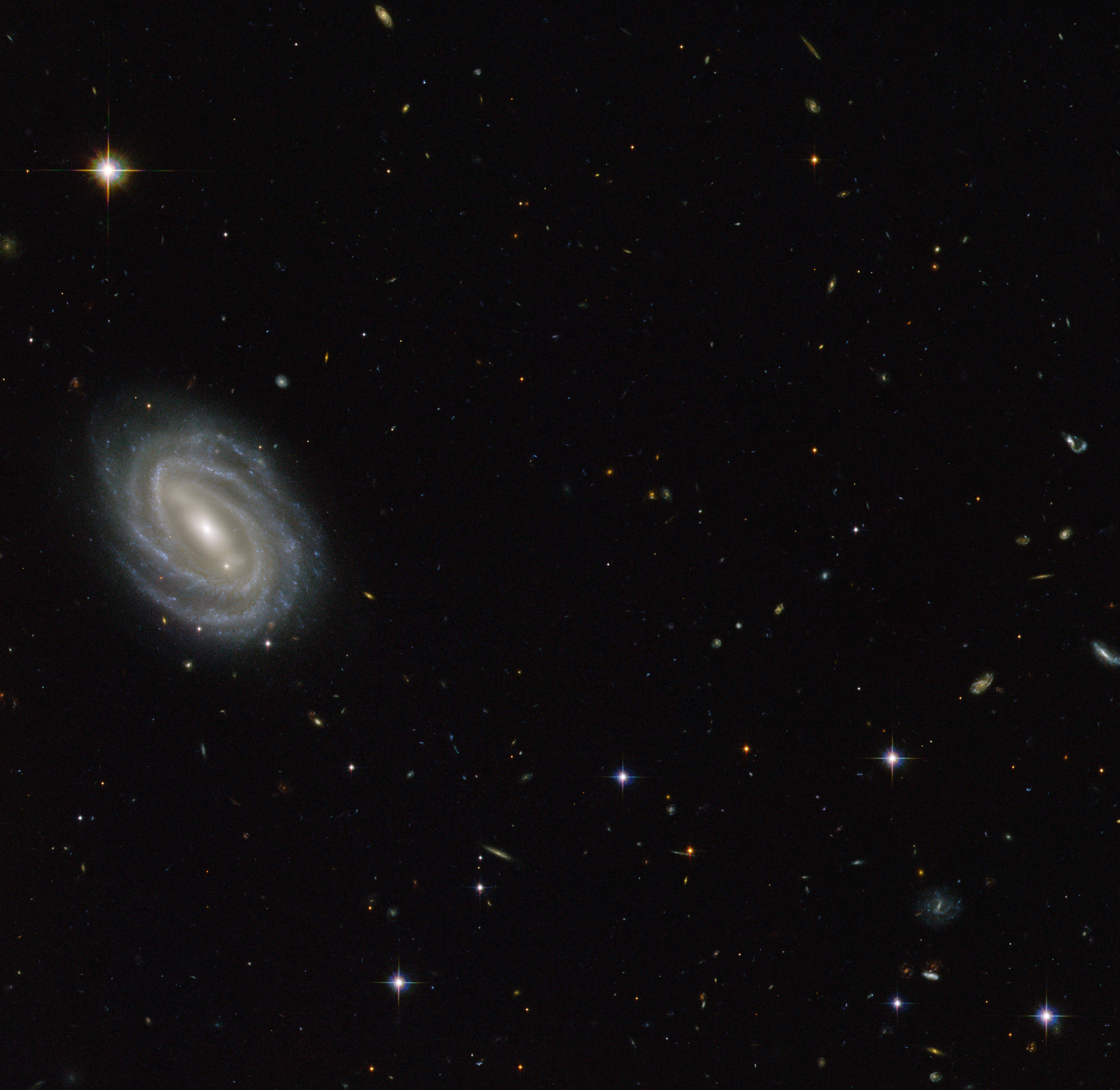
- The spiral galaxy PGC 54493 as imaged by the HST.

Observation data (J2000 epoch)
- Constellation: Serpens
- Right ascension: 15^{h} 16^{m} 19.1^{s}
- Declination: 07° 09′ 44″
- Redshift: 0.035995/10791 km/s
- Distance: 485.7 Mly
- Group or cluster: Abell 2052
- Apparent magnitude (V): 15.1

Characteristics
- Type: SB(rs)bc/S0
- Size: 71.70 kiloparsecs (233,750 Light-Year) (diameter; 25.0 mag/arcsec^{2} B-band isophote)
- Apparent size (V): 0.85 x 0.62

Other designations
- CGCG 049-082, 2MASX J15161917+0709442

PGC 54493 is a barred spiral galaxy located about 490 million light-years away in the constellation Serpens. It is part of a galaxy group called Abell 2052. It has an estimated diameter of 234,000 light-years.

== See also ==
- Messier 109, another galaxy with a similar appearance in the constellation Ursa Major
