= SN 1998aq =

Supernova in the constellation Ursa Major

- Event type: Supernova
- Type Ia
- Date: April 13, 1998
- Constellation: Ursa Major
- Right ascension: 11^{h} 56^{m} 25.87^{s}
- Declination: +55° 07′ 43.2″
- Distance: 70.38 ± 0.23 Mly (21.58 ± 0.07 Mpc)
- Redshift: 0.0004, 0.0003, 0.002
- Host: NGC 3982
- Colour (B-V): −0.18 (peak)
- Peak apparent magnitude: 12.36

SN 1998aq was a nearby supernova located in the intermediate spiral galaxy NGC 3982, offset 18″ west and 7″ of the galactic nucleus. It was discovered April 13, 1998 by amateur astronomer Mark Armstrong and was confirmed by fellow British amateur Ron Arbour; both members of the U.K. Supernova/Nova Patrol. The event was not visible on a prior check by Armstrong made April 7. It reached peak brightness on April 27, and 15 days later had declined by 1.14 magnitudes in the B (blue) band.

Spectrum of SN1998aq, a Type Ia supernova, one day after maximum light in the B band

Spectroscopic observations determined this was a Type Ia supernova event, and it became one of the best-studied supernova of its type, at least in the visual band. An absorption feature of singly-ionized carbon was (probably) detected nine days before maximum, an indication of unburned ash left over from the original carbon-oxygen core of the progenitor white dwarf. Brightness calibration using Cepheid variables in NGC 3982 gives a peak absolute magnitude estimate of at least −19.47±0.15 (assuming no extinction in the host galaxy).
