= NGC 4026 =

Galaxy in the constellation Ursa Major

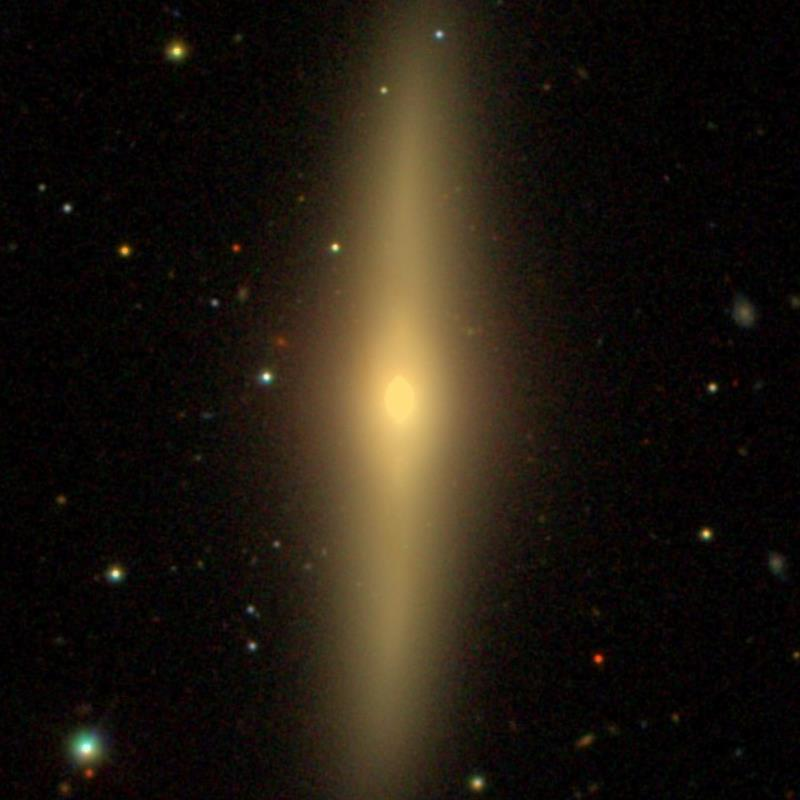
- NGC 4026 by SDSS

Observation data (J2000 epoch)
- Constellation: Ursa Major
- Right ascension: 11^{h} 59^{m} 25.2^{s}
- Declination: +50° 57′ 42″
- Redshift: 985±5 km/s
- Distance: 52 ± 14 Mly (15.9 ± 4.3 Mpc)
- Apparent magnitude (V): 10.7

Characteristics
- Type: S0
- Apparent size (V): 5.2′ × 1.3′

Other designations
- NGC 4026, UGC 6985, MCG +09-20-052, PGC 37760

NGC 4026 is an edge-on lenticular galaxy in the constellation Ursa Major. It is located at a distance of circa 50 million light years from Earth, which, given its apparent dimensions, means that NGC 4026 is about 80,000 light years across. It was discovered by William Herschel on April 12, 1789.

The galaxy hosts a supermassive black hole with estimated mass 10^{8.33±0.109} (166-275 million) M_{☉}.

== Nearby galaxies ==
NGC 4026 belongs to M109 Group, the largest subgroup of galaxies with the Ursa Major Cluster. In the vicinity of NGC 4026 lie some low surface brightness spiral galaxies, UGC 6917 (42 arcminutes from NGC 4026), UGC 6922 (26 arcminutes from NGC 4026) and UGC 6956 (10 arcminutes from NGC 4026).

NGC 4026 appears disturbed in HI imaging, with a filament extending southward. The mass of HI in NGC 4026 is below 0.71 × 10^{8} M⊙. The total HI mass in NGC 4026, UGC 6956 and the HI filament is estimated to be 7.94 × 10^{8} M⊙. This phenomenon has been studied and evidence implies the presence of tidal forces and tidal interactions between the galaxies.
