= NGC 4100 =

Galaxy in the constellation Ursa Major

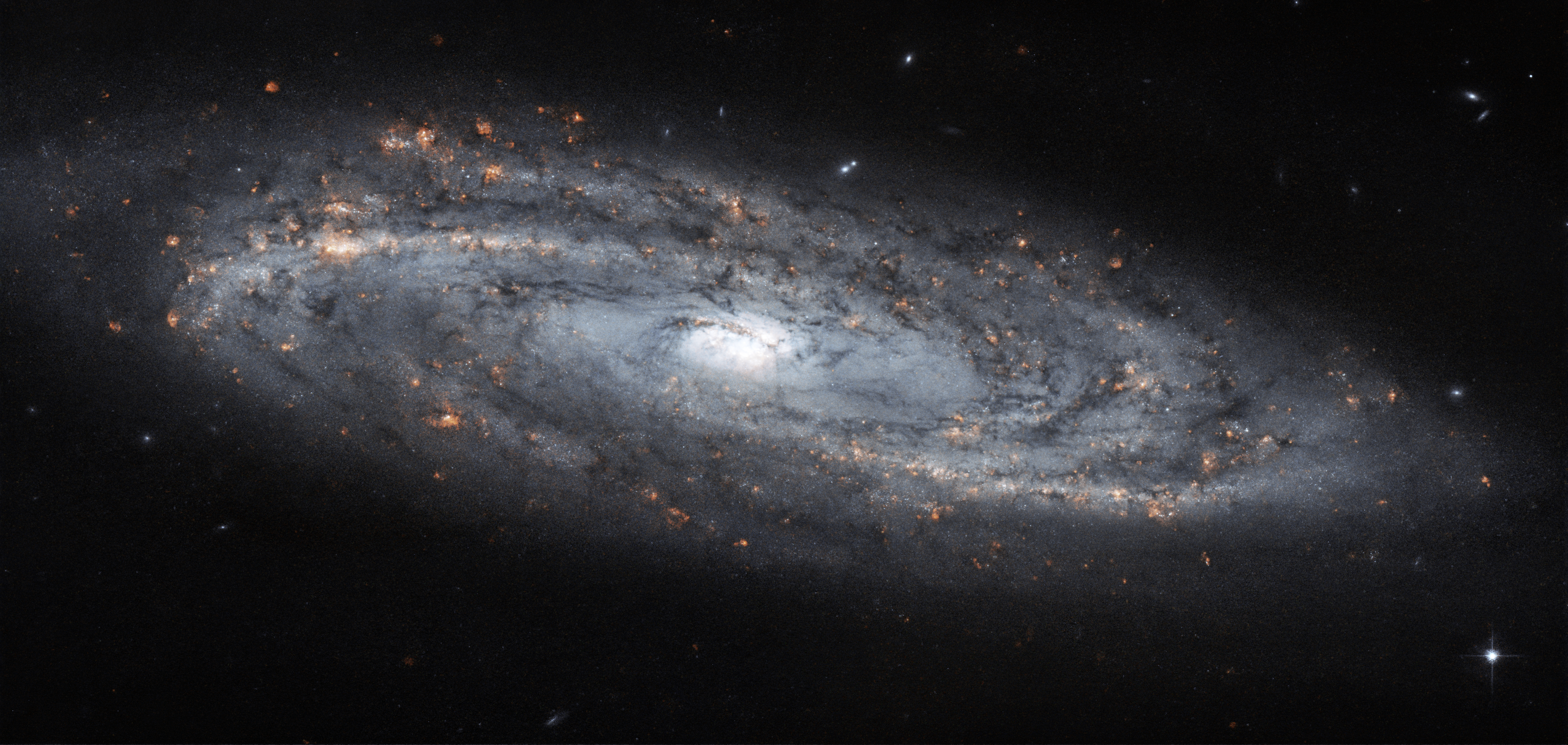
- Hubble Space Telescope image of NGC 4100

Observation data (J2000 epoch)
- Constellation: Ursa Major
- Right ascension: 12^{h} 06^{m} 08.602^{s}
- Declination: +49° 34′ 56.32″
- Redshift: 0.003582
- Heliocentric radial velocity: 1,072 ± 6 km/s
- Distance: 65.1 Mly (20.0 Mpc)
- Group or cluster: NGC 3992 group
- Apparent magnitude (B): 11.7

Characteristics
- Type: SAbc
- Mass: 33.3+10.7 −12.7×10^{9} M_{☉}

Other designations
- NGC 4100, UGC 7095, MCG +08-22-068, PGC 38370

NGC 4100 is a spiral galaxy in the northern constellation of Ursa Major. It was discovered by William Herschel on Mar 9, 1788. This galaxy is a member of the NGC 3992 group in the Ursa Major Cluster.

== Gallery ==
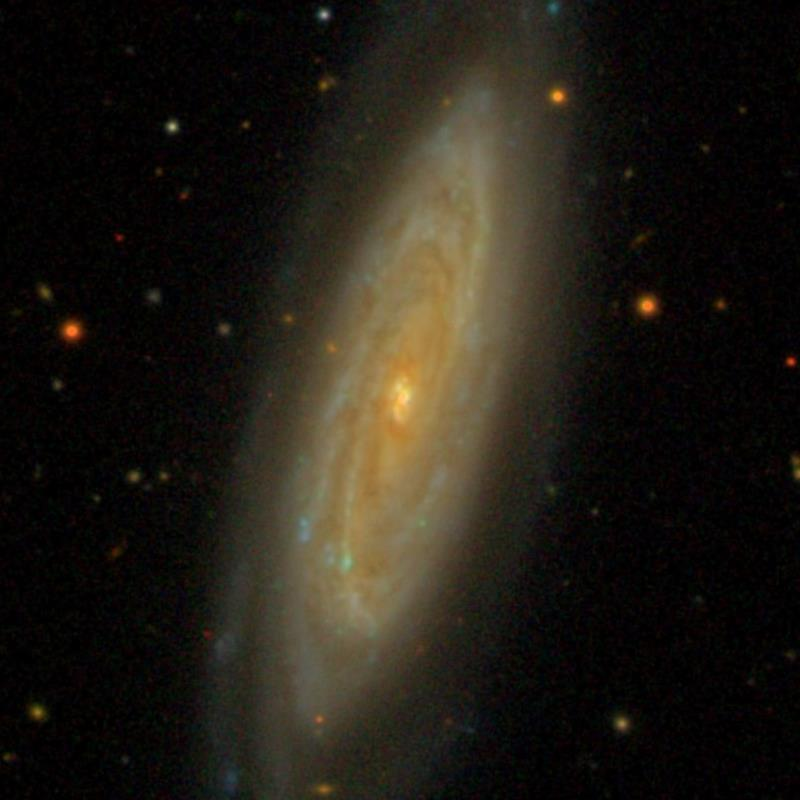
NGC 4100 (SDSS DR14)

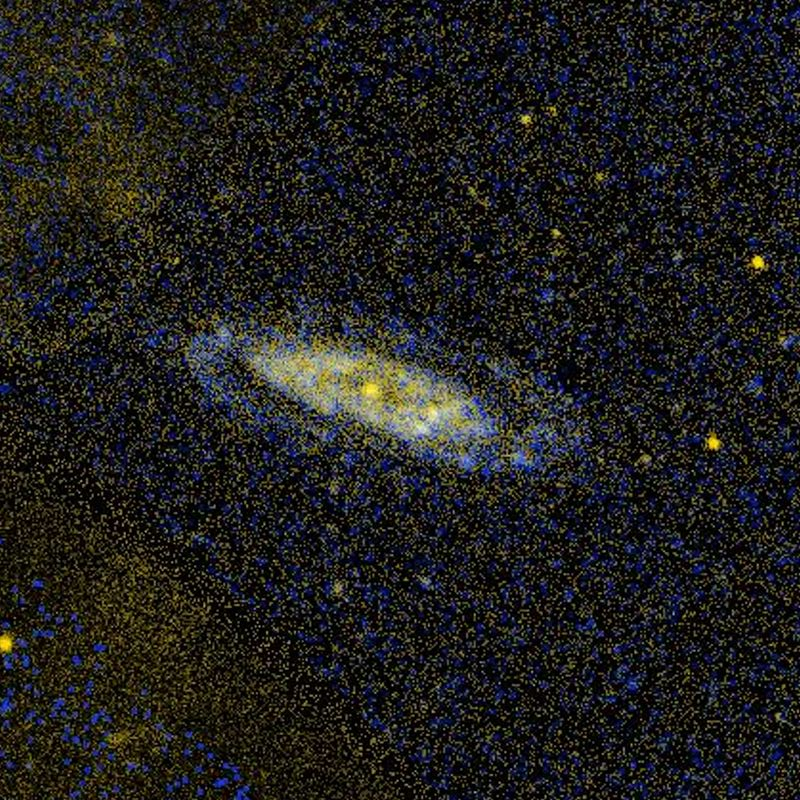
NGC 4100 by GALEX

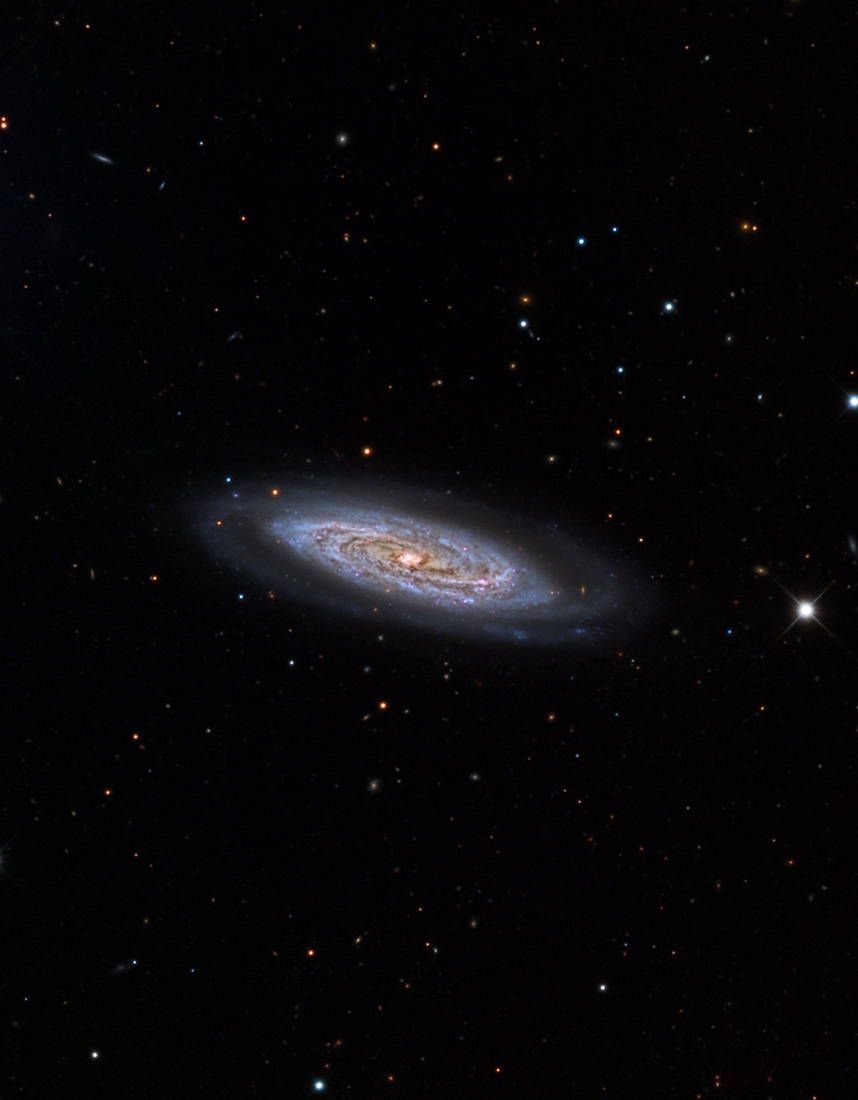
NGC 4100 by a 32-inch Schulman Telescope at the Mount Lemmon SkyCenter
