= Merak (star) =

Star in the constellation Ursa Major

- Location of Merak (circled)

Observation data Epoch J2000.0 Equinox ICRS
- Constellation: Ursa Major
- Right ascension: 11^{h} 01^{m} 50.47654^{s}
- Declination: +56° 22′ 56.7339″
- Apparent magnitude (V): +2.37

Characteristics
- Evolutionary stage: Main sequence
- Spectral type: A1IVps
- U−B color index: +0.00
- B−V color index: -0.02
- Variable type: Suspected

Astrometry
| Radial velocity (R_{v}) | −12.0 km/s |
| Proper motion (μ) | RA: +81.43 mas/yr Dec.: +33.49 mas/yr |
| Parallax (π) | 40.90±0.16 mas |
| Distance | 79.7 ± 0.3 ly (24.45 ± 0.10 pc) |
| Absolute magnitude (M_{V}) | +0.61 |

Details
| Mass | 2.56±0.04 M_{☉} |
| Radius | 2.81±0.17 R_{☉} |
| Luminosity | 63.5 L_{☉} |
| Surface gravity (log g) | 3.93±0.06 cgs |
| Temperature | 9,700±300 K |
| Rotational velocity (v sin i) | 47±3 km/s |
| Age | 390±43 Myr |

Other designations
- Merak, Mirak, β Ursae Majoris, β UMa, Beta UMa, 48 Ursae Majoris, BD+57°1302, FK5 416, GC 15145, HD 95418, HIP 53910, HR 4295, PPM 32912, SAO 27876

Database references
| SIMBAD | data |

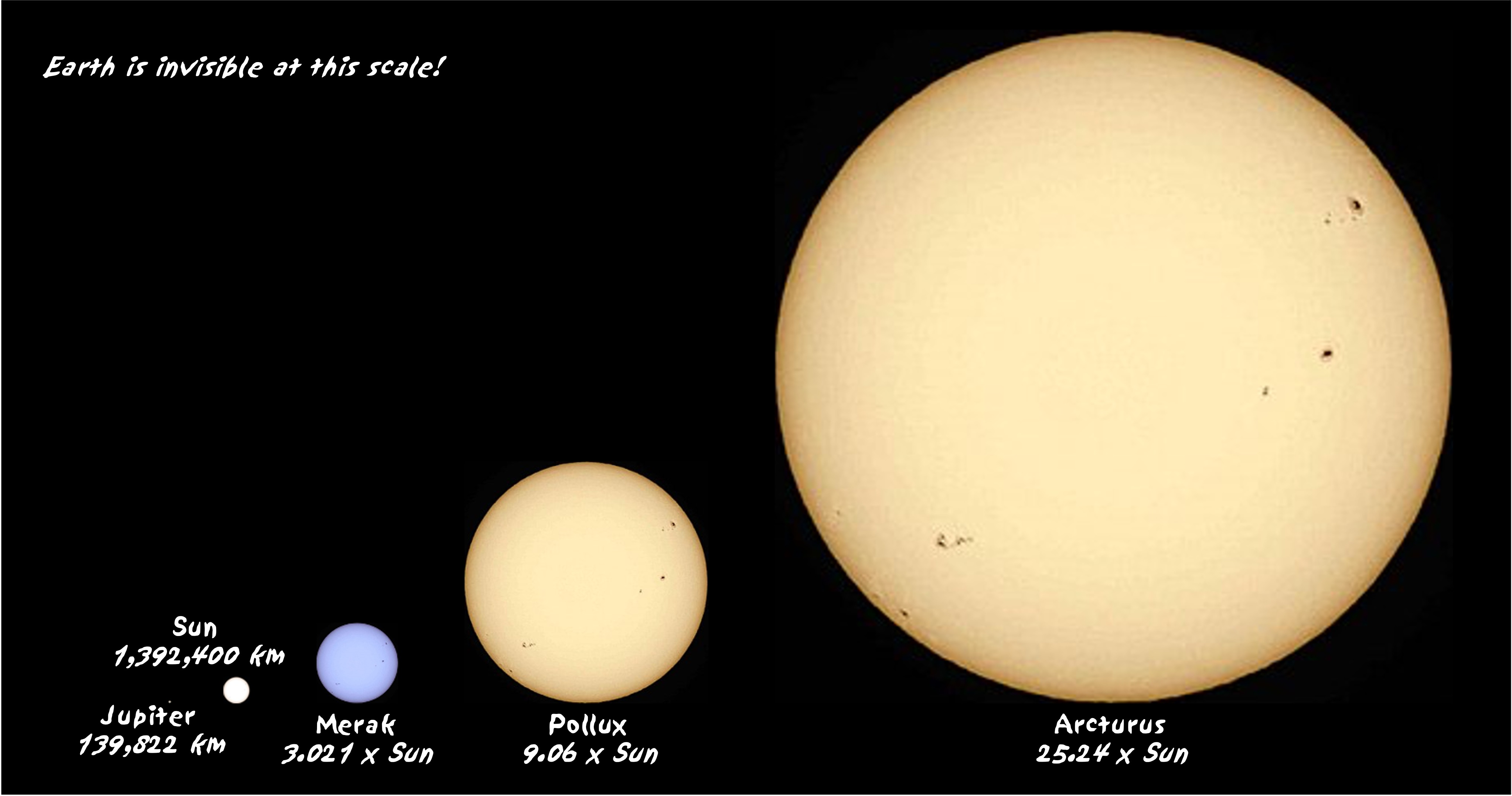
Size comparison between the Sun, Beta Ursae Majoris, Pollux, and Arcturus.

Merak /ˈmɪəræk/, also called Beta Ursae Majoris (β Ursae Majoris, abbreviated Beta UMa, β UMa), is a star in the northern constellation of Ursa Major.

The apparent visual magnitude of this star is +2.37, which means it is readily visible to the naked eye. It is more familiar to Northern Hemisphere observers as one of the "pointer stars" in the Big Dipper, or the Plough (UK), which is a prominent asterism of seven stars that forms part of the larger constellation. Extending an imaginary straight line from this star through the nearby Alpha Ursae Majoris (Dubhe) extends to Polaris, the north star.

== Spectral classification ==
In 1943, β Ursae Majoris was listed as a spectral standard for the class of A1 V. When improved instruments made it possible to identify subgiant luminosity classes for early A-class stars, β Ursae Majoris was assigned that class A0 IV. This was later revised to A1 IV. It is considered to be a mild Am star, a type of chemically peculiar star with unusually strong lines of certain metallic elements.

== Properties ==
Based upon parallax measurements, β Ursae Majoris is located at a distance of 79.7 light-years (24.4 parsecs) from the Sun. Although the spectrum has a luminosity class of a subgiant, stellar evolution models indicate that it is still on the main sequence, having gone through three-quarters of its main sequence lifetime. The effective temperature of the outer envelope is about 9,225 K, giving it a white-hued glow that is typical for A-type stars. It is larger than the Sun, with about 2.7 times the mass and 2.84 times the solar radius. If they were viewed from the same distance, Beta Ursae Majoris would appear much brighter than the Sun, as it is radiating 68 times the Sun's luminosity.

Observation of the star in the infrared reveal an excess emission that suggests the presence of a circumstellar debris disk of orbiting dust, much like those discovered around Fomalhaut and Vega. The mean temperature of this disk is 120 K, indicating that it is centered at a radius of 47 AU from the host star. The dust has an estimated mass of about 0.27% the mass of the Earth.

Beta Ursae Majoris is one of five stars in the Big Dipper that form a part of a loose open cluster called the Ursa Major moving group, sharing the same region of space and not just the same patch of sky from Earth's perspective. This group has an estimated age of about 500 (± 100) million years. As the members of this group share a common origin and motion through space, this yields an estimate for the age of Beta Ursae Majoris. Two stars are known to be located in relatively close proximity: 37 Ursae Majoris at 5.2 light-years (1.6 pc) and Gamma Ursae Majoris at 11 light-years (3.4 pc); much closer to each other than these stars are to the Earth.

== Nomenclature ==
β Ursae Majoris (Latinised to Beta Ursae Majoris) is the star's Bayer designation.

It bore the traditional name Merak derived from the Arabic المراق al-marāqq 'the loins' (of the bear). In 2016, the International Astronomical Union organized a Working Group on Star Names (WGSN) to catalog and standardize proper names for stars. The WGSN's first bulletin of July 2016 included a table of the first two batches of names approved by the WGSN; which included Merak for this star.

The Hindus called the star Pulaha, one of the Seven Rishis.

In Chinese, 北斗 (Běi Dǒu), meaning Northern Dipper, refers to an asterism equivalent to the Big Dipper. Consequently, the Chinese name for Beta Ursae Majoris itself is 北斗二 (Běi Dǒu èr, English: the Second Star of Northern Dipper) and 天璇 (Tiān Xuán, English: Star of Celestial Rotating Jade).

== In culture ==
USS Merak (1918) and USS Merak (AF-21) are both United States navy ships.

== See also ==
- Lists of stars
- List of brightest stars
- List of nearest bright stars
- Historical brightest stars
