= NGC 4088 =

Galaxy in the constellation of Ursa Major

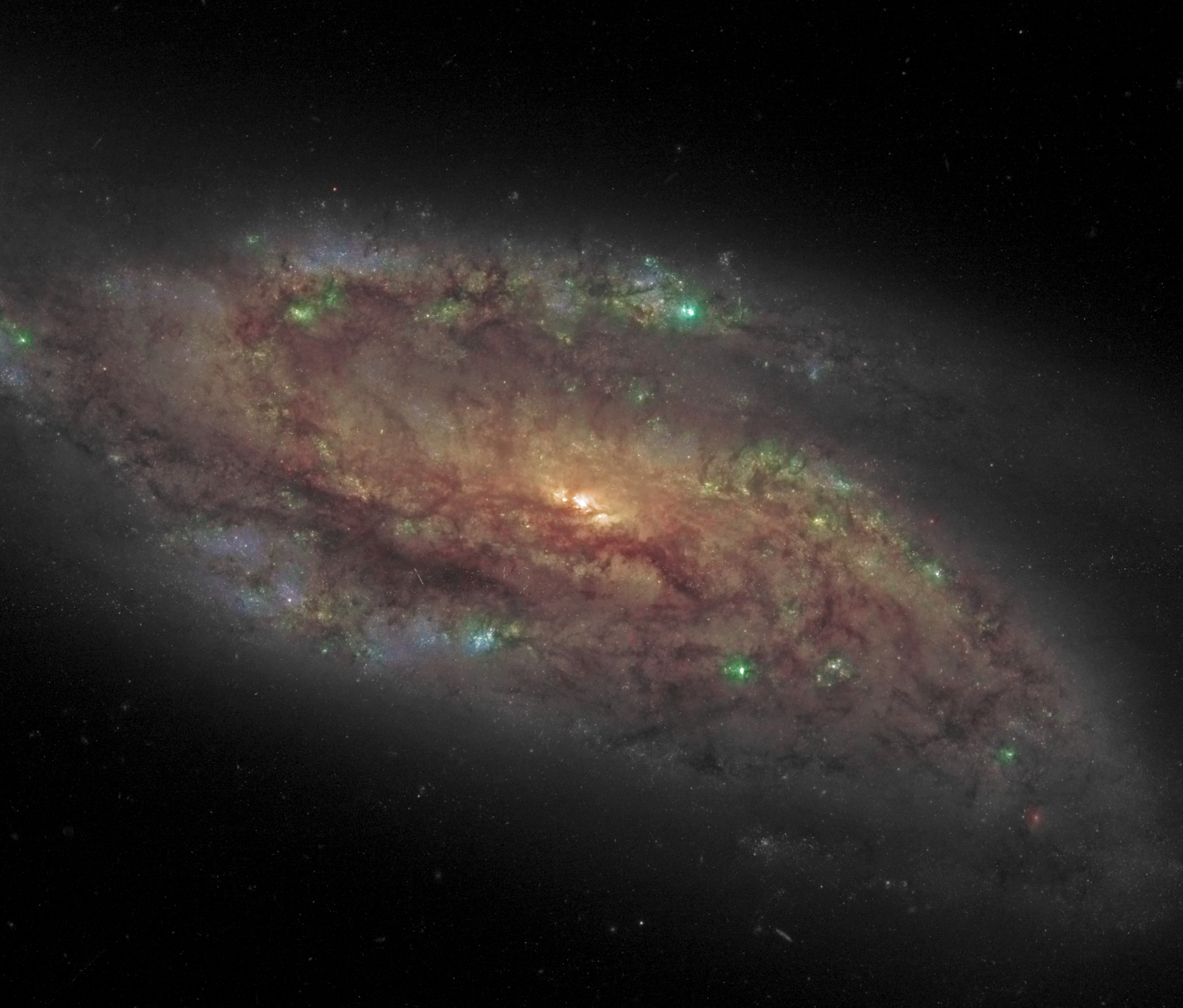
- Composite image of NGC 4088

Observation data (J2000 epoch)
- Constellation: Ursa Major
- Right ascension: 12^{h} 05^{m} 34.2^{s}
- Declination: +50° 32′ 21″
- Redshift: 0.002524
- Heliocentric radial velocity: 757 ± 1 km/s (470.4 ± 0.6 mi/s)
- Distance: 51.5 ± 4.5 Mly (15,800 ± 1,400 kpc)
- Apparent magnitude (V): 11.2

Characteristics
- Type: SAB(rs)bc
- Apparent size (V): 5.8′ × 2.2′

Other designations
- UGC 7081, PGC 38302, Arp 18, VV 357

NGC 4088 is a barred spiral galaxy in the constellation Ursa Major. The galaxy forms a physical pair with NGC 4085, which is located 11′ away.

== General information ==
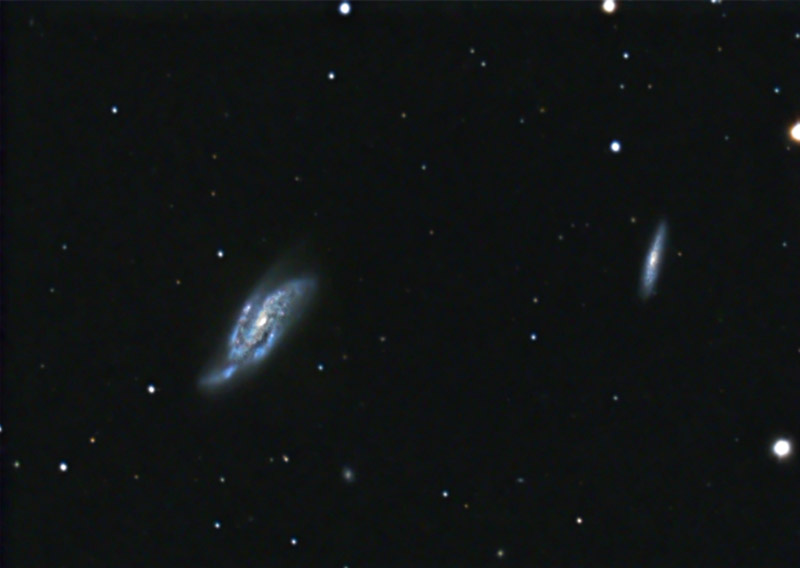
Amateur image of NGC 4088, left, and companion NGC 4085, right.

NGC 4088 is a grand design spiral galaxy. This means that the spiral arms in the galaxy's disk are sharply defined. In visible light, one of the spiral arms appears to have a disconnected segment. Halton Arp included this galaxy in the Atlas of Peculiar Galaxies as one of several examples where this phenomenon occurs.

NGC 4088 and NGC 4085 are members of the M109 Group, a group of galaxies located in the constellation Ursa Major. This large group contains between 41 and 58 galaxies, including the spiral galaxy M109.

== Supernovae ==
Three supernovae have been observed in NGC 4088:

- SN 1991G (Type II, mag. 17) was discovered by Jean Mueller on 10 February 1991.
- SN 2009dd (Type II, mag. 13.7) was discovered by Giancarlo Cortini on 13 April 13, 2009. At apparent magnitude 13.8, it became the third-brightest supernova of 2009.
- SN 2022jzc (Type II, mag. 17.8) was discovered by the Zwicky Transient Facility on 16 May 2022.
