= NGC 3953 =

Galaxy in the constellation Ursa Major

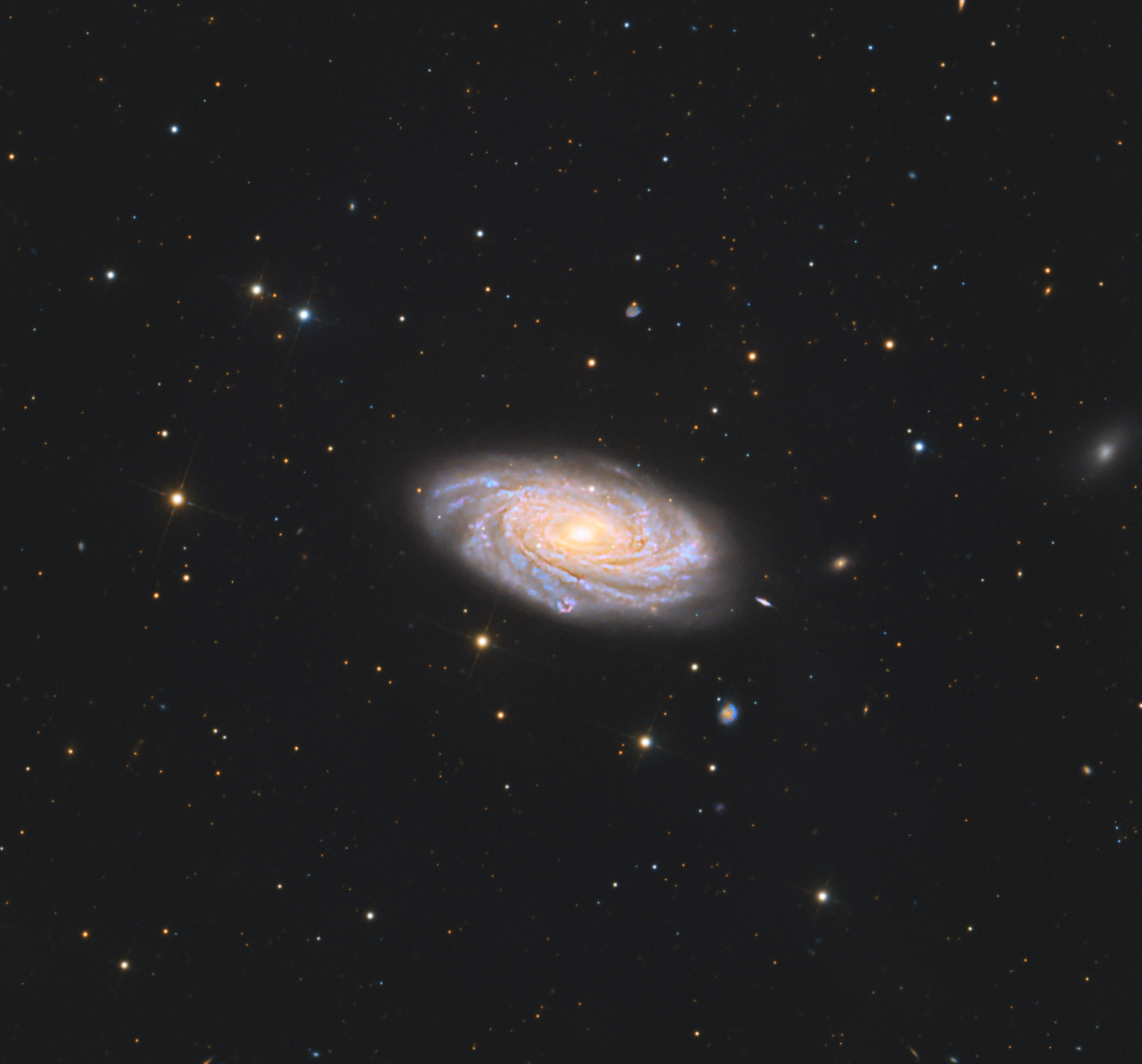
- NGC 3953 captured in 2026

Observation data (J2000 epoch)
- Constellation: Ursa Major
- Right ascension: 11^{h} 53^{m} 49.0283^{s}
- Declination: +52° 19′ 36.480″
- Redshift: 0.003502±0.000002
- Heliocentric radial velocity: 1,050±1 km/s
- Distance: 54.10 ± 1.93 Mly (16.588 ± 0.592 Mpc)
- Group or cluster: M109 Group
- Apparent magnitude (V): 9.8

Characteristics
- Type: SB(r)bc
- Size: 131,200 ly (40.2 kpc) (estimated)
- Apparent size (V): 6.9′ × 3.6′

Other designations
- IRAS 11511+5236, 2MASX J11534902+5219355, NGC 3953, UGC 6870, MCG +09-20-026, PGC 37306, CGCG 269-013

NGC 3953 is a barred spiral galaxy located in the northern constellation of Ursa Major. Its velocity with respect to the cosmic microwave background is 1,236±13 km/s, which corresponds to a Hubble distance of 59.4 ± 4.2 Mly (18.22 ± 1.29 Mpc). However, 33 non-redshift measurements give a closer mean distance of 54.10 ± 1.93 Mly (16.588 ± 0.592 Mpc). It was discovered by Pierre Méchain on 12 March 1781.

NGC 3953 is known to exhibit an inner ring structure that encircles the bar. NGC 3953 is a member of the M109 Group, a large group of galaxies located within the constellation Ursa Major that may contain over 50 galaxies.

== Supernovae ==
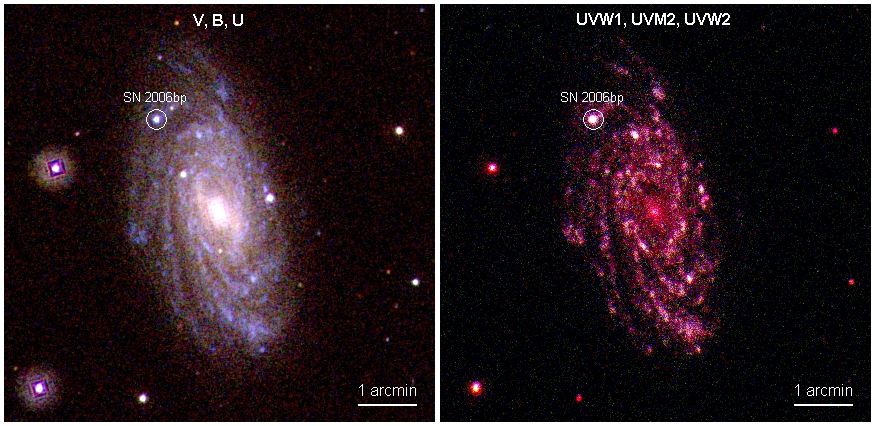
SN 2006bp

Two supernovae have been identified within NGC 3953:

- SN 2001dp (Type Ia, mag. 14.5) was discovered by Marco Migliardi and E. Dal Farra on 12 August 2001.
- SN 2006bp (Type II, mag. 16.7) was discovered by Kōichi Itagaki on 9 April 2006.
