= NGC 4102 =

Galaxy in the constellation Ursa Major

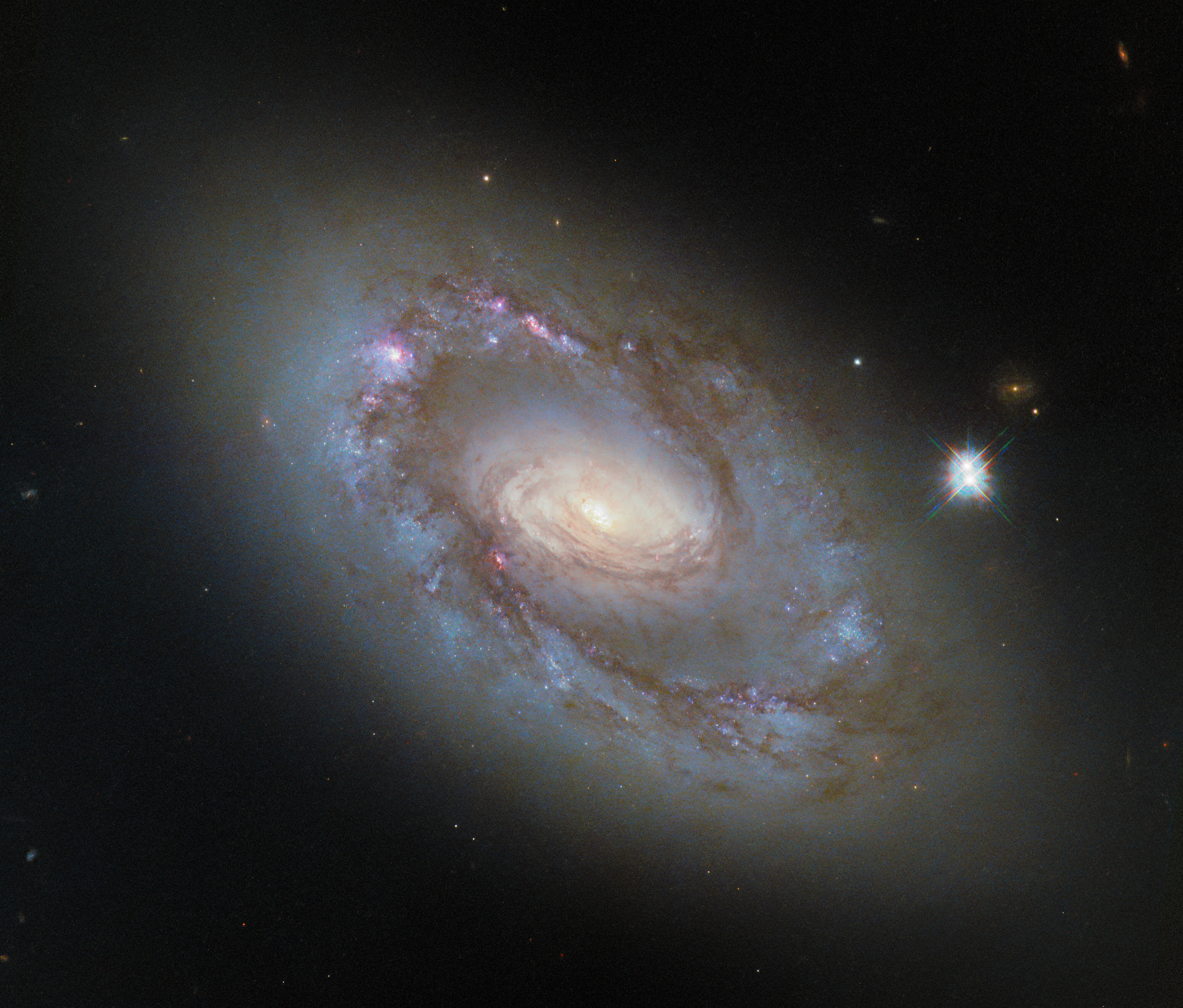
- NGC 4102 imaged by the Hubble Space Telescope

Observation data (J2000 epoch)
- Constellation: Ursa Major
- Right ascension: 12^{h} 06^{m} 23.115^{s}
- Declination: +52° 42′ 39.42″
- Redshift: 0.002792
- Heliocentric radial velocity: 837 km/s
- Distance: 59.6 Mly (18.3 Mpc)
- Group or cluster: Ursa Major group
- Apparent magnitude (V): 11.2
- Apparent magnitude (B): 11.8

Characteristics
- Type: SAB(s)b, SABab
- Apparent size (V): 2.9′ × 1.8′
- Notable features: LINER

Other designations
- IRAS 12038+5259, 2MASX J12062311+5242394, WISE J120623.07+524239.8, UGC 7096, LEDA 38392, MCG MCG+09-20-094, PGC 38392, SDSS J120623.00+524240.1

NGC 4102 is an intermediate barred spiral galaxy located in the northern constellation of Ursa Major. It is visible in a small telescope and has an apparent visual magnitude of 11.2. The galaxy was discovered April 12, 1789 by William Herschel. J. L. E. Dreyer described it as "bright, pretty small, round, brighter middle and bright nucleus". This galaxy is located at a distance of 60 million light years and is receding with a heliocentric radial velocity of 837 km/s. It is a member of the Ursa Major group of galaxies.

The morphological class of NGC 4102 is SABab or SAB(s)b?, which is a spiral galaxy with a bar-like feature around the core (SAB), no inner ring structure (s), and moderately tightly-wound spiral arms ('ab' or 'b'). However, the bar in this galaxy is considered particularly small for galaxies of this class. The galactic plane is inclined at an angle of 56°±2° to the line of sight from the Earth. NGC 4102 has a region of intense star formation in the nuclear region, known as a starburst region. This volume is 1,000 ly (310 pc) in diameter containing some 3 billion solar masses. An outflow of hydrogen has been detected, extending outward to the northwest as far as 6.3 kpc (21 kly) from the nucleus.

The core of NHC 4102 is almost certainly an active galactic nucleus (AGN), which indicates it has a supermassive black hole (SMBH) that is generating energy by accreting material. It is an X-ray source with a spectrum similar to a Seyfert 2 galaxy. This type of AGN is known as a Type-2 LINER, or low-ionization nuclear emission-line region. This is due to a core that is obscured by intervening dusty materials and/or the SMBH is accreting material in an inefficient manner. The bolometric luminosity of the active nucleus is ~7×10^{43} erg·s^{−1}.

== Supernova ==
One supernova has been observed in NGC 4102: SN 1975E (type unknown, mag. 16.7) was discovered by Yvonne Dunlap and Justus R. Dunlap on 7 May 1975.

== Image gallery ==
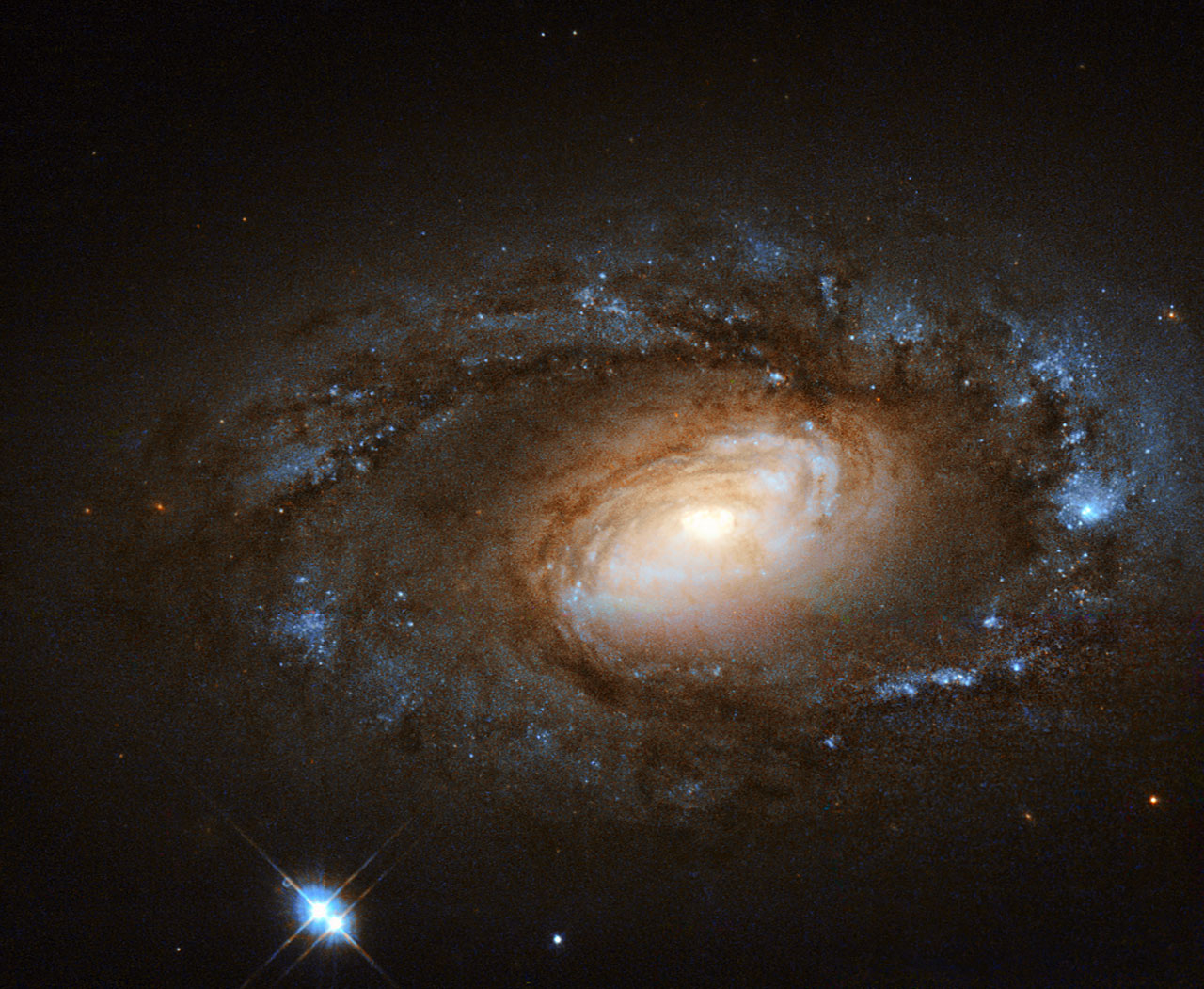
NGC 4102 imaged by the Hubble Space Telescope in 2014
