= NGC 3794 =

Galaxy in the constellation of Ursa Major

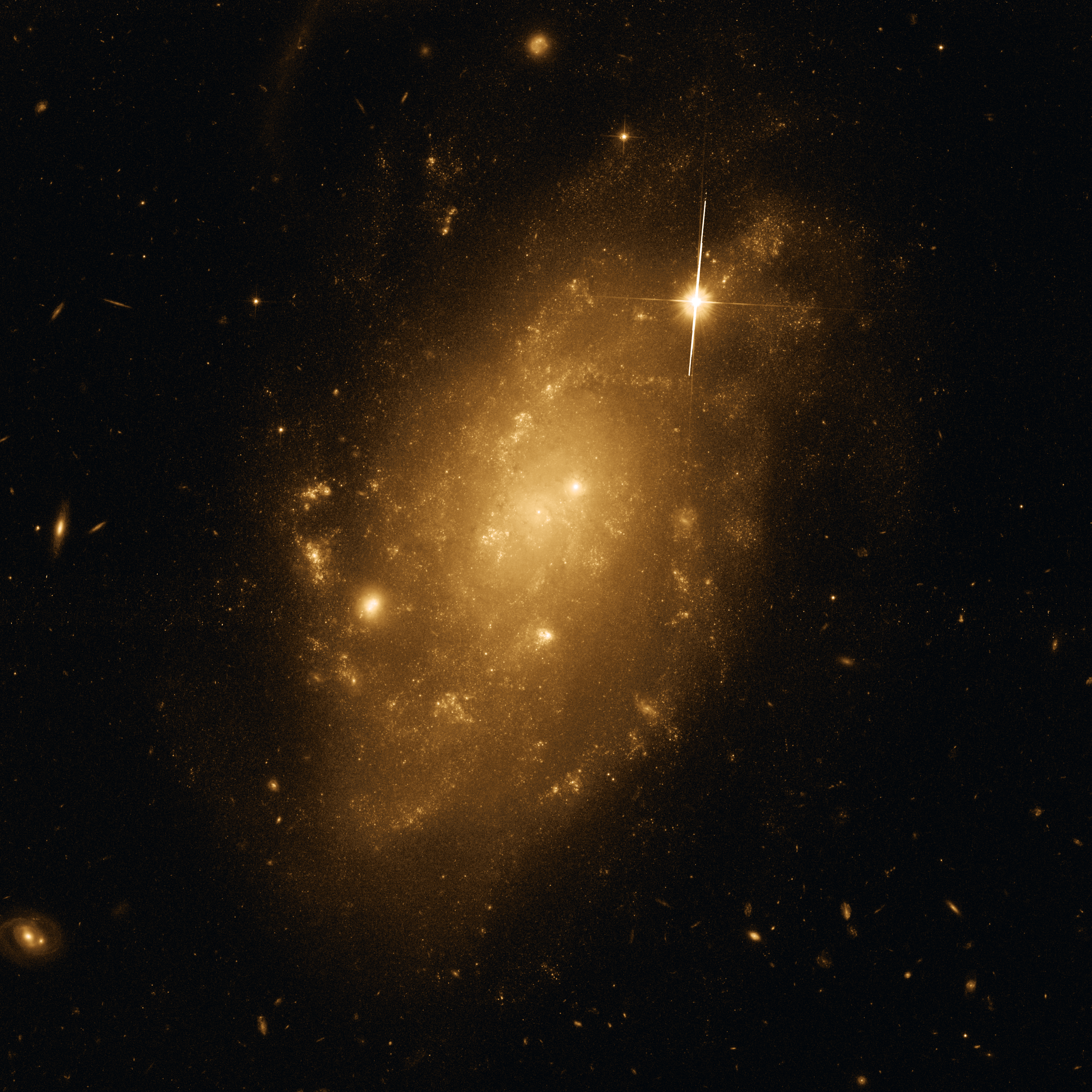
- An image of NGC 3794 taken with the Hubble Space Telescope.

Observation data (J2000 epoch)
- Constellation: Ursa Major
- Right ascension: 11^{h} 40^{m} 53.42^{s}
- Declination: +56° 12′ 07.3″
- Redshift: 0.00462
- Heliocentric radial velocity: 1385 km/s
- Distance: 68.5 Mly (20.99 Mpc)
- Apparent magnitude (V): 13.01
- Apparent magnitude (B): 13.89

Characteristics
- Type: SAB(s)d

Other designations
- NGC 3804, UGC 6640, MCG +09-19-153, PGC 36238

NGC 3794, also cataloged in the New General Catalogue as NGC 3804, is a low-surface-brightness galaxy in the constellation Ursa Major. It is very far from Earth, with a distance of about 68,470,000 light-years (20,990,000 pc). It was discovered on April 14, 1789, by the astronomer William Herschel.
