= NGC 3982 =

Galaxy in the constellation Ursa Major

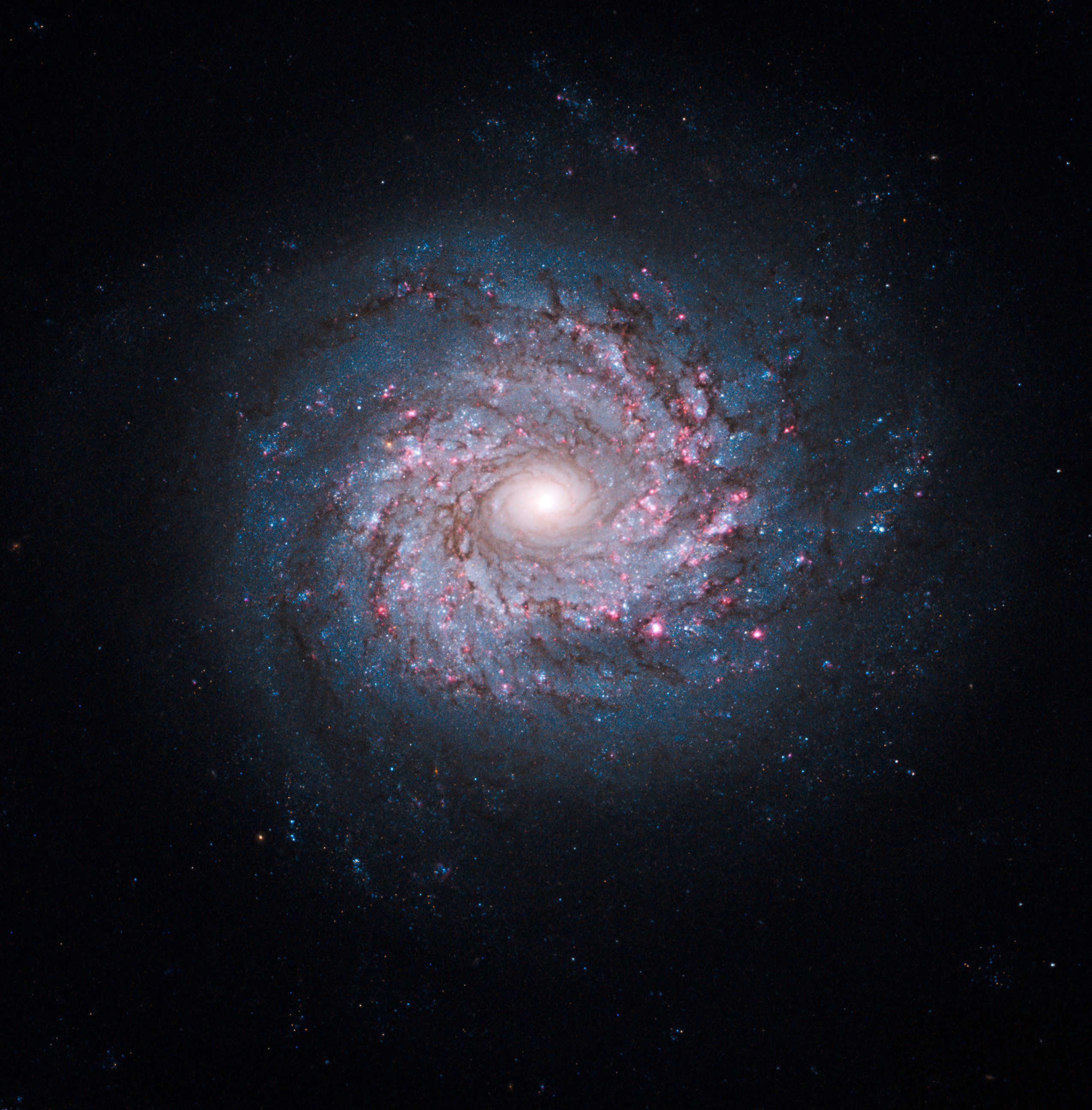
- NGC 3982 imaged by the Hubble Space Telescope

Observation data (J2000 epoch)
- Constellation: Ursa Major
- Right ascension: 11^{h} 56^{m} 28.1280^{s}
- Declination: +55° 07′ 30.766″
- Redshift: 0.003741±0.000000638
- Heliocentric radial velocity: 1,122±0 km/s
- Distance: 67.8 ± 2.5 Mly (20.80 ± 0.77 Mpc); 70.38 ± 0.23 Mly (21.58 ± 0.07 Mpc)
- Group or cluster: M109 Group
- Apparent magnitude (V): 11.1

Characteristics
- Type: SAB(r)b
- Size: ~50,400 ly (15.44 kpc) (estimated)
- Apparent size (V): 2.3′ × 2.0′

Other designations
- IRAS 11538+5524, UGC 6918, MCG +09-20-036, PGC 37520, CGCG 269-019

NGC 3982 is an intermediate spiral galaxy approximately 68 million light-years away in the constellation Ursa Major. It was discovered by German-British astronomer William Herschel on April 14, 1789, and misclassified as a planetary nebula. NGC 3982 is a part of the M109 Group of galaxies.

At an apparent magnitude of 12.0, NGC 3982 needs a telescope to be viewed. Using small telescopes, the galaxy appears as a very faint, diffuse patch of light, with its central region appearing as a slightly brighter diffuse ball.

== General ==
NGC 3982 is a Seyfert 2 galaxy that spans about 30,000 light-years, about one-third of the size of our Milky Way galaxy. The galaxy is receding from us at about 1,109 km/s. The galaxy is a typical spiral galaxy, similar to our Milky Way. It harbors a supermassive black hole at its core and has massive regions of star formation in the bright blue knots in the spiral arms. Supernovae are likely to be found within these regions.

NGC 3982 has a high rate of star birth within its arms, which are lined by pink star-forming regions of glowing hydrogen and newborn blue star clusters. Its bright nucleus is home to older populations of stars, which grow more densely packed toward the center. The galaxy also has active star formation in the circumnuclear region, estimated at 0.52 M_{☉}/year. The HST image of NGC 3982 shows a mini-spiral between the circumnuclear star-forming region and the galaxy's nucleus, which could be the channel through which gas is transported to the supermassive black hole from the star-forming region.

NGC 3982 is a member of the M109 Group, a group of galaxies located in the constellation Ursa Major that may contain over 50 galaxies. The group was named after the brightest galaxy in the group, the spiral galaxy M109.

Astronomers are interested in studying this galaxy as it can help in measuring extragalactic distances. It is helpful because it possesses two tools used to estimate astronomical distances: supernovae and Cepheid variable stars.

== Supernovae ==
Two supernovae have been observed in NGC 3982:

- SN 1998aq (Type Ia, mag. 14.9) was discovered by British amateur astronomer Mark Armstrong on April 13, 1998. It was discovered when it had an apparent magnitude of 14.9, and had grown considerably brighter by two days after its initial sighting, eventually reaching maximum magnitude of 12.0.
- SN 2025ajmz (Type IIn, mag. 20.5335) was discovered by the Zwicky Transient Facility on November 28, 2025. It was initially classified as Type IIn, but later analysis suggested that it instead might be a LBV-like eruption or a pre-supernova eruption.

== See also ==
- List of NGC objects (3001–4000)
