= NGC 4217 =

Spiral galaxy in constellation Canes Venatici

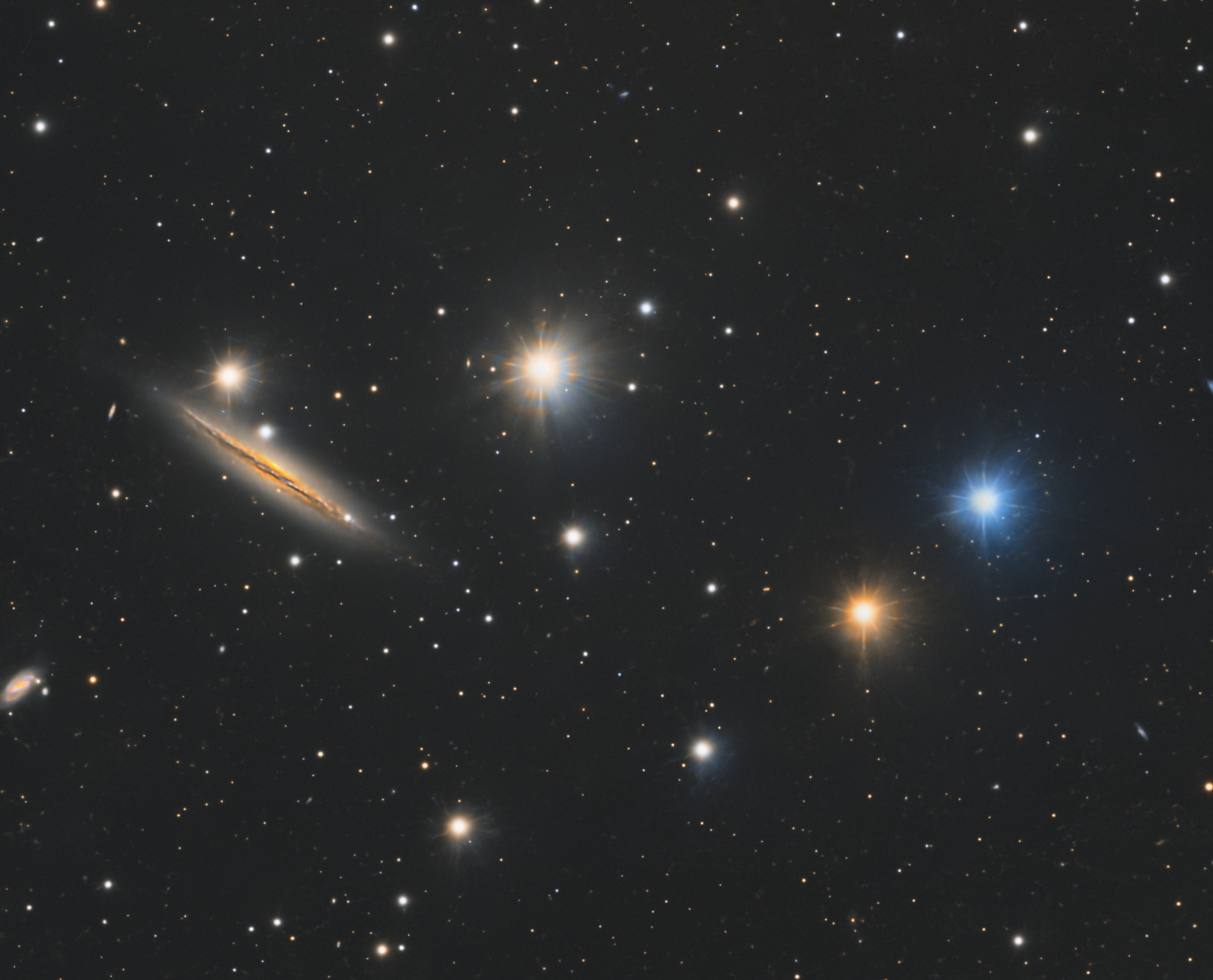
- NGC 4217 (left) with foreground stars in the Milky Way

Observation data (J2000 epoch)
- Constellation: Canes Venatici
- Right ascension: 12^{h} 15^{m} 50.900^{s}
- Declination: +47° 05′ 30.44″
- Redshift: 0.003419
- Heliocentric radial velocity: 1023 km/s
- Distance: 61.6 Mly (18.88 Mpc)
- Apparent magnitude (B): 12.4

Characteristics
- Type: Sb
- Apparent size (V): 5.012′ × 1.479′

Other designations
- UGC 7282, MCG +08-22-087, PGC 39241

NGC 4217 is an edge-on spiral galaxy which lies approximately 60 million light-years (18 million parsecs) away in the constellation of Canes Venatici. It was discovered by German-British astronomer William Herschel on 10 April 1788. It is a possible companion galaxy to Messier 106 (NGC 4258).

== Supernova ==
One supernova has been observed in NGC 4217:

- SN 2022myz (Type I, mag. 19.064) was discovered by the Zwicky Transient Facility on 19 June 2022.

== Gallery ==
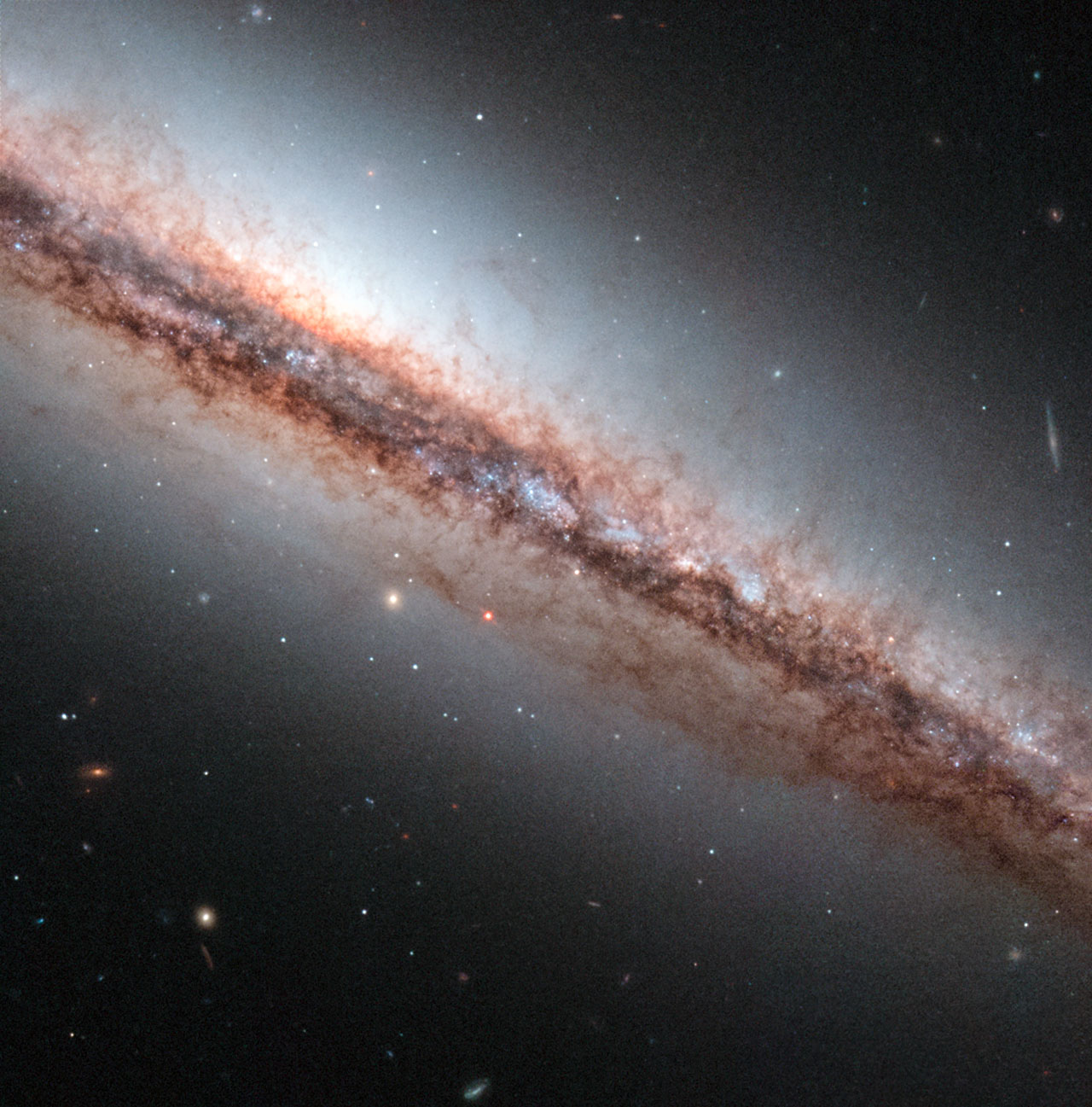
Dust filaments of NGC 4217.

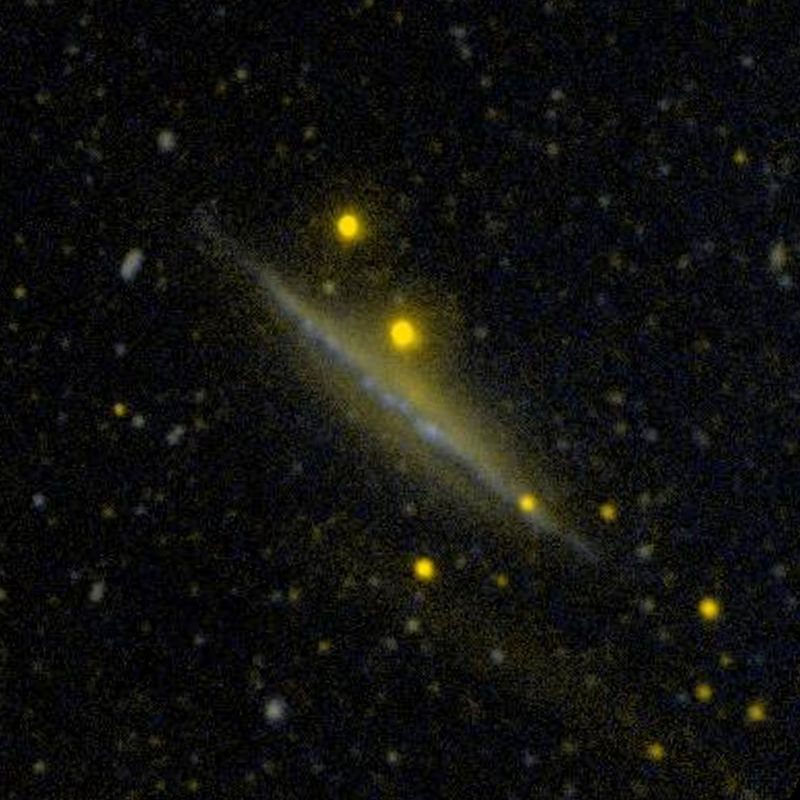
NGC 4217 by GALEX

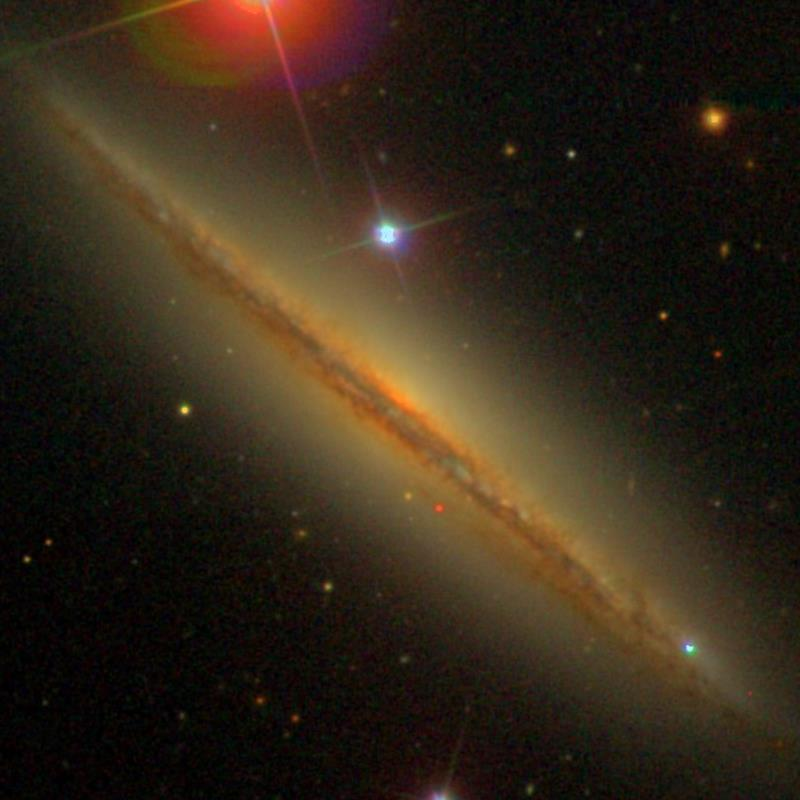
NGC 4217 (SDSS DR14)

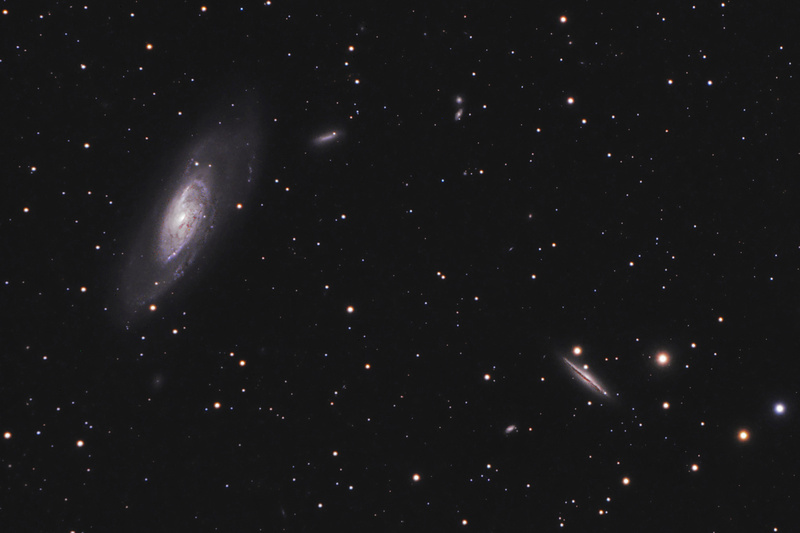
NGC 4217 (lower right) next to M106
