= NGC 3898 =

Galaxy in the constellation Ursa Major

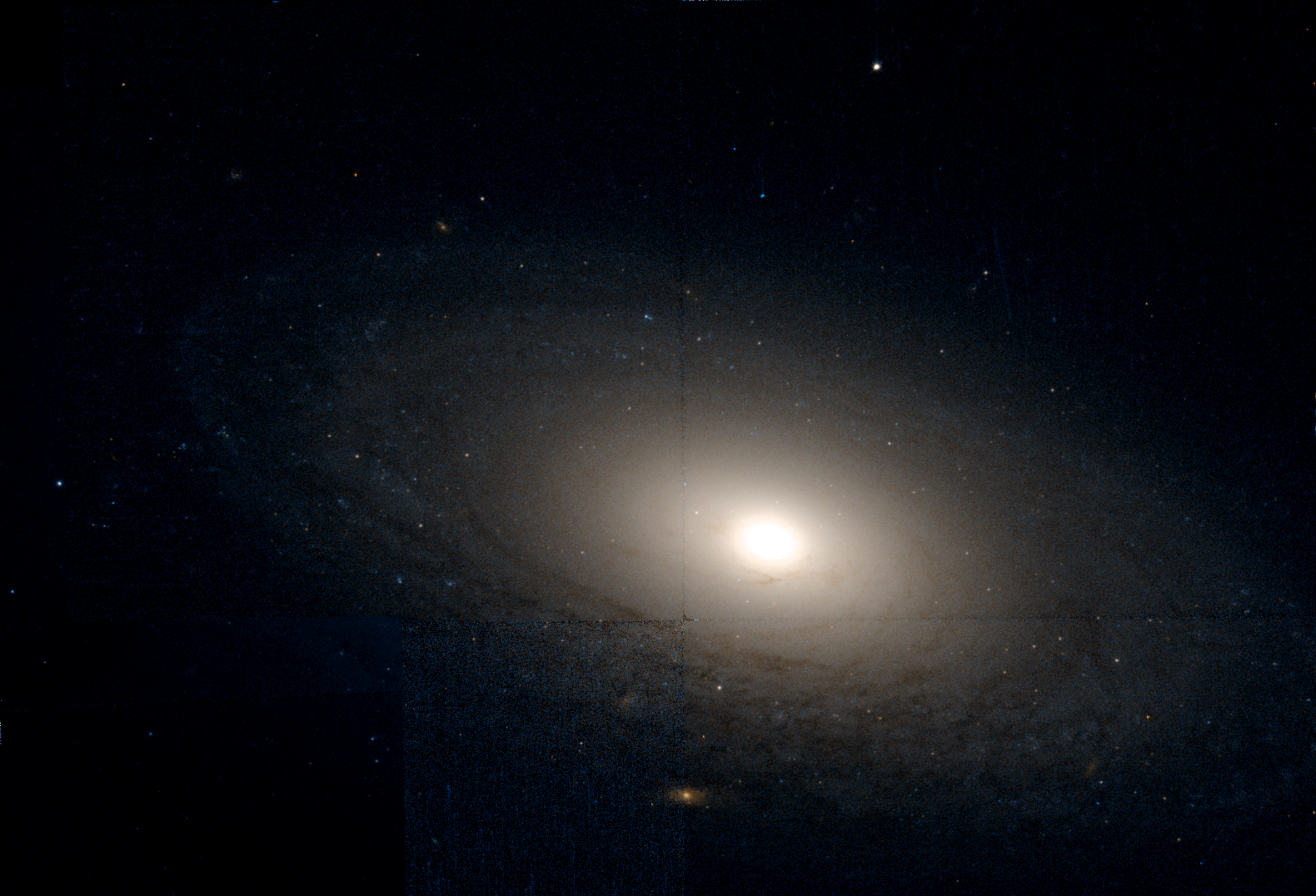
- Hubble Space Telescope image of NGC 3898

Observation data (J2000 epoch)
- Constellation: Ursa Major
- Right ascension: 11^{h} 49^{m} 15.370^{s}
- Declination: +56° 05′ 03.66″
- Redshift: 0.003894
- Heliocentric radial velocity: 1,142.7±13.9 km/s
- Distance: 72.0 ± 5.8 Mly (22.08 ± 1.79 Mpc)
- Apparent magnitude (V): 10.7
- Apparent magnitude (B): 11.02

Characteristics
- Type: SA(s)ab
- Apparent size (V): 3.3′ × 1.5′

Other designations
- IRAS 11465+5621, NGC 3898, UGC 6787, LEDA 36921, MCG +09-19-204

NGC 3898 is a spiral galaxy in the constellation Ursa Major that was discovered by William Herschel on April 14, 1789. It is positioned 1.5° northwest of NGC 3998 and is barely visible in a small telescope. The galaxy has an apparent visual magnitude of 10.7 and an angular size of 3.3′ × 1.5′. It is located at a distance of 72 ± 6 million light-years (22.08 ± 1.79 Mpc) from the Milky Way, and is receding with a heliocentric radial velocity of 1,142.7±13.9 km/s.

The morphological classification of NGC 3898 in the De Vaucouleurs system is SA(s)ab, which indicates this is a spiral galaxy with no central bar (SA) or inner ring system (s) and tightly wound spiral arms (ab). It is gas rich and serves as the prototype of an Sa galaxy with flocculent arms. The galactic plane is inclined at an angle of 68°±4° to the plane of the sky, with the major axis oriented along a position angle of 107°. The nucleus is intermediate between an H II region and a LINER.

There is a small, irregular galaxy, UGC 6816, located at an angular separation of 26′ from NGC 3898.

== Gallery ==
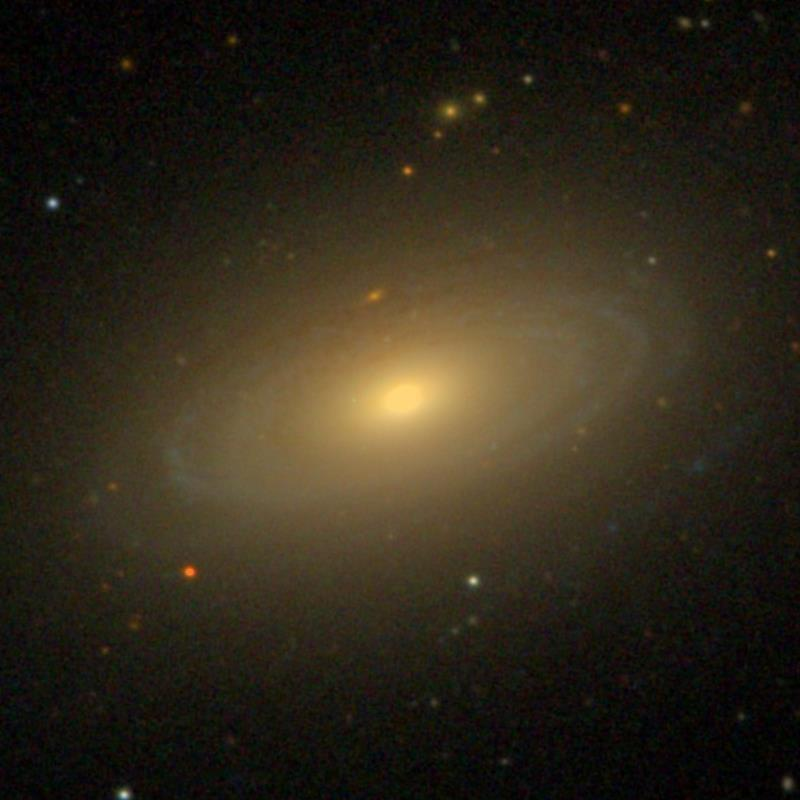
NGC 3898 (SDSS DR14)

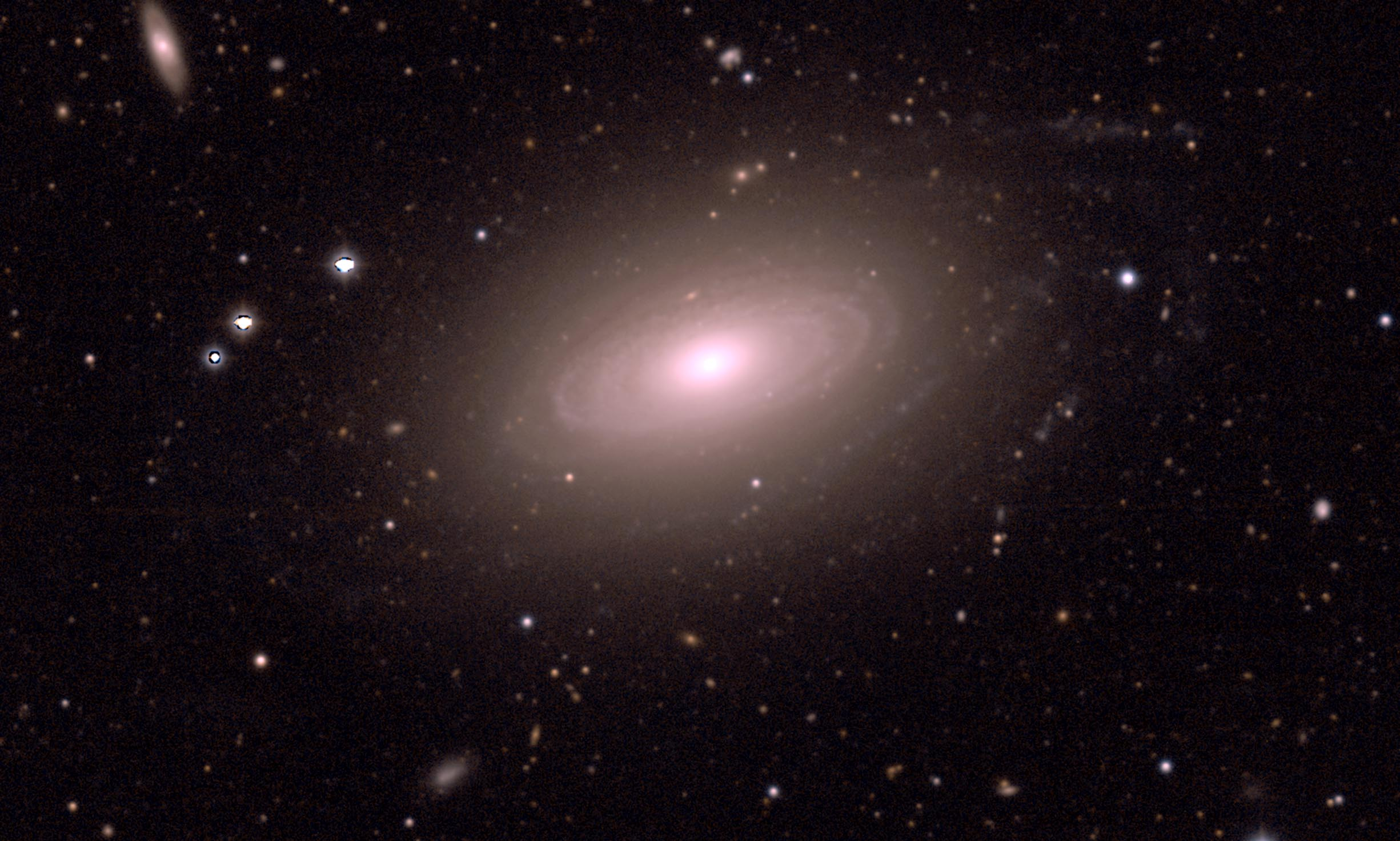
NGC 3898 with the legacy surveys
