= Messier 109 =

Galaxy in the constellation Ursa Major

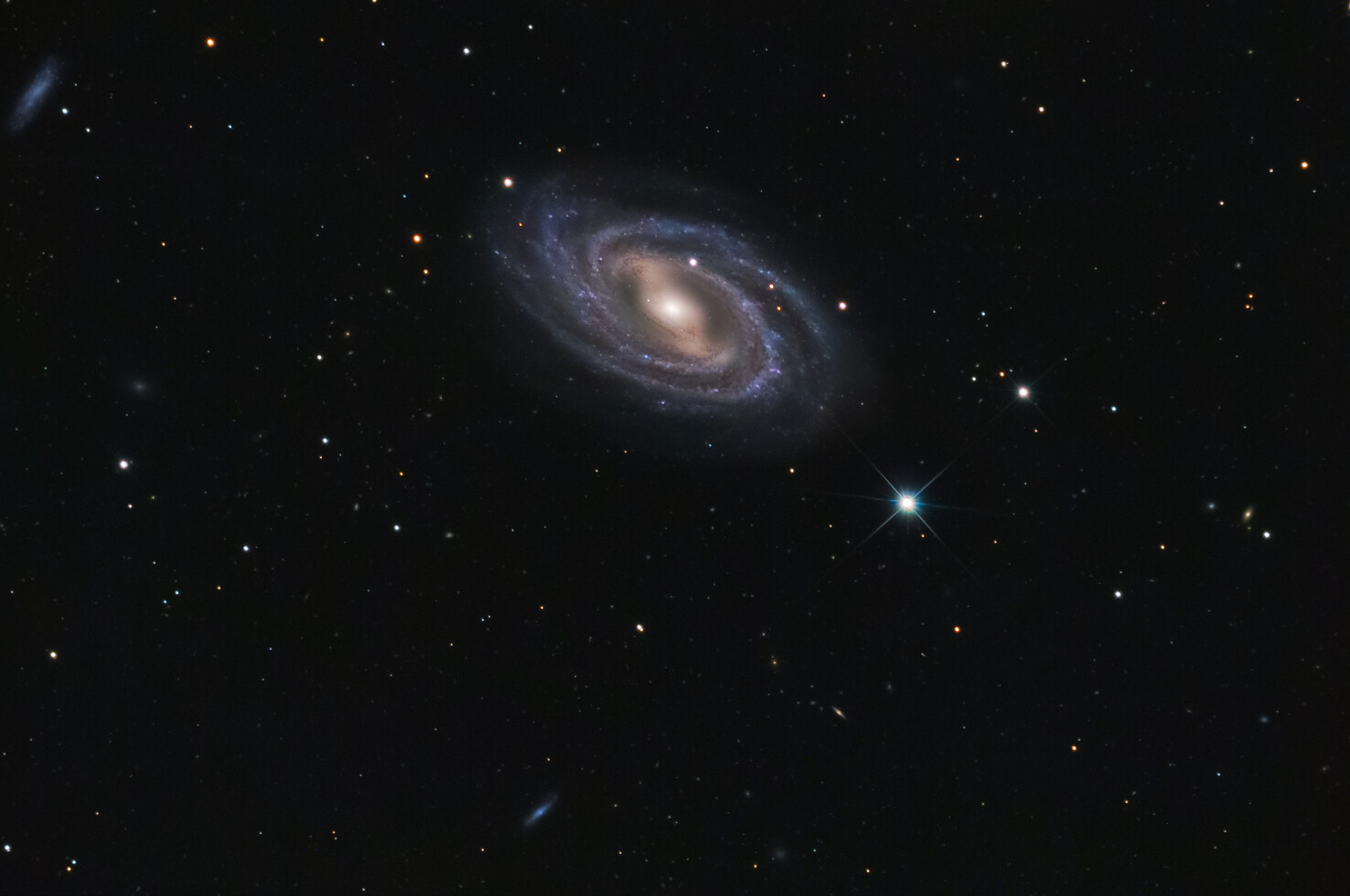
- Messier 109, as imaged during the Advanced Observing Program

Observation data (J2000 epoch)
- Constellation: Ursa Major
- Right ascension: 11^{h} 57^{m} 36.0^{s}
- Declination: +53° 22′ 28″
- Redshift: 0.003496±0.000004
- Heliocentric radial velocity: 1048±1 km/s
- Galactocentric velocity: 1121±3 km/s
- Distance: 67.2 ± 23.2 Mly (20.6 ± 7.1 Mpc)
- Apparent magnitude (V): 9.8

Characteristics
- Type: SB(rs)bc, LINER/HII
- Size: 176,170 ly (54.04 kpc) (estimated)
- Apparent size (V): 7.6 × 4.7 moa

Other designations
- IRAS 11549+5339, NGC 3992, UGC 6937, MCG +09-20-044, PGC 37617
- References: SIMBAD: Search M109

Messier 109 (also known as NGC 3992 or the Vacuum Cleaner Galaxy) is a barred spiral galaxy approximately 67.2 ± 23 million light-years away in the northern constellation Ursa Major. M109 can be seen south-east of the star Phecda (γ UMa, Gamma Ursa Majoris).

== History ==
Messier 109 was discovered by Pierre Méchain in 1781. Two years later Charles Messier catalogued the object, as an appended object to his publication.

Between the 1920s through the 1950s, it was considered that Messier objects over 103 were not official, but later the additions, further referred target objects from Méchain, became more widely accepted. David H. Levy mentions the modern 110 object catalog while Sir Patrick Moore places the limit at 104 objects but has M105 to 109 listed as addenda. By the late 1970s all 110 objects were in common use among astronomers and remain so to this day.

== General information ==
This galaxy is the most distant object in the Messier Catalog, followed by M91.

M109 has three satellite galaxies (UGC 6923, UGC 6940 and UGC 6969) and possibly more. Detailed hydrogen line observations have been obtained from M109 and its satellites. M109's H I (H one) distribution is regular with a low-level radial extension outside the stellar disc, while in the bar is a central H I hole in the gas distribution. Possibly the gas has been transported inwards by the bar, and because of the emptiness of the hole no large accretion events can have happened in the recent past.

M109 is the brightest galaxy in the M109 Group, a large group of galaxies in the constellation Ursa Major that may number over 50.

== Supernova ==
One supernova has been observed in M109: SN 1956A (Type Ia, mag. 12.3) was discovered by Howard S. Gates on 8 March 1956, using the 18-inch Schmidt telescope at the Palomar Observatory. It was located 67" east and 9" south of the center of the galaxy.

== Gallery ==
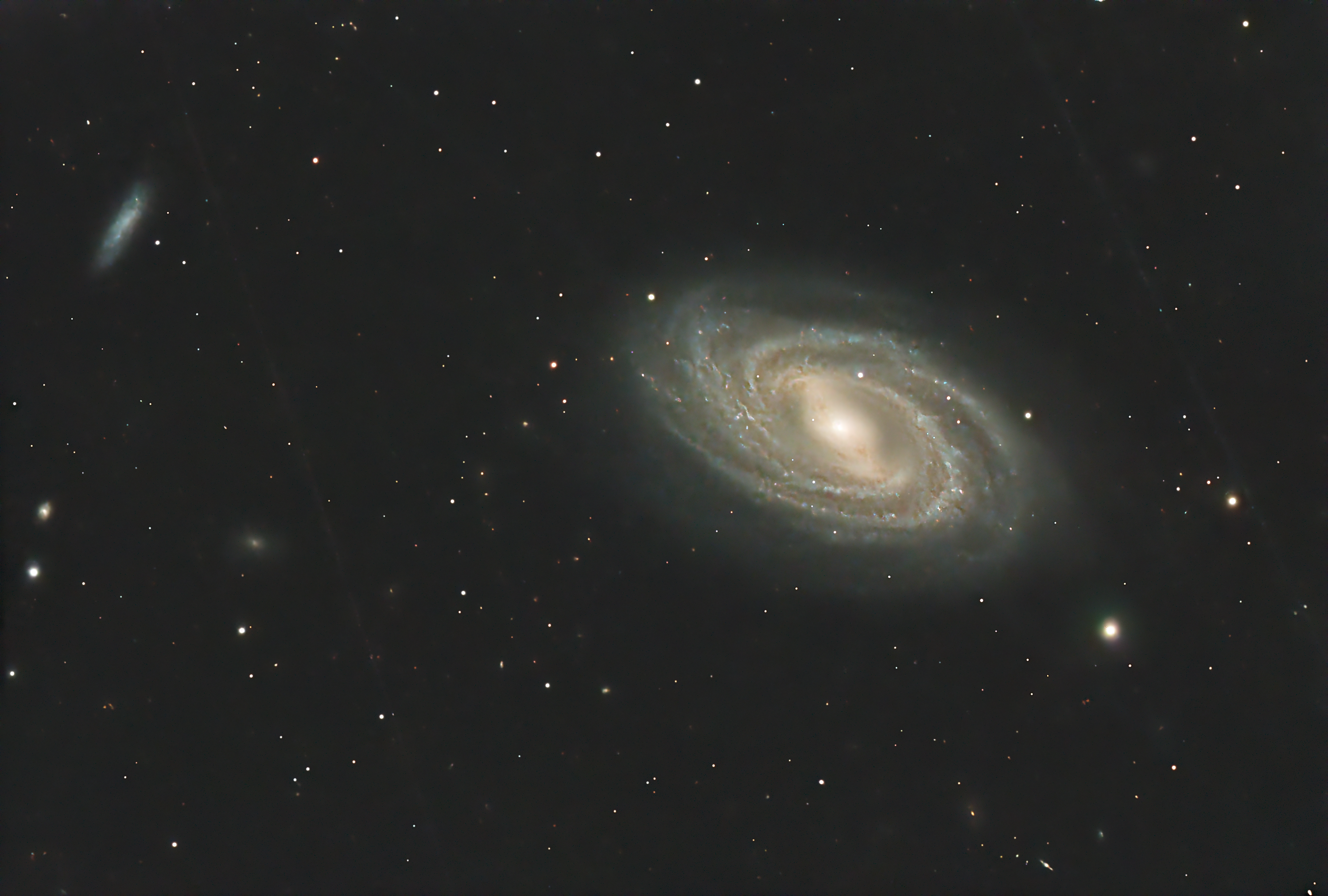
M109 NGC3992, J87 Observatory

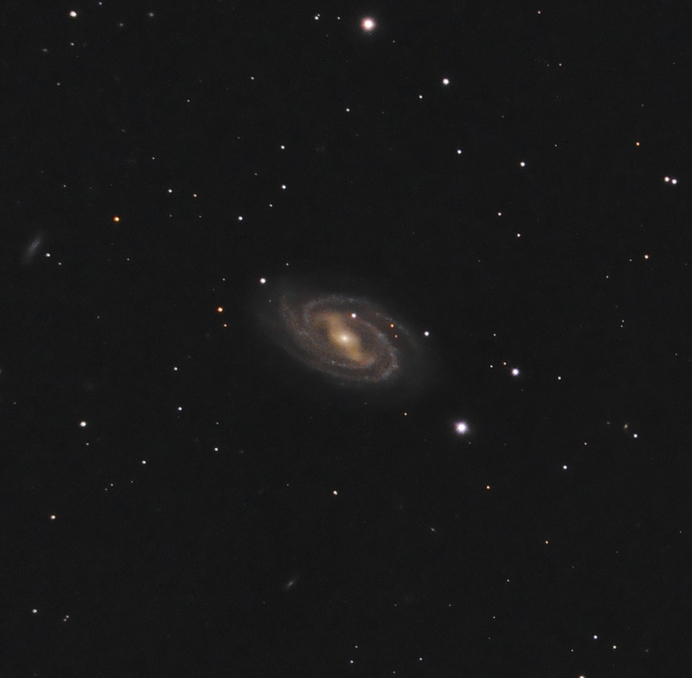
Amateur image of Messier 109

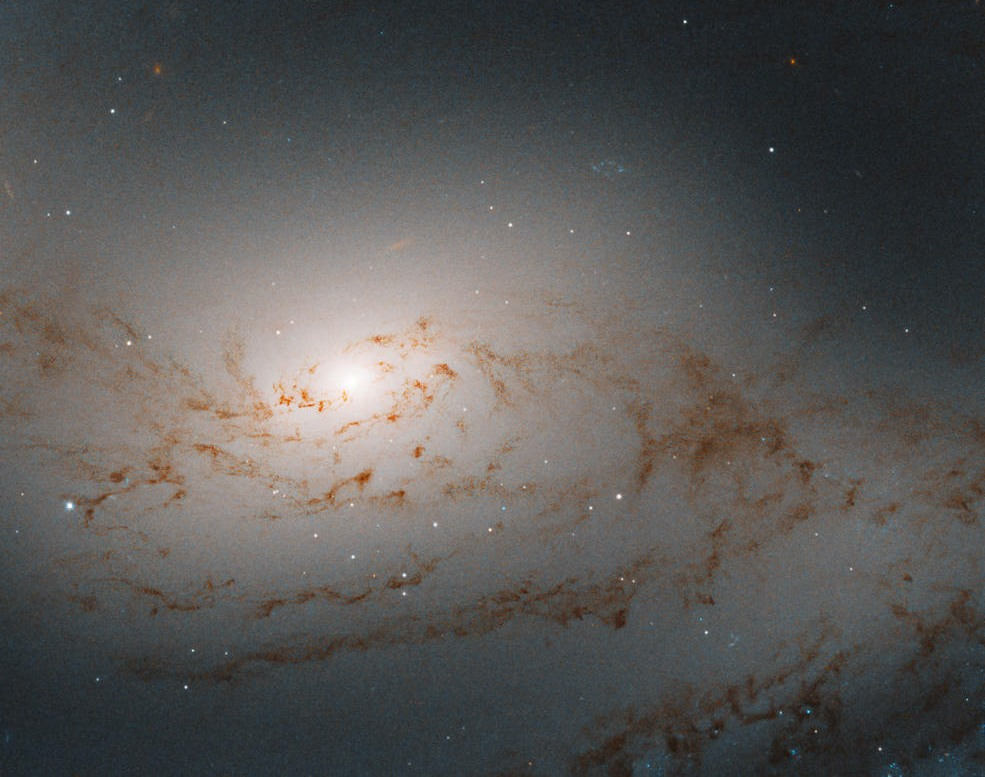
Core of galaxy M109, Hubble image captured by Wide Field Camera 3

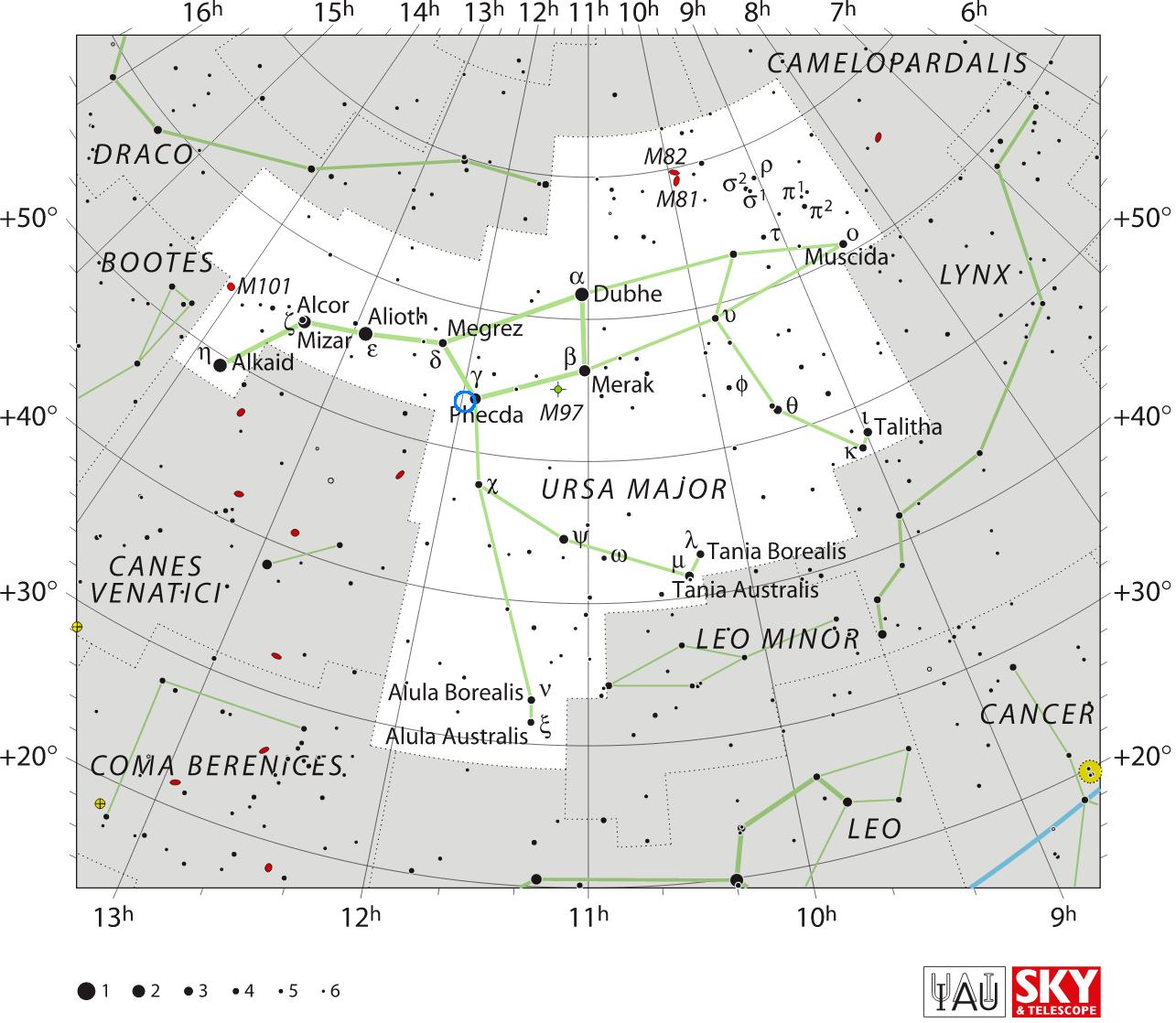
Finder chart for galaxy Messier 109 (circled in blue)

== See also ==
- List of Messier objects
- NGC 1300 – a similar barred spiral galaxy
