= NGC 3985 =

Galaxy in the constellation Ursa Major

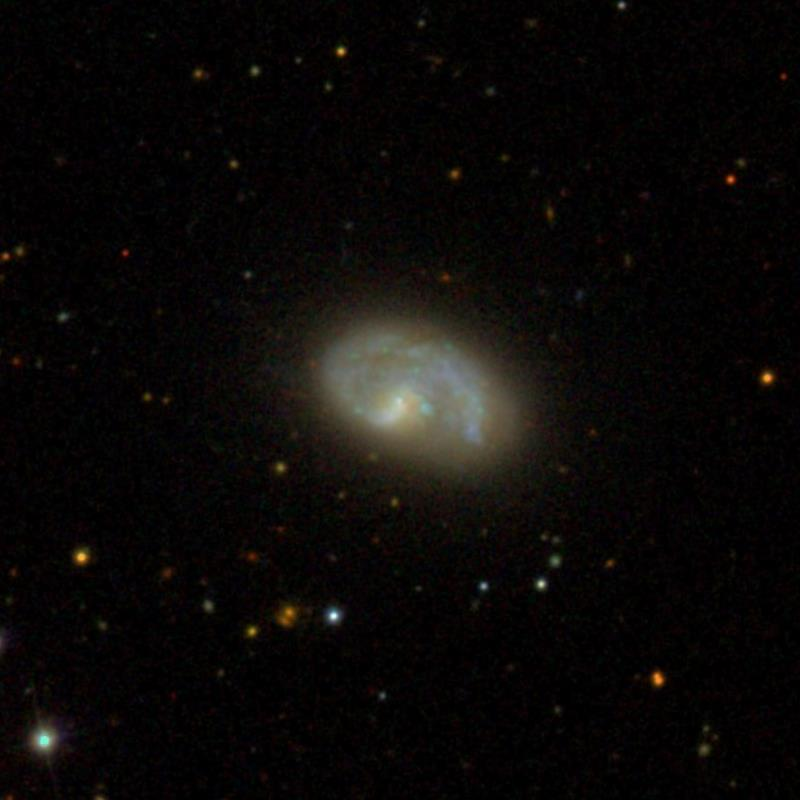
- The barred spiral galaxy NGC 3985

Observation data (J2000 epoch)
- Constellation: Ursa Major
- Right ascension: 11^{h} 56^{m} 42.08^{s}
- Declination: +48° 20′ 02.1″
- Redshift: 0.003163
- Distance: 46.1 ± 13.5 Mly (14.1 ± 4.1 Mpc)
- Apparent magnitude (V): 12.6
- Surface brightness: 21.62 mag/arcsec^{2}

Characteristics
- Type: SB(s)m
- Size: 17,700 ly
- Apparent size (V): 1.3′ × 0.8′

Other designations
- PGC 37542, UGC 6921, MCG +08-22-045, CGCG 243-031, IRAS 11541+4836, ARK 334, KCPG 310

NGC 3985 is a barred spiral galaxy in the constellation Ursa Major. It is located at a distance of about 45 million light years from Earth, which, given its apparent dimensions, means that NGC 3726 is about 18,000 light years across. NGC 3985 is situated north of the celestial equator and, as such, it is more easily visible from the Northern Hemisphere. The galaxy appears to have one spiral arm.

NGC 3985 belongs in the NGC 3877 group, which is part of the south Ursa Major groups, part of the Virgo Supercluster. Other galaxies in the same group are NGC 3726, NGC 3893, NGC 3896, NGC 3906, NGC 3928, NGC 3949, and NGC 4010.
