= NGC 3726 =

Galaxy in the constellation Ursa Major

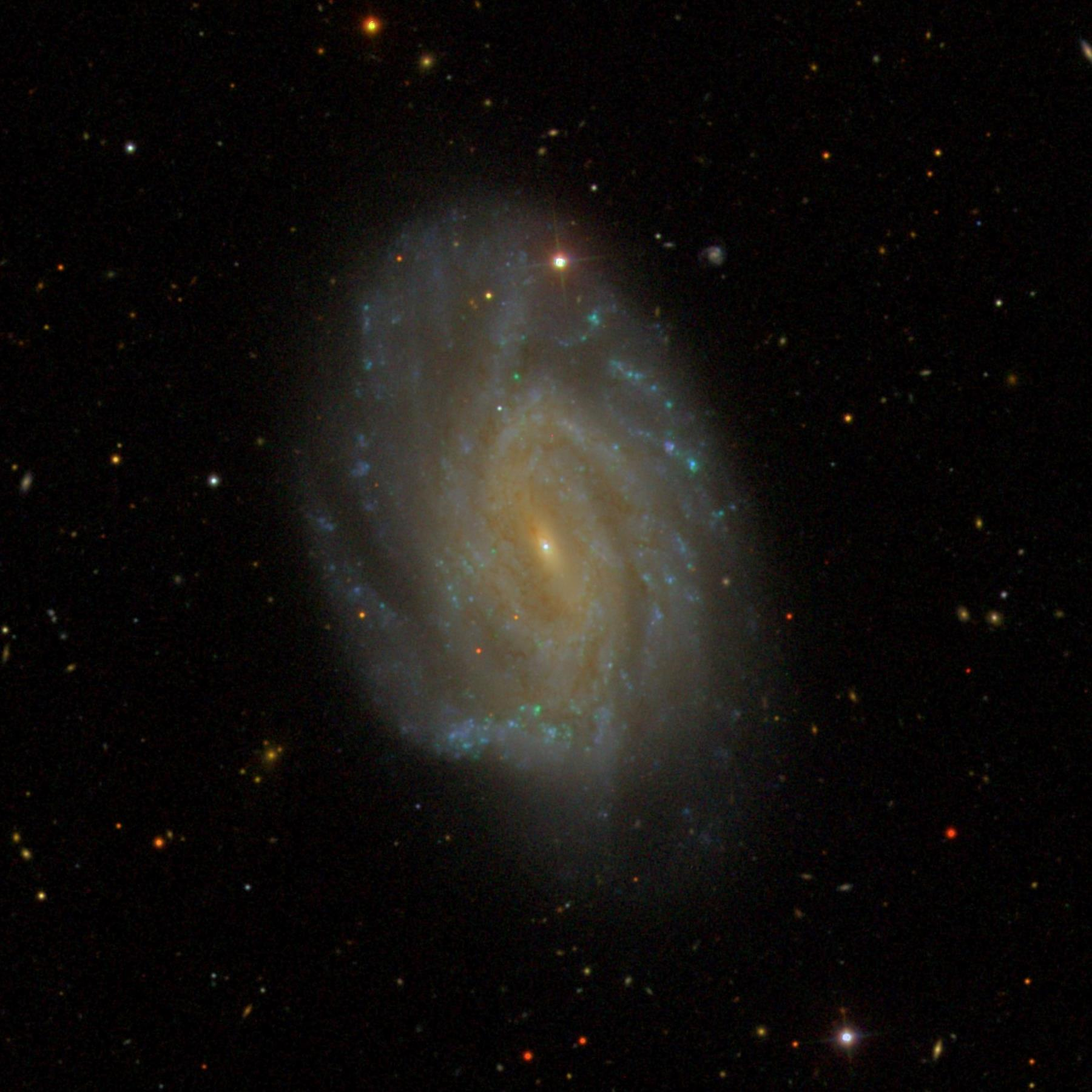
- NGC 3726 imaged by the Sloan Digital Sky Survey

Observation data (J2000 epoch)
- Constellation: Ursa Major
- Right ascension: 11^{h} 33^{m} 21.1^{s}
- Declination: 47° 01′ 45″
- Redshift: 866±1 km/s
- Distance: 46.6 ± 11.2 Mly (14.3 ± 3.4 Mpc)
- Apparent magnitude (V): 10.4

Characteristics
- Type: SAB(r)c
- Apparent size (V): 6.0′ × 4.3′

Other designations
- NGC 3726, UGC 6537, MCG +08-21-051, PGC 35676

NGC 3726 is a barred spiral galaxy located in the northern constellation of Ursa Major. It is located at a distance of circa 45 million light years from Earth, which, given its apparent dimensions, means that NGC 3726 is about 85,000 light years across. It was discovered by German-British astronomer William Herschel on February 5, 1788.

== Structure ==
NGC 3726 is a spiral galaxy with a small bar, seen with medium inclination. The bar is 1.38 arcseconds across and it ends at an inner ring with 1.50 arcseconds diameter. The bluest regions of star formation are located at the ring.

Three arms emanate from the ring. The southern is the brightest and the north is the best defined. The third arm emanates from the east side of the ring, moves towards NNW and then bends sharply to the southwest. The spiral arms are thick and well defined and can be traced for half a revolution. The arms then branch into fragments. The spiral pattern of the galaxy is a bit disturbed and asymmetrical. Numerous bright HII regions are present in the galaxy. The galaxy has a massive dark matter halo.

The nucleus of the galaxy hosts a supermassive black hole with mass 10^{6.5} (3 million) M_{☉}, based on Ks bulge luminosity.

== Nearby galaxies ==
NGC 3726 belongs in the NGC 3877 group, which is part of the south Ursa Major groups, part of the Virgo Supercluster. Other galaxies in the same group are NGC 3893, NGC 3896, NGC 3906, NGC 3928, NGC 3949, NGC 3985, and NGC 4010. It may be also kinematically related with the smaller galaxies NGC 3769 and NGC 3782, located at angular distances 68' and 69' respectively.

== Gallery ==
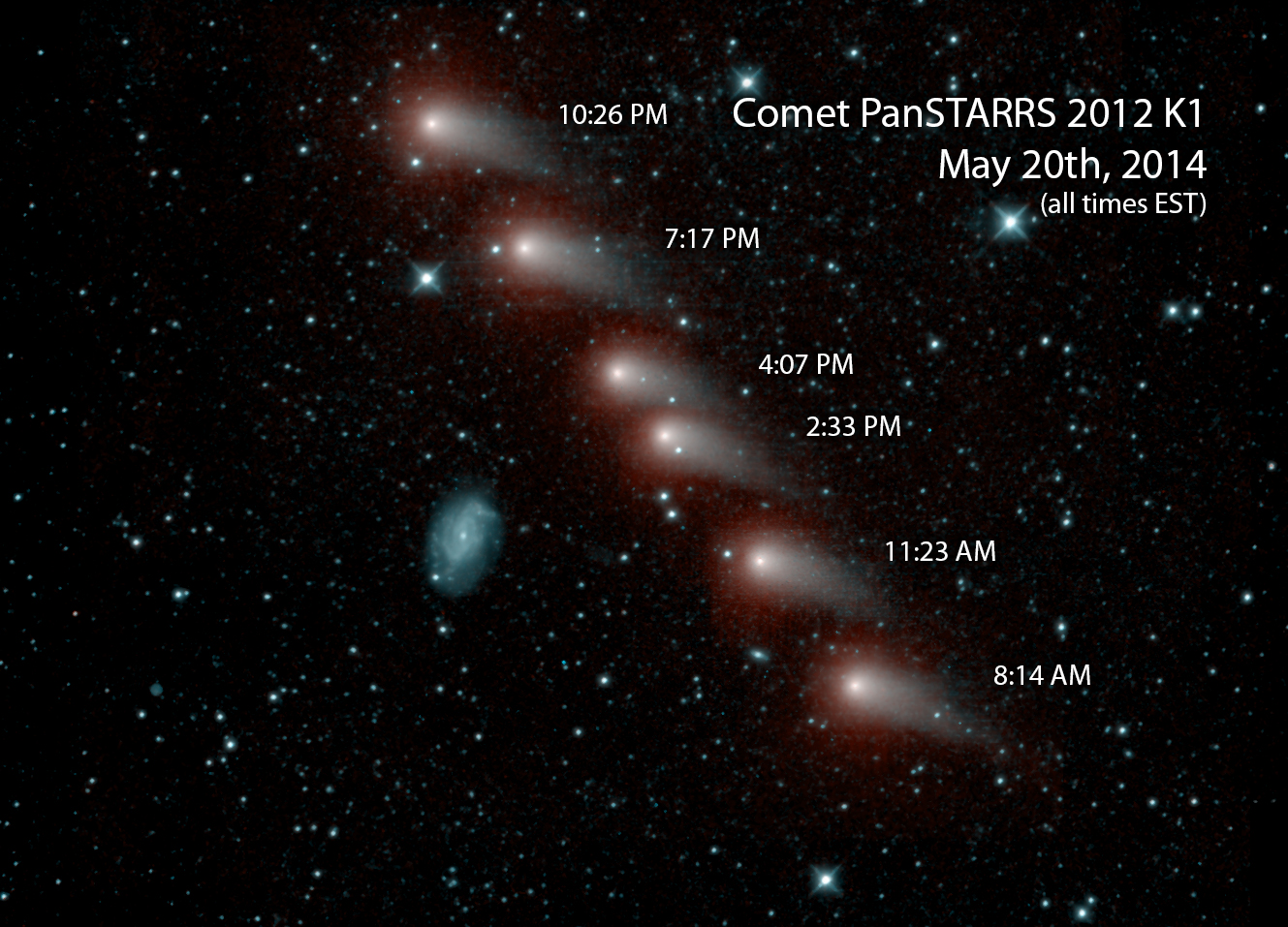
Comet C/2012 K1 passing near NGC 3726 imaged by a NEOWISE series of infrared images
