= NGC 3893 =

Galaxy in the constellation Ursa Major

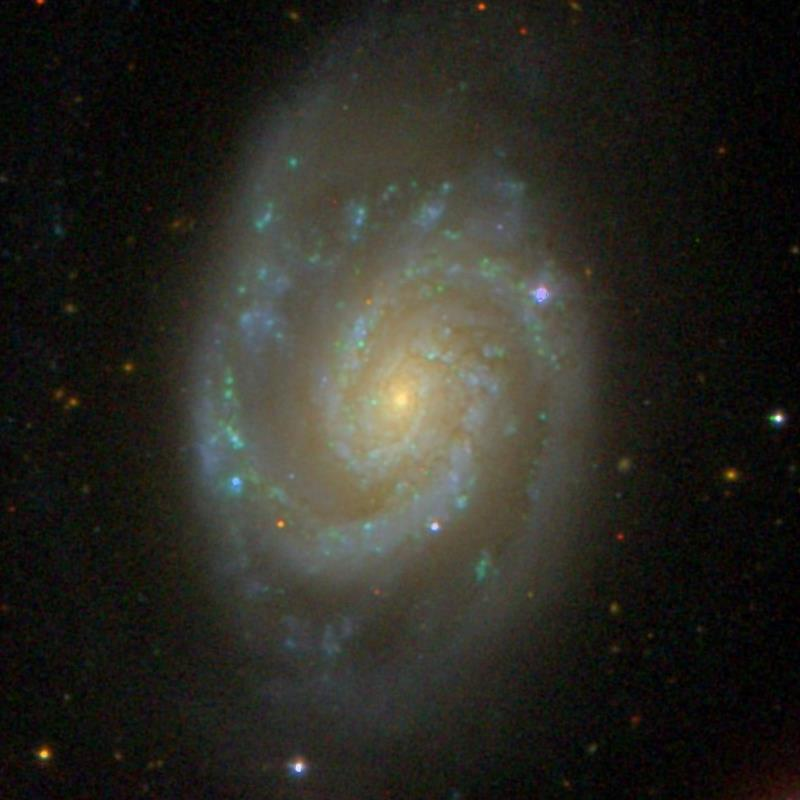
- NGC 3893 as seen by the Sloan Digital Sky Survey

Observation data (J2000 epoch)
- Constellation: Ursa Major
- Right ascension: 11^{h} 48^{m} 38.2^{s}
- Declination: 48° 42′ 39″
- Redshift: 0.003226±0.000003
- Heliocentric radial velocity: 967±1 km/s
- Distance: 51.4 ± 10.4 Mly (15.8 ± 3.2 Mpc)
- Apparent magnitude (V): 10.2

Characteristics
- Type: SAB(rs)c
- Apparent size (V): 4.5′ × 2.8′

Other designations
- NGC 3893, UGC 6778, MCG +08-22-007, PGC 36875

NGC 3893 is a spiral galaxy located in the northern constellation of Ursa Major. It is located at a distance of circa 50 million light years from Earth, which, given its apparent dimensions, means that NGC 3893 is about 70,000 light years across. It was discovered by William Herschel on February 9, 1788. NGC 3893 interacts with its satellite, NGC 3896.

== Characteristics ==
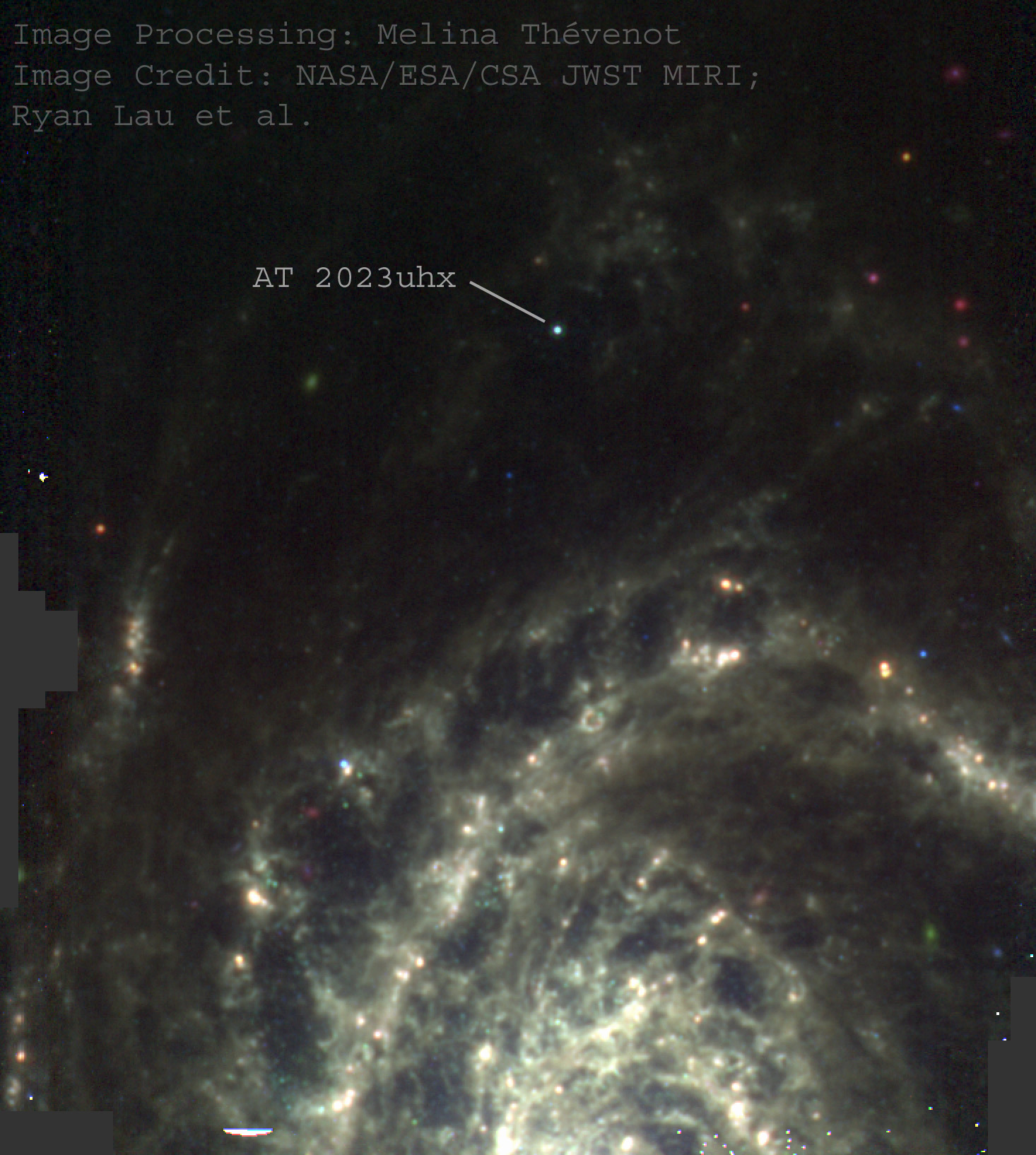
The luminous red nova AT 2023uhx with James Webb Space Telescope MIRI

NGC 3893 is a grand design spiral galaxy. It has two main arms, with high surface brightness and numerous HII regions. A faint spiral arm extends from the south to the north side making an arc on the east side of NGC 3893. The galaxy is categorised as SAB in NED, but Hernández-Toledo and Puerari did not detect a bar in their observations. The stellar disk of NGC 3893 is estimated to have a mass of 2.3 × 10^{10} M_{☉} and dominates gas dynamics in the optical radius. The star formation rate in NGC 3893 is about 5.62 M_{☉}/year.

Although no supernovae have been observed in NGC 3893 yet, Kōichi Itagaki discovered a luminous red nova, designated AT 2023uhx, on 7 October 2023 (type LRN, mag. 17.2).

== Nearby galaxies ==
NGC 3893 interacts with NGC 3896, a smaller galaxy lying at an angular distance of 3.9 arcminutes, and this results in a number of tidal features, like warps and bridges. A bridge of material is observed in HI imaging connecting the two galaxies. A stellar debris bridge is observed at the south side, better seen in B-band images, suggesting it is composed of young stars. The mass ratio between the two galaxies is about 0.025 - 0.031.

NGC 3893 and its smaller companion NGC 3896 are members of the NGC 3877 group, which belongs to the south Ursa Major groups, part of the Virgo Supercluster. NGC 3906 lies 20 arcminutes to the southeast of NGC 3893. Other galaxies in the same group are NGC 3726, NGC 3928, NGC 3949, NGC 3985, and NGC 4010.

== See also ==
- Messier 51 - a similar galaxy pair
