= NGC 4491 =

Galaxy in the constellation of Virgo

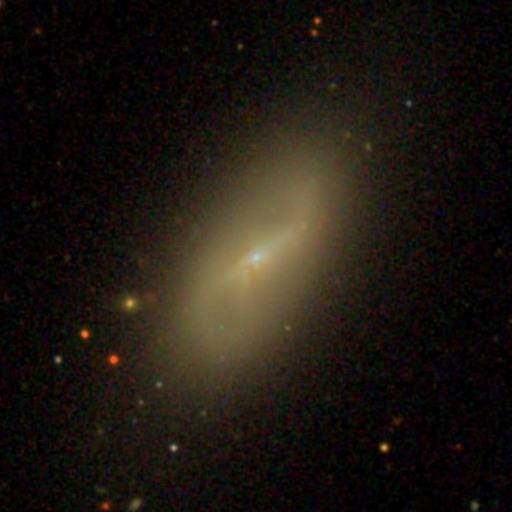
- SDSS image of NGC 4491.

Observation data (J2000 epoch)
- Constellation: Virgo
- Right ascension: 12^{h} 30^{m} 57.1^{s}
- Declination: 11° 29′ 01″
- Redshift: 0.001658/497 km/s
- Distance: 55,420,000 ly
- Group or cluster: Virgo Cluster
- Apparent magnitude (V): 13.5

Characteristics
- Type: SB(s)a
- Size: ~7,140 ly (estimated)
- Apparent size (V): 1.7 x 0.9

Other designations
- PGC 41376, UGC 7657, VCC 1326

NGC 4491 is a dwarf barred spiral galaxy located about 55 million light-years away in the constellation Virgo. NGC 4491 was discovered by astronomer William Herschel on March 15, 1784. NGC 4491 is located in a subgroup of the Virgo Cluster centered on Messier 87 known as the Virgo A subgroup.

== Tidal interactions ==
NGC 4491 is a strongly barred galaxy. The bar may have grown from the tidal influence of other galaxies in the Virgo Cluster.

== Possible Seyfert activity ==
The infrared-radio properties of NGC 4491 possibly suggest the presence of an AGN in the galaxy. However, spectral analysis of the galaxy does not support this view since emission lines are absent or very weak and narrow.

== See also ==
- List of NGC objects (4001–5000)
- Dwarf galaxy
