= NGC 4118 =

Galaxy in the constellation Canes Venatici

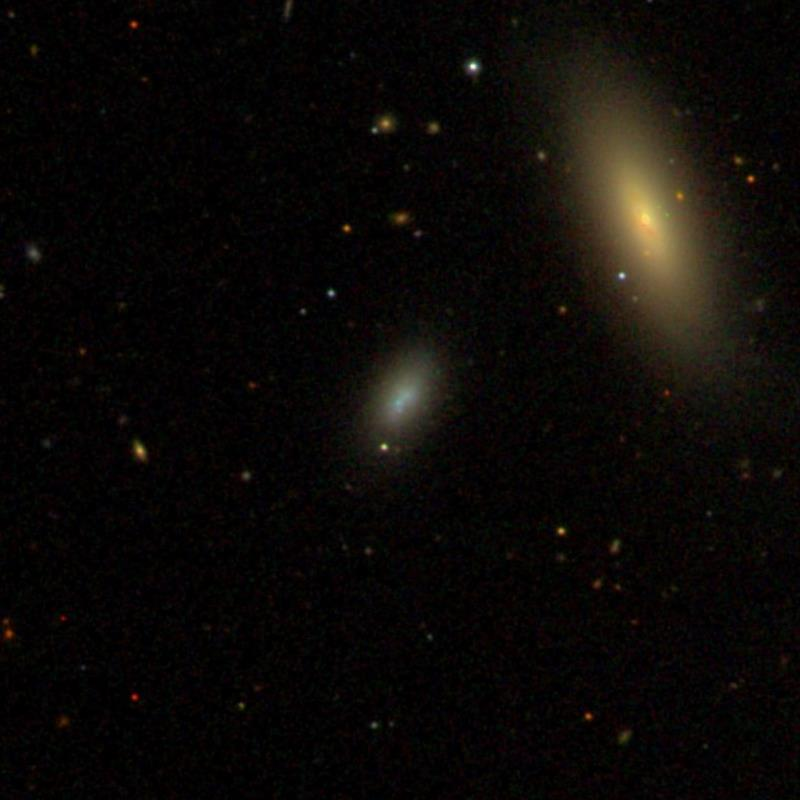
- SDSS image of NGC 4118.The galaxy at the top right is NGC 4117

Observation data (2000.0 epoch)
- Constellation: Ursa Major
- Right ascension: 12^{h} 07^{m} 52.9^{s}
- Declination: 43° 06′ 39″
- Redshift: 0.002126
- Heliocentric radial velocity: 637 km/s
- Distance: 39 Mly (11.9 Mpc)
- Apparent magnitude (V): 15.6
- Absolute magnitude (B): -15.44

Characteristics
- Type: S0+
- Size: ~8,100 ly (2.48 kpc) (estimated)
- Apparent size (V): 0.70 × 0.41

Other designations
- CGCG 215-030, MCG +07-25-028, PGC 038507

NGC 4118 is a dwarf lenticular galaxy located approximately 63 million light-years away in the constellation Canes Venatici. It was discovered April 20, 1857 by R. J. Mitchell. NGC 4118 is a star forming dwarf galaxy, and is connected to the galaxy NGC 4111, along with the nearby NGC 4117, by disturbed H I from NGC 4111.

NGC 4118 is a companion of the galaxy NGC 4117, with both galaxies being members of the NGC 4111 Group which is part of the Ursa Major Cloud.

== See also ==
- List of NGC objects (3001–4000)
- NGC 4111
