= NGC 812 =

Spiral galaxy in the constellation Andromeda

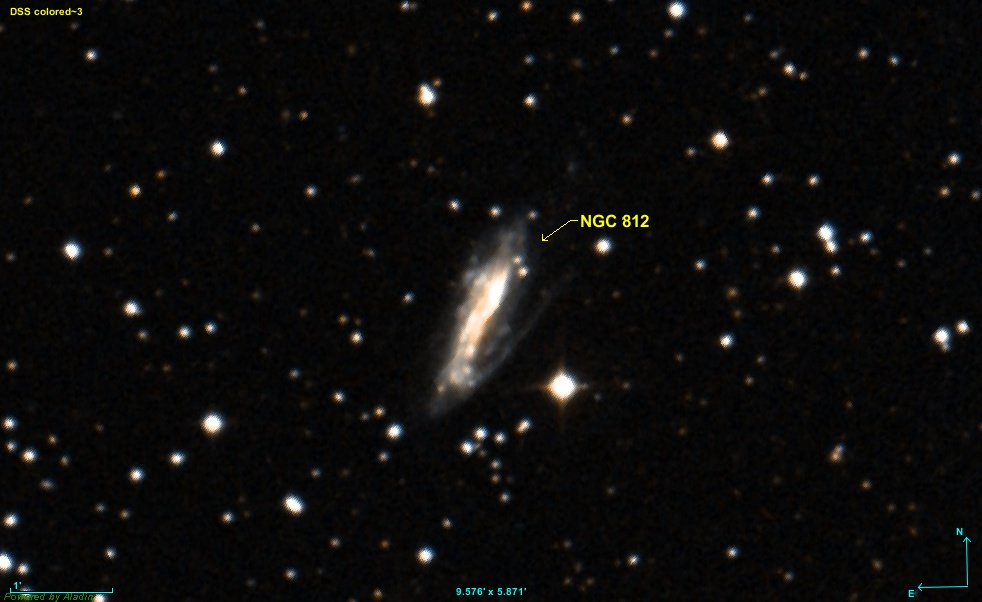
- DSS image of NGC 812

Observation data (J2000 epoch)
- Constellation: Andromeda
- Right ascension: 02^{h} 06^{m} 51.497^{s}
- Declination: +44° 34′ 22.48″
- Redshift: 0.017469
- Heliocentric radial velocity: 5191 km/s
- Distance: 174.4 Mly (53.46 Mpc)
- Apparent magnitude (B): 12.8

Characteristics
- Type: S pec

Other designations
- UGC 1598, MCG +07-05-014, PGC 8066

NGC 812 is a spiral galaxy located in the constellation Andromeda, an estimated 175 million light-years from the Milky Way. NGC 812 was discovered on December 11, 1876 by astronomer Édouard Stephan.

== Supernovae ==
Two supernovae have been observed in NGC 812:

- SN 2010jj (Type IIn, mag. 17) was discovered by Doug Rich on 3 November 2010.
- SN 2020udy (Type Iax[02cx-like], mag. 19.6) was discovered by Jakob Nordin and Daniel Perley on 24 September 2020.

== LGG 46 Group ==
It is part of a galaxy group known as LGG 46. It has at least 3 members, which are NGC 812, NGC 846 and UGC 1686.

== See also ==
- List of NGC objects (1–1000)
