= NGC 7064 =

Galaxy in the constellation Indus

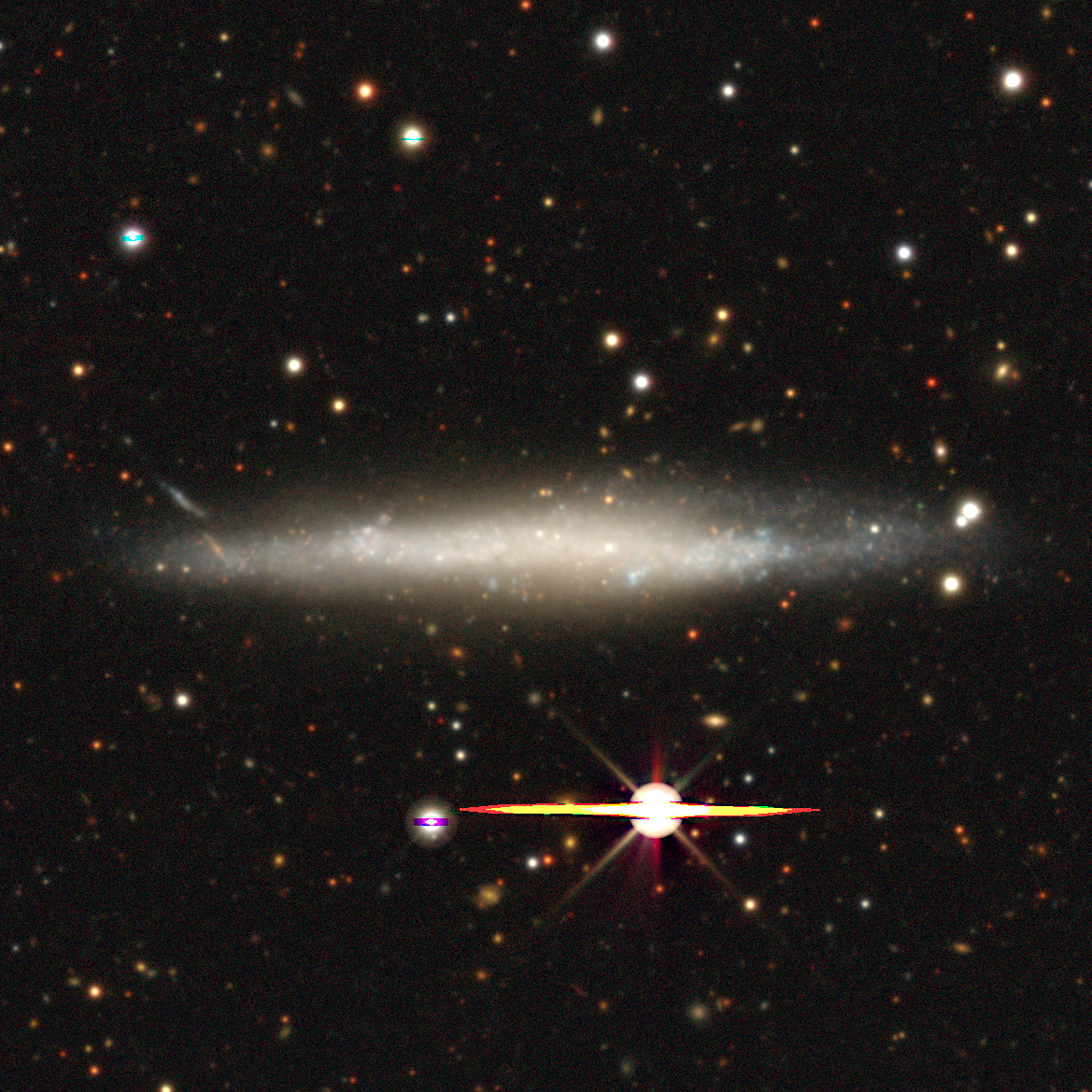
- The galaxy NGC 7064 as imaged by legacy surveys .

Observation data (J2000 epoch)
- Constellation: Indus
- Right ascension: 21^{h} 29^{m} 03.0^{s}
- Declination: −52° 46′ 03″
- Redshift: 0.002659
- Heliocentric radial velocity: 797 km/s
- Distance: 35.86 Mly
- Apparent magnitude (V): 13.1

Characteristics
- Type: SB(s)c
- Size: ~51,200 ly (estimated)
- Apparent size (V): 3.8 x 0.6

Other designations
- ESO 188-9, IRAS 21255-5259, PGC 66836

NGC 7064 is a nearby edge-on barred spiral galaxy located about 35 million light-years away in the constellation of Indus. NGC 7064 has an estimated diameter of 51,000 light-years. NGC 7064 was discovered by astronomer John Herschel on July 8, 1834.

== See also ==
- NGC 4013
- List of NGC objects (7001–7840)
