= NGC 3448 =

Irregular galaxy in the constellation Ursa Major

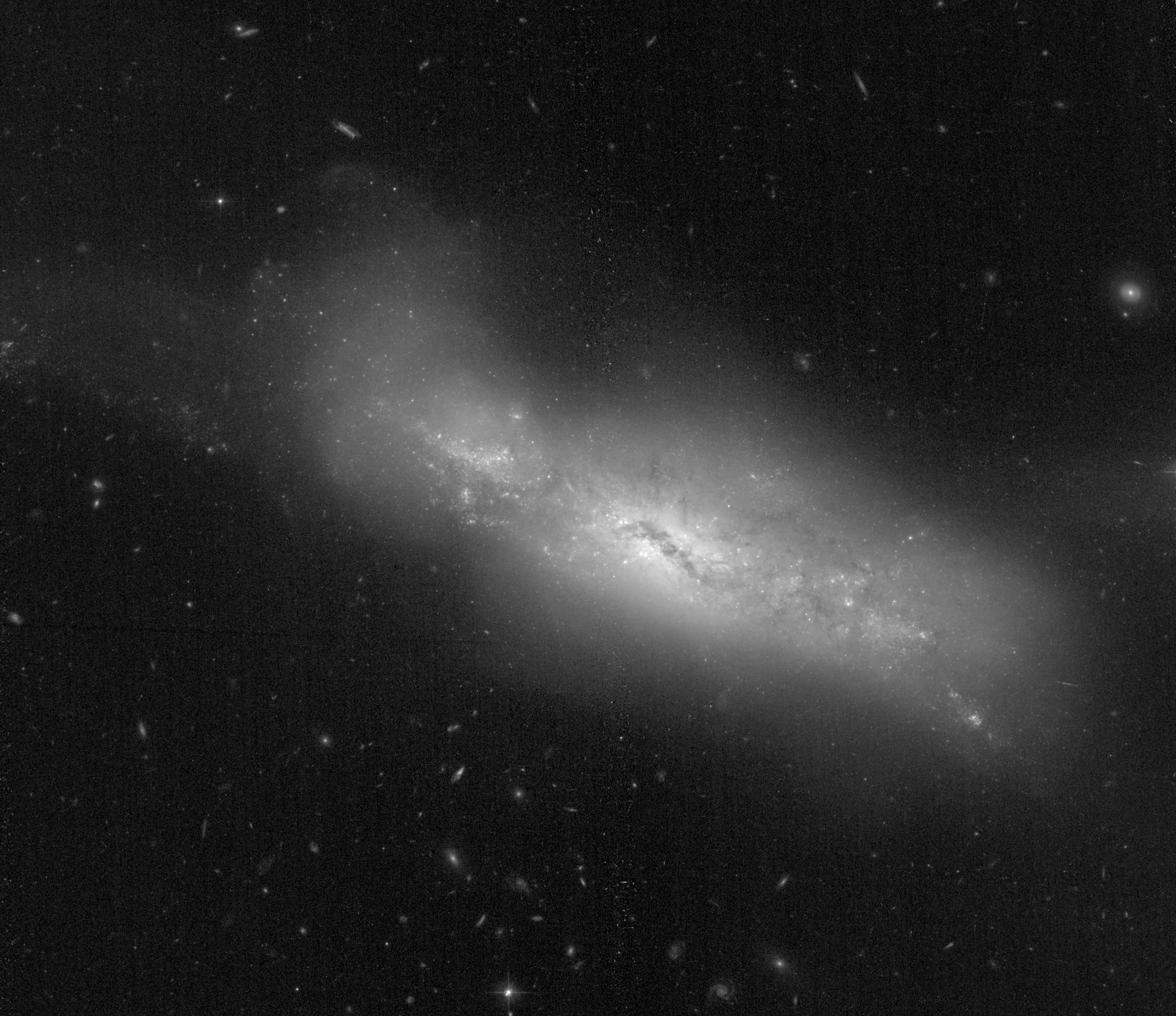
- NGC 3448 by Hubble Space Telescope

Observation data (J2000 epoch)
- Constellation: Ursa Major
- Right ascension: 10^{h} 54^{m} 39.2^{s}
- Declination: +54° 18′ 18″
- Redshift: 0.004503 ± 0.000017
- Heliocentric radial velocity: 1,350 ± 5 km/s
- Distance: 77.4 ± 3.5 Mly (23.75 ± 1.06 Mpc)
- Apparent magnitude (V): 11.6

Characteristics
- Type: I0
- Apparent size (V): 5.6′ × 1.8′
- Notable features: Interacting galaxy

Other designations
- UGC 6024, Arp 205, MCG +09-18-055, IRAS 10516+5434, PGC 32774, 7C 1051+5434

NGC 3448 is an irregular galaxy in the constellation Ursa Major. The galaxy lies about 75 million light years away from Earth, which means, given its apparent dimensions, that NGC 3448 is approximately 125,000 light years across. It was discovered by William Herschel on April 17, 1789.

== Characteristics ==
The galaxy is seen edge-on and is categorised as an amorphous galaxy with material ejected from nucleus in the Atlas of Peculiar Galaxies. The galaxy interacts with UGC 6016, a dwarf barred spiral galaxy with low surface brightness which appears perturbated. UGC 6016 lies 3.9 arcminutes away from NGC 3448. There is material between the two galaxies, probably tidal debris, and a tidal plume emanates from the side of NGC 3448 opposite of UGC 6016. Noreau and Kronberg in 1986 found there is non-continuous hydrogen bridge between the two galaxies though. The bridge is also visible in near ultraviolet.

The galaxy has a central dust lane that lies at an angle of 20° with respect to the rest of the galaxy. A series of radio sources lie along the dust lane that could be supernova remnants, indicating the galaxy is undergoing intense star formation fueled by the tidal interaction. The total star formation rate is estimated to be 1.371+0.065
−0.047 M_{☉} per year. A spiral arm is visible in radiowaves, with one more possibly present in the other side of the nucleus. The dynamics of NGC 3448 are perturbated due to tidal interaction and material is reintergrating to the galaxy, obscuring parts of the galaxy in visible light. The galaxy has a warped hydrogen disk that extends beyond the visual one, along with the tidal plumes.

== Supernova ==
One supernova has been observed in NGC 3448, SN 2014G. The supernova was discovered by Kōichi Itagaki on 14 January 2014, when it had an apparent magnitude of 15.6. The spectrum of the supernova indicates it was a Type II supernova, with initial spectra indicating a Type IIn while during its light curve post maximum indicates it was a Type II-L.

== Gallery ==
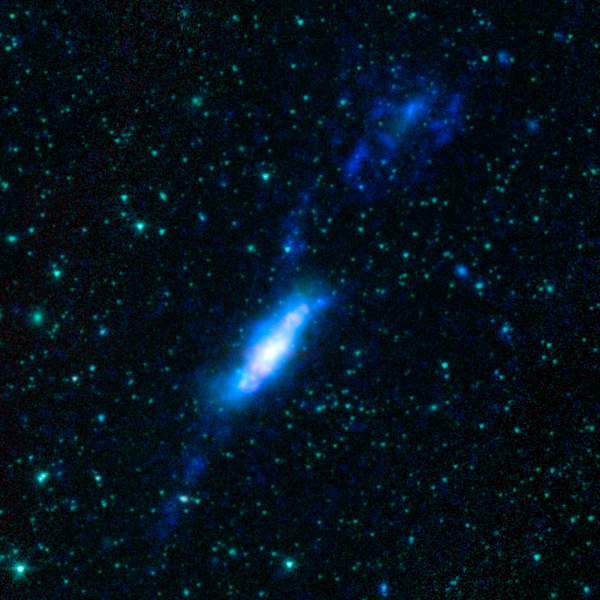
NGC 3448 and UGC 6016 in ultraviolet by GALEX and infrared by Spitzer Space Telescope

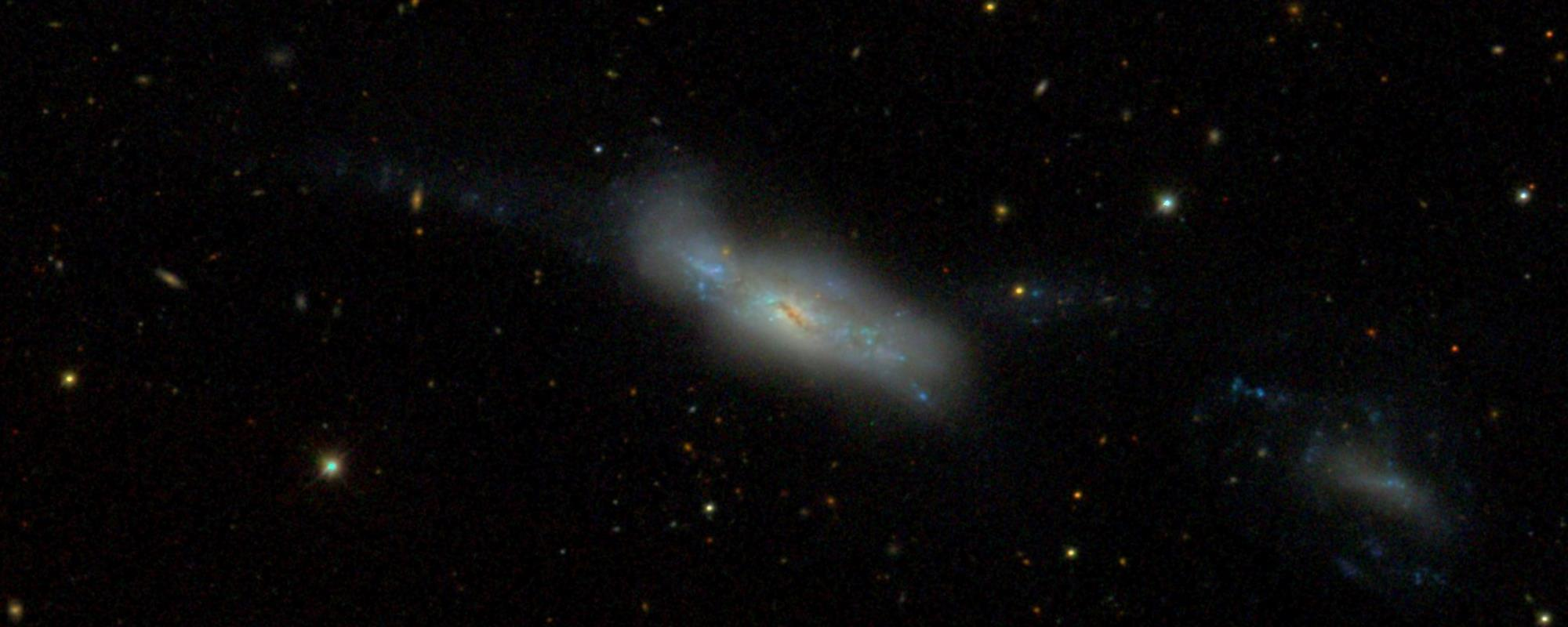
NGC 3448 by Sloan Digital Sky Survey
