= NGC 3950 =

Elliptical galaxy of type E in Ursa Major

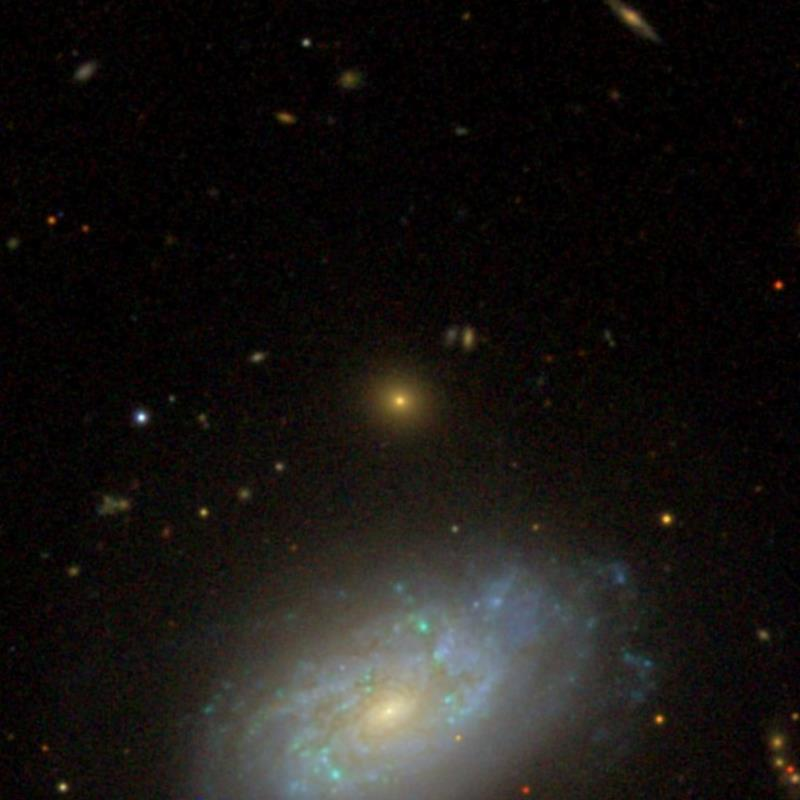
- SDSS image of NGC 3950 and NGC 3949

Observation data (J2000 epoch)
- Constellation: Ursa Major
- Right ascension: 11h 53m 41.41s
- Declination: +47d 53m 04.46s
- Redshift: 0.074602
- Heliocentric radial velocity: 22,365 km/s
- Distance: 1.030 Gly (315 Mpc)
- Apparent magnitude (V): 15.7
- Apparent magnitude (B): 16.7
- Surface brightness: 13.2

Characteristics
- Type: E, E0;cand. dwarf
- Apparent size (V): 0.30' x 0.3'

Other designations
- PGC 37294, MCG +08-22-030, BTS 051, HOLM 301B

NGC 3950 is an elliptical galaxy of type E, in Ursa Major. Its redshift is 0.074602, meaning NGC 3950 is 1.03 billion light-years or 316 Mpc from Earth, which is within the Hubble distance values. This high redshift makes NGC 3950 one of the furthest New General Catalogue objects.

NGC 3950 has apparent dimensions of 0.30 x 0.3 arcmin, meaning the galaxy is 90,000 light-years across. It was discovered by Lawrence Parsons on April 27, 1875, and he described it as, "extremely faint, 2.6 arcmin north of h 1009".

In a research article published in 1990, NGC 3950 was believed to be a dwarf galaxy, and a close companion of a larger spiral galaxy, NGC 3949. But further research involving measuring its redshift in 2005 showed NGC 3950 is much further away in the background. Together with NGC 3949, they both form an optical galaxy pair called HOLM 301.
