= NGC 4237 =

Galaxy in the constellation Coma Berenices

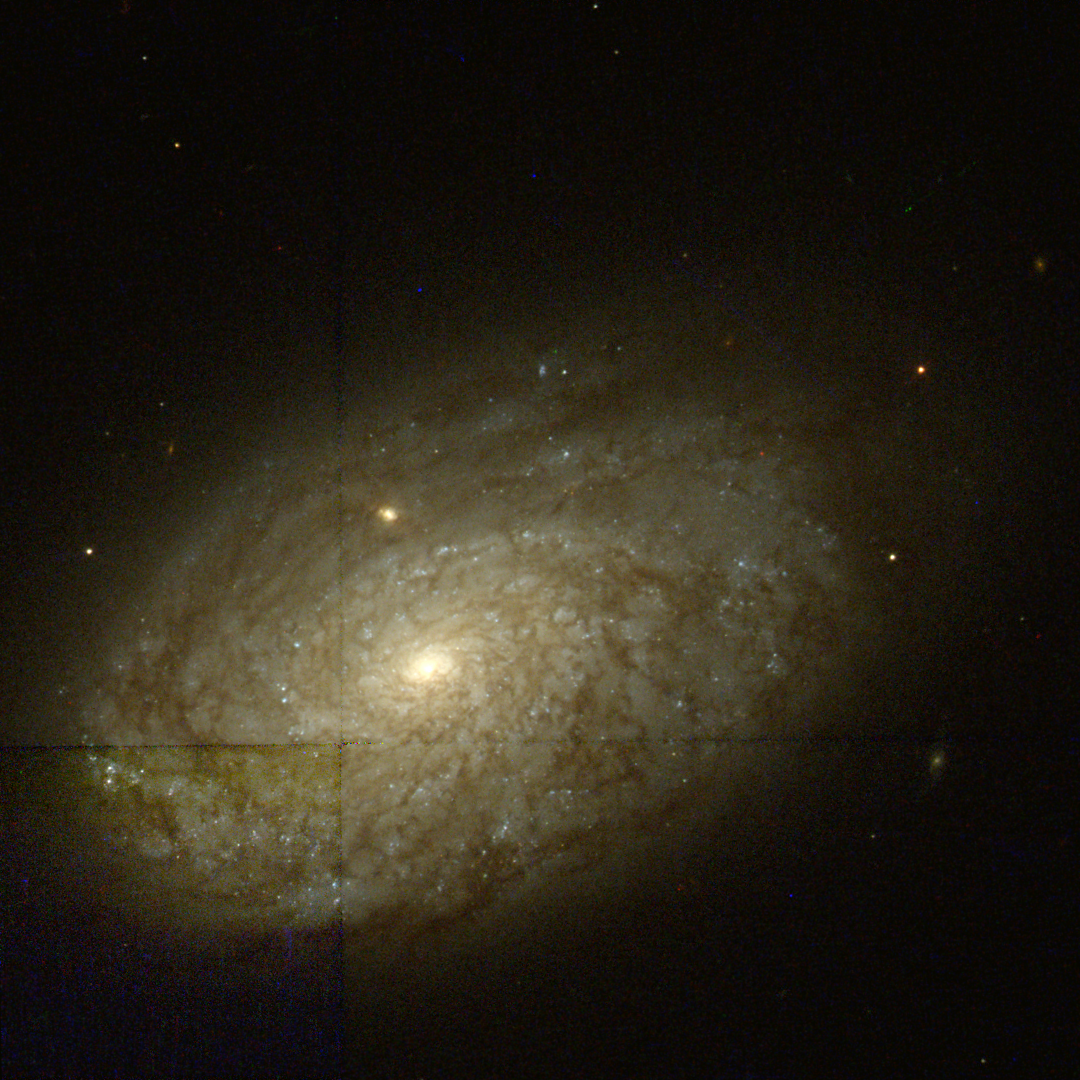
- HST image of NGC 4237.

Observation data (J2000 epoch)
- Constellation: Coma Berenices
- Right ascension: 12^{h} 17^{m} 11.4^{s}
- Declination: 15° 19′ 26″
- Redshift: 0.002892
- Heliocentric radial velocity: 867 km/s
- Distance: 59 Mly (18.1 Mpc)
- Group or cluster: Virgo Cluster
- Apparent magnitude (V): 12.4

Characteristics
- Type: SAB(rs)bc, LINER
- Size: ~50,100 ly (15.35 kpc) (estimated)
- Apparent size (V): 2.33 x 1.07

Other designations
- CGCG 98-130, IRAS 12146+1536, MCG 3-31-91, PGC 39393, UGC 7315, VCC 226

NGC 4237 is a flocculent spiral galaxy located about 60 million light-years away in the constellation Coma Berenices. The galaxy was discovered by astronomer William Herschel on December 30, 1783 and is a member of the Virgo Cluster. It is also classified as a LINER galaxy and as a Seyfert galaxy.

NGC 4237 appears to be deficient in neutral atomic hydrogen (H I). This, combined with its large projected distance from M87 and its radial velocity close to the Virgo Cluster mean suggests that the galaxy may be on a highly radial orbit through the center of the cluster.

== Gallery ==
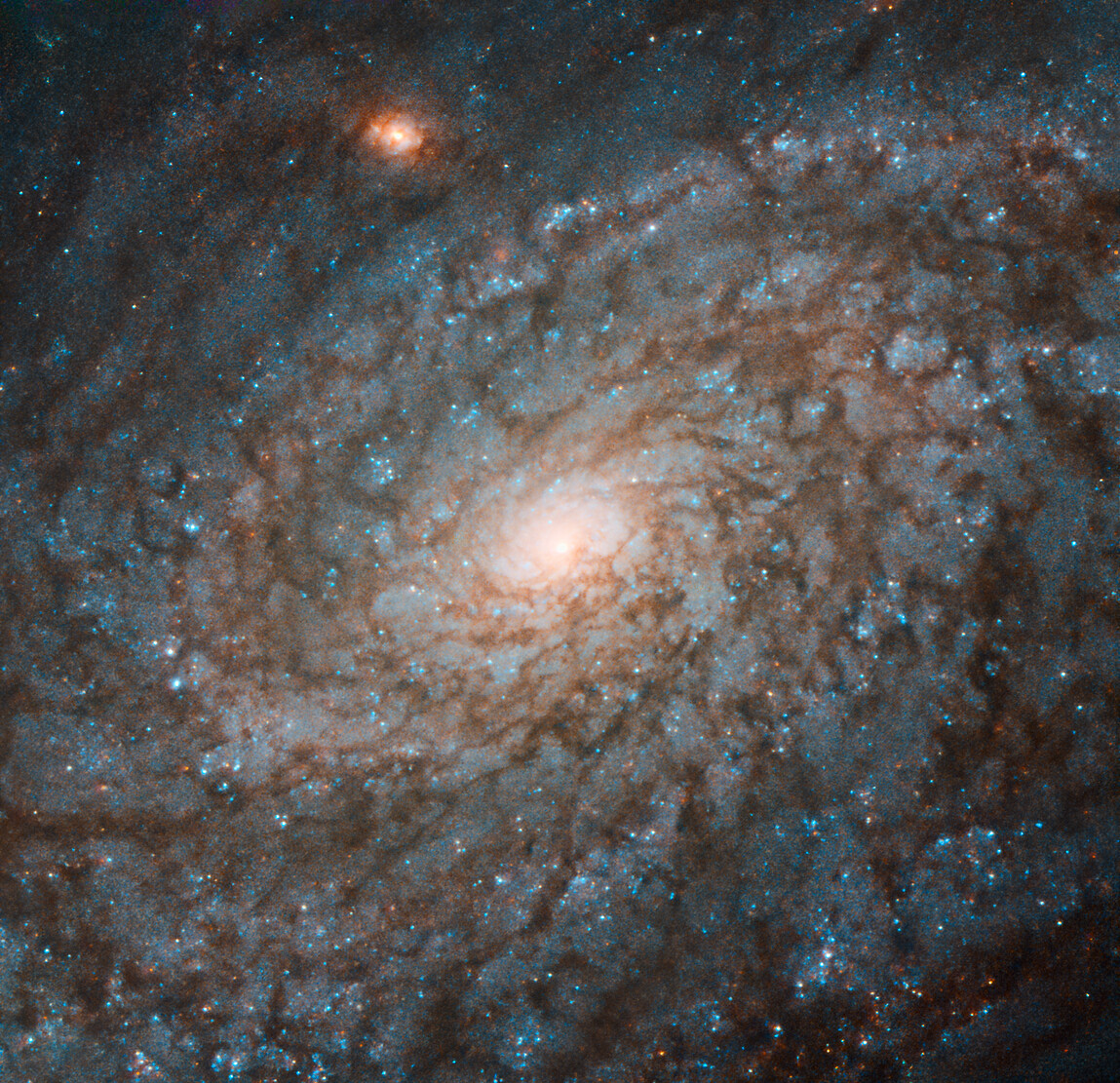
The galaxy NGC 4237.

== See also ==
- List of NGC objects (4001–5000)
- NGC 4212
