= NGC 4138 =

Galaxy in the constellation Canes Venatici

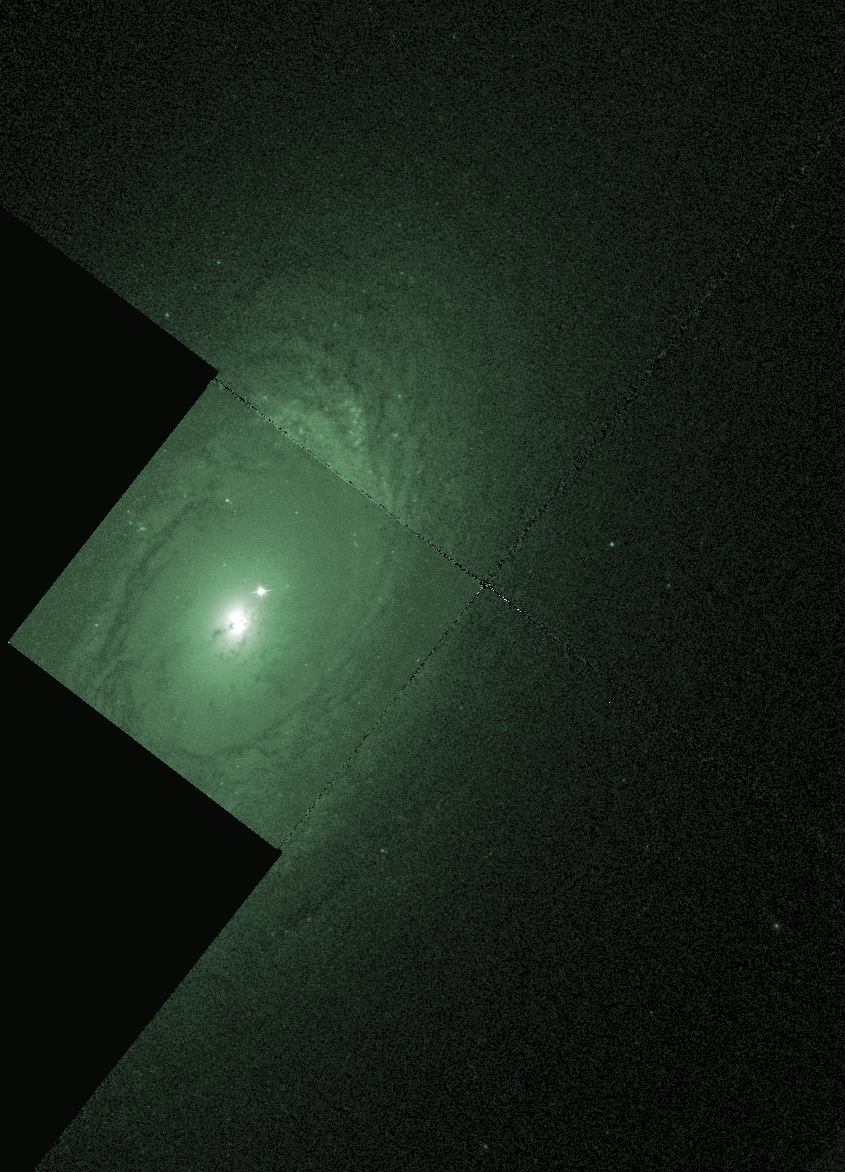
- Image of NGC 4138 taken by the Hubble Space Telescope in green light (547 nm).

Observation data (J2000 epoch)
- Constellation: Canes Venatici
- Right ascension: 12^{h} 09^{m} 29.788^{s}
- Declination: +43° 41′ 07.14″
- Redshift: 0.002962
- Heliocentric radial velocity: 872
- Distance: 52 Mly (16.0 Mpc)
- Apparent magnitude (V): 11.32
- Apparent magnitude (B): 12.16

Characteristics
- Type: SA0^{+}(r)
- Apparent size (V): 2.087′ × 1.252′

Other designations
- 2MASX J12092978+4341071, LEDA 38643, UGC 7139, UZC J120929.9+434107, Z 215-37.

NGC 4138 is the New General Catalogue identifier for a lenticular galaxy in the northern constellation of Canes Venatici. Located around 52 million light years from Earth, it spans some 2.1 × 1.3 arc minutes and has an apparent visual magnitude of 11.3. The morphological classification of NGC 4138 is SA0^{+}(r), indicating it lacks a bar formation and has tightly wound spiral arms with a ring-like structure around the nucleus. It has no nearby companion galaxies.

This is a Seyfert 1.9 galaxy with an active galactic nucleus, having radio emissions detected in its nuclear region. Two radio sources have been detected, with the eastern component being the brighter at 1.0 mJy while the fainter source is emitting 0.75 mJy. This radiation is most likely coming from jets of energetic material being ejected by a central black hole.

In 1996 it was revealed that this galaxy has a counter-rotating disk; around 20% of the stars in the galaxy are rotating in the opposite direction from the other 80%. The neutral and ionized gas in this galaxy are rotating in the same direction as the counter-rotating disk, and the stars in this group are generally younger than the main stellar population. This disk may have formed as the result of a merger with a gas-rich dwarf galaxy some four billion years ago. Simulations indicate that the counter-rotation of this disk is acting to suppress spiral arm features in the galaxy as a whole. The young, star-forming ring structure is likely the result of collisions between gas clouds rotating in the opposite directions.

NGC 4138 is a member of the NGC 4111 Group, which is part of the Ursa Major Cloud and is the second largest group in the cloud after the NGC 3992 Group.

== Gallery ==
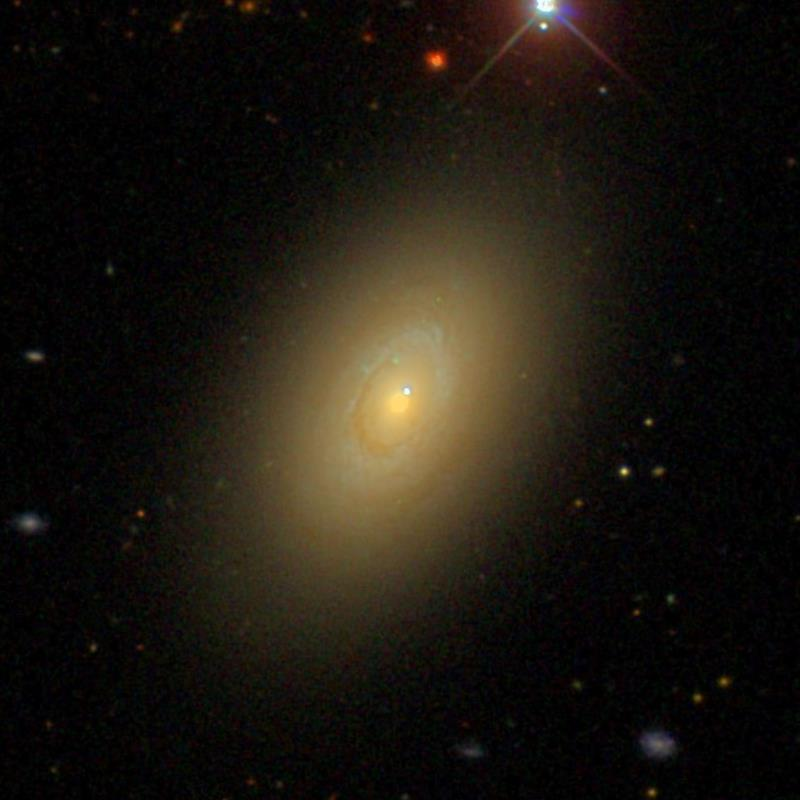
NGC 4138 (SDSS DR14)

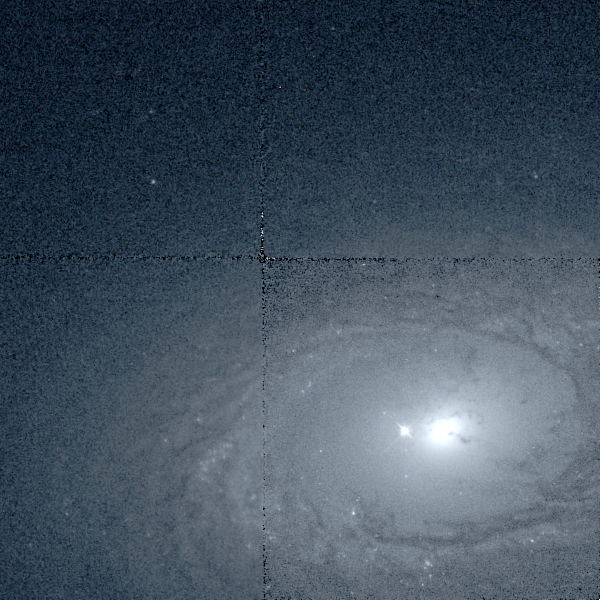
NGC 4138 (HST)
