= NGC 4212 =

Galaxy in the constellation Coma Berenices

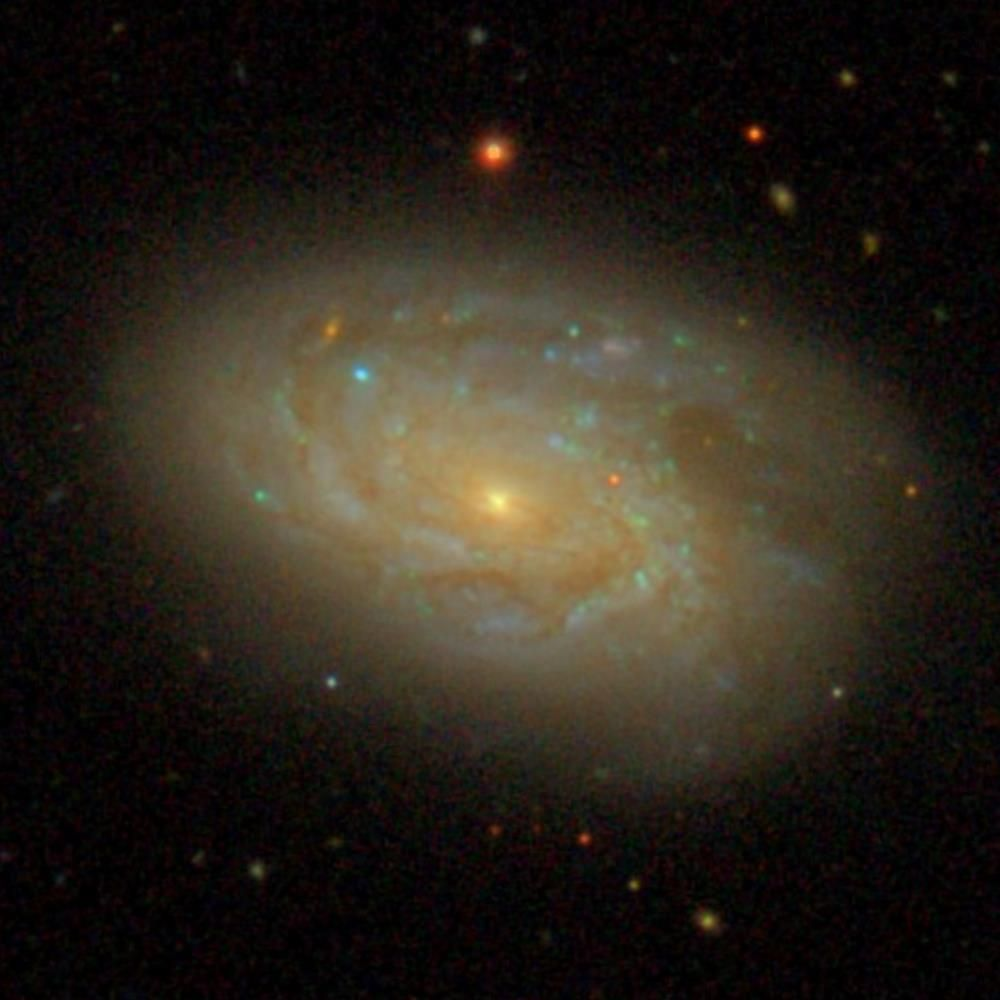
- SDSS image of NGC 4212.

Observation data (J2000 epoch)
- Constellation: Coma Berenices
- Right ascension: 12^{h} 15^{m} 39.3^{s}
- Declination: 13° 54′ 05″
- Redshift: -0.000270 (minus sign indicates blueshift)
- Heliocentric radial velocity: -81 km/s
- Distance: 53 Mly (16.4 Mpc)
- Group or cluster: Virgo Cluster
- Apparent magnitude (V): 11.83

Characteristics
- Type: SAc, LINER
- Size: ~55,000 ly (17 kpc) (estimated)
- Apparent size (V): 3.2 x 1.9

Other designations
- NGC 4208, CGCG 69-110, IRAS 12130+1411, MCG 2-31-70, PGC 39224, UGC 7275, VCC 157

NGC 4212 is a flocculent spiral galaxy with LINER activity located about 53 million light-years away in the constellation Coma Berenices. The galaxy was discovered by astronomer William Herschel on April 8, 1784, and was listed in the NGC catalog as NGC 4208. He then observed the same galaxy and listed it as NGC 4212. Astronomer John Louis Emil Dreyer later concluded that NGC 4208 was identical to NGC 4212. NGC 4212 is a member of the Virgo Cluster.

== See also ==
- List of NGC objects (4001–5000)
- NGC 4414
- NGC 4051 - similar looking galaxy
