= NGC 625 =

Galaxy in the constellation of Phoenix

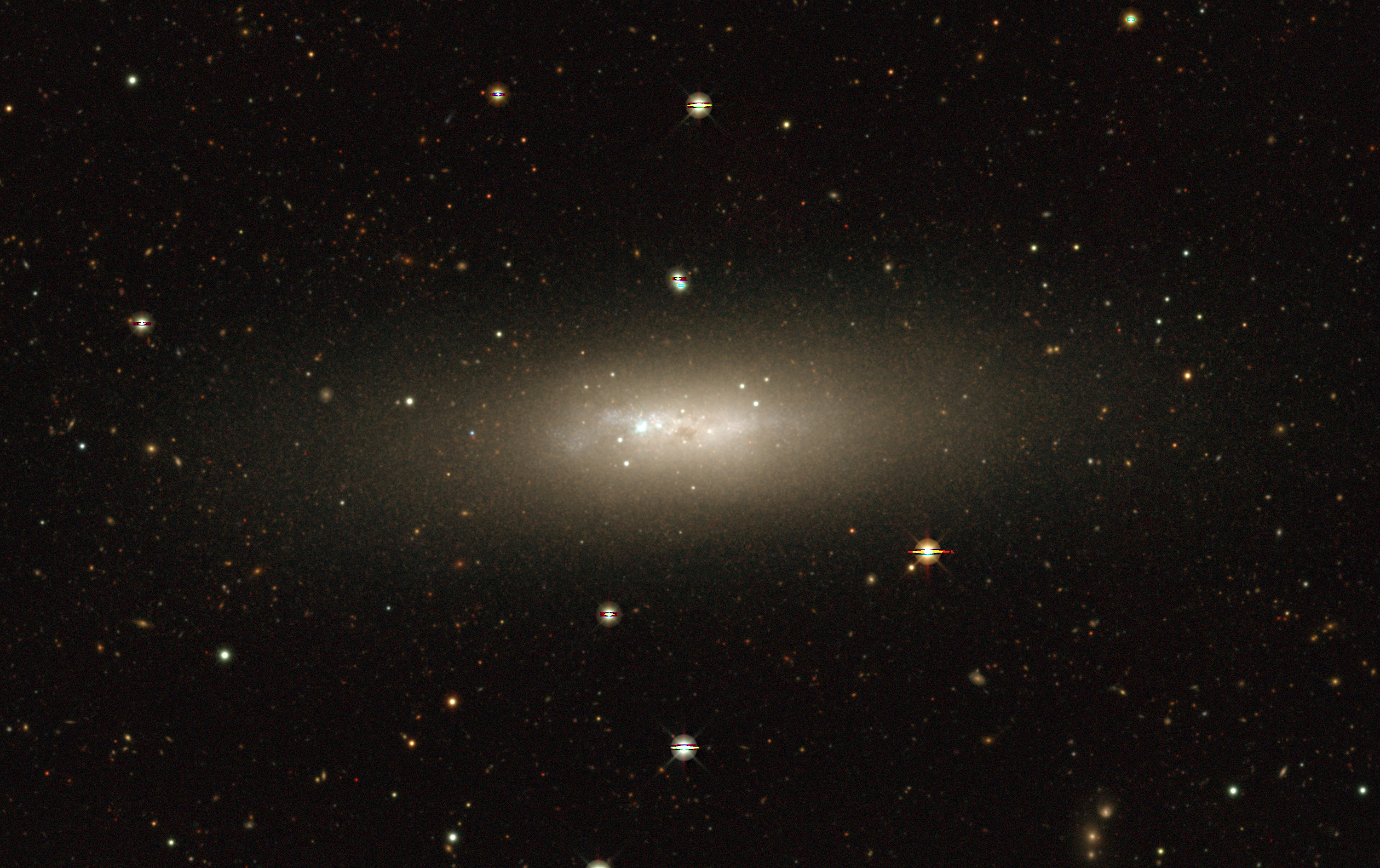
- NGC 625 imaged by the Legacy Surveys Sky Viewer

Observation data (J2000 epoch)
- Constellation: Phoenix
- Right ascension: 01^{h} 35^{m} 04.6^{s}
- Declination: −41° 26′ 10″
- Redshift: 396 ± 1 km/s
- Distance: 12.7 ± 1.3 Mly (3900 ± 0.4 kpc)
- Apparent magnitude (V): 11.7

Characteristics
- Type: SB(s)m?
- Apparent size (V): 5.8′ × 1.9′

Other designations
- ESO 297- G 005, IRAS 01329-4141, 2MASX J01350463-4126103, MCG -07-04-017, PGC 5896

NGC 625 is a dwarf barred spiral galaxy about 12.7 Mly away in the constellation Phoenix. It was discovered on 2 September 1826 by Scottish astronomer James Dunlop. NGC 625 is a member of the Sculptor Group.

NGC 625 has an active galactic nucleus, i.e. a compact region at the center that emits a significant amount of energy across the electromagnetic spectrum, with characteristics indicating that this luminosity is not produced by the stars.

== See also ==
- List of NGC objects (1–1000)
