= NGC 4183 =

Galaxy in constellation Canes Venatici

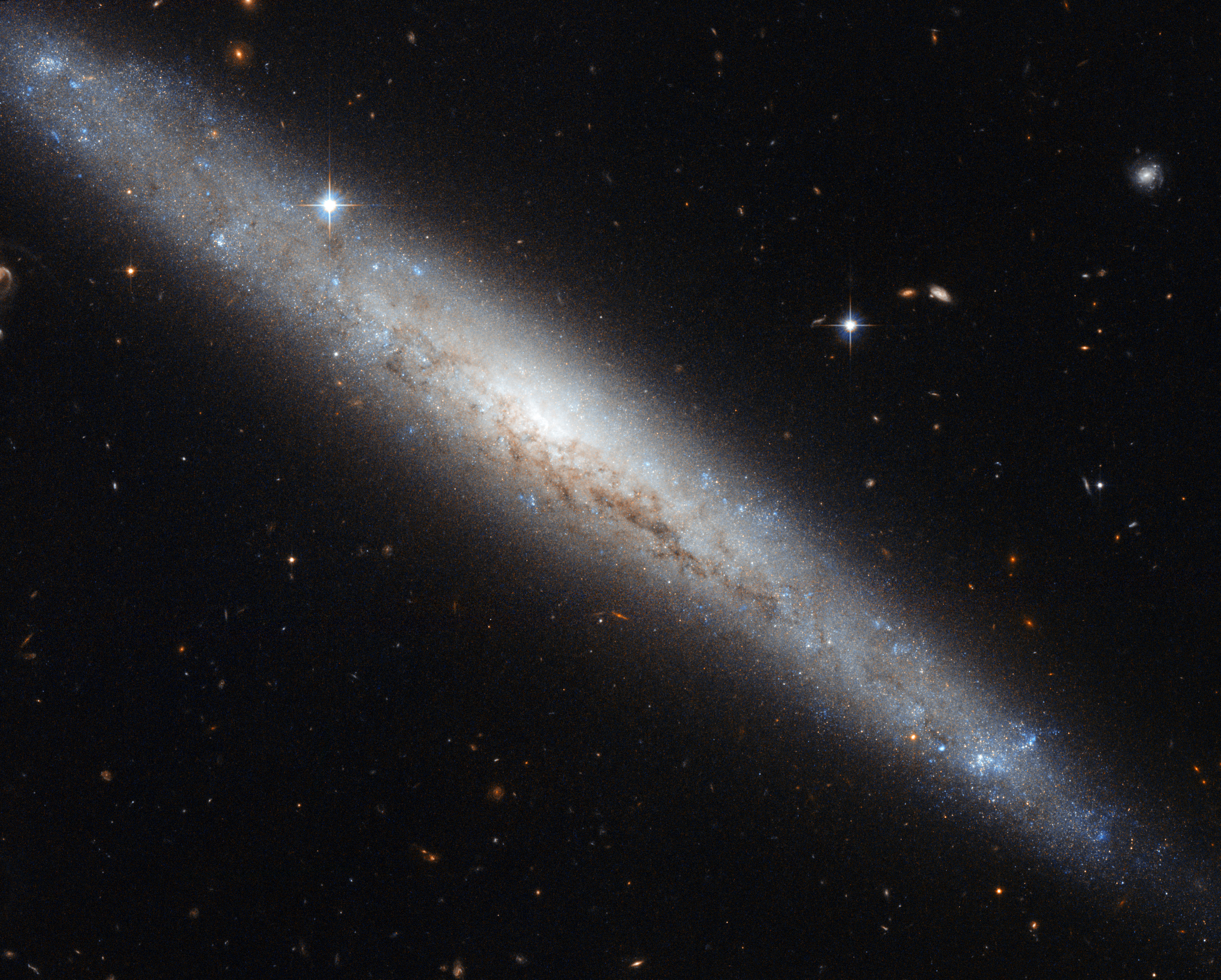
- Picture of NGC 4183 created from visible and infrared images taken with the Wide Field Channel of the Advanced Camera for Surveys.

Observation data (J2000 epoch)
- Constellation: Canes Venatici
- Right ascension: 12^{h} 13^{m} 16.860^{s}
- Declination: +43° 41′ 53.77″
- Redshift: 0.003105
- Heliocentric radial velocity: 929 km/s
- Distance: 55 million light years
- Group or cluster: Ursa Major Cluster

Characteristics
- Type: Sc
- Size: 80,000 ly (diameter)
- Apparent size (V): 6.39 x 0.39

Other designations
- MCG+07-25-051, UZC J121317.0+434153, [CHM2007] LDC 867 J121316.86+4341537, FGC 1386, 2MFGC 9620, Z 215-53, LEDA 38988, RFGC 2222, Z 1210.7+4358, 2MASX J12131686+4341537, UGC 7222, [CHM2007] HDC 706 J121316.86+4341537

NGC 4183 is a spiral galaxy with a faint core and an open spiral structure located about 55 million light-years from the Sun. Spanning about eighty thousand light-years, it appears in the constellation of Canes Venatici. NGC 4183 was observed for the first time by British astronomer William Herschel on 14 January 1788.

NGC 4183 is a member of the NGC 4111 Group, which is part of the Ursa Major Cloud and is the second largest group in the cloud after the NGC 3992 Group.

One supernova has been observed in NGC 4183: SN 1968U (type unknown, mag. 14.5) was discovered by Justus R. Dunlap on 29 October 1968.
