= NGC 3938 =

Galaxy in the constellation Ursa Major

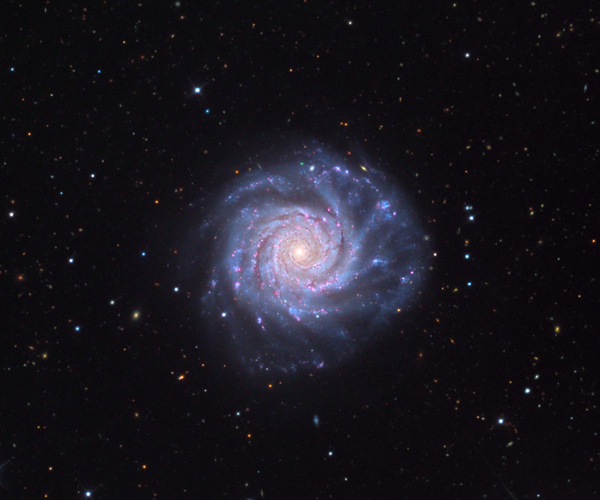
- NGC 3938 imaged by Mount Lemmon SkyCenter of the University of Arizona

Observation data (J2000 epoch)
- Constellation: Ursa Major
- Right ascension: 11^{h} 52^{m} 49.4319^{s}
- Declination: +44° 07′ 14.840″
- Redshift: 0.002695
- Heliocentric radial velocity: 808±2 km/s
- Distance: 41.40 ± 9.00 Mly (12.694 ± 2.760 Mpc)
- Apparent magnitude (V): 10.9

Characteristics
- Type: SA(s)c
- Size: ~76,400 ly (23.42 kpc) (estimated)
- Apparent size (V): 5.4′ × 4.9′

Other designations
- IRAS 11502+4423, UGC 6856, MCG +07-25-001, PGC 37229, CGCG 214-034

NGC 3938 is an unbarred spiral galaxy in the constellation Ursa Major. It was discovered by German-British astronomer William Herschel on 6 February 1788. It is one of the brightest spiral galaxies in the Ursa Major South galaxy group and is roughly 76,000 light years in diameter. It is approximately 41.4 million light years away from Earth. NGC 3938 is classified as type Sc under the Hubble sequence, a loosely wound spiral galaxy with a smaller and dimmer bulge. The spiral arms of the galaxy contain many areas of ionized atomic hydrogen gas, more so towards the center.

NGC 3938 is a member of the NGC 4111 Group, which is part of the Ursa Major Cloud and is the second largest group in the cloud after the NGC 3992 Group.

== Supernovae and Luminous Red Nova ==
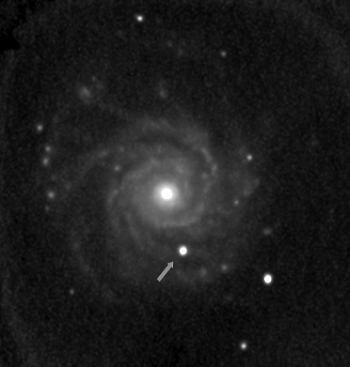
NGC 3938 with SN 2005ay

Five supernovae have been identified within NGC 3938:

- SN 1961U (Type II, mag. 13.7) was discovered by Paul Wild on 28 December 1961. (Note: Some sources incorrectly list the discovery date as 2 January 1962.)
- SN 1964L (Type Ic, mag. 13.3) was discovered by Paul Wild on 11 December 1964.
- SN 2005ay (Type II, mag. 15.6) was discovered by Doug Rich on 27 March 2005.
- SN 2017ein (Type Ic, mag. 17.6) was discovered by Ron Arbour on 25 May 2017 and peaked at magnitude 14.9. Images taken before the explosion point to a progenitor mass between ~47-48M_{☉}, if it was in a single star system, and ~60-80M_{☉}, if it was in a binary star system.
- SN 2022xlp (Type Ia, mag. 17) was discovered by Kōichi Itagaki on 13 October 2022.

One luminous red nova has been observed in NGC 3938:

- AT 2022ckk (type LRN, mag. 19.6766) was discovered by the Automatic Learning for the Rapid Classification of Events (ALeRCE) on 13 February 2022.

== Gallery ==
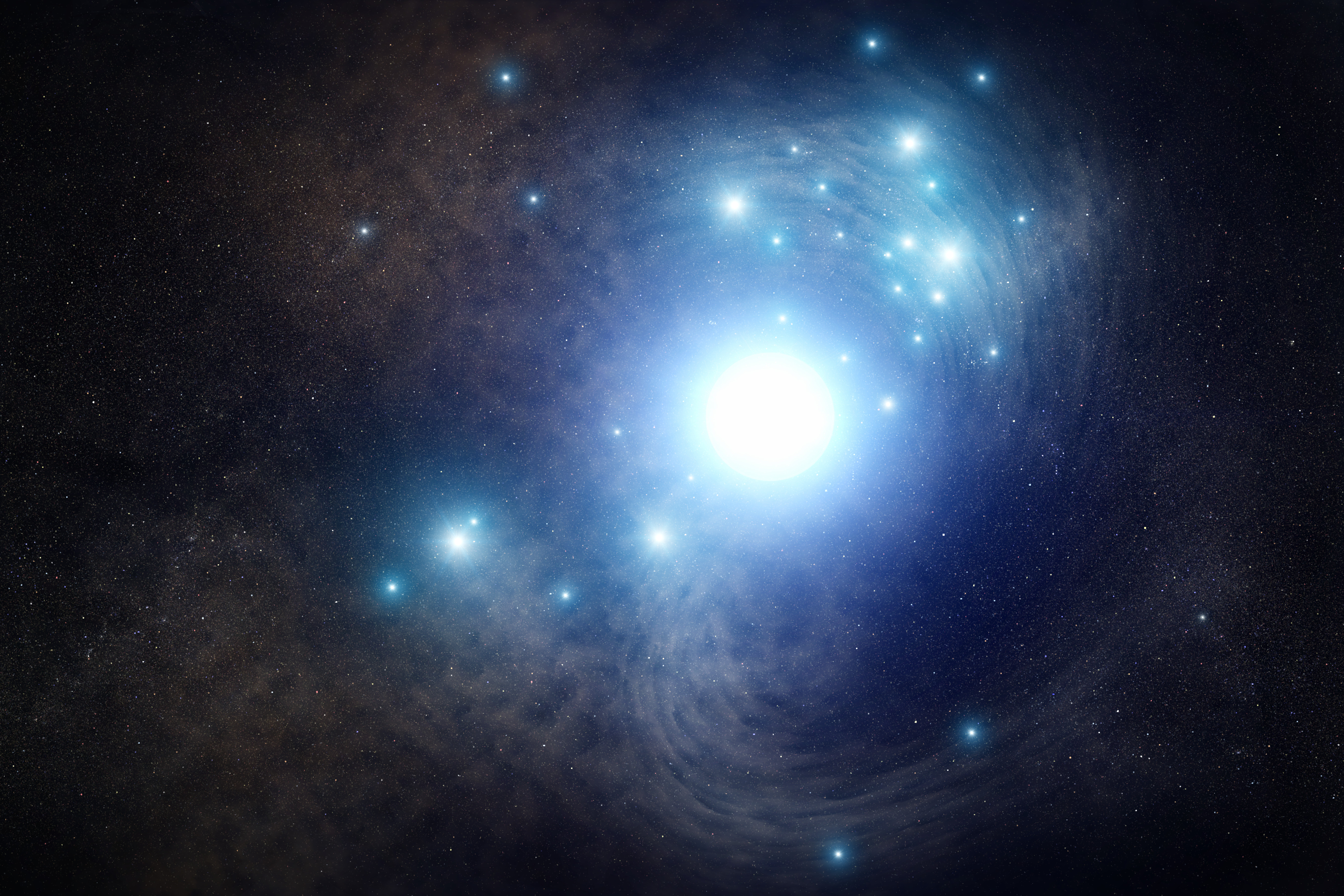
Artist's impression of progenitor star to a type Ic supernova SN 2017ein in NGC 3938.

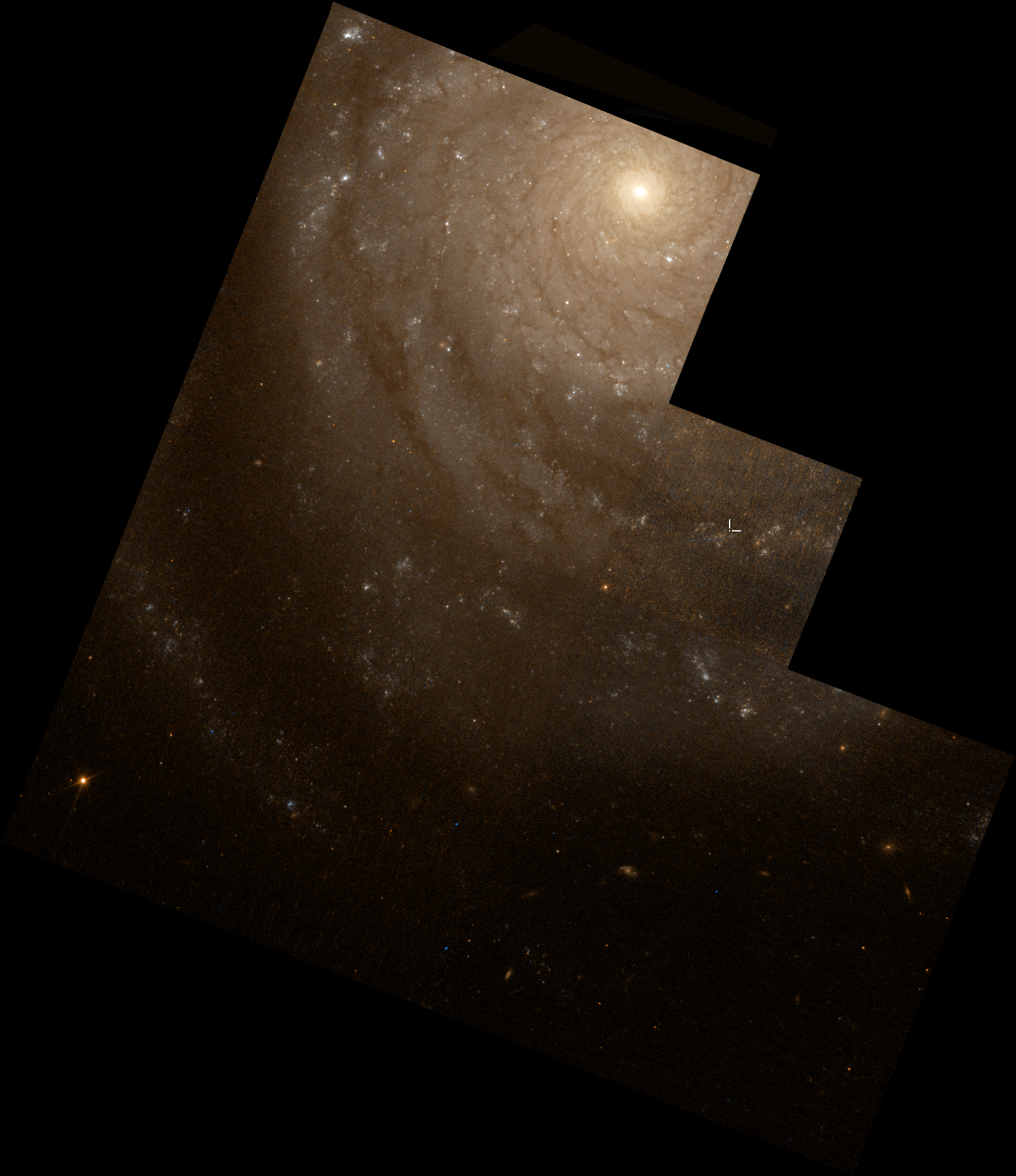
Spiral galaxy NGC 3938, by HST. Location of SN 2005ay remnant is marked.

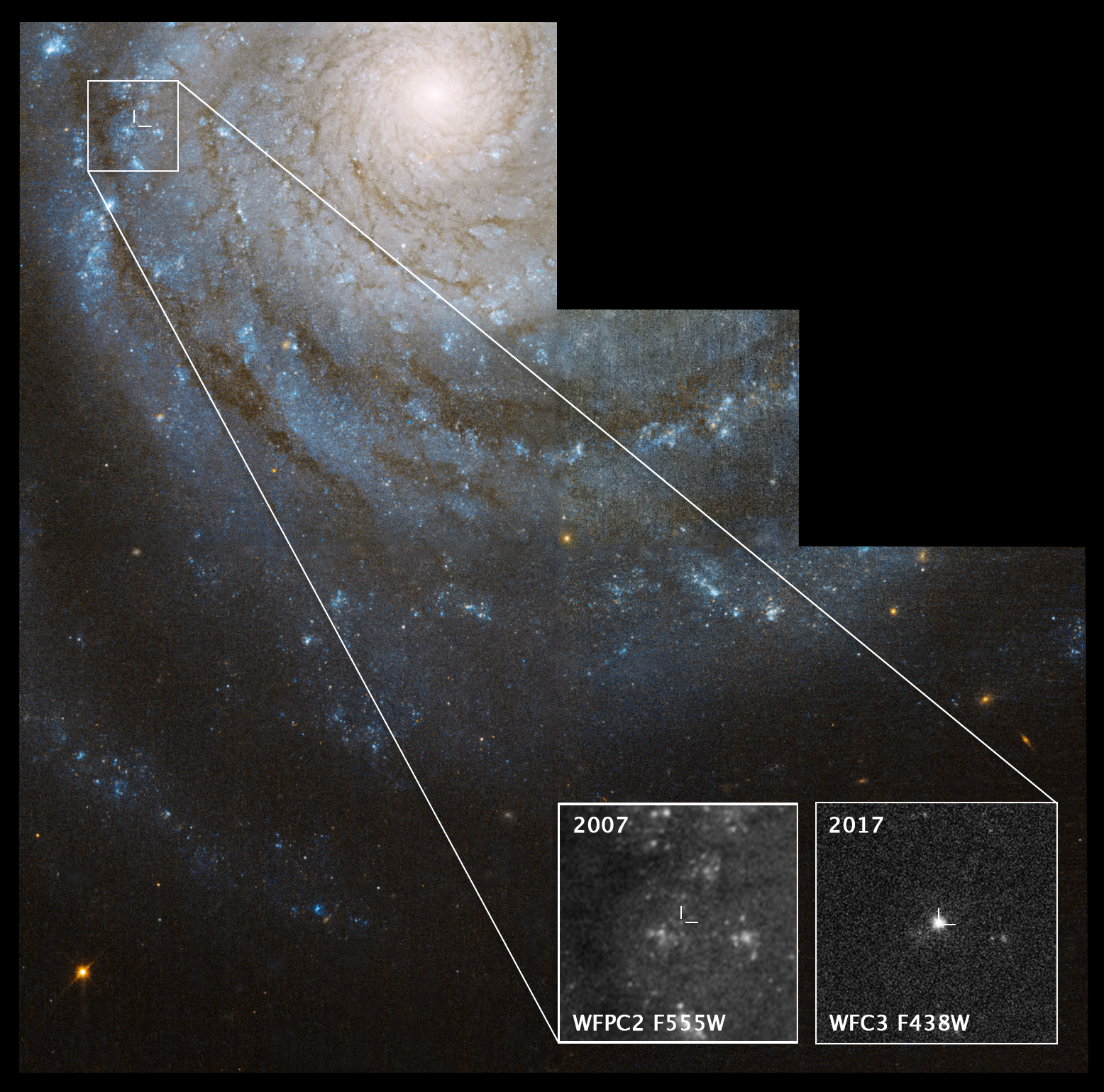
The location of SN 2017ein, by HST.

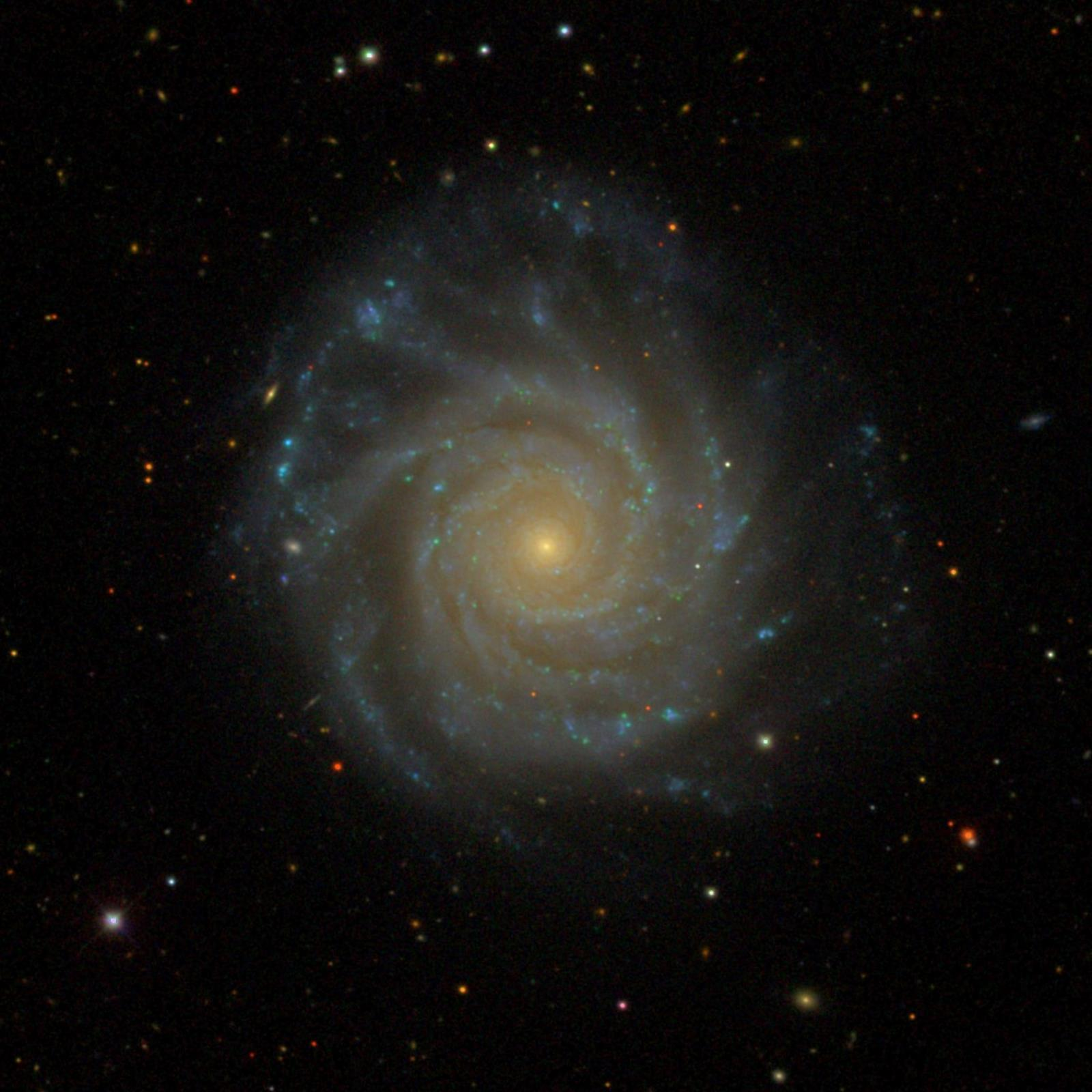
NGC 3938 by the Sloan Digital Sky Survey

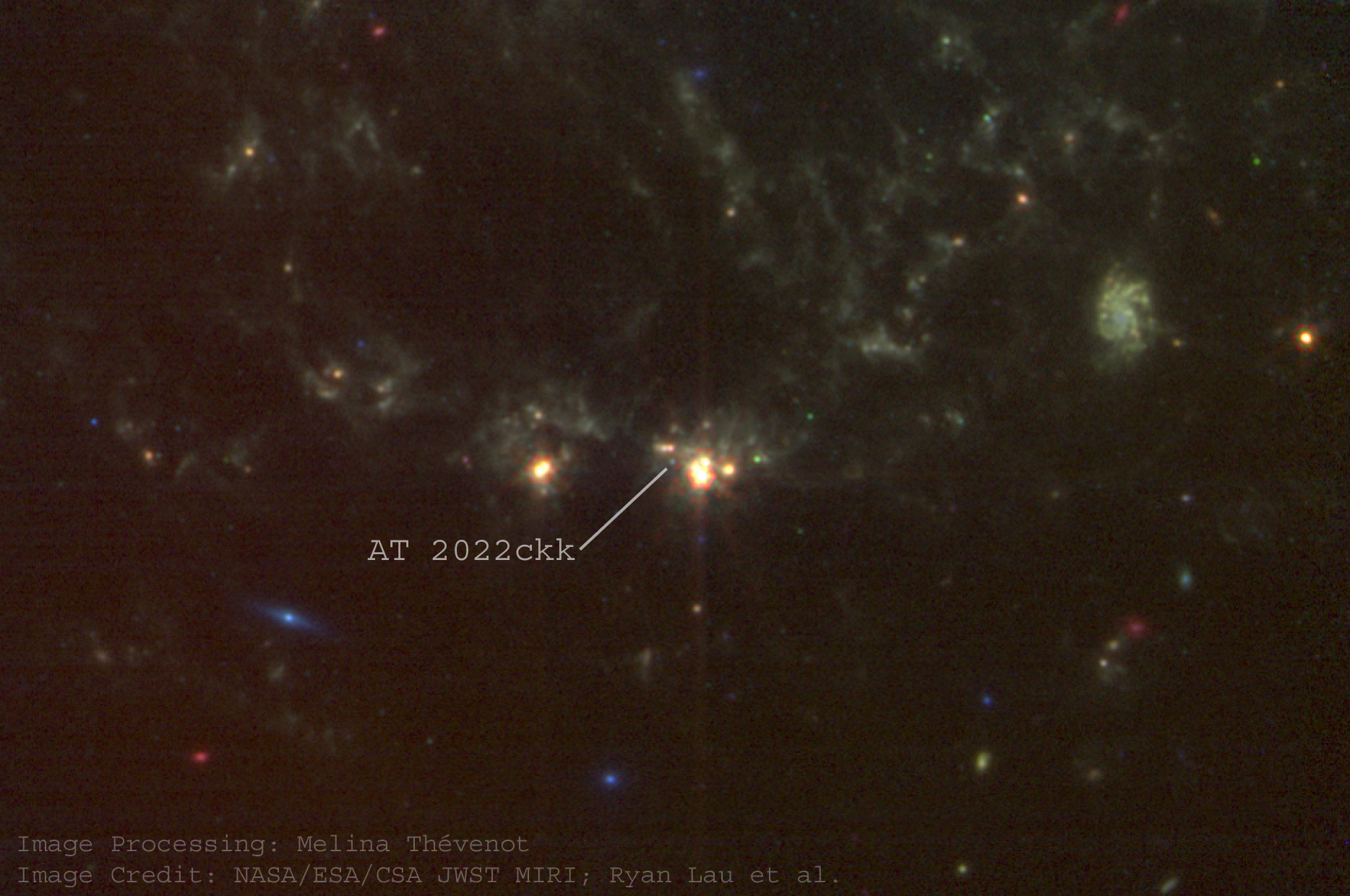
The luminous red nova AT 2022ckk with James Webb Space Telescope MIRI

== See also ==
- List of NGC objects (3001–4000)
