= NGC 4111 =

Galaxy in constellation Canes Venatici

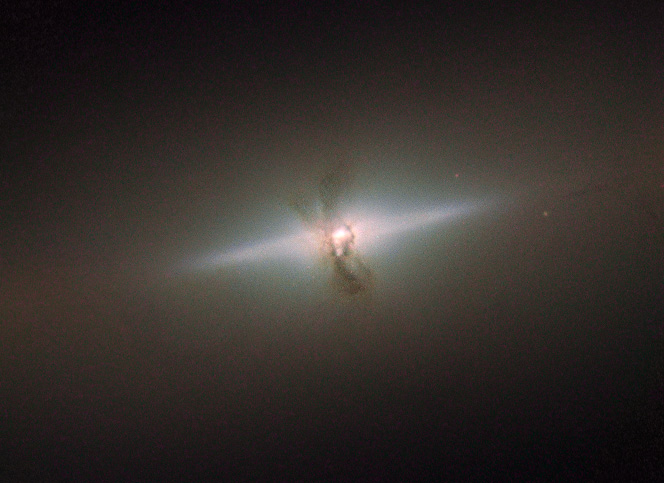
- NGC 4111 by Hubble Space Telescope

Observation data (J2000 epoch)
- Constellation: Canes Venatici
- Right ascension: 12^{h} 07^{m} 03.1^{s}
- Declination: 43° 03′ 57″
- Redshift: 792±5 km/s
- Distance: 43 ± 13 Mly (13.2 ± 4.0 Mpc)
- Apparent magnitude (V): 10.8

Characteristics
- Type: SA(r)0+
- Apparent size (V): 4.6′ × 1.0′

Other designations
- UGC 7103, MCG +07-25-026, PGC 38440

NGC 4111 is a lenticular galaxy in the constellation of Canes Venatici. It is located at a distance of circa 50 million light-years from Earth, which, given its apparent dimensions, means that NGC 4111 is about 55,000 light-years across. It was discovered by William Herschel in 1788. NGC 4111 possesses both thin and thick discs.

== Characteristics ==
The galaxy is characterised by a series of dusty filaments running through its centre. They are associated with a ring of material encircling the galaxy's core, which is not aligned with the galaxy's main disc, suggesting that this polar ring of gas and dust is actually the remains of a smaller galaxy. The polar ring has a diameter of 450 pc and in it is embedded one with a diameter of 220 pc visible in H_{2}1-0 imaging. The estimated cold molecular gas mass within the polar ring is estimated to be 10^{8} M_{☉}. The ring can provide enough material for an active galactic nucleus and for circumnuclear star formation. The galaxy also possesses an X-shaped, (peanut shell)-shaped bulge, thought to arise from an unstable stellar bar. The stellar population within the disk is quite young (2 ±0.3 billion years mean age) and its metallicity is subsolar.

The nucleus of the galaxy features a low-ionization nuclear emission-line region (LINER), which is emitting X-rays. The nucleus is the only source that was identified in observations by Chandra X-ray Observatory and there was also diffuse emission. The central sources accounts for approximately 77% of the hard X-rays emission of the galaxy. Its central source has also been detected in radiowaves and is believed to be a low luminosity active galactic nucleus.

== Nearby galaxies ==
NGC 4111 is the foremost galaxy in NGC 4111 galaxy group, one of the subgroups of Ursa Major Cluster. The NGC 4111 Group is the second most massive subgroup, after the M109 Group. According with Makarov and Karachentsev, members of the NGC 4111 Group are the galaxies UGC 6818, NGC 3938, NGC 4013, IC 749, IC 750, NGC 4051, UGC 7089, UGC 7094, NGC 4117, NGC 4138 and NGC 4183.

NGC 4111 appears disturbed in HI imaging, with HI extending 28 arcminutes south of the central position of NGC 4111, which corresponds in 120 kpc if the distance is 15 Mpc, and connects NGC 4111 with the nearby galaxies NGC 4117 and NGC 4118, which lie 7 arcminutes to east-northeast.
