= NGC 846 =

Galaxy in the constellation Andromeda

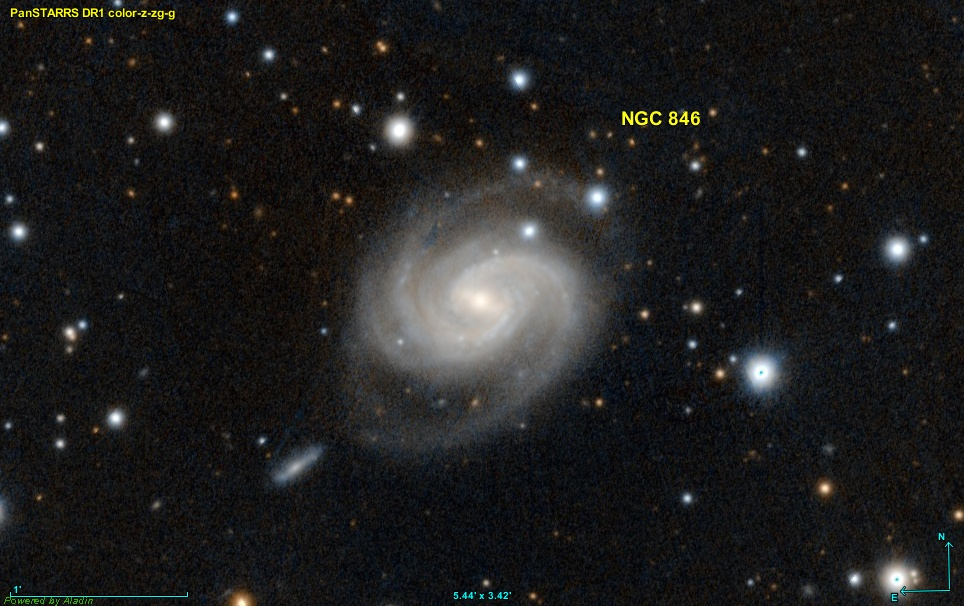
- A PanSTARRS (PanS) image of NGC 846

Observation data (J2000 epoch)
- Constellation: Andromeda
- Right ascension: 02^{h} 12^{m} 12.60^{s}
- Declination: +44° 34′ 05.0″
- Redshift: 0.017065 ± 2.60e-5
- Distance: 235 Mly (72.26 Mpc)
- Apparent magnitude (V): 12.3

Characteristics
- Type: SB(rs)ab
- Size: 162,000 ly
- Apparent size (V): 1.95′ × 1.698′
- Notable features: N/A

Other designations
- IRAS 02090+4420, NGC 847, UGC 1688, MCG +07-05-024, PGC 8430, CGCG 538-032

NGC 846 (also known as NGC 847) is a barred spiral galaxy located around 235 million light-years away in the constellation Andromeda. NGC 846 was discovered on November 22, 1876 by the French astronomer Édouard Stephan, and it has a diameter of around 162,000 light-years. NGC 846 is not known to have much star-formation, and it is not known to have an active galactic nucleus.

== Supernovae ==
Two supernovae have been observed in NGC 846:

- SN 2003ja (Type II, mag. 17.1) was discovered by the Lick Observatory Supernova Search (LOSS) on 22 October 2003.
- SN 2009fu (Type Ia, mag. 15.7) was discovered by Kōichi Itagaki on 1 June 2009.

== LGG 46 Group ==
It is part of a galaxy group known as NGC 812 Group or LGG 46. It has at least 3 members, which are NGC 812, NGC 846 and UGC 1686.

== See also ==
- List of NGC objects (1–1000)
