= Multicolor Active Galactic Nuclei Monitoring =

Multicolor Active Galactic Nuclei Monitoring or MAGNUM was a project completed in 2008, that used a 2 meter (78.7 inch) telescope at Haleakala, Hawaii. The project started in 1995, with telescope observations starting in 2000 for the scientific study of active galactic nuclei. It was run by the University of Tokyo, the National Astronomical Observatory of Japan, and Australian National University. MAGNUM was one of the telescopes that observed a cosmic explosion billions of years away in 2005. The telescope was used for a long-term study of the size of the universe; for example it studied the Seyfert 1 galaxies NGC 5548, NGC 4051, NGC 3227, and NGC 7469 The telescope was located at the Haleakala Observatory and was installed in the north dome previously used by LURE.

This was an astronomy project that used an automated telescope to look for AGN at visible and near infrared wavelengths.
