= NGC 5949 =

Galaxy in the constellation Draco

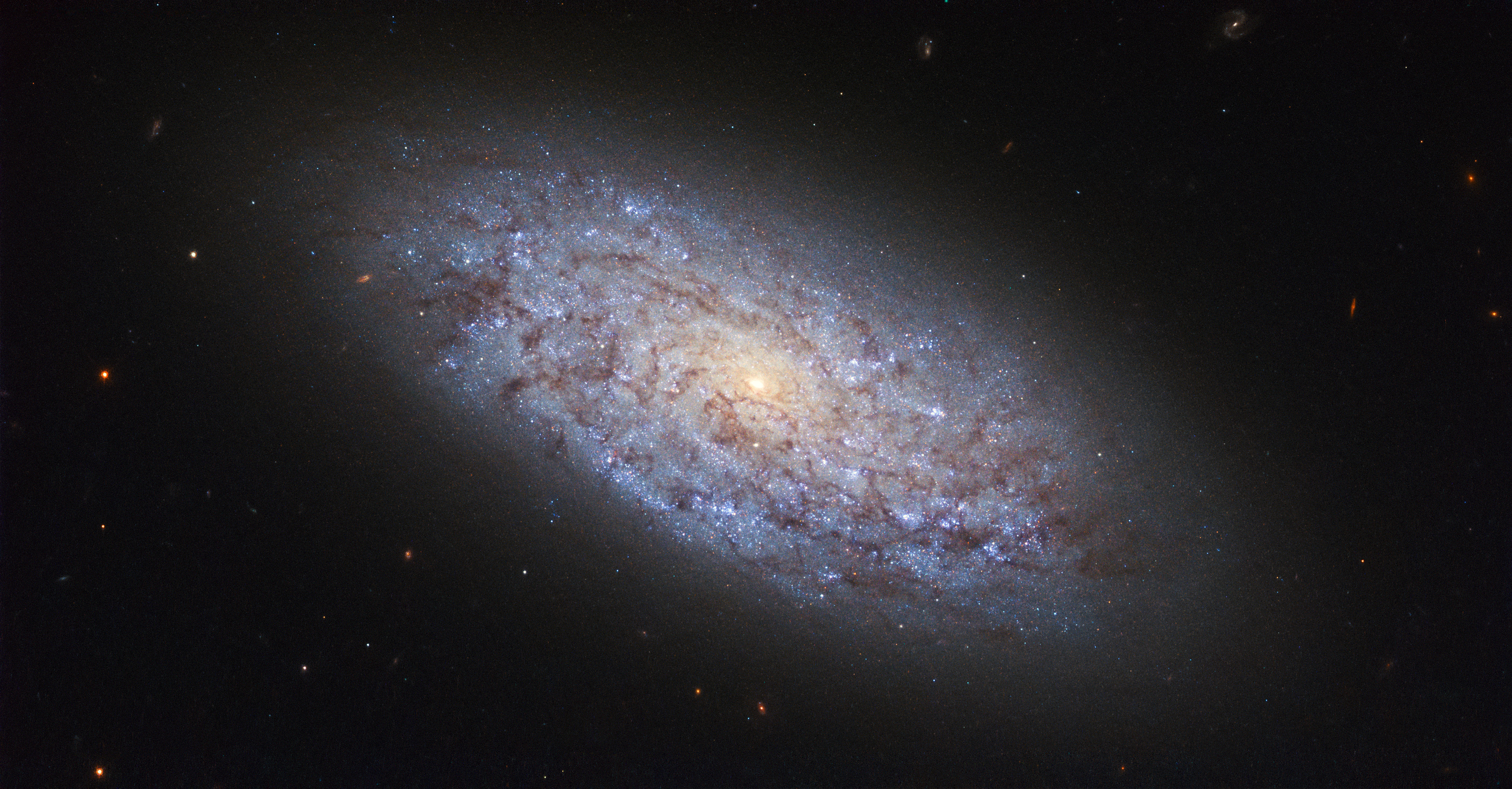
- A Hubble Space Telescope (HST) image of NGC 5949

Observation data (J2000 epoch)
- Constellation: Draco
- Right ascension: 15^{h} 28^{m} 0.70^{s}
- Declination: 64° 45′ 48.0″
- Redshift: 0.001414±0.000073
- Distance: 44 Mly (13.49 Mpc)
- Apparent magnitude (V): 12.1

Characteristics
- Type: SA(r)bc
- Size: 30,000 ly (diameter)
- Apparent size (V): 1.9 x .89
- Notable features: Bright hot blue stars make up most of the galaxy

Other designations
- LEDA 55165, SDSS J152800.67+644547.4, Z 319-16, IRAS F15273+6456, 2MASX J15280067+6445473, TC 847, Z 1527.4+6455, IRAS 15273+6456, MCG+11-19-008, UGC 9866, K73 682, PSCz Q15273+6456, UZC J152800.7+644547

NGC 5949 is a dwarf spiral galaxy located around 44 million light-years away in the constellation Draco. NGC 5949 was discovered in 1801 by William Herschel, and it is 30,000 light-years across. NGC 5949 is not known to have an active galactic nucleus, and it is not known for much star-formation.

== Characteristics ==
With a mass of about a hundredth that of the Milky Way, NGC 5949 is a relatively bulky example of a dwarf galaxy. Its classification as a dwarf is due to its relatively small number of constituent stars, but the galaxy’s loosely-bound spiral arms also place it in the category of barred spirals. This structure is just visible in the Hubble Space Telescope (HST) image, which shows the galaxy as a bright yet ill-defined pinwheel. Despite its small proportions, NGC 5949’s proximity has meant that its light can be picked up by fairly small telescopes, as discovered by William Herschel.

Astronomers have run into several cosmological quandaries when it comes to dwarf galaxies like NGC 5949. For example, the distribution of dark matter within dwarfs is quite puzzling (the “cuspy halo” problem), and our simulations of the Universe predict that there should be many more dwarf galaxies than we see around us (the “missing satellites” problem).
