= NGC 4013 =

Galaxy in the constellation Ursa Major

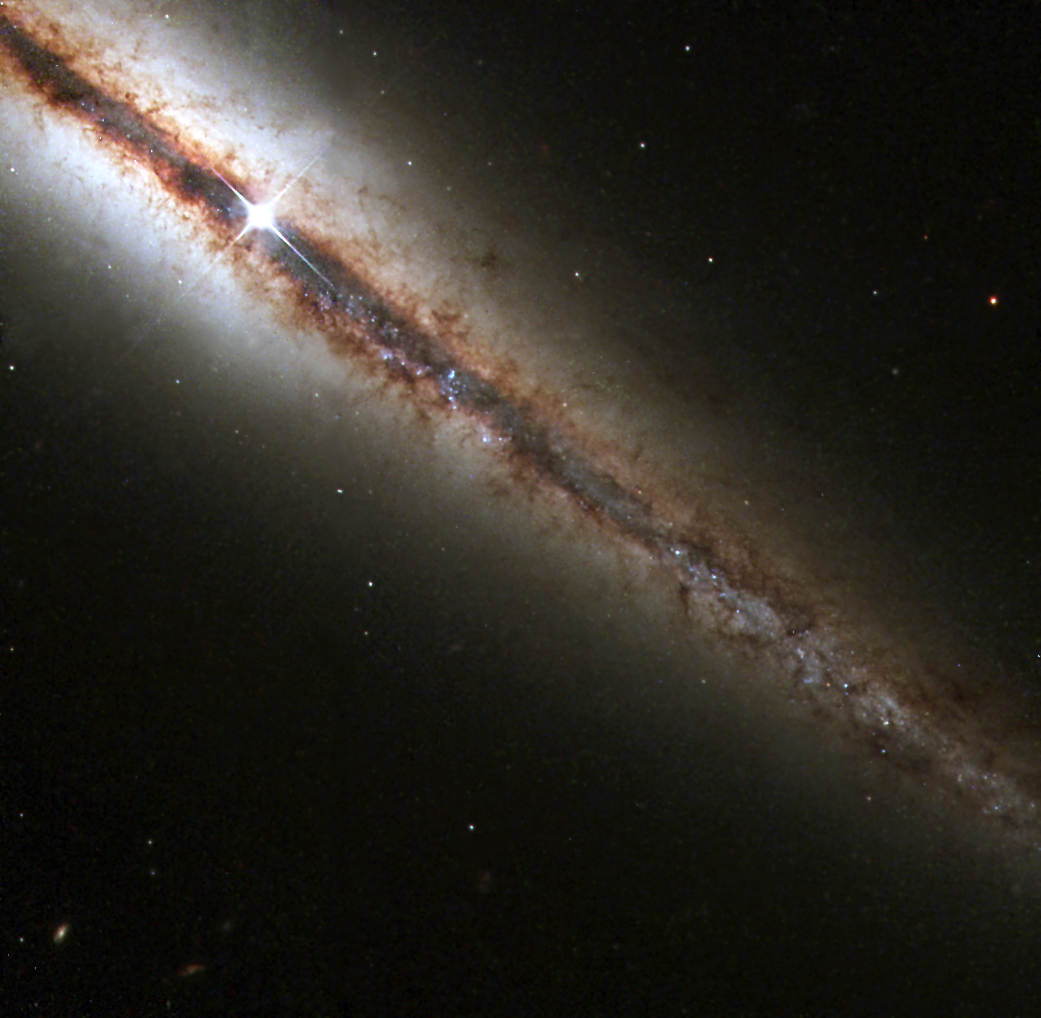
- HST closeup view of NGC 4013

Observation data (J2000 epoch)
- Constellation: Ursa Major
- Right ascension: 11^{h} 58^{m} 31.13^{s}
- Declination: +43° 56′ 50.1″
- Redshift: 831 ± 1 km/s
- Distance: 60.6 ± 8.1 Mly (18.6 ± 2.5 Mpc)
- Apparent magnitude (V): 12.1B

Characteristics
- Type: SBa
- Size: 30.33 kpc (98,900 ly) (diameter; 25.0 mag/arcsec^{2} B-band isophote)
- Apparent size (V): 5.2' x 1.0'

Other designations
- UGC 6963, PGC 37691 LEDA 37691 2MFGC 9412 IRAS 11559+4413 2MASX J11583141+4356492 MCG+07-25-009 UZC J115831.5+435651

NGC 4013 is an edge-on barred spiral galaxy about 55 million light-years away in the constellation Ursa Major. The disk of NGC 4013 shows a distinct "peanut"-shaped bulge in long exposure photographs that N-body computer simulations suggest is consistent with a stellar bar seen perpendicular to the line of sight.

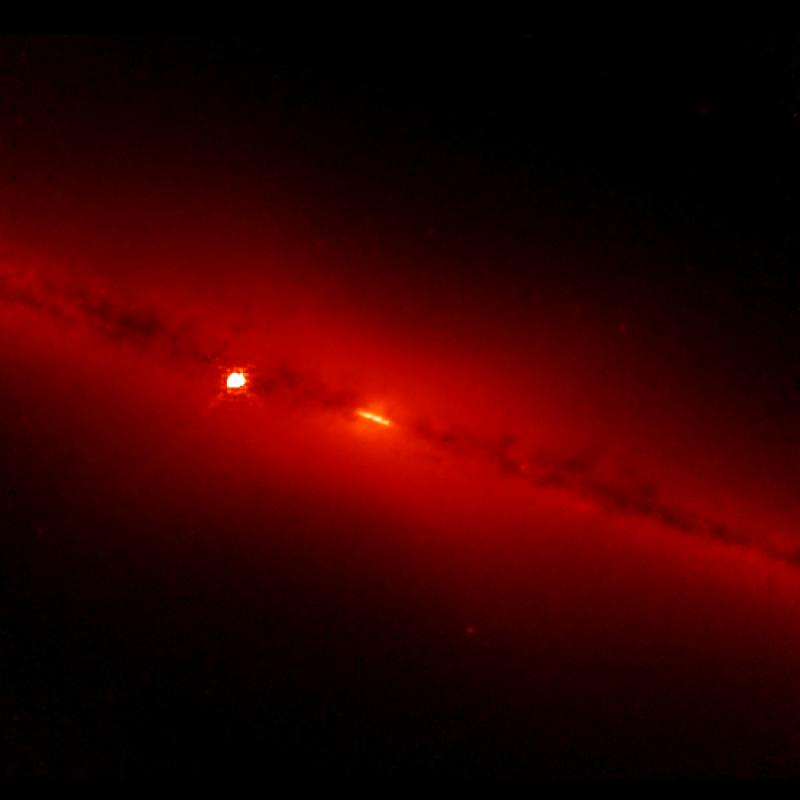
Infrared image of the galaxy showing a ring of heavy star formation

A recent deep color image of NGC 4013 revealed a looping tidal stream of stars extending over 80 thousand light-years from the Galactic Center. This structure is thought to be the remnants of a smaller galaxy that was torn apart by tidal forces as it collided with NGC 4013.

NGC 4013 is a member of the Ursa Major Cluster. It is a member of the NGC 4111 Group, which is part of the Ursa Major Cloud and is the second largest group in the cloud after the NGC 3992 Group.

== Supernova imposter ==
In January, 1991, M. Shaw reported an apparent supernova seen on an image taken December 30, 1989, at apparent magnitude 12, which was then given the designation SN 1989Z. However, later analysis suggested that this object was actually a foreground variable star, or an outburst from a cataclysmic variable star.

== See also ==
- Cigar Galaxy
