= NGC 4051 =

Galaxy in the constellation Ursa Major

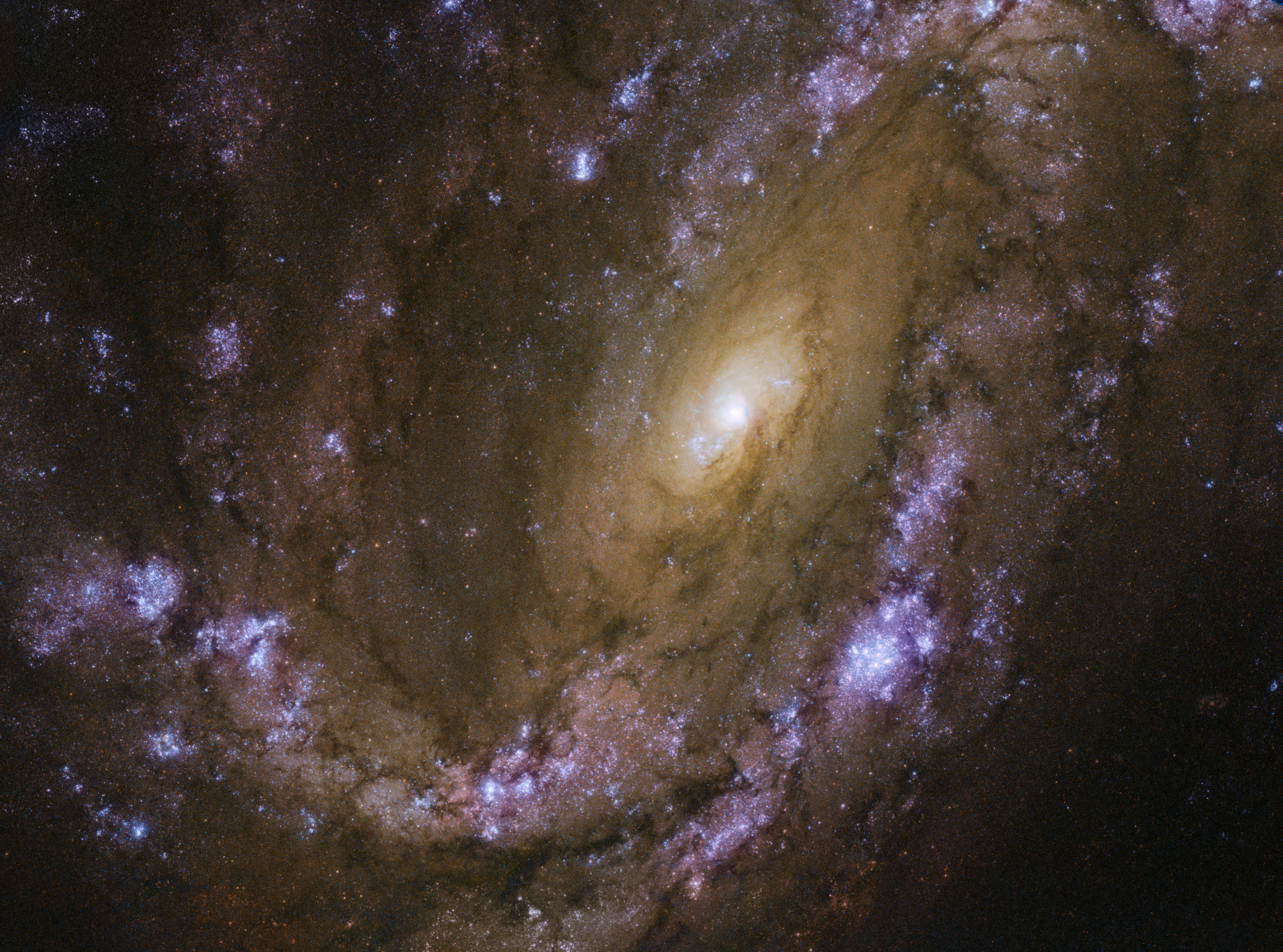
- The nucleus of NGC 4051 imaged by the Hubble Space Telescope

Observation data (J2000 epoch)
- Constellation: Ursa Major
- Right ascension: 12^{h} 03^{m} 09.686^{s}
- Declination: +44° 31′ 52.54″
- Redshift: 0.002336
- Heliocentric radial velocity: 700 km/s
- Distance: 54.14 ± 0.98 Mly (16.6 ± 0.3 Mpc)
- Group or cluster: Ursa Major Cluster
- Apparent magnitude (V): 12.92
- Apparent magnitude (B): 11.08

Characteristics
- Type: SAB(rs)bc
- Size: 78,800 ly (24,160 pc) (Note: POSS1 103a-O values used.)
- Apparent size (V): 6.00′ × 4.98′

Other designations
- IRAS 12005+4448, UGC 7030, PGC 38068, CGCG 243-038

NGC 4051 is an intermediate spiral galaxy in the constellation of Ursa Major. It was discovered on 6 February 1788 by William Herschel.

NGC 4051 contains a supermassive black hole with a mass of 1.73 million M_{☉}. This galaxy was studied by the Multicolor Active Galactic Nuclei Monitoring 2m telescope.

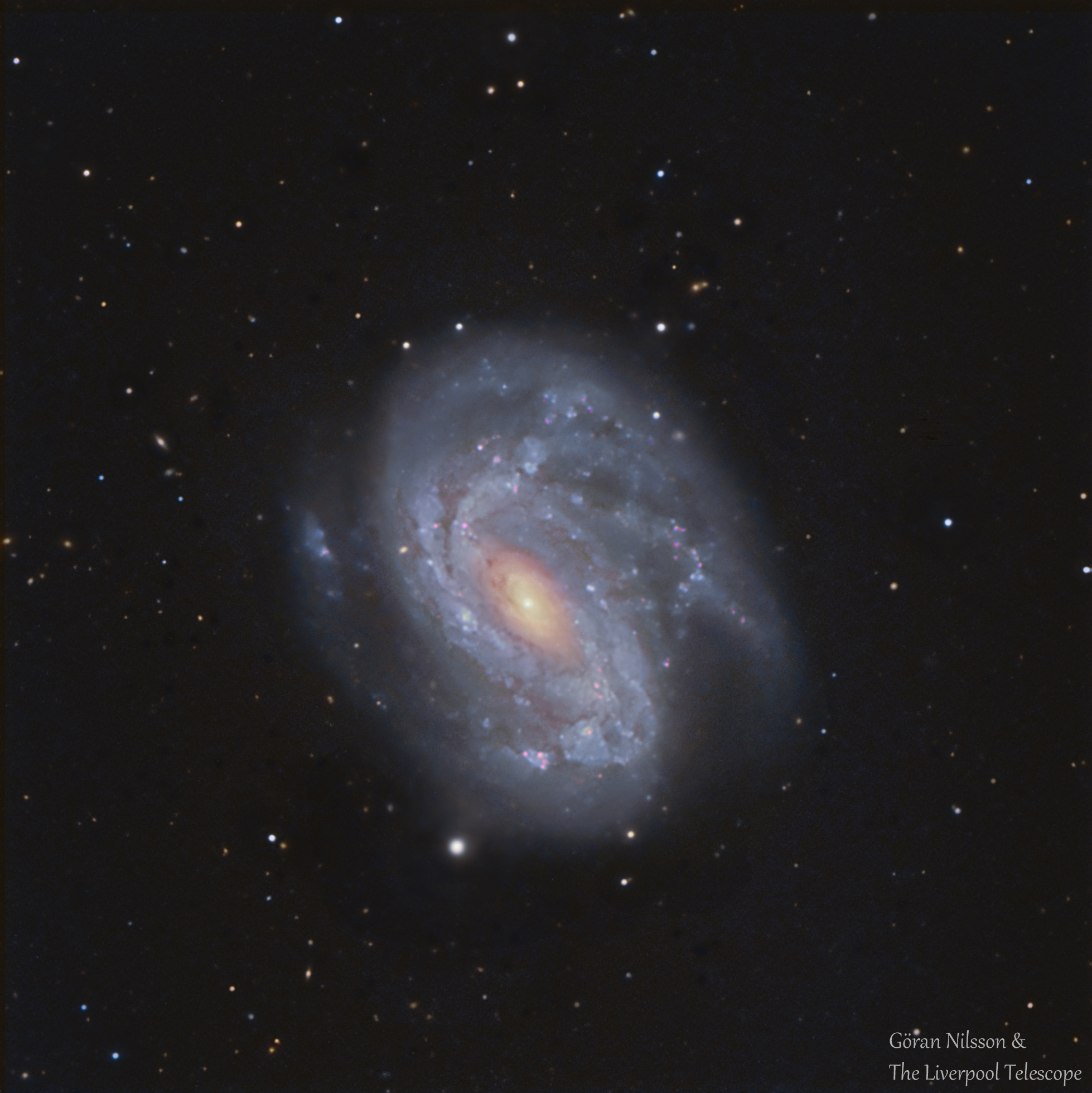
NGC 4051 imaged by the Liverpool Telescope

The galaxy is a Seyfert galaxy that emits bright X-rays. However, in early 1998 the X-ray emission ceased as observed by the Beppo-SAX satellite. X-ray emission had risen back to normal by August 1998.

NGC 4051 is a member of the Ursa Major Cluster. Its peculiar velocity is −490 ± 34 km/s, consistent with the rest of the cluster. It is a member of the NGC 4111 Group, which is part of the Ursa Major Cloud and is the second largest group in the cloud after the NGC 3992 Group.

== Supernovae ==
Three supernovae have been discovered in NGC 4051:

- SN 1983I (Type Ic, mag. 13.5) was discovered independently by J. Kielkopf et al, on 11 May 1983, and by Tsvetkov on 12 May 1983.
- SN 2003ie (Type II, mag. 15.2) was discovered by Ron Arbour on 19 September 2003.
- SN 2010br (Type Ib/c, mag. 17.7) was discovered by Vitali Nevski on 10 April 2010.
