= Doug Rich =

Doug Rich (born 1948, in Hartford, Connecticut) is an American amateur astronomer, supernova discoverer, and team leader for the Eagle Hill Supernova Search Project. He is also a former ZYGO optician and telescope maker and now lives in Hampden, Maine, USA. In 1999 he established Rich Observatory and has since discovered 26 extragalactic supernovae.

Rich has received attention for his work with discovering supernovae. He wrote an article in Astronomy Magazine on the topic and was later featured in Sky and Telescope magazine, which identified him as one of four leading amateurs in the field of discovering supernovae.

Rich has had three notable supernova discoveries. SN 2005ay, was a relatively nearby type II-P (plateau) supernova caught soon after explosion. Extensive observations of SN 2005ay in galaxy NGC 3938, with the GALEX Space Telescope and numerous land-based telescopes, helped astronomers confirm the theory that type II-P supernovae can be used as "standard candles" - a way to measure distances to distant galaxies. SN2010X was an uncommon merger of two white dwarf stars in galaxy NGC 1573A. This rare type of supernova which has spectral characteristics similar to a type Ia, is dubbed a .Ia (point one a) because it is one-tenth as luminous as a normal type Ia supernova and also fades in about one-tenth the time. Another unique discovery, SN2010al, was a rare explosion of a Wolf-Rayet Star in galaxy UGC 4286. This find, also discovered at an early stage, was influential in establishing a new supernova sub-classification - the type Ibn.
