= Dwarf spiral galaxy =

Dwarf counterparts of spiral galaxies

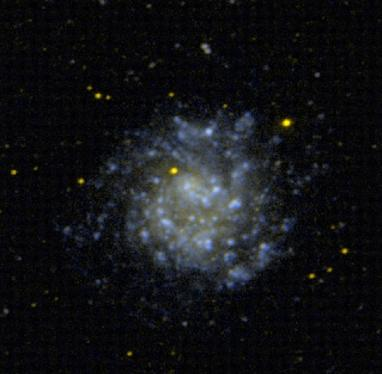
NGC 5474, an example of a dwarf spiral galaxy

A dwarf spiral galaxy is the dwarf version of a spiral galaxy. Dwarf galaxies are characterized as having low luminosities, small diameters (less than 5 kpc), low surface brightnesses, and low hydrogen masses. The galaxies may be considered a subclass of low-surface-brightness galaxies.

Dwarf spiral galaxies, particularly the dwarf counterparts of Sa–Sc type spiral galaxies, are quite rare. In contrast, dwarf elliptical galaxies, dwarf irregular galaxies, and the dwarf versions of Magellanic type galaxies (which may be considered transitory between spiral and irregular in terms of morphology) are very common.

It is suggested that dwarf spiral galaxies can transform into dwarf elliptical galaxies, especially in dense cluster environments.

== Examples ==
- NGC 5474
- NGC 3928
- NGC 625
- NGC 1051
- NGC 1311
- NGC 5949

== Location ==
Most identified dwarf spiral galaxies are located outside clusters. Strong gravitational interactions between galaxies and interactions between galaxies and intracluster gas are expected to destroy the disks of most dwarf spiral galaxies. Nonetheless, dwarf galaxies with spiral-like structure have been identified within the Virgo Cluster and Coma Cluster.
