= Ursa Major Cluster =

Galaxy cluster of the Virgo Supercluster

The Ursa Major Cluster (Ursa Major I Cluster, UMa I ClG) is a spiral-rich galaxy cluster part of the Virgo Supercluster.

Some of its members are: NGC 3631, NGC 3953, M109 on North (M109 Group) and NGC 3726, NGC 3938, NGC 4051 on South. R. Brent Tully identified its members to be M108, M109, NGC 4157, NGC 3953, 4100, 3877, 4217, 4183, 4013, 3917, 3893, 3972, 4010, 4085, 3782, UGC 6917, 6983, 6667, 7089, 6399 and 6818.

The Ursa Major cluster is located at a distance of 18.6 megaparsecs (60 million light-years) and contains about 30% of the light emitted but only 5% of the mass of the nearby Virgo Cluster.

The Ursa Major Cluster is part of the Ursa Major Cloud, a dense filament of about approximately 580 galaxies, that was identified and described in 1987 by astronomer Brent Tully with colleague Richard Fisher in his book The Nearby Galaxies Atlas, as Cloud 12, and contains 20 other groups besides the Ursa Major Cluster. The Ursa Major Cloud (Which also forms a connection with the Canes Venatici-Camelopardalis Cloud) is part of a larger filament, emanating from the Centaurus Cluster through the Virgo Cluster and continues through the Ursa Major Cluster all the way to the Perseus–Pisces Supercluster, that is known as the Virgo Strand or Centaurus–Virgo–PP Filament.

The Ursa Major cluster consists of 7 separate subgroups, The NGC 3769 Group, NGC 3877 Group, NGC 3992 Group, NGC 4111 Group, NGC 4157 Group, NGC 4217 Group, and NGC 4346 Group.
