= NGC 4010 =

Galaxy in Ursa Major constellation

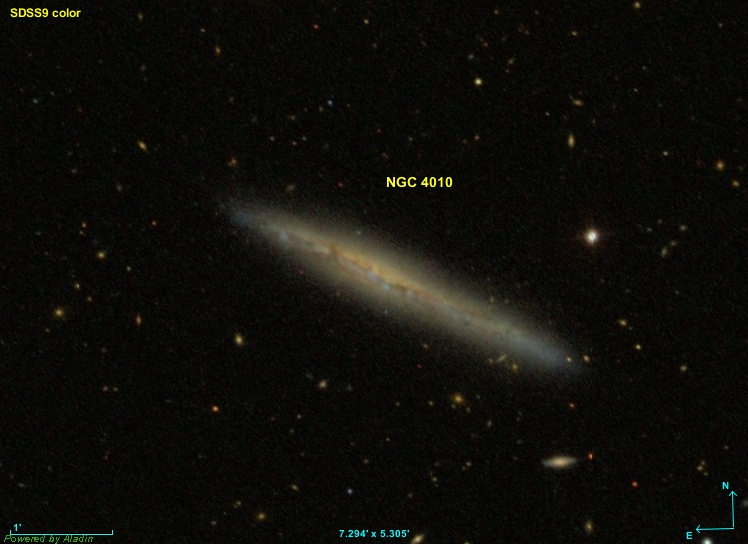
- Image of NGC 4010

Observation data (J2000 epoch)
- Constellation: Ursa Major
- Right ascension: 11^{h} 58^{m} 29.0798^{s}
- Declination: +27° 31′ 43.366″
- Redshift: 0.011478 ± 0.000000334
- Heliocentric radial velocity: 3441 ± 1 km/s
- Galactocentric velocity: 3424 ± 1km/s
- Distance: 179.9 ± 12.6 Mly (55.16 ± 3.87 Mpc)
- Apparent magnitude (V): 13.1

Characteristics
- Size: ~303,000 ly (92.90 kpc) (estimated)

Other designations
- 2MASS J11583799+4715407, UGC 6954, LEDA 37697

NGC 4010 (also known as UGC 6954 ) is a barred spiral galaxy in the constellation Ursa Major. It was first discovered On 26 April 1830, by John Herschel.

== M109 Group ==
NGC 4010 is a member of the M109 Group which is part of the Virgo Supercluster.The galaxy group contain a lot of galaxy, example are Messier 109, NGC 3893, NGC 3953.

== See also ==
- List of NGC objects (4001-5000)
- List of NGC objects
