= NGC 3928 =

Galaxy in the constellation Ursa Major

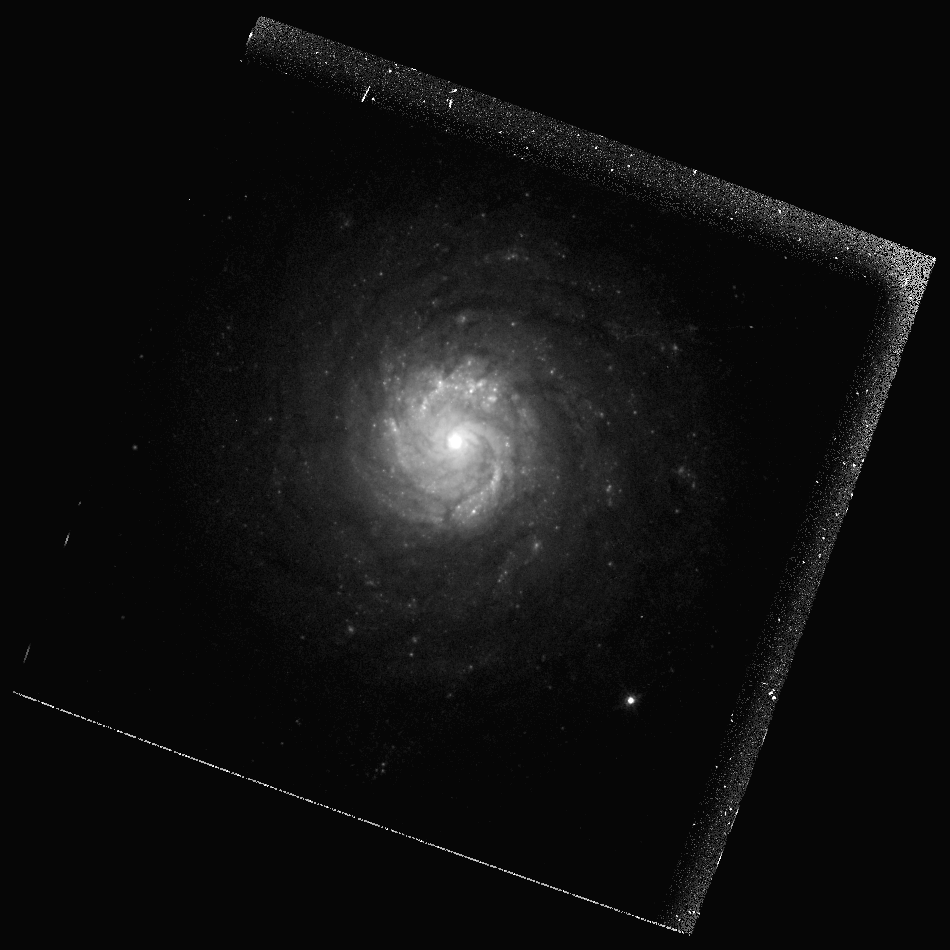
- Hubble Space Telescope image of NGC 3928

Observation data (J2000 epoch)
- Constellation: Ursa Major
- Right ascension: 11^{h} 51^{m} 47^{s}
- Declination: +48° 40′ 59″
- Redshift: 0.000764
- Heliocentric radial velocity: 988 ± 4 km/s
- Apparent magnitude (B): 13.1

Characteristics
- Type: SA(s)b
- Size: ~18,000 ly (5.6 kpc)

Other designations
- NGC 3928, UGC 6834, MCG +08-22-019, Mrk 190, PGC 37136

NGC 3928, also known as the Miniature Spiral, is a lenticular galaxy, sometimes classified as a dwarf spiral galaxy, in the constellation Ursa Major. It was discovered by William Herschel on March 9, 1788.

== Gallery ==
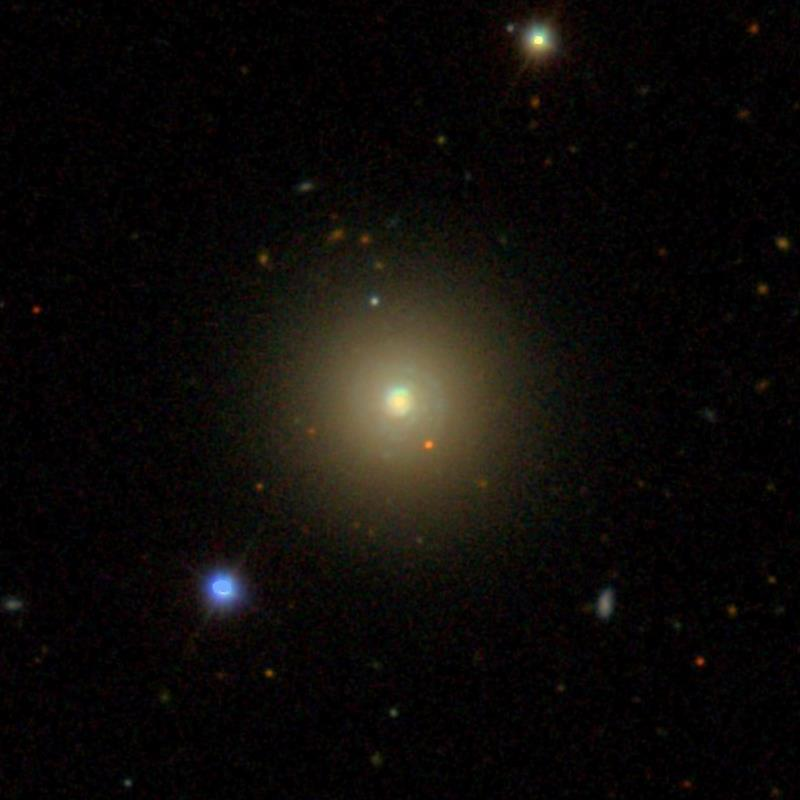
NGC 3928 (SDSS DR14)
