= NGC 3949 =

Galaxy in the constellation Ursa Major

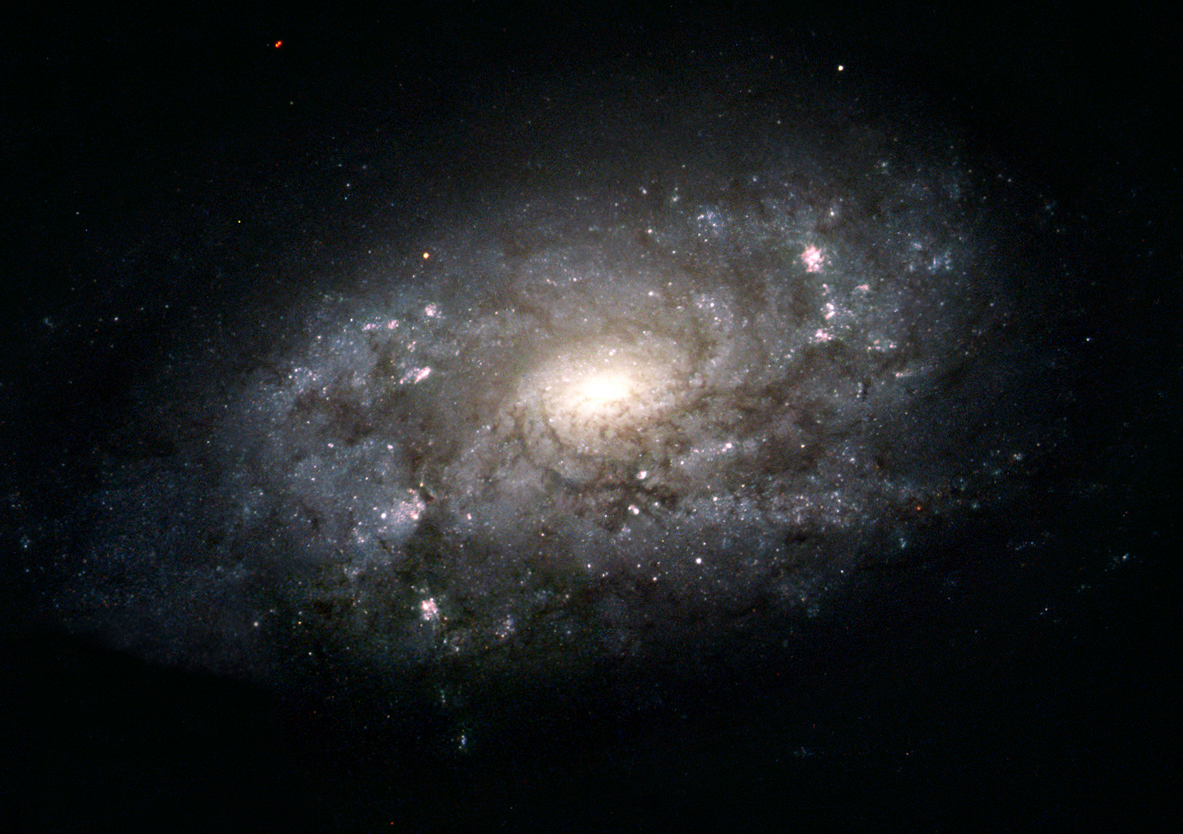
- NGC 3949 imaged by the Hubble Space Telescope

Observation data (J2000 epoch)
- Constellation: Ursa Major
- Right ascension: 11^{h} 53^{m} 41.7948^{s}
- Declination: +47° 51′ 31.387″
- Redshift: 800±1 km/s
- Distance: 48.6 ± 3.5 Mly (14.89 ± 1.06 Mpc)
- Apparent magnitude (V): 10.6

Characteristics
- Type: SA(s)bc
- Size: ~47,800 ly (14.66 kpc) (estimated)
- Apparent size (V): 2.9′ × 1.7′

Other designations
- HOLM 301A, IRAS 11510+4808, UGC 6869, MCG +08-22-029, PGC 37290, CGCG 243-025

NGC 3949 is an unbarred spiral galaxy in the constellation Ursa Major, approximately 50 million light-years away from the Earth. It was discovered by German-British astronomer William Herschel on 5 February 1788.

NGC 3949 is a member of the M109 Group, a group of galaxies located in the constellation Ursa Major that may contain over 50 galaxies. The brightest galaxy in the group is the spiral galaxy M109.

One supernova has been observed in NGC 3949: SN 2000db (Type II, mag. 14.3) was discovered by Masakatsu Aoki on 6 August 2000.

== See also ==
- List of NGC objects (3001–4000)
