= UGC 8837 =

Dwarf galaxy located in Ursa Major

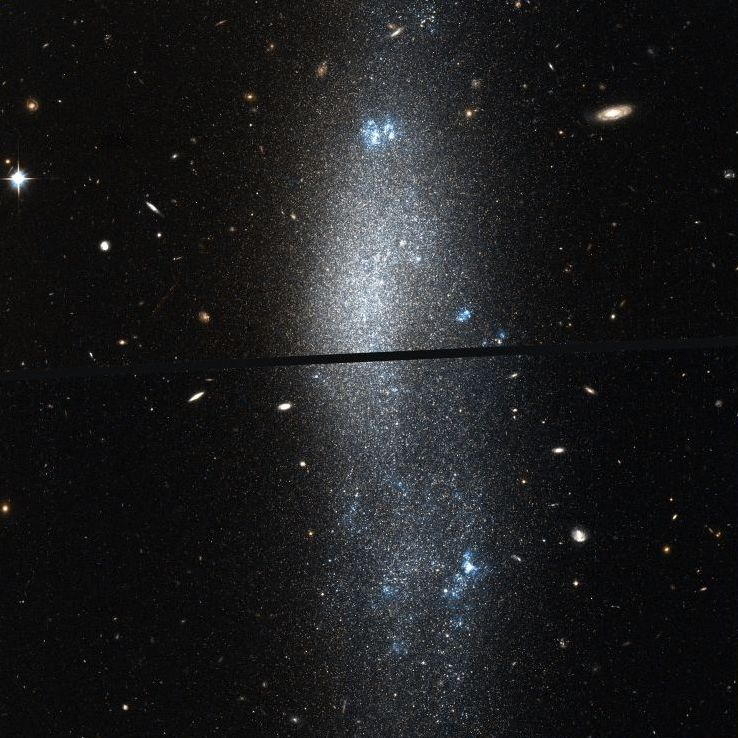
- Dwarf galaxy UGC 8837 taken by the Hubble Space Telescope.

Observation data (J2000 epoch)
- Constellation: Ursa Major
- Right ascension: 13^{h} 54^{m} 45.602^{s}
- Declination: +53° 54′ 20.06″
- Redshift: 0.000467
- Heliocentric radial velocity: 140 km/s
- Distance: 24 Mly
- Apparent magnitude (V): 13.34
- Apparent magnitude (B): 14.2

Characteristics
- Type: IB(s)m
- Apparent size (V): 2.1' x 0.6'

Other designations
- Holmberg IV, LEDA 49448, UZC J135445.5+535416, [MI94] Sm 93, Anon 1352+54, MCG+09-23-017, Z 272-13, DDO 185, SDSS J135445.60+535420.0, Z 1352.9+5409, TC 295, [M98c] 135255.2+540858

UGC 8837 (also known as Holmberg IV) is a dwarf galaxy located in the constellation of Ursa Major, 24 million light years away from Earth. It is a member of the M101 Group, a group containing several galaxies orbiting the largest, the Pinwheel Galaxy (M101).

It is possible UGC 8837 is one of the galaxies that interacted with the Pinwheel Galaxy and, together with NGC 5474 and NGC 5477, initiated a burst of star formation.

== See also ==
- M101 Group, a group which UGC 8837 belongs
- Pinwheel Galaxy, the central and largest galaxy in M101 group
