= Pinwheel Galaxy =

Galaxy in the constellation Ursa Major

- The Pinwheel Galaxy, as taken by Hubble Space Telescope

Observation data (J2000 epoch)
- Constellation: Ursa Major
- Right ascension: 14^{h} 03^{m} 12.5441^{s}
- Declination: +54° 20′ 56.220″
- Redshift: 0.000804
- Heliocentric radial velocity: 241 ± 2 km/s
- Distance: 21.6 ± 0.28 Mly (6.644 ± 0.087 Mpc)
- Apparent magnitude (V): 7.9

Characteristics
- Type: SAB(rs)cd HII
- Number of stars: 1 trillion (10^{12})
- Size: 252,000 ly (77.31 kpc) (diameter; 4050 Å high surface brightness level)
- Apparent size (V): 28.8′ × 26.9′

Other designations
- Messier 101, M101, IRAS 14013+5435, NGC 5457, Arp 26, UGC 8981, MCG +09-23-028, PGC 50063, CGCG 272-021, VV 456

The Pinwheel Galaxy (also known as Messier 101, M101 or NGC 5457) is a face-on, counterclockwise intermediate spiral galaxy located 21 million light-years (6.4 megaparsecs) from Earth in the constellation Ursa Major. It was discovered by Pierre Méchain in 1781 (Note: on March 27) and was communicated that year to Charles Messier, who verified its position for inclusion in the Messier Catalogue as one of its final entries.

On February 28, 2006, NASA and the European Space Agency released a very detailed image of the Pinwheel Galaxy, which was the largest and most detailed image of a galaxy by Hubble Space Telescope at the time. The image was composed of 51 individual exposures, plus some extra ground-based photos.

== Discovery ==
Pierre Méchain, the discoverer of the galaxy, described it as a "nebula without star, very obscure and pretty large, 6' to 7' in diameter, between the left hand of Bootes and the tail of the great Bear. It is difficult to distinguish when one illuminates the [grating] wires."

William Herschel wrote in 1784 that the galaxy was one of several which "...in my 7-, 10-, and 20-feet [focal length] reflectors shewed a mottled kind of nebulosity, which I shall call resolvable; so that I expect my present telescope will, perhaps, render the stars visible of which I suppose them to be composed."

Lord Rosse observed the galaxy with his 72-inch-diameter Newtonian reflector during the second half of the 19th century. He was the first to make extensive note of the spiral structure and made several sketches.

Though the galaxy can be detected with binoculars or a small telescope, to observe the spiral structure in a telescope without a camera requires a fairly large instrument, very dark skies, and a low-power eyepiece.

== Structure and composition ==
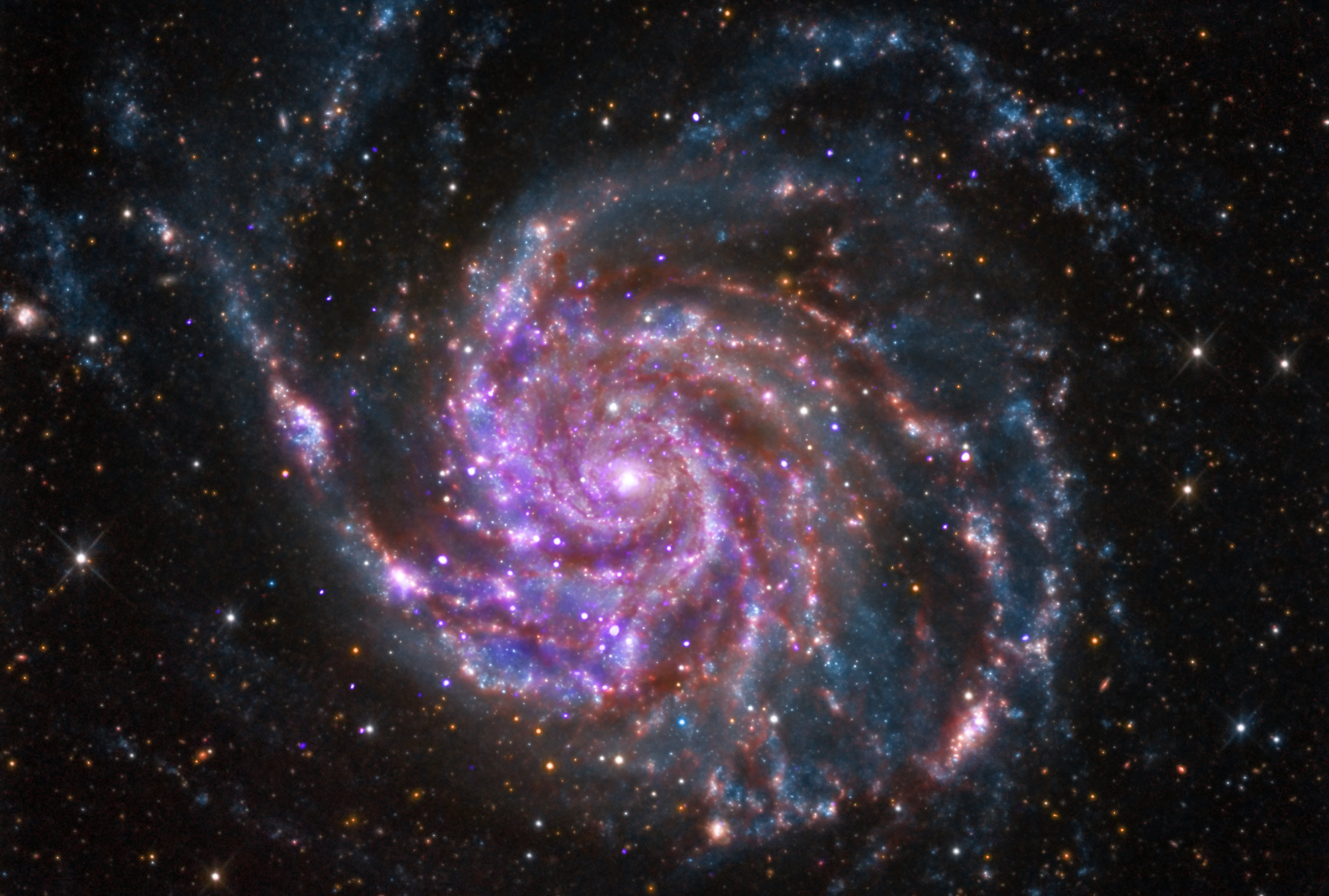
M101 – combined infrared, visible, and X-ray images

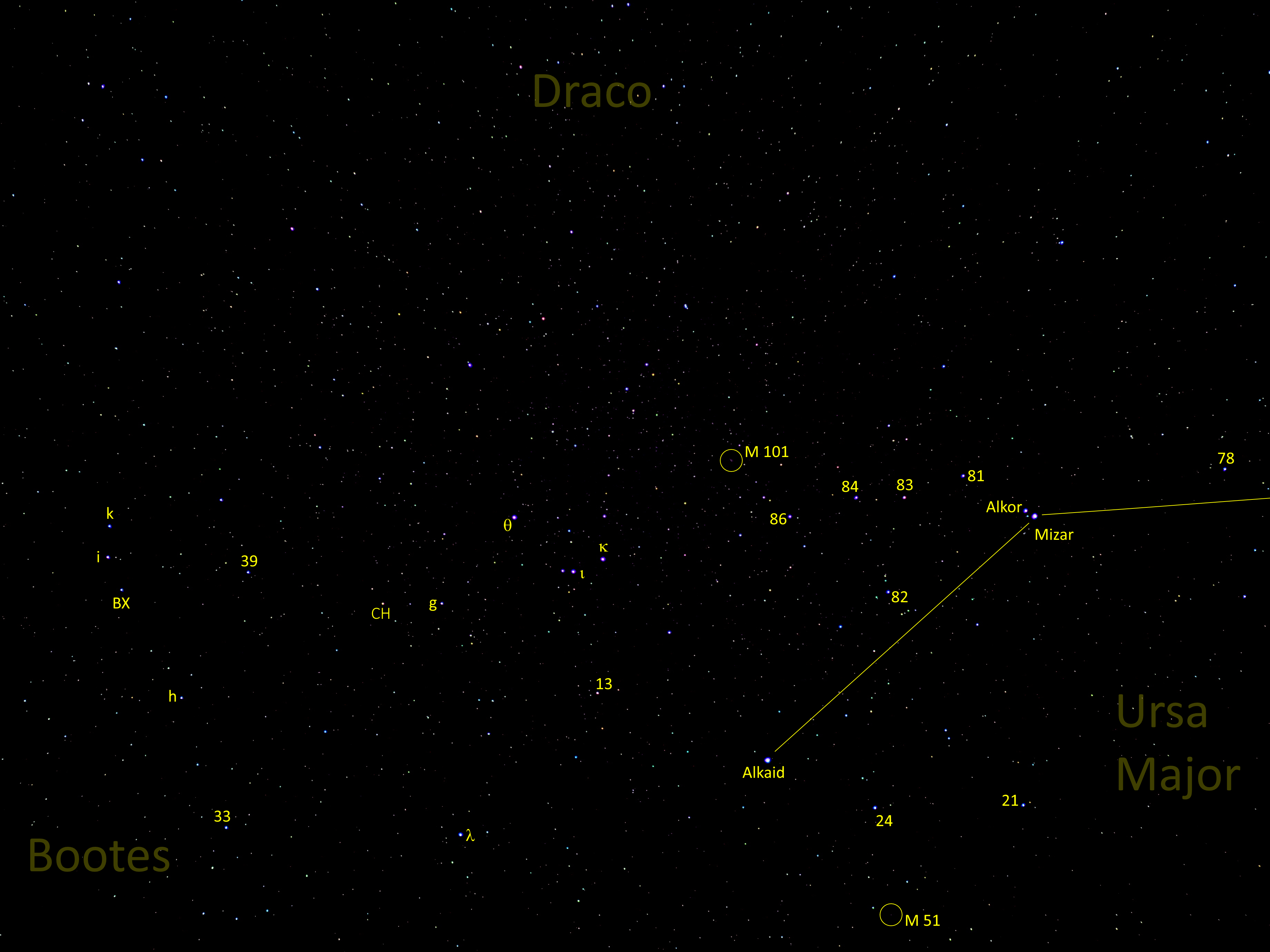
Dark sky image with some objects around Pinwheel Galaxy (M 101). The quarter in the lower right shows the tail of Ursa Major with the stars Mizar, Alcor and Alkaid.

M101 is a large galaxy, with a diameter of 252,000 light-years. By comparison, the Milky Way has a diameter of 87,400 light-years. It has around a trillion stars. It has a disk mass on the order of 100 billion solar masses, along with a small central bulge of about 3 billion solar masses. Its characteristics can be compared to those of Andromeda Galaxy.

M101 has a high population of H II regions, many of which are very large and bright. H II regions usually accompany the enormous clouds of high density molecular hydrogen gas contracting under their own gravitational force where stars form. H II regions are ionized by large numbers of extremely bright and hot young stars; those in M101 are capable of creating hot superbubbles. In a 1990 study, 1,264 H II regions were cataloged in the galaxy. Three are prominent enough to receive New General Catalogue numbers—NGC 5461, NGC 5462, and NGC 5471.

M101 is asymmetrical due to the tidal forces from interactions with its companion galaxies. These gravitational interactions compress interstellar hydrogen gas, which then triggers strong star formation activity in M101's spiral arms that can be detected in ultraviolet images.

In 2001, the X-ray source P98, located in M101, was identified as an ultra-luminous X-ray source—a source more powerful than any single star but less powerful than a whole galaxy—using the Chandra X-ray Observatory. It received the designation M101 ULX-1. In 2005, Hubble and XMM-Newton observations showed the presence of an optical counterpart, strongly indicating that M101 ULX-1 is an X-ray binary. Further observations showed that the system deviated from expected models—the black hole is just 20 to 30 solar masses, and consumes material (including captured stellar wind) at a higher rate than theory suggests.

It is estimated that M101 has about 150 globular clusters, the same as the number of the Milky Way's globular clusters.

== Companion galaxies ==
M101 has six prominent companion galaxies: NGC 5204, NGC 5474, NGC 5477, NGC 5585, UGC 8837 and UGC 9405. As stated above, the gravitational interaction between it and its satellites may have spawned its grand design pattern. The galaxy has probably distorted the second-listed companion. The list comprises most or all of the M101 Group.

== Supernovae and luminous red nova ==
Six supernovae have been recorded in M101:

- SN 1909A (type unknown, mag. 10) was discovered by Max Wolf on 21 February 1909.
- SN 1951H (type unknown, mag. 17.5) was discovered by Milton Humason on a photographic plate taken on 3 February 1951. Analysis of the light curve suggested that the supernova was probably of Type II, with maximum magnitude of 11 to 12 occurring around October 1950.
- SN 1970G (Type II, mag. 11.5) was discovered by Miklós Lovas on 30 July 1970.
- SN 2011fe (Type Ia, mag. 17.2) was discovered by the Palomar Transient Factory on 24 August 2011. Initially designated PTF 11kly, it reached visual magnitude 9.9 at its peak, making it the brightest supernova of 2011.
- M101 OT2015-1 (also known as AT 2015dl), a luminous red nova, was discovered by Dumitru Ciprian Vîntdevară on 10 February 2015.
- SN 2023ixf (Type II, mag. 14.9) was discovered by Kōichi Itagaki on 19 May 2023, and immediately classified as a Type II supernova.
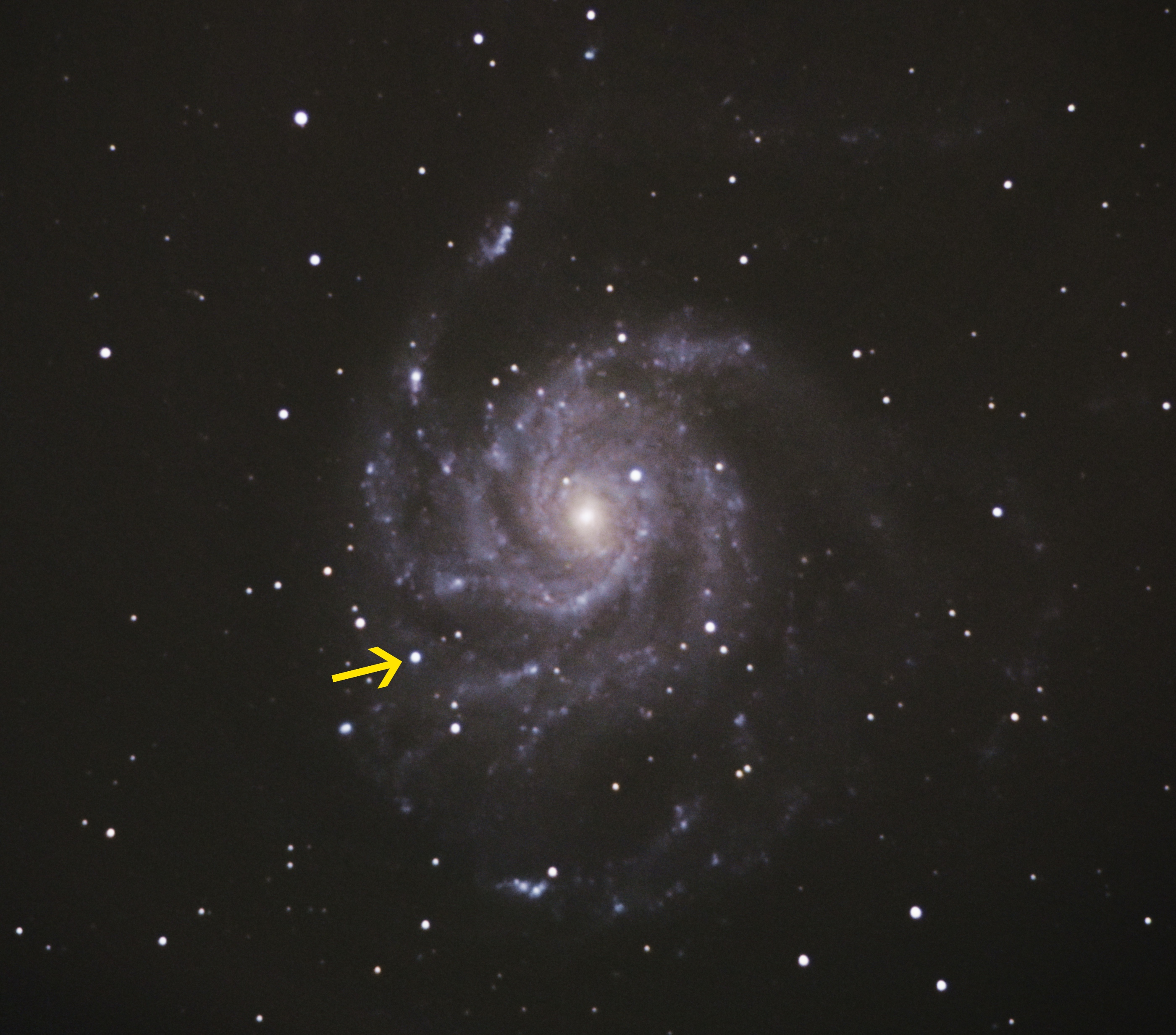
Type Ia supernova SN 2011fe from August 2011

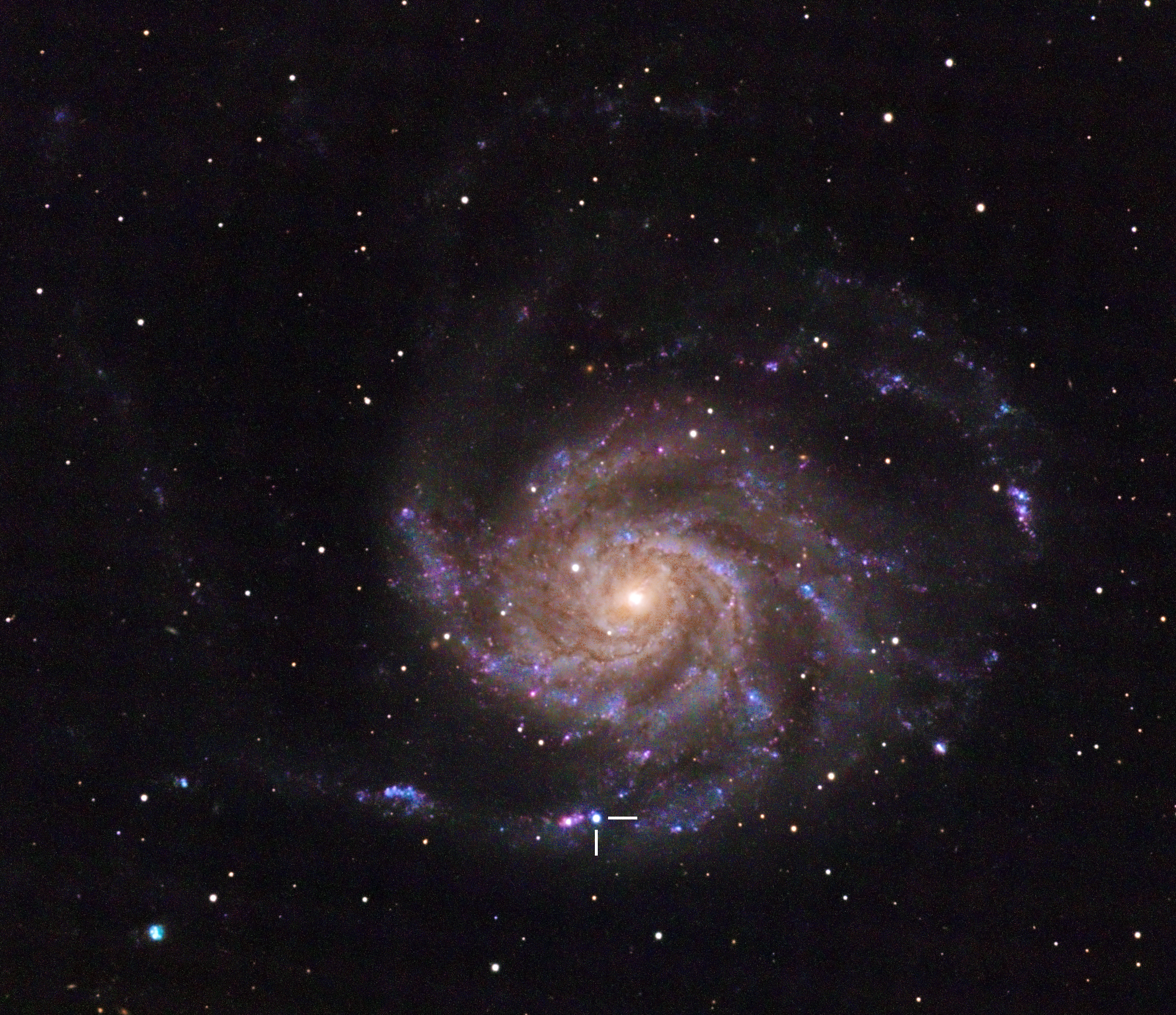
Type II supernova SN 2023ixf from May 2023

== See also ==
- List of Messier objects
- Messier 74 – Face-on spiral galaxy in the constellation Pisces – a similar face-on spiral galaxy
- Messier 83 – Galaxy in the constellation Hydra – a similar face-on spiral galaxy that is sometimes called the Southern Pinwheel Galaxy
- Messier 99 – Galaxy in the constellation Coma Berenices – a similar face-on spiral galaxy
- Triangulum Galaxy – Spiral galaxy in the constellation Triangulum – another galaxy sometimes called the Pinwheel Galaxy
