= SN 2023ixf =

Supernova in the Pinwheel Galaxy

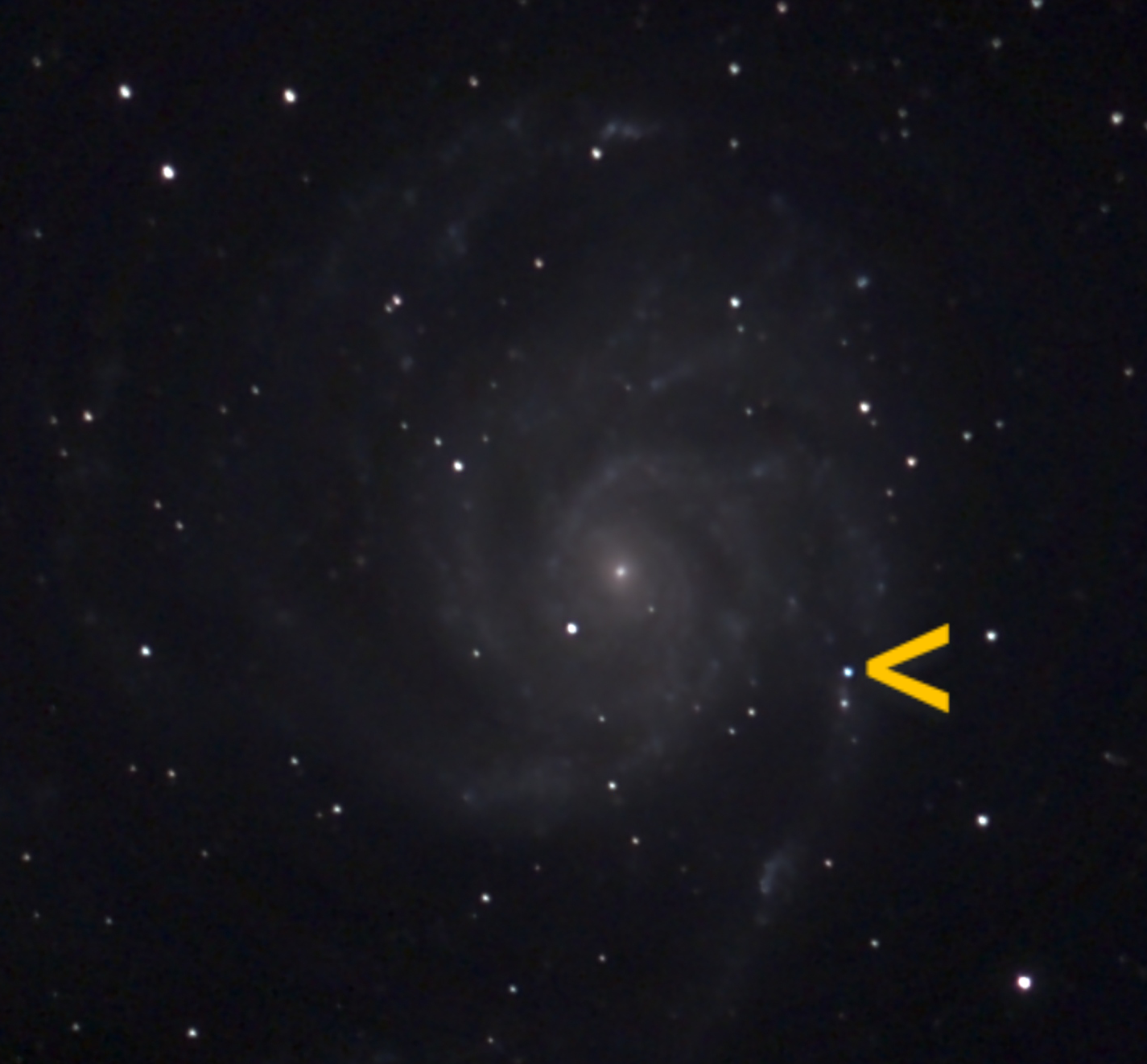
- Supernova 2023ixf as seen on 20 May 2023
- Event type: Type II supernova
- Type II Supernova
- Date: 19 May 2023, 17:27 UTC by Kōichi Itagaki
- Constellation: Ursa Major
- Right ascension: 14^{h} 03^{m} 38.562^{s}
- Declination: +54° 18′ 41.94″
- Epoch: J2000
- Distance: c. 21 million ly
- Host: Pinwheel Galaxy
- Progenitor: Supergiant (M=–4.66)
- Peak apparent magnitude: 10.8 (on 22 May 2023)
- Related media on Commons

SN 2023ixf was a Type II-L (core collapse) supernova located 21 million light years away from Earth in the Pinwheel Galaxy in the constellation of Ursa Major. It was one of the brightest core collapse supernova to have occurred in the 21st century with an energy output of (0.3–1.4)×10^{51} ergs. Before becoming a supernova, the progenitor star is believed to have been a supergiant with an absolute magnitude in the near-infrared (814nm) of M_{F814W} = –4.66. It is expected that SN 2023ixf has left behind either a neutron star or black hole based on current stellar evolution models.

The supernova is located near a prominent HII region, NGC 5461, in an outer spiral arm of the bright galaxy Messier 101.

The supernova ejecta produced during the nebular phase contained <0.65 solar masses of the element oxygen, travelling at a speed of 2,250 kilometers per second which is consistent with models of a lower mass progenitor red supergiant star. The luminosity was powered by an estimated 0.049 solar masses of the isotope nickel-56. Its spectrum showed broad calcium profiles which dominated later stages of the nebular phase and a broad but complex multi-peaked hydrogen profile. The ejected hydrogen showed high velocity (6,000 kilometers per second) emission features which may be evidence of interaction with a dense region of hydrogen located at an extended distance.

== Discovery and History ==
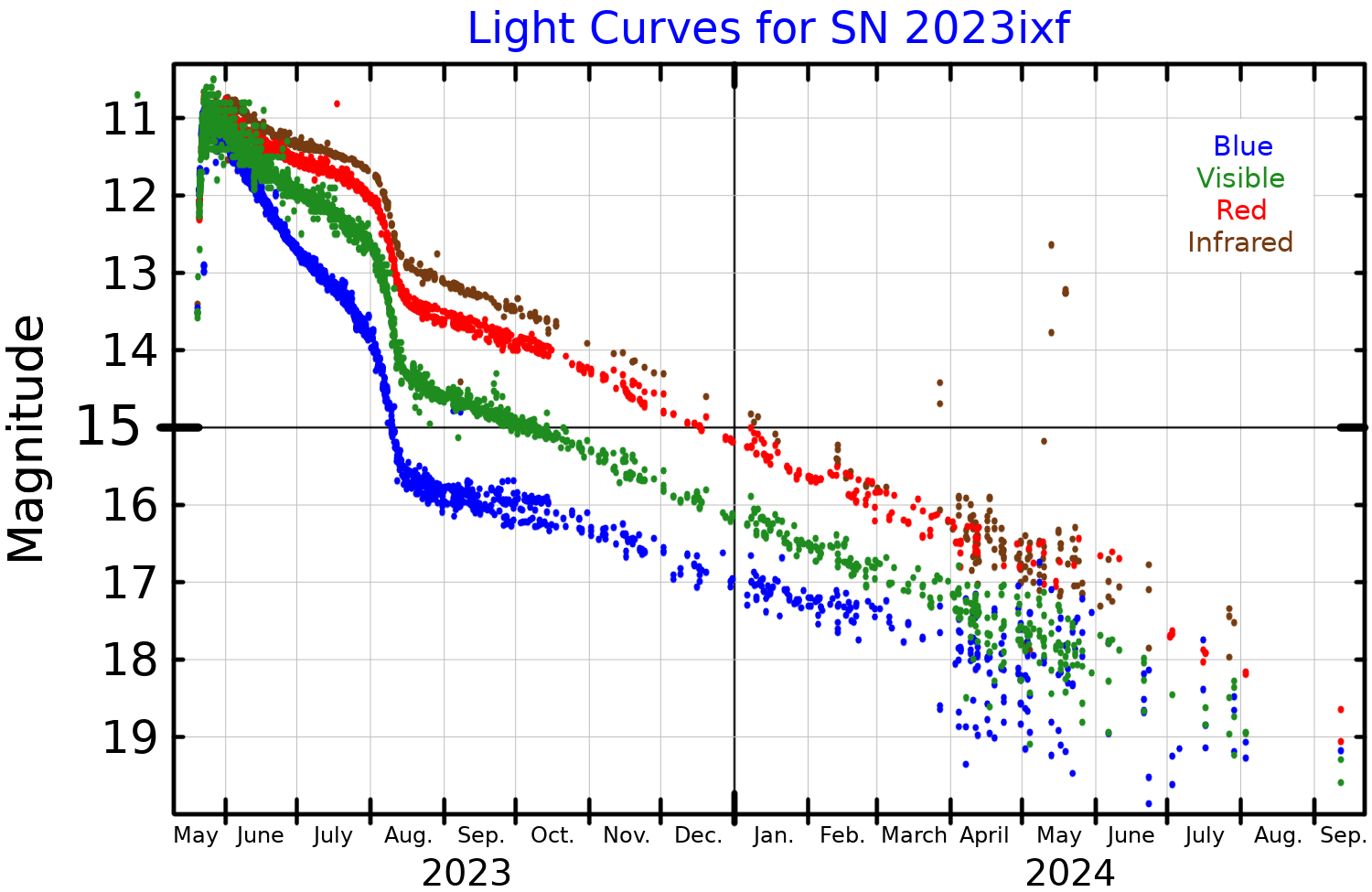
Light curves for SN 2023ixf in four photometric bands, plotted from AAVSO data

SN 2023ixf was first observed on 19 May 2023 by Kōichi Itagaki and immediately classified as a Type II supernova. The apparent magnitude at discovery was 14.9. After discovery, the Zwicky Transient Facility project found a precovery image of the supernova at magnitude 15.87 two days before discovery.

By 22 May 2023, SN 2023ixf had brightened to about magnitude 11. It could be seen in telescopes as small as 114 mm (4.5 in) and remained visible with backyard telescopes for several months. The supernova started to fade around 10 June 2023.

The last supernova that close to Earth occurred 9 years previously: SN 2014J in Messier 82, roughly 12 million light-years from Earth.

Recently observed supernovae as bright as SN 2023ixf
Supernova	Galaxy	Distance	Type	Peak apmag
SN 2023ixf	Pinwheel Galaxy (M101)	21 Mly (6.4 Mpc)	II	10.8
SN 2014J	M82 (Cigar Galaxy)	12 Mly (3.7 Mpc)	Ia	10.1
SN 2011fe	Pinwheel Galaxy (M101)	21 Mly (6.4 Mpc)	Ia	9.9

== Image gallery ==
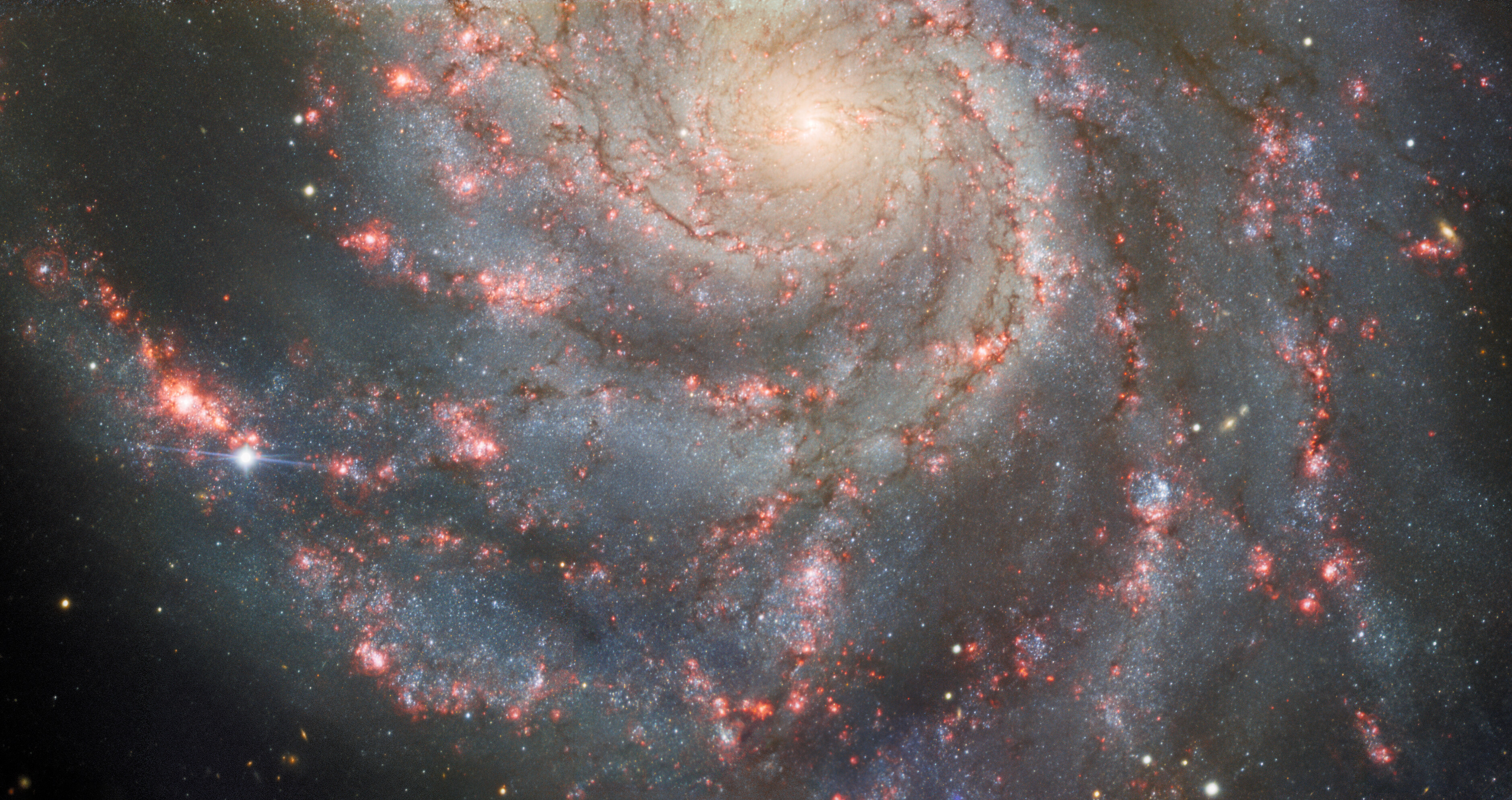
Gemini North Observatory image of SN 2023ixf.

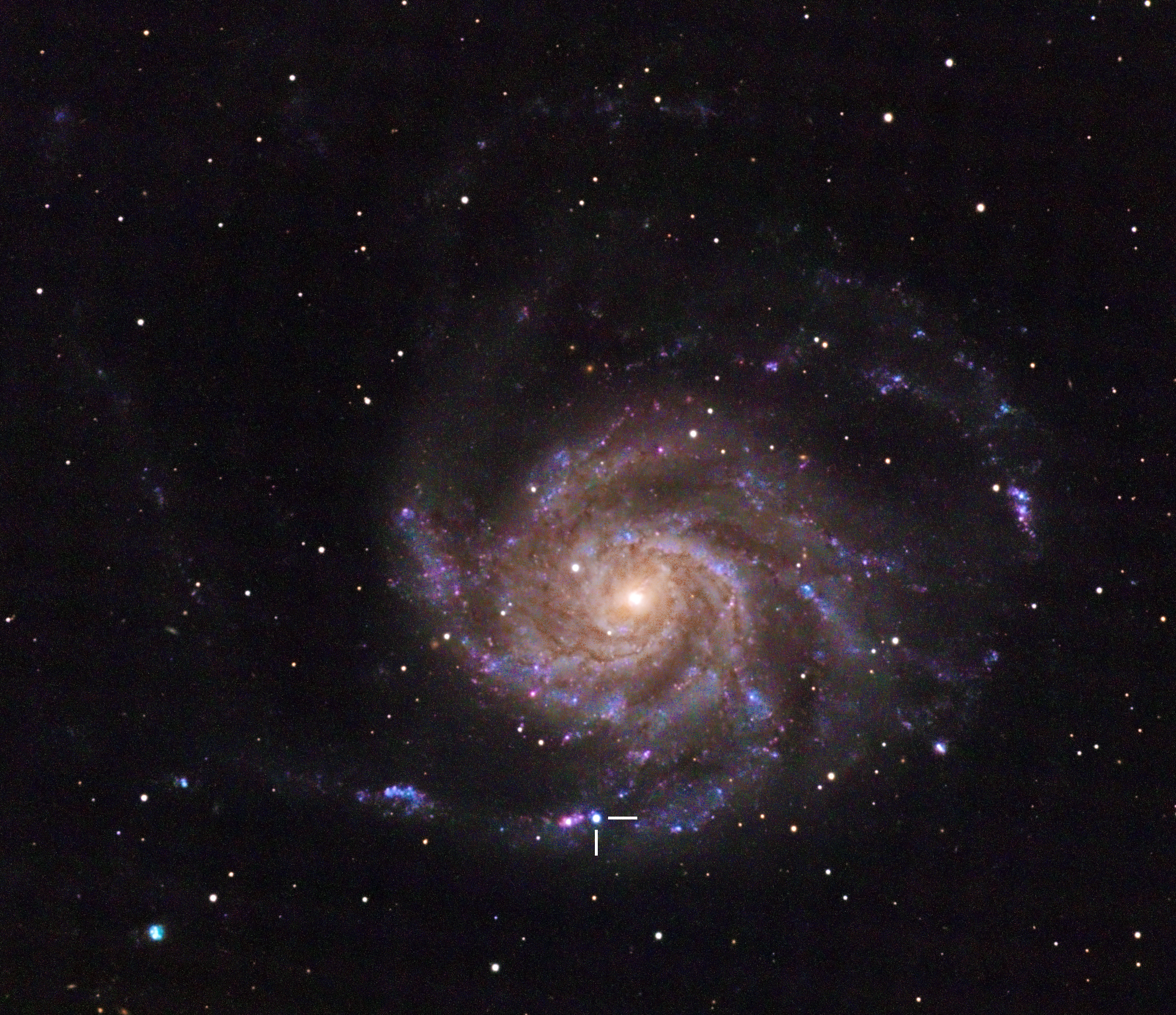
SN2023ixf imaged one day after its discovery

== See also ==
- SN 1987A
