= Magellanic spiral =

Spiral galaxies with one spiral arm

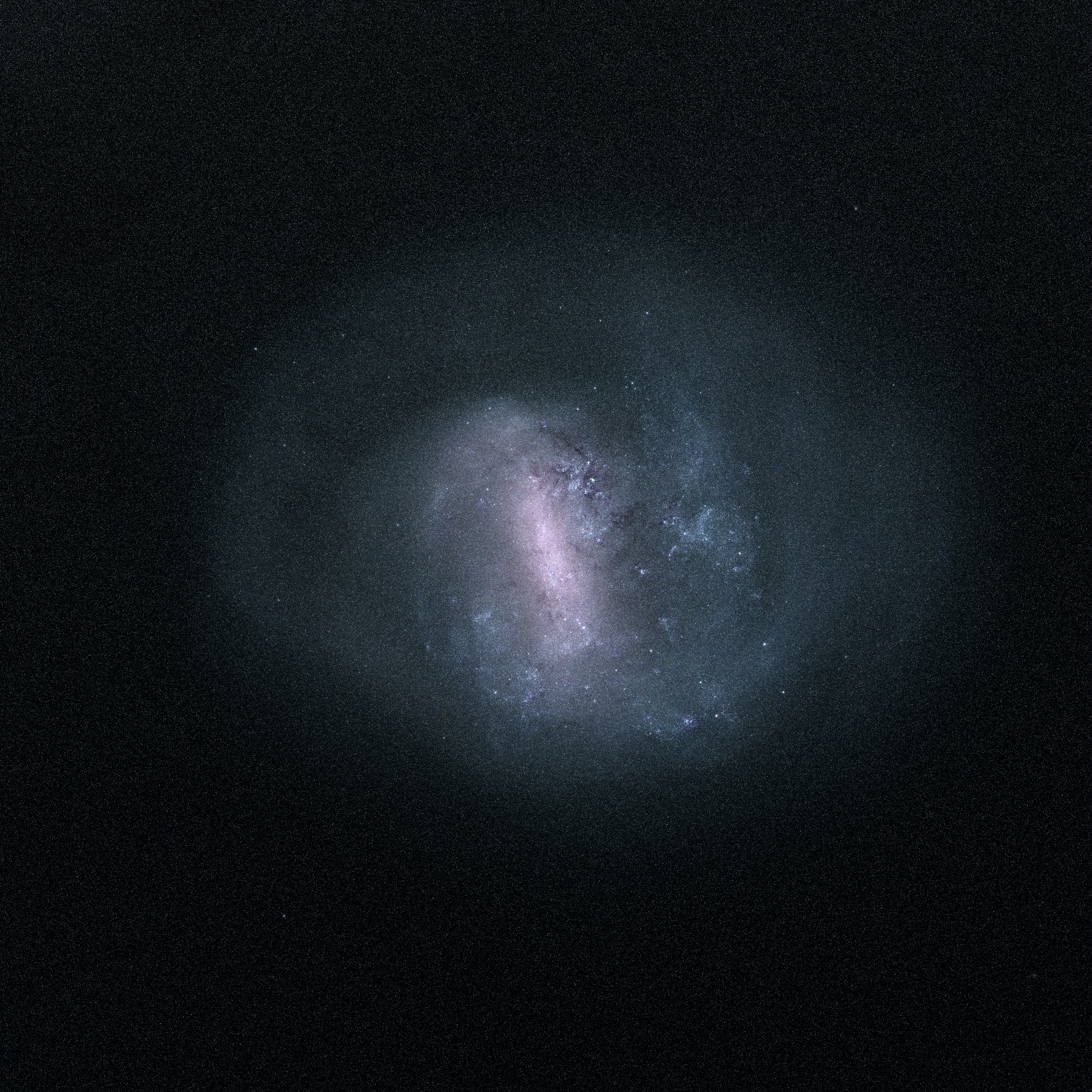
The Large Magellanic Cloud is the prototype of a Magellanic spiral galaxy

A Magellanic spiral galaxy is a spiral galaxy with only one spiral arm. Magellanic spiral galaxies are classified as the type Sm (with sub-categories SAm, SBm, SABm); the prototype galaxy and namesake for Magellanic spirals is the Large Magellanic Cloud, an SBm galaxy. They are usually smaller dwarf galaxies and can be considered to be intermediate between dwarf spiral galaxies and irregular galaxies. They are found in proximity to larger spiral galaxies such as the Milky Way, as is the case with the LMC and the Small Magellanic Cloud (SMC).

Magellanic spiral galaxies also have a stratified stellar structure; main sequence stars are found in their spiral arm, and supergiants are clustered in a thick rectangular bar across the middle.

== Magellanic spirals ==
SAm galaxies are a type of unbarred spiral galaxy, while SBm are a type of barred spiral galaxy. SABm are a type of intermediate spiral galaxy.

Type Sm and Im galaxies have also been categorized as irregular galaxies with some structure (type Irr-1). Sm galaxies are typically disrupted and asymmetric. dSm galaxies are dwarf spiral galaxies or dwarf irregular galaxies, depending on categorization scheme.

The Magellanic spiral classification was introduced by Gerard de Vaucouleurs, along with Magellanic irregular (Im), when he revamped the Hubble classification of galaxies.

== Grades of Magellanic spiral galaxies ==
Example	Type	Image	Information and Notes
Magellanic Spirals
	SAdm		
NGC 5204	SAm		Satellite of Pinwheel Galaxy
NGC 4676A	SABdm		Part of a galaxy merger, to the left of it is the galaxy NGC 4676B.
NGC 4625	SABm		It has only one spiral arm. In ultraviolet it extends four times farther than in visible light.
NGC 4236	SBdm		In M81 Group
Large Magellanic Cloud	SBm		Prototype galaxy for this galaxy class, and satellite of Milky Way
	Sdm		
	Sm		
Dwarf Magellanic Spirals
	dSAdm		
	dSAm		
	dSABdm		
	dSABm		
	dSBdm		
	dSBm		
	dSdm		
NGC 5474	dSm		Satellite of Pinwheel Galaxy

== List of Magellanic spirals ==
=== Barred (SBm) ===
- Large Magellanic Cloud (LMC; prototype galaxy)
- Small Magellanic Cloud (SMC)
- NGC 1311
- NGC 4618
- NGC 4236
- NGC 55
- NGC 4214
- NGC 3109
- IC 4710

=== Intermediate (SABm) ===
- NGC 4625
- NGC 5713

=== Unbarred (SAm) ===
- NGC 5204
- NGC 2552

== See also ==
- Galaxy morphological classification
