= NGC 7364 =

Galaxy in the constellation Aquarius

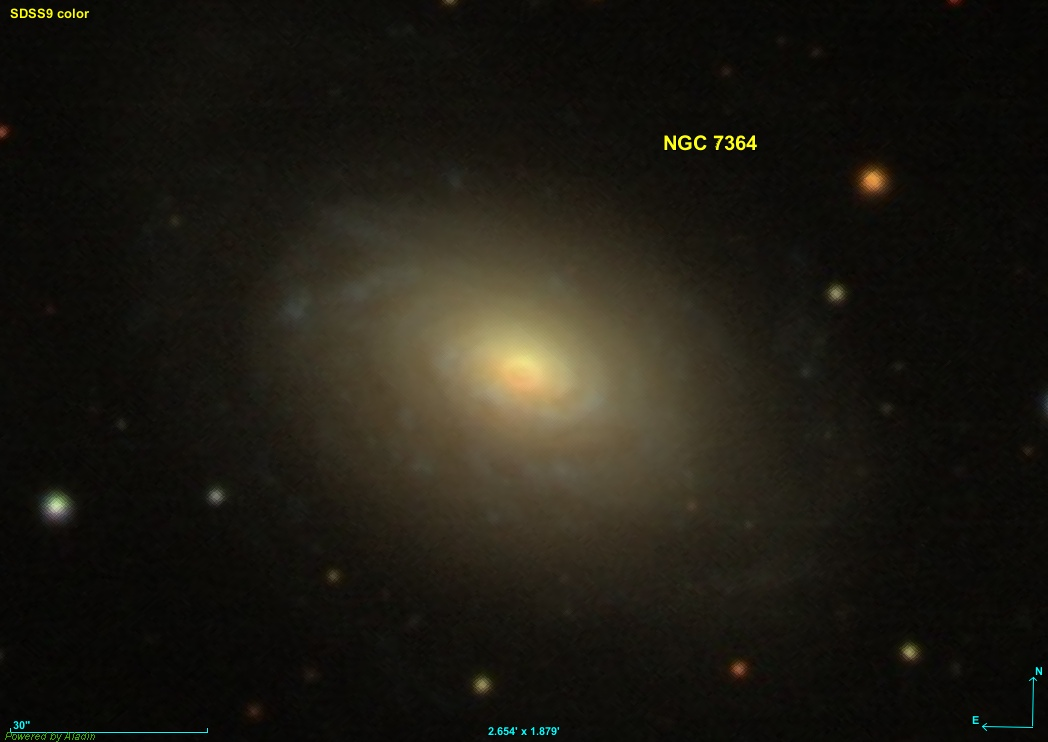
- NGC 7364 imaged by SDSS

Observation data (J2000 epoch)
- Constellation: Aquarius
- Right ascension: 22^{h} 44^{m} 24.3670^{s}
- Declination: −00° 09′ 43.680″
- Redshift: 0.016161±0.00000578
- Heliocentric radial velocity: 4,845±2 km/s
- Distance: 230.27 ± 29.46 Mly (70.600 ± 9.034 Mpc)
- Apparent magnitude (V): 13.4g

Characteristics
- Type: S0/a pec
- Size: ~119,100 ly (36.52 kpc) (estimated)
- Apparent size (V): 1.5′ × 0.95′

Other designations
- UGC 12174, MCG +00-58-001, PGC 69630, CGCG 379-002

NGC 7364 is a spiral galaxy in the constellation of Aquarius. Its velocity with respect to the cosmic microwave background is 4,480±26 km/s, which corresponds to a Hubble distance of 215.5 ± 15.1 Mly (66.07 ± 4.64 Mpc). Additionally, six non-redshift measurements give a farther mean distance of 230.27 ± 29.46 Mly (70.600 ± 9.034 Mpc). It was discovered by German-British astronomer William Herschel on 1 October 1785.

NGC 7364 is a radio galaxy, i.e. it has giant regions of radio emission extending well beyond its visible structure.

== Supernovae ==
Three supernovae have been observed in NGC 7364:

- SN 2006lc (Type Ib/c, mag. 20.2) was discovered by the SDSS Collaboration, and by the Lick Observatory Supernova Search (LOSS), on 21 October 2006.
- SN 2009fk (Type Ia, mag. 18.5) was discovered by LOSS on 29 May 2009.
- SN 2011im (Type Ia, mag. 18.5) was discovered by Japanese astronomer Kōichi Itagaki on 26 November 2011.

== See also ==
- List of NGC objects (7001–7840)
