= NGC 7315 =

Galaxy in the constellation of Pegasus

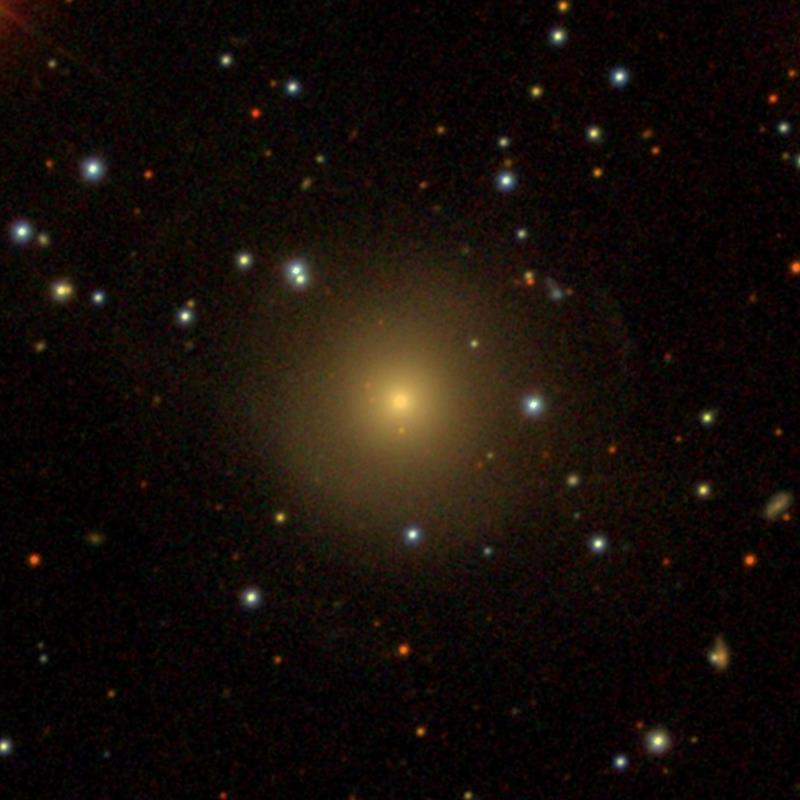
- SDSS image of NGC 7315

Observation data (J2000 epoch)
- Constellation: Pegasus
- Right ascension: 22^{h} 35^{m} 31.692^{s}
- Declination: +34° 48′ 12.81″
- Redshift: 0.021055
- Heliocentric radial velocity: 6312 km/s
- Distance: 282.9 Mly (86.75 Mpc)
- Apparent magnitude (B): 13.8
- Magnitude (J): 10.688
- Magnitude (H): 10.113
- Magnitude (K): 9.725

Characteristics
- Type: S0
- Size: 143,200 ly (43,920 pc) (Note: RC3 D_{0} (blue) values used.)
- Apparent size (V): 1.6′ × 1.6′

Other designations
- UGC 12097, MGC+06-49-037, PGC 69241

NGC 7315 is a lenticular galaxy in the constellation of Pegasus. It was discovered on 11 September 1872 by Édouard Stephan. It was described as "very faint, extremely small, round, brighter middle" by John Louis Emil Dreyer, the compiler of the New General Catalogue.

One supernova has been observed in NGC 7315: SN 2007B (type Ia, mag. 16.7) was discovered on 5 January 2007 by Kōichi Itagaki.

== See also ==
- List of NGC objects (7001–7840)
