= NGC 682 =

Galaxy in the constellation Cetus

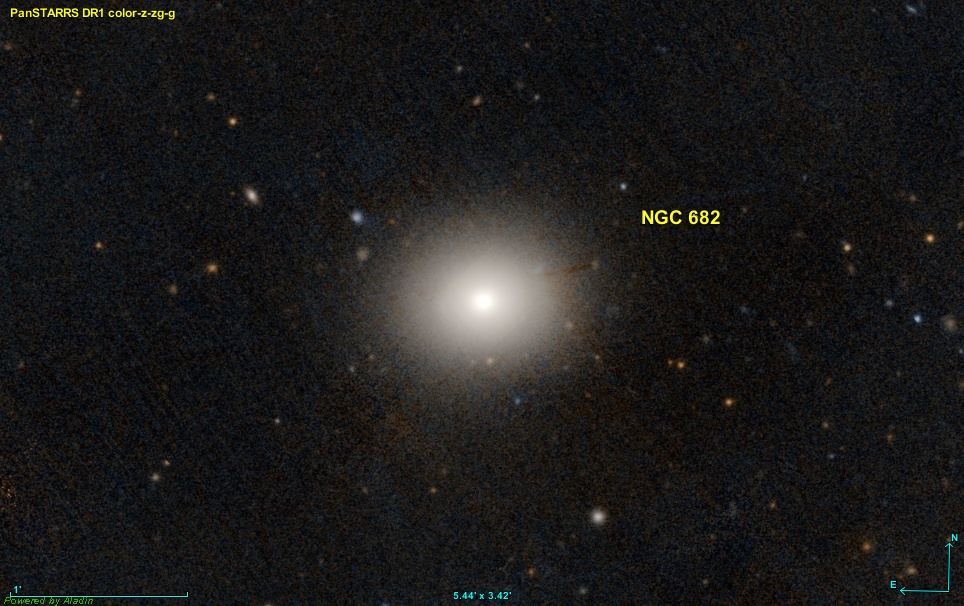
- NGC 682 imaged by Pan-STARRS

Observation data (J2000 epoch)
- Constellation: Cetus
- Right ascension: 01^{h} 40^{m} 04.5754^{s}
- Declination: −14° 58′ 29.019″
- Redshift: 0.018686
- Heliocentric radial velocity: 5602 ± 19 km/s
- Distance: 256.8 ± 18.0 Mly (78.73 ± 5.53 Mpc)
- Apparent magnitude (V): 13.4

Characteristics
- Type: SA0-
- Size: ~105,900 ly (32.46 kpc) (estimated)
- Apparent size (V): 1.4′ × 1.1′

Other designations
- 2MASX J01490460-1458295, MCG -03-05-022, PGC 6663

NGC 682 is a lenticular galaxy in the constellation of Cetus. Its velocity with respect to the cosmic microwave background is 5,338 ± 26 km/s, which corresponds to a Hubble distance of 78.7 ± 5.5 Mpc (~257 million light-years). It was discovered by German-British astronomer William Herschel on 30 December 1785.

One supernova has been observed in NGC 682: SN 2023xtg (Type Ia, mag. 18.1) was discovered by Kōichi Itagaki on 14 November 2023.

== See also ==
- List of NGC objects (1–1000)
