= M101 Group =

Loose group of galaxies in the constellation Ursa Major

- The Pinwheel Galaxy, the brightest galaxy in the M101 Group

Observation data (Epoch J2000)
- Constellation: Ursa Major
- Right ascension: 14^{h} 04^{m}
- Declination: +54° 31′
- Brightest member: Pinwheel Galaxy
- Number of galaxies: 7-9

Other designations
- NGC 5457 Group, LGG 371, NOGG H 758, NOGG P1 766, NOGG P2 781

The M101 Group is a loose group of galaxies located in the constellation Ursa Major. The group is named after the brightest galaxy in the group, the Pinwheel Galaxy (M101). Most of the other members of the group are companions of the Pinwheel Galaxy. The group itself is one of many located within the Virgo Supercluster (i.e. the Local Supercluster), within Coma–Sculptor Cloud.

== Members ==
The table below lists galaxies that have been consistently identified as group members in the Nearby Galaxies Catalog, the survey of Fouque et al., the Lyons Groups of Galaxies (LGG) Catalog, and the three group lists created from the Nearby Optical Galaxy sample of Giuricin et al.

Members of the M101 Group
Name	Type	R.A. (J2000)	Dec. (J2000)	Redshift (km/s)	Apparent Magnitude
Pinwheel Galaxy (M101)	SAB(rs)cd	14^{h} 03^{m} 12.6^{s}	+54° 20′ 57″	241 ± 2	8.3
NGC 5204	SA(s)m	13^{h} 29^{m} 36.5^{s}	+58° 25′ 07″	201 ± 1	11.7
NGC 5474	SA(s)cd pec	14^{h} 05^{m} 01.6^{s}	+53° 39′ 44″	273 ± 9	11.3
NGC 5477	SA(s)m	14^{h} 05^{m} 33.2^{s}	+54° 27′ 39″	304 ± 5	14.4
NGC 5585	SAB(s)d	14^{h} 19^{m} 48.2^{s}	+56° 43′ 45″	293 ± 2	11.2
UGC 8837	IB(s)m	13^{h} 54^{m} 45.8^{s}	+53° 54′ 03″	144 ± 3	13.8
UGC 9405	Im	14^{h} 35^{m} 24.4^{s}	+57° 15′ 19″	222 ± 6	17

Other possible members galaxies (galaxies listed in only one or two of the lists from the above references) include the irregular galaxies NGC 5238 and UGC 8508.

== Nearby groups ==
The M51 Group, which includes the Whirlpool Galaxy (M51) and the Sunflower Galaxy (M63), is located to the southeast of the M101 Group, and the NGC 5866 Group is located to the northwest. The distances to these three groups (as determined from the distances to the individual member galaxies) are similar, which suggests that the M51 Group, the M101 Group, and the NGC 5866 Group are actually part of a single large, loose, elongated group. However, most group identification methods (including those used by the references cited above) identify these three groups as separate entities.

== See also ==
- Virgo Cluster
