= NGC 4454 =

Galaxy in the constellation Virgo

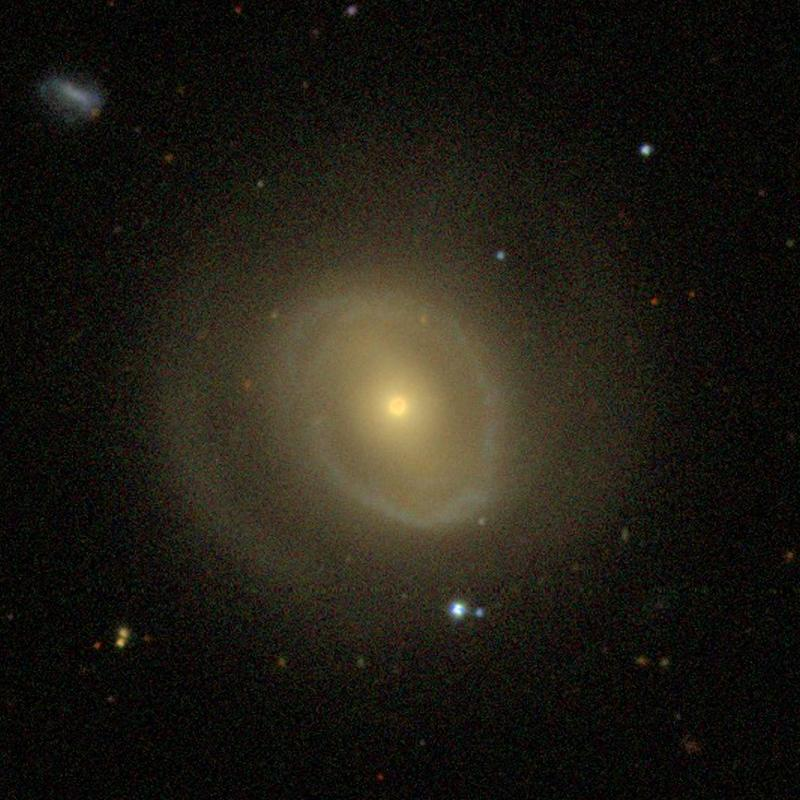
- The barred spiral galaxy NGC 4454.

Observation data (J2000 epoch)
- Constellation: Virgo
- Right ascension: 12^{h} 28^{m} 50.7^{s}
- Declination: −01° 56′ 21″
- Redshift: 0.008029/2407 km/s
- Distance: 122,977,400 ly
- Apparent magnitude (V): 13.2

Characteristics
- Type: (R)SB(r)0/a
- Size: ~ 74,373.6 ly
- Apparent size (V): 1.81 x 1.44

Other designations
- CGCG 14-48, IRAS 12262-0139, MCG 0-32-14, PGC 41083, UGC 7606

NGC 4454 is a barred spiral galaxy located about 123 million light-years away in the constellation of Virgo. NGC 4454 was discovered by astronomer William Herschel on 22 April 1784.

== Supernova ==
One supernova has been observed in NGC 4454:

- SN 2020abgq (Type Ia, mag. 16.3) was discovered by Kōichi Itagaki on 30 November 2020.

== See also ==
- List of NGC objects (4001–5000)
- NGC 4314
