= NGC 5486 =

Galaxy in the constellation Ursa Major

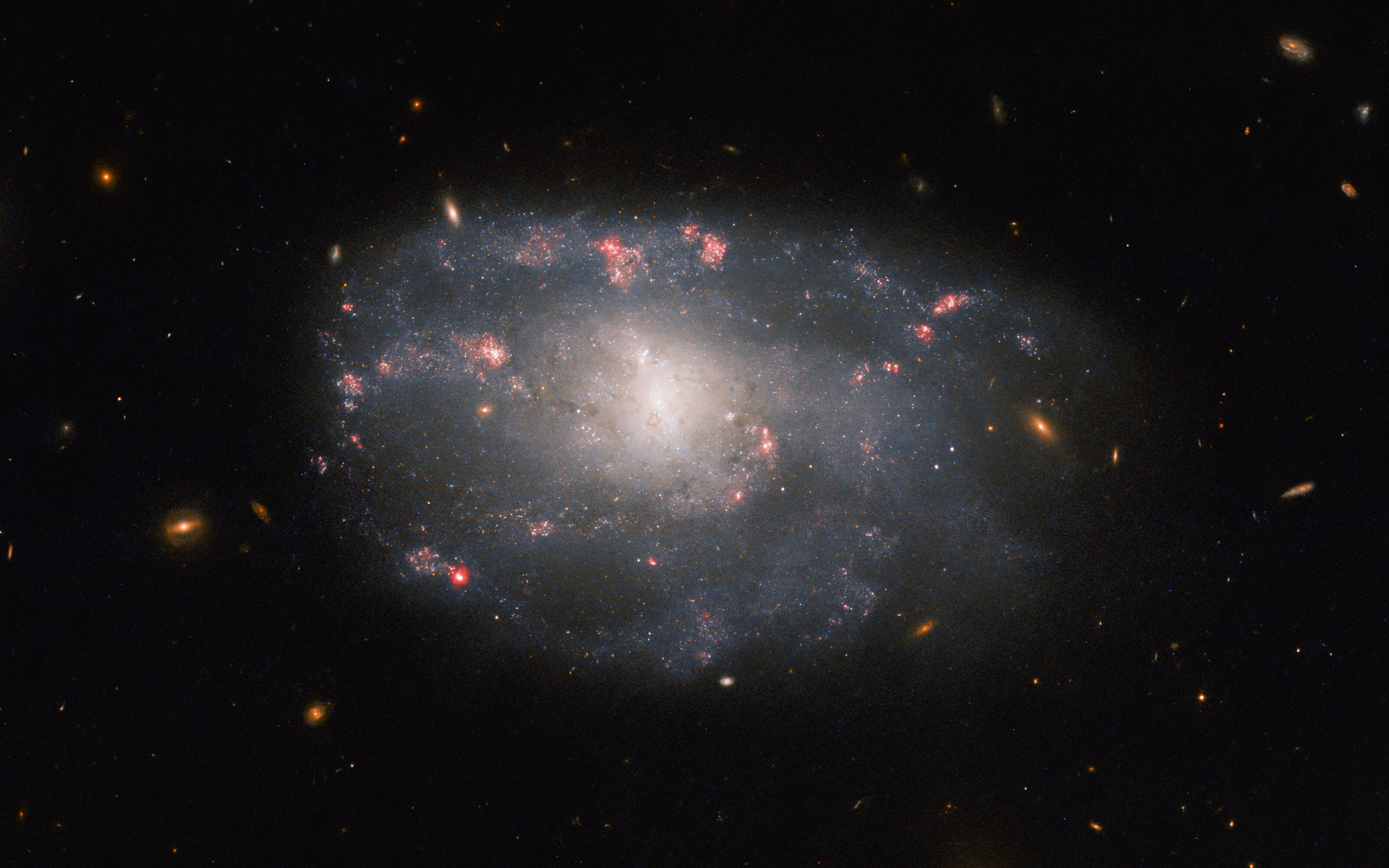
- Hubble Space Telescope image of NGC 5486

Observation data (J2000 epoch)
- Constellation: Ursa Major
- Right ascension: 14^{h} 07^{m} 25.0^{s}
- Declination: +55° 06′ 12″
- Redshift: 0.004563 ± 0.000017
- Apparent magnitude (V): 13.4

Characteristics
- Type: SA(s)m
- Apparent size (V): 2.3′ × 1.5′

Other designations
- NGC 5486, UGC 09036, PGC 050383

NGC 5486 is an irregular galaxy in the constellation Ursa Major 110 million light-years from Earth.

The galaxy is considered a member of the NGC 5485 group (LGG 373), and is near the much larger Pinwheel Galaxy.

It was discovered on 2 May 1785 by William Herschel with an 18.7-inch reflecting telescope, who described it as "F, cL" (faint, considerably large) in his catalogues of nebulae.

== Supernova ==
One supernova has been observed in NGC 5486: SN 2004 cm (Type II, mag. 18.8) was discovered by the Sloan Digital Sky Survey on 24 March 2004.
