= UGC 9405 =

Faint dwarf galaxy in the constellation Draco

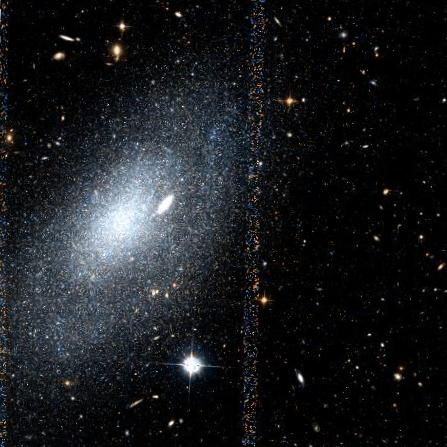
- Dwarf galaxy UGC 9405 taken by the Hubble Space Telescope.

Observation data (J2000 epoch)
- Constellation: Draco
- Right ascension: 14^{h} 35^{m} 24.077^{s}
- Declination: +57° 15′ 21.24″
- Redshift: 0.000741
- Heliocentric radial velocity: 222 ± 7 km/s
- Distance: 20.5 ± 1.2 Mly (6.30 ± 0.38 Mpc)
- Apparent magnitude (V): 14.08
- Apparent magnitude (B): 15.39

Characteristics
- Type: I

Other designations
- MCG +10-21-013, PGC 52142

UGC 9405 (also known as PGC 52142) is a faint dwarf irregular galaxy situated in the constellation of Draco. It is about 20.5 million light-years, or 6.3 megaparsecs, away from the Earth. It is listed as a member of the M101 Group, a group containing the several galaxies orbiting the largest, Pinwheel Galaxy (M101). However, due to its far distance from the Pinwheel Galaxy, its membership of the group is uncertain.
