= NGC 4236 =

Galaxy in the constellation Draco

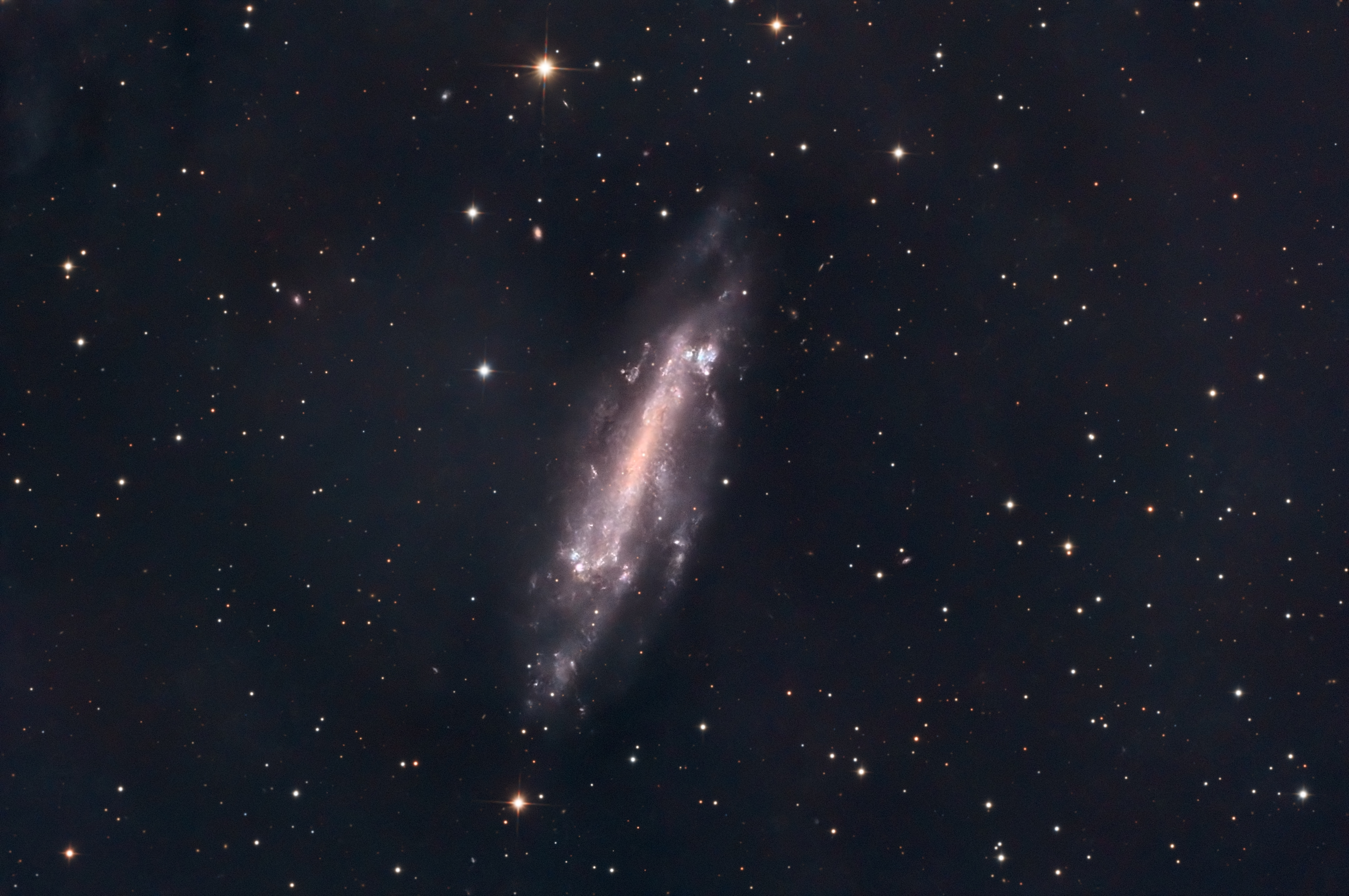
- High-resolution visible-light astrophotograph

Observation data (J2000 epoch)
- Constellation: Draco
- Right ascension: 12^{h} 16^{m} 42.1^{s}
- Declination: +69° 27′ 45″
- Redshift: 0 ± 2 km/s
- Apparent magnitude (V): 10.5

Characteristics
- Type: SB(s)dm
- Size: 74,000 ly (22.70 kpc)
- Apparent size (V): 21.9′ × 7.2′

Other designations
- UGC 7306, PGC 39346, Caldwell 3

NGC 4236 (also known as Caldwell 3) is a barred Magellanic spiral galaxy located in the constellation Draco. It was discovered in April 1793 by William Herschel.

The galaxy is a member of the M81 Group, a group of galaxies located at a distance of approximately 11.7 Mly (3.6 Mpc) from Earth. The group also contains the spiral galaxy Messier 81 and the starburst galaxy Messier 82. NGC 4236 is located away from the central part of the M81 group at a distance of 14.5 Mly (4.45 Mpc) from Earth. The galaxy includes a large number of bright emission nebulae, easily visible from Earth. Star formation is occurring throughout the entire galactic disc. The core contains very little star formation, however this is offset by an active galactic halo. Despite the lack of star formation in the core, it contains three point radio signals, which are hypothesized to be remnants of supernovae. An alternative theory suggests two of these sources could be from smaller-scale stellar formation and the remaining one is possibly a foreground G-type star.

== See also ==
- NGC 55 - a similar galaxy
