= UGC 8508 =

Irregular galaxy in the constellation Ursa Major

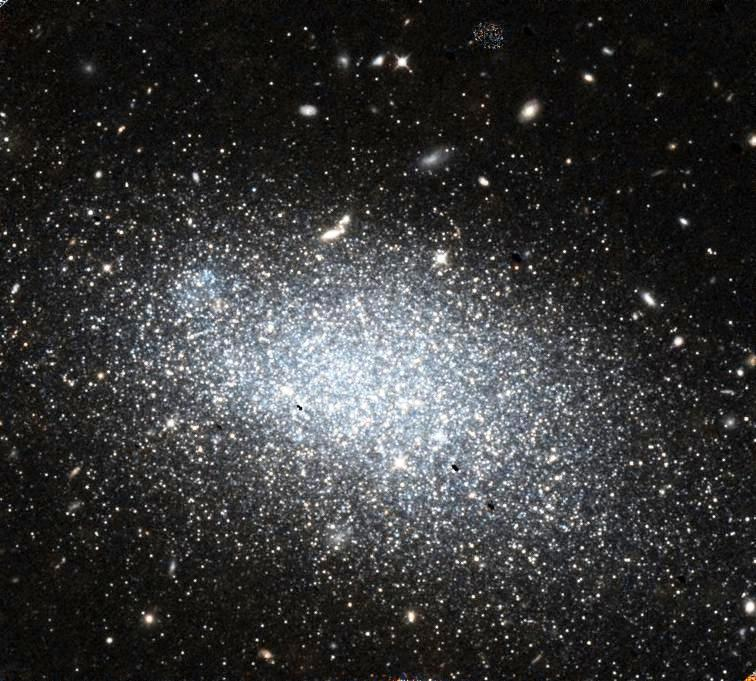
- UGC 8508 (Hubble Space Telescope)

Observation data (J2000 epoch)
- Constellation: Ursa Major
- Right ascension: 13^{h} 30^{m} 44.4^{s}
- Declination: +54° 54′ 36″
- Redshift: +198 km/s
- Distance: 8.500 ± 0.075 Mly (2.606 ± 0.023 Mpc)
- Apparent magnitude (V): 12.88

Characteristics
- Type: IAm
- Size: 1.29 kpc
- Apparent size (V): 1.7′ × 1.0'

Other designations
- I Zw 060, PGC 47495

UGC 8508 is a dwarf irregular galaxy located about 8.5 million light-years away from Earth in the constellation of Ursa Major. It is sometimes classified as a member of the M101 Group of galaxies and has a diameter of around 4.2 kly (1.29 kpc).

As an irregular galaxy, UGC 8508 does not exhibit any large scale organization in its structure. It has a bluish appearance when viewed in the visible spectrum and although it has a large number of H I regions, it has a relatively low-luminosity overall. However, the presence of a significant number of both blue and red supergiant stars indicate it is likely to have undergone a period of rapid star formation in the cosmologically recent past. The distribution of the supergiants suggests that star formation has largely ceased at distances greater than 1.3 kly (0.4 kpc) from the center of the galaxy.
