= NGC 55 =

Galaxy in the constellation Sculptor

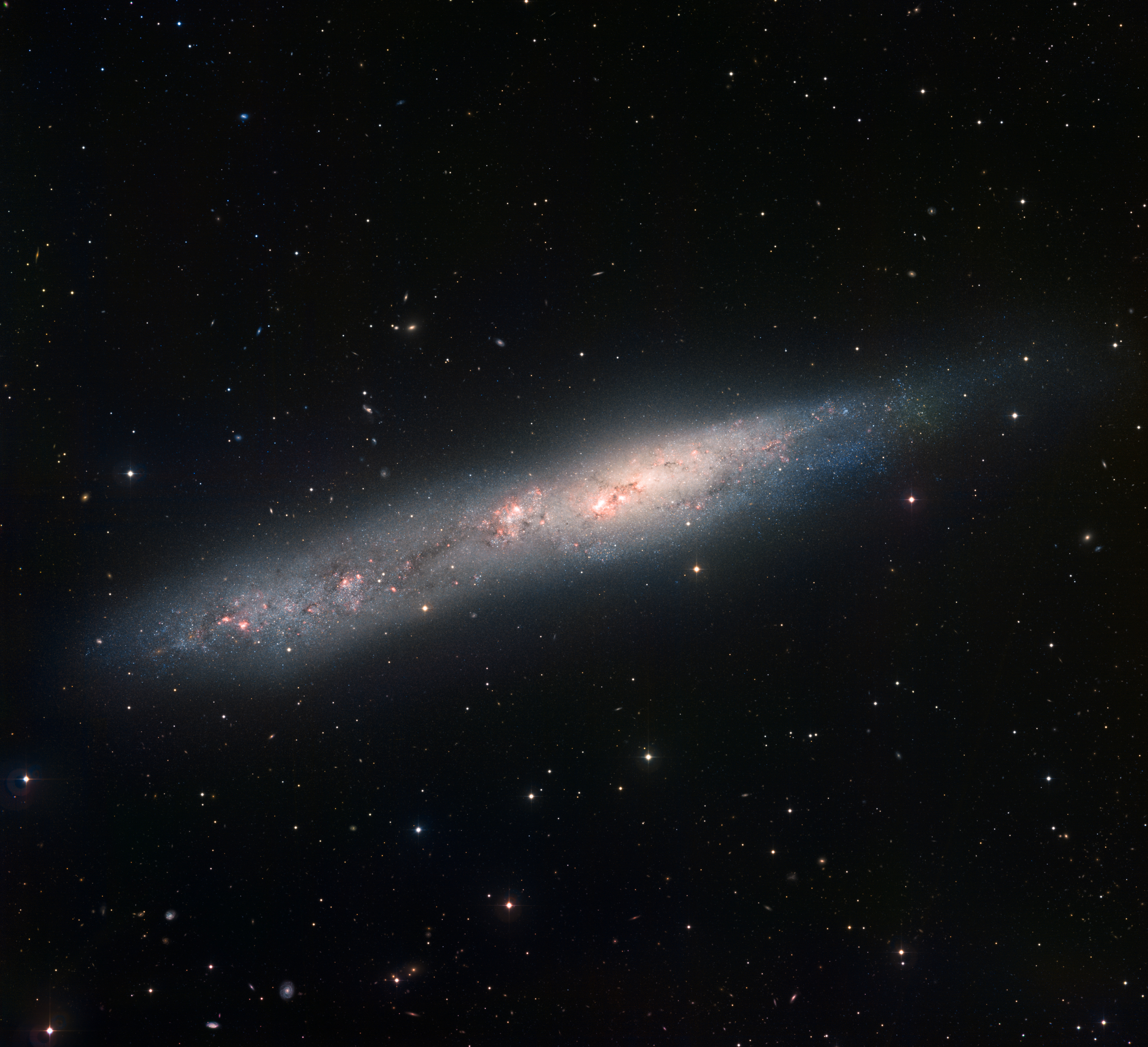
- Magellanic barred spiral galaxy NGC 55 imaged by the La Silla Observatory

Observation data (J2000 epoch)
- Constellation: Sculptor
- Right ascension: 00^{h} 14^{m} 53.6^{s}
- Declination: −39° 11′ 47.9″
- Redshift: 0.000437
- Heliocentric radial velocity: 131 ± 2 km/s
- Distance: 6.5 ± 0.65 Mly (2.00 ± 0.2 Mpc) ^{[a]}
- Apparent magnitude (V): 7.87

Characteristics
- Type: SB(s)m
- Mass: (2.0 ± 0.4) × 10^{10} M_{☉}
- Size: ~68,500 ly (20.99 kpc) (estimated)
- Apparent size (V): 32.4′ × 5.6′

Other designations
- PGC 1014, Caldwell 72, 2MASS J00145360-3911478, IRAS F00124-3929, ESO 293-50, MCG -07-01-013

NGC 55, also known as the String of Pearls Galaxy, is a Magellanic type barred spiral galaxy located about 6.5 million light-years away in the constellation Sculptor. It was discovered on 7 July 1826 by Scottish astronomer James Dunlop. Along with its neighbor NGC 300, it is one of the closest galaxies to the Local Group, probably lying between the Milky Way and the Sculptor Group. It has an estimated mass of (2.0 ± 0.4) × 10^{10} M_{☉}.

== Nearby galaxies and group information ==
NGC 55 and the spiral galaxy NGC 300 have traditionally been identified as members of the Sculptor Group or LGG 4, a nearby group of galaxies in the constellation of the same name. However, recent distance measurements indicate that the two galaxies actually lie in the foreground.

It is likely that NGC 55 and NGC 300 form a gravitationally bound pair.

== Visual appearance ==
The Webb Society Deep-Sky Observer's Handbook writes the following about NGC 55: "Nearly edge-on and appears asymmetrical with some signs of dust near the bulge, which is diffuse, broad and somewhat elongated with the south edge sharp; southeast of the bulge it is strongly curved and lined with 4 or 5 faint knots; north edge of the curve is sharp." Burnham calls it "one of the outstanding galaxies of the southern heavens", somewhat resembling a smaller version of the Large Magellanic Cloud. In September 1897, the famous New York comet hunter Lewis Swift observed the galaxy from Echo Mountain, California with a 16-inch refractor. He mistook the galaxy's faint eastern section as a new find (even though John Herschel had drawn it) and that is how it got cataloged as IC 1537.

== See also ==
- NGC 4236
- NGC 4631
- List of NGC objects
- List of NGC objects (1-1000)

== Notes ==
1. average(6.9 ± 0.7, 7.5 ± 1.1) = ((6.9 + 7.5) / 2) ± ((0.7^{2} + 1.1^{2})^{0.5} / 2) = 7.2 ± 0.7
