= NGC 5238 =

Galaxy in constellation Canes Venatici

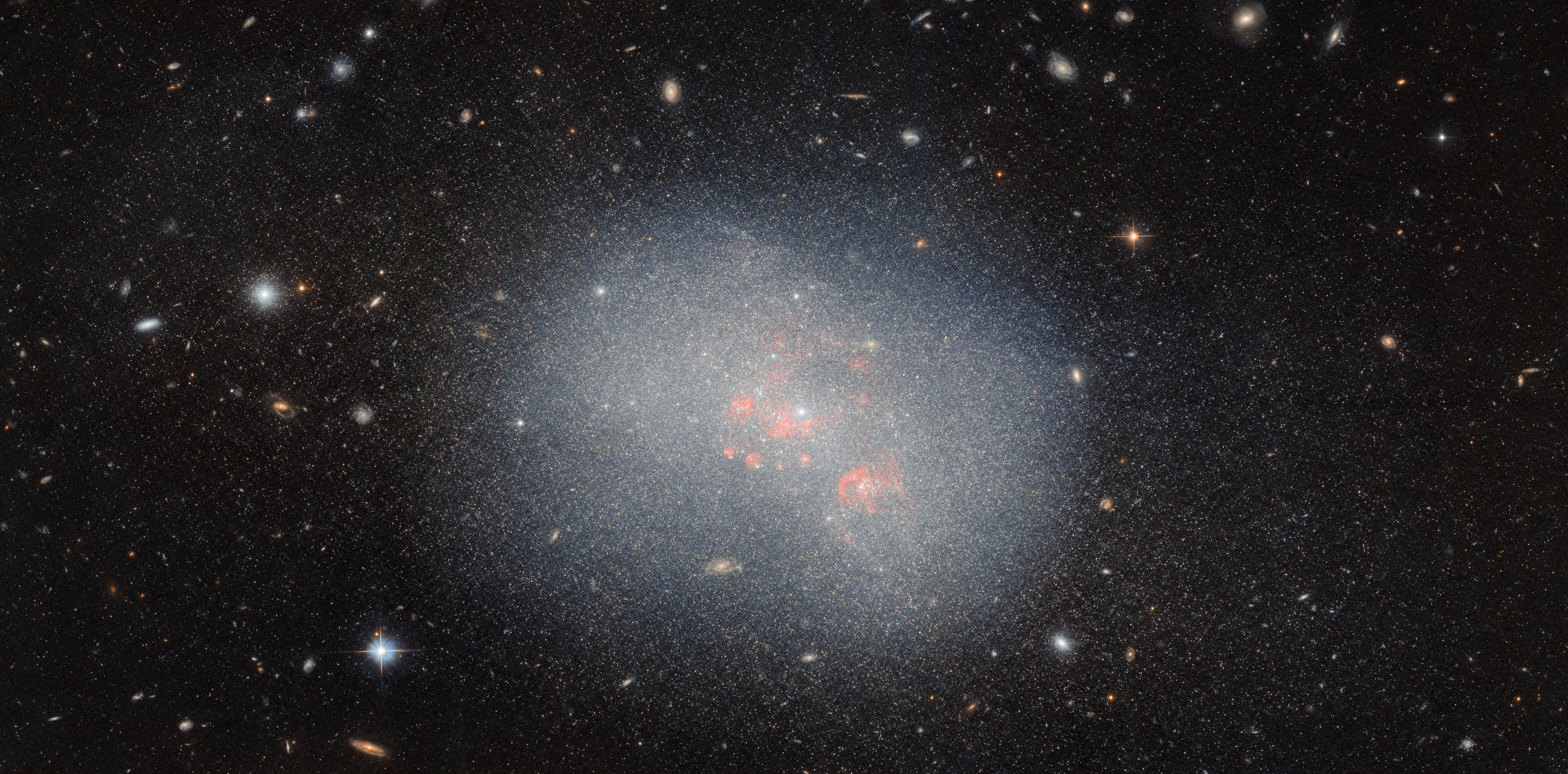
- Hubble Space Telescope image of NGC 5238

Observation data (J2000 epoch)
- Constellation: Canes Venatici
- Right ascension: 13^{h} 34^{m} 43.8^{s}
- Declination: +51° 36′ 33″
- Redshift: 0.0015
- Heliocentric radial velocity: 229 km/s
- Distance: 4.51 Mpc

Characteristics
- Type: Irr
- Mass: 1.17×10^{6} M_{☉}
- Mass/Light ratio: 0.6 M_{☉}/L_{☉}
- Apparent size (V): 64.4"

Other designations
- UGC 8565, VV 828, Mrk 1479, SBS 1332+518, I Zw 64, KPG 384

NGC 5238 is an irregular galaxy in the constellation Canes Venatici. Located at a comoving distance of 4.51 Mpc, it is 64.4 arcseconds in diameter. It has sometimes been classified as a blue compact dwarf galaxy. Although some authors have hypothesized it to be a member of the M101 Group of galaxies, it is currently believed to be an isolated galaxy.

At an inclination of 39° with respect to Earth, NGC 5238 has a total mass of 117 million solar masses, with a star formation rate of 0.01 solar masses per year. Of the total mass, HI gas appears to account for 26 million solar masses.

== Classification ==
In 1977, NGC 5238 was hypothesized to not be a single galaxy, but rather a pair of interacting galaxies. It was not until ten years later that a dedicated study of the galaxy's rotation curve was undertaken, showing that the galaxy is indeed a single galaxy. One of the two regions that was thought to be the nucleus of a galaxy was instead shown to be simply a large HII region around 100 pc in diameter.

The morphological type of NGC 5238 has been the subject of some controversy. In 1979, the galaxy was classified as a barred spiral galaxy. Soon after, in 1984, the galaxy was included in a study of blue compact dwarf galaxies, incompatible with the classification of a barred spiral. However, the barred spiral classification was considered the correct classification for years. It was not until the mid 1990s that the galaxy was first recognized as a dwarf irregular galaxy. Even after this, the majority of studies recognized the galaxy as a spiral galaxy until 2015, when the classification of irregular finally became widely accepted.

== Appearance ==
From Earth, NGC 5238 is tilted at an inclination of 39°. This 2013 estimate follows previous estimates of 30° in 1987, 37 ± 5° in 1992, and 47° in 1999 In the Spitzer 3.6 μm band, the semimajor axis of its angular size is 64.4", with an ellipticity of 0.201.

NGC 5238 has two stellar streams: one umbrella-shaped one to its north, and another sparser overdensity of stars to its south.

=== Distance ===
The distance estimate to NGC 5238 has been brought down considerably since first calculated. The first published distance estimate was 7 Mpc, derived using redshift. This remained the predominant estimate until 1996, when the distance was found to be much less, estimated at 5.18 Mpc. Subsequently, using spectral data from the HI 21cm line, the distance was calculated to be 4.7 Mpc in 1999, although an updated HI study found a slightly higher value at 5.20 Mpc in 2002. Five years later, in 2007, the distance estimate was lowered even further to 4.50 Mpc, extremely close to today's accepted value.

One way to determine distance unambiguously is by standard candles. The tip of the red giant branch is such a method; every galaxy's brightest red giant stars must have exactly the same known luminosity. When combined with corrections for interstellar reddening, this allows for accurate determination of a galaxy's distance. By 2009, a Hubble Space Telescope image of NGC 5238 had become available, resolving the individual stars within the galaxy. Using this method, the distance modulus was calculated at 28.27 magnitudes, corresponding to a distance of 4.51 Mpc, today's accepted value.

== Radio emission ==
Since a first study was published in 1986, the neutral hydrogen gas of NGC 5238 and its associated 21 cm line have been the subject of many studies. The first study calculated the total HI 21 cm flux from the galaxy to be 4.5 ± 1.0 Jy·km/s, with a full width at half maximum of 28 km/s and a maximum flux density of 0.25 ± 0.011 Jy. Two years later, the 20% line width was calculated at two conflicting values from two studies: 47 km/s and 65 km/s. From the HI line data, the total mass to HI mass ratio was calculated to be 0.384 and the pseudo HI surface density was estimated to be 9.7 solar masses per square parsec. Another two years later, another estimate for the 20% and 50% line widths was published, calculating 36 ± 4 km/s at 50% and 49 ± 4 at 20%.

In 1999, the 50% line width was further refined to 32 ± 4 km/s, then 36 km/s. The second study, in addition to deriving the 5.20 Mpc distance quoted above, found a total HI mass of 4.2×10^{7} solar masses. Finally, in 2013, the 50% line width estimate was further increased to 40 km/s, and the HI mass was refined to 2.6×10^{7} solar masses, implying a total-to-HI mass ratio of 7.3.

In addition to HI gas, it is thought that radio continuum emission should be present from NGC 5238 as well. The galaxy is a strong ultraviolet emitter, indicating that the galaxy is undergoing rapid star formation. Based on this, it is to be expected that there should be radio continuum emission from the galaxy, due to the acceleration of electrons in HII regions, known as bremsstrahlung. However, such emission has not been found in NGC 5238, contradicting models. To resolve this mystery, it has been hypothesized that the star formation has subsided recently enough that the UV excess from massive stars is still present, but the hydrogen has already recombined.

== Image gallery ==
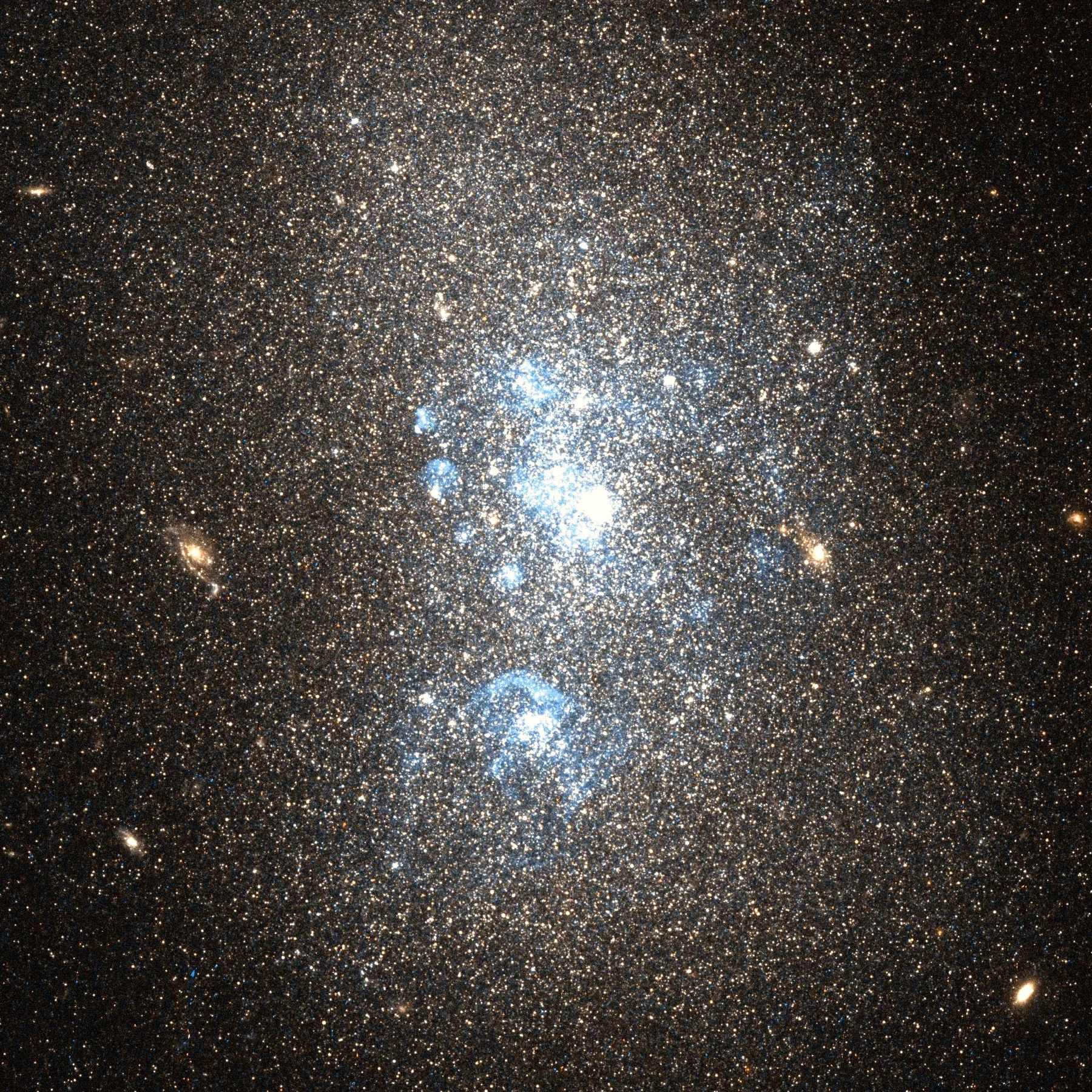
Hubble Space Telescope image of NGC 5238.
