= SN 2011fe =

Supernova in the Pinwheel Galaxy

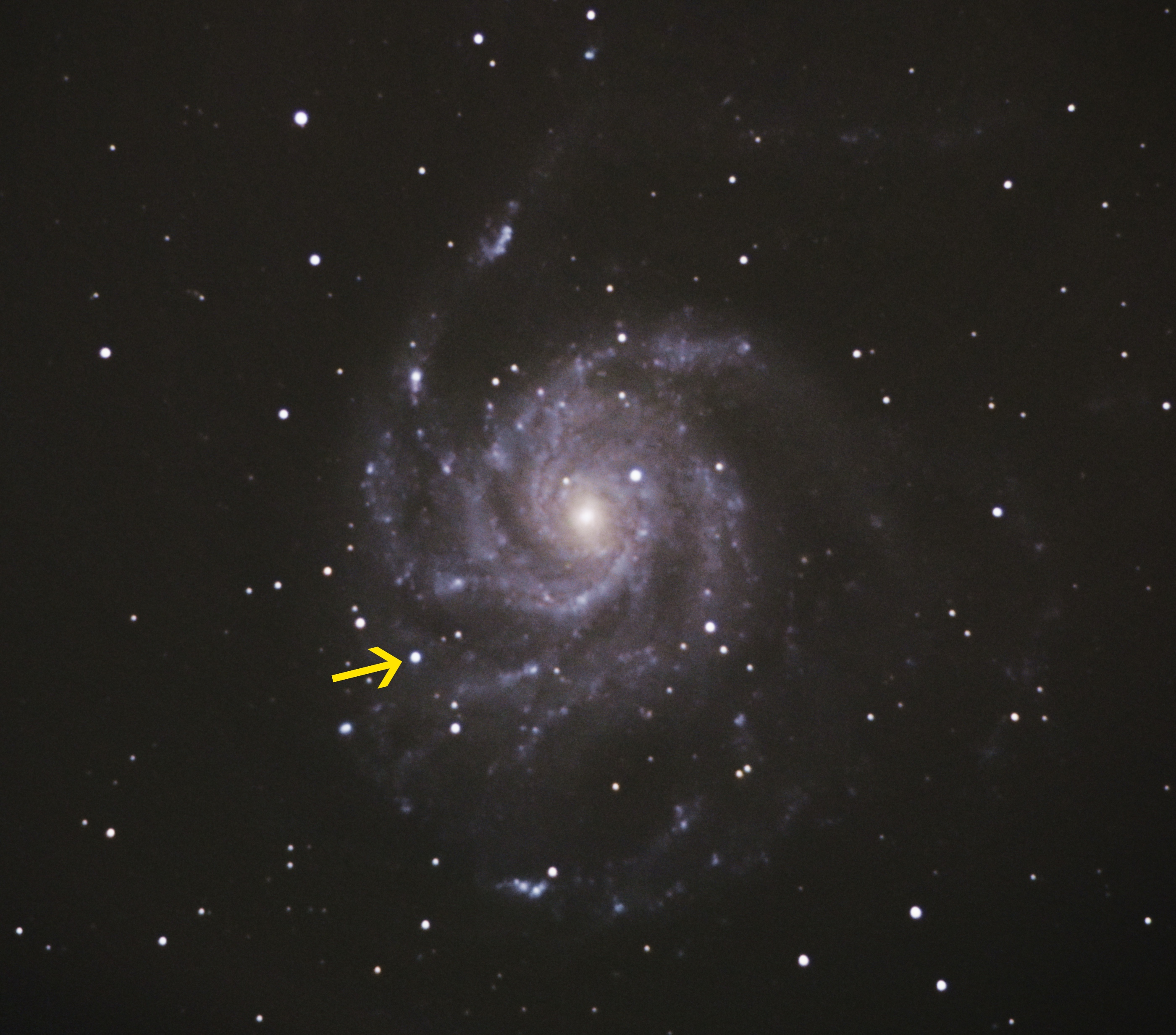
- Supernova event on August 25, 2011
- Event type: Supernova
- Ia
- Date: 24 August 2011
- Constellation: Ursa Major
- Right ascension: 14^{h} 03^{m} 05.8^{s}
- Declination: +54° 16′ 25″
- Epoch: J2000
- Distance: 21 Mly
- Redshift: 0.001208 ±5e-06
- Host: Pinwheel Galaxy (M101)
- Peak apparent magnitude: 9.9
- Other designations: SN 2011fe
- Related media on Commons

SN 2011fe, initially designated PTF 11kly, was a Type Ia supernova discovered by the Palomar Transient Factory (PTF) survey on 24 August 2011 during an automated review of images of the Messier 101 from the nights of 22 and 23 August 2011. It was located in Messier 101, the Pinwheel Galaxy, 21 million light years from Earth. It was observed by the PTF survey very near the beginning of its supernova event, when it was approximately 1 million times too dim to be visible to the naked eye. It is the youngest Type Ia ever discovered. About 13 September 2011, it reached its maximum brightness of apparent magnitude +9.9 which equals an absolute magnitude of about -19, equal to 2.5 billion Suns. At +10 apparent magnitude around 5 September, SN 2011fe was visible in small telescopes. As of 30 September the supernova was at +11 apparent magnitude in the early evening sky after sunset above the northwest horizon. It had dropped to +13.7 as of 26 November 2011.

== Discovery ==
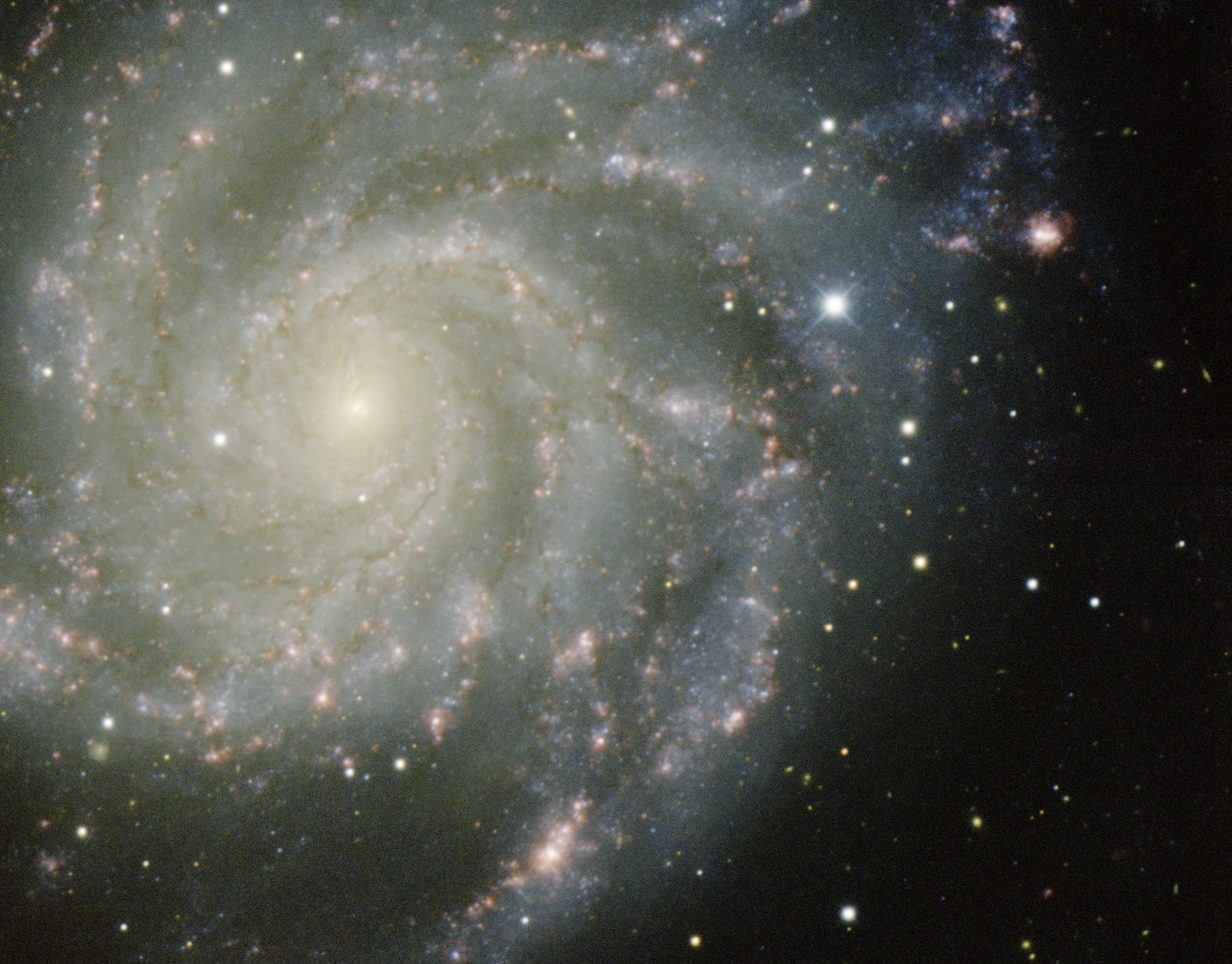
SN 2011fe is visible as the bright, blue star just above and to the right of center.

The Palomar Transient Factory is an automated telescopic survey that scans the sky for transient and variable astronomical events. Information is fed to the National Energy Research Scientific Computing Center (NERSC) at Lawrence Berkeley National Lab, which computes the information to identify new star events. After the initial observation of the SN 2011fe event, telescopes were used in the Canary Islands (Spain) to identify the emission spectrum of light emitted at various stages of the event. Following this, the Hubble Space Telescope, the Lick Observatory in California, and the Keck Observatory in Hawaii were used to observe the event in greater detail.

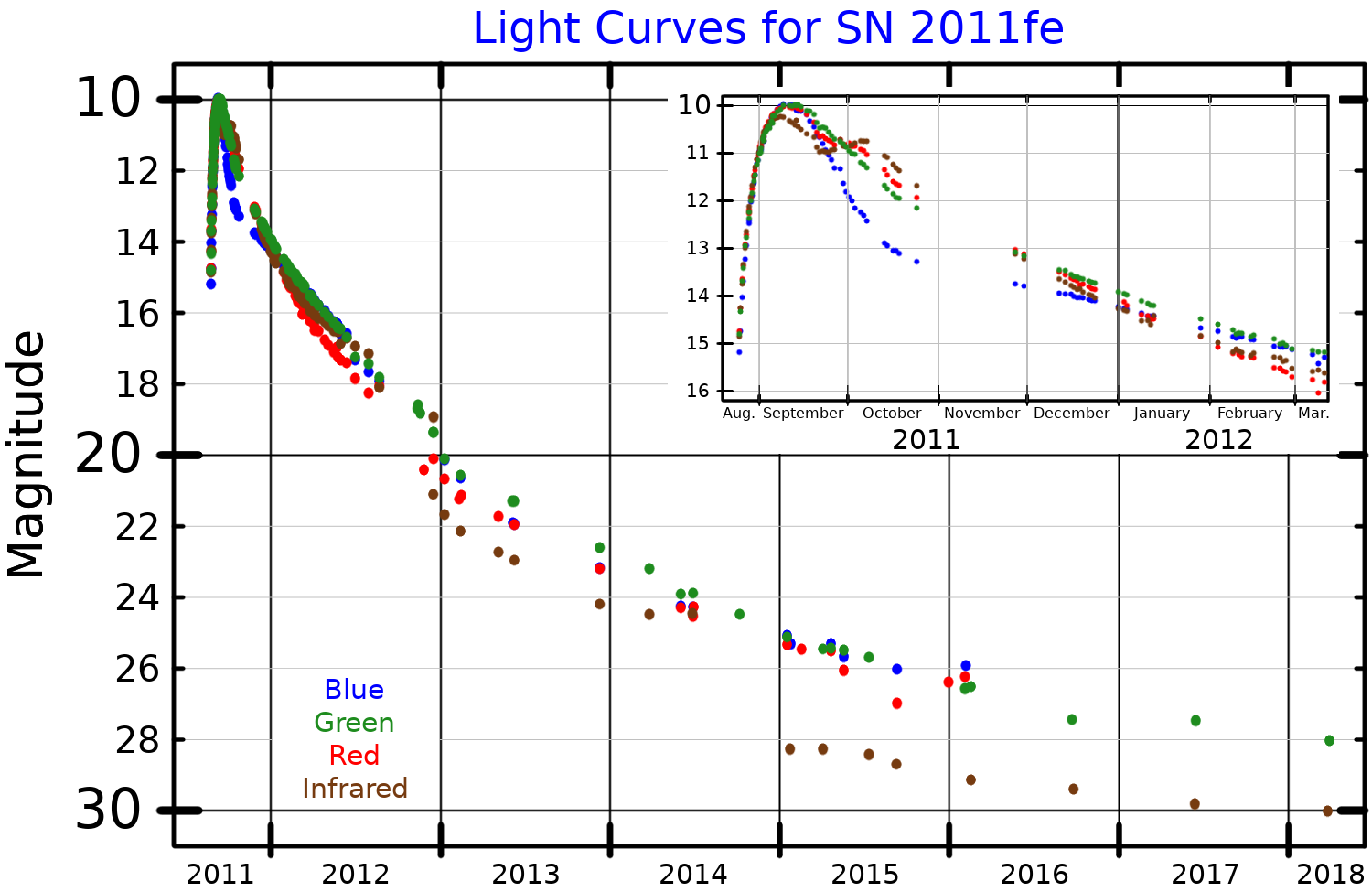
Light curves for SN 2011fe in four photometric bands. The inset plot shows the time around peak brightness with an expanded scale. Adapted from Zhang et al. (2016) and Tucker et al. (2022)

Although SN 2011fe was initially very faint, it brightened rapidly. On the day it was first imaged, 24 August 2011, it was 1 million times too dim to be visible to the unaided eye. One day later, it was 10 thousand times too dim. The next day it was 6 times brighter than that. On 25 August, the EVLA radio telescope failed to detect radio emissions from SN 2011fe. While such emissions are common for other types of supernovae, they have never been observed for Type Ia's.

Two possible candidates were proposed for the precursor system; however, subsequent analysis appears to rule them out.

== Importance of Type Ia supernovae and SN 2011fe ==
Type Ia supernova events occur when a white dwarf star accretes enough additional matter to exceed the Chandrasekhar limit and collapses, triggering runaway fusion and a supernova explosion. Because this collapse happens at a consistent mass, the resulting explosions have very uniform characteristics, and are used as "standard candles" to measure the distance to their host galaxies. The exact brightness and behavior of a Type Ia supernova depends on the metallicity of its parent star (the fraction of the star composed of elements heavier than hydrogen and helium before its evolution into a white dwarf). Because the SN 2011fe event was detected so early, astronomers can gain a more accurate measurement of its initial composition and of its evolution during the supernova explosion, and so refine their models of Type Ia supernova events, resulting in more precise distance estimates for other Type Ia supernova observations.^{1}

Type Ia supernova standard candles may help provide evidence to support the hypothesis of dark energy and the accelerating expansion of the universe. A better understanding of Type Ia supernova behavior may in turn allow theoretical models of dark energy to be improved.
