= NGC 5204 =

Galaxy in the constellation Ursa Major

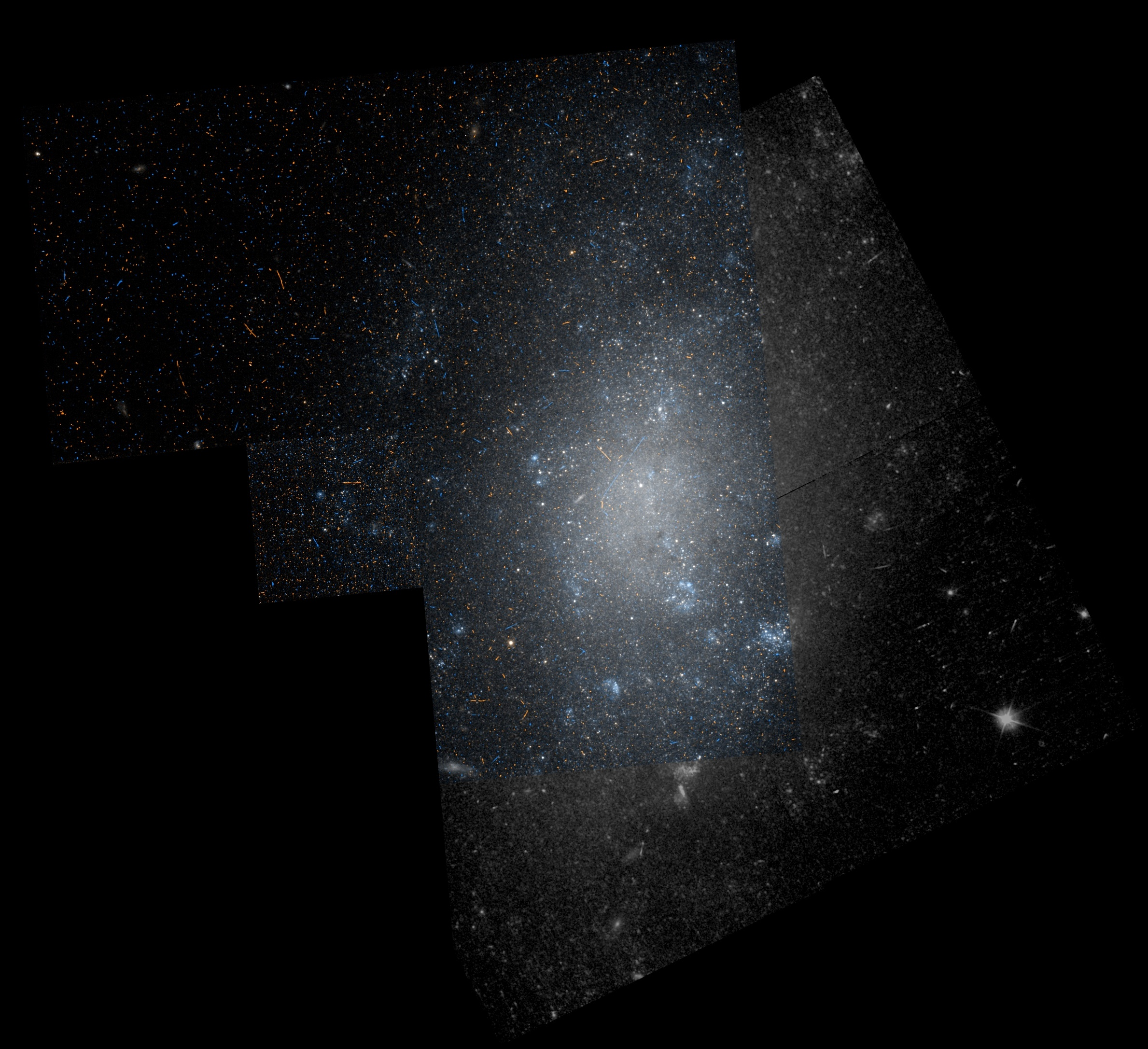
- NGC 5204 (Hubble Space Telescope)

Observation data (J2000 epoch)
- Constellation: Ursa Major
- Right ascension: 13^{h} 29^{m} 36.5^{s}
- Declination: +58° 25′ 07″
- Redshift: +201 km/s
- Distance: 4.3-4.8 Mpc (14-14.5 million ly)
- Apparent magnitude (V): 11.73

Characteristics
- Type: SA(s)m
- Apparent size (V): 5.0′ × 3.0'

Other designations
- UGC 8490, PGC 47368, ZWG 294.39

NCG 5204 is a Magellanic spiral galaxy located about 14.5 million light-years away from Earth (Note: The distance from Earth is 14.5 million light-years or 8.5×10^{19} miles or 1.37×10^{20} kilometres.) in the constellation of Ursa Major and is a member of the M101 Group of galaxies. It has a galaxy morphological classification of SA(s)m and is highly irregular, with only the barest indication of any spiral arm structure. The galaxy's most prominent feature is an extremely powerful X-ray source designated NGC 5204 X-1. This has resulted in the galaxy being the target of several studies due to the strength of the source and its relative proximity to Earth.

== Structure ==
With a diameter of approximately 6,000 parsecs (19,000 light-years) across its long axis, NGC 5204 is intermediate between smaller dwarf galaxies and larger, more prominent spiral galaxies such as Andromeda. While the galaxy's overall organization is irregular, there is a somewhat indistinct spiral arm structure at one end of the main disc. The presence of this feature has resulted in it being classified as type SA(s)m, also known as a Magellanic spiral, after the Large Magellanic Cloud (LMC), the best known example of this rare type of galaxy. Although its diameter is smaller than the LMC, NGC 5204 has a much more diffuse distribution of stars and its mass of around 8 × 10^{8} M_{☉} is only about 10% of the LMC or 0.1% of the Milky Way. Its luminosity is about 6 × 10^{8} L_{☉}.

Like most irregular galaxies, NGC 5204 is relatively rich in gas and dust, although it lacks any prominent nebulas or broad areas of vigorous star formation. Despite its relatively diffuse distribution of stars, the galaxy does have several clusters of hot, young stars that are thought to be the location of most of the eleven known X-ray sources. The galaxy also appears to have a larger than normal dark matter component as the estimated mass of its visible portion does not adequately explain the observed rotation curve of the individual stars, even very close to its center. Although most spiral galaxies exhibit a rotation curve discrepancy, this normally does not become apparent until much farther away from the nucleus.

No supernovas have been observed in the galaxy to date, although three supernova remnants have been identified. A 1997 paper estimated that the galaxy probably has about one supernova every 2000 years.

NGC 5204 has usually been classified as a member of the M101 Group of galaxies, but it is not known to have any close companions.

== X-ray source ==
The galaxy's most noticeable feature is a very powerful ultraluminous X-ray source (ULX) discovered in the early 1980s by the Einstein Observatory and designated NGC 5204 X-1. It is located at 13^{h} 29^{m} 38.62^{s} +58° 25′ 05.6″ and has a luminosity of around 5.2 × 10^{39} erg/s (5.2 × 10^{32} Watts). While this is far too powerful to be generated by the accretion disc of a stellar-mass black hole, the source's location at a displacement of around 15 arcseconds from the center of the galaxy also means that it cannot be powered by an active galactic nucleus. Since its discovery, NGC 5204 X-1 has been the target of several studies to try to determine the precise mechanism that is responsible for generating this and other known ULXs. The more recent of these studies were able to make use of the high-resolution capabilities of the Chandra X-ray Observatory to study the source in detail and firmly rule out the possibility that its unusual luminosity is the result of several weaker, but closely spaced sources.

The most common proposal for the progenitor of NGC 5204 X-1 is an intermediate-mass black hole with a mass of about 100-100,000 M_{☉} with a giant companion star that is losing mass to the black hole, similar to other X-ray binary systems, but much larger in scale. This theory is supported by the fact that the Eddington limit for a source of this magnitude means that the mass of generating object cannot be less than 25 M_{☉}. The source's observed strength has varied by up to 50% over a 10-year span, which is also consistent with an accretion disc X-ray source.

=== Optical counterpart ===
An optical counterpart to NGC 5204 X-1 was discovered in 2001 using the X-ray data from Chandra and a series of observations in the visible spectrum from the Hubble Space Telescope. With an apparent magnitude of 19.7 despite a distance of more than 14 million light-years, which corresponds to an absolute magnitude of -8.7, it is most likely a large type B or type O supergiant star. A 2003 study that performed a detailed spectral analysis of the optical source determined that its surface temperature is most likely less than 25,000 K. If accurate, this would suggest that the counterpart is a type B0 supergiant with a mass of about 25 M_{☉} and a radius of about 30 R_{☉}, similar to Deneb.

Both the X-ray source and the optical counterpart are located near the center of a massive void in the surrounding interstellar medium more than 150 parsecs (490 light-years) wide. This is probably a result of the extremely powerful solar wind that is generated by stars of this luminosity.

The discovery of this massive star also cast some doubt on the prevailing theory that the ULX is generated by a black hole accretion disc. A calculation of the orbits of a binary system with the components detailed above suggests an orbital period of 200–300 hours, depending on the exact masses involved. However, a 2006 study found no evidence of any periodic variations at all in the luminosity of the X-ray source, although the strength does vary randomly over timescales of a few days. As a result, the study advanced an alternative theory that the X-ray source is generated by the supergiant's corona, which would be capable of generating a very powerful X-ray source because of the extreme luminosity of the parent star. Supergiant stars are also known to experience large variations in luminosity more or less at random, which would heat the corona to varying degrees and explain the observed changes in X-ray emission strength.

However, it is not known which, if any, of these theories are correct, and the actual source of this and other ultraluminous X-ray sources remains unknown.
