= NGC 5585 =

Galaxy in the constellation Ursa Major

- NGC 5585 (Hubble Space Telescope)

Observation data (J2000 epoch)
- Constellation: Ursa Major
- Right ascension: 14^{h} 19^{m} 48.2^{s}
- Declination: +56° 43′ 45″
- Redshift: +293 km/s (182 mi/s)
- Heliocentric radial velocity: 303 +/- 1 km/s
- Distance: 5.7–8.6 Mpc (18.6–28.0 Mly)
- Apparent magnitude (V): 11.2

Characteristics
- Type: SAB(s)d
- Size: ~43,000 ly (13.08 kpc) (estimated)
- Apparent size (V): 5.8′ × 3.7'

Other designations
- IRAS 14182+5657, 2MASX J14194820+5643445, UGC 9179, MCG +10-20-094, PGC 51210, CGCG 295-045

NGC 5585 is a spiral galaxy located about 28 million light-years away from Earth in the constellation of Ursa Major; it is a member of the M101 Group of galaxies. The galaxy has a diameter of about 43,000 light-years and has a very diffuse disc with almost no central bulge. Although its overall structure is quite complex, the galaxy does have a very faint spiral arm structure which has resulted in it receiving a galaxy morphological classification of SAB(s)d.

Like other galaxies with a similar type, NGC 5585 exhibits a moderate level of star formation that is mostly concentrated in the central region. To date, 47 distinct regions of star formation have been identified. Despite this, the galaxy's visible components appear to form only a tiny fraction of the total mass present as the gravity of the visible portion of the disc does not explain the observed rotation curve even extremely close to the center. This suggests that NGC 5585 has a very large dark matter component that is more reflective of what is normally seen in dwarf galaxies than a galaxy of this size. Even the gravity of the galaxy's H I regions appears to have more impact than the visible components of the galaxy.

A total of five supernova remnants (SNRs) have been observed in NGC 5585. One of the SNRs is extremely large with dimensions of about 200 x 90 parsecs (650 x 300 ly) and its x-ray emissions are so powerful that it actually distorted the initial x-ray emission contour map for the entire galaxy that was obtained by the Einstein Observatory in the early 1980s. The SNR's large size and the fact that it is still expanding at an abnormally high rate of more than 85 km/s (53 mi/s) suggest that it is probably located in a low-density area of NGC 5585's interstellar medium.

A 1997 paper estimated that the galaxy probably has about one supernova every 1,000 years.

== Gallery ==
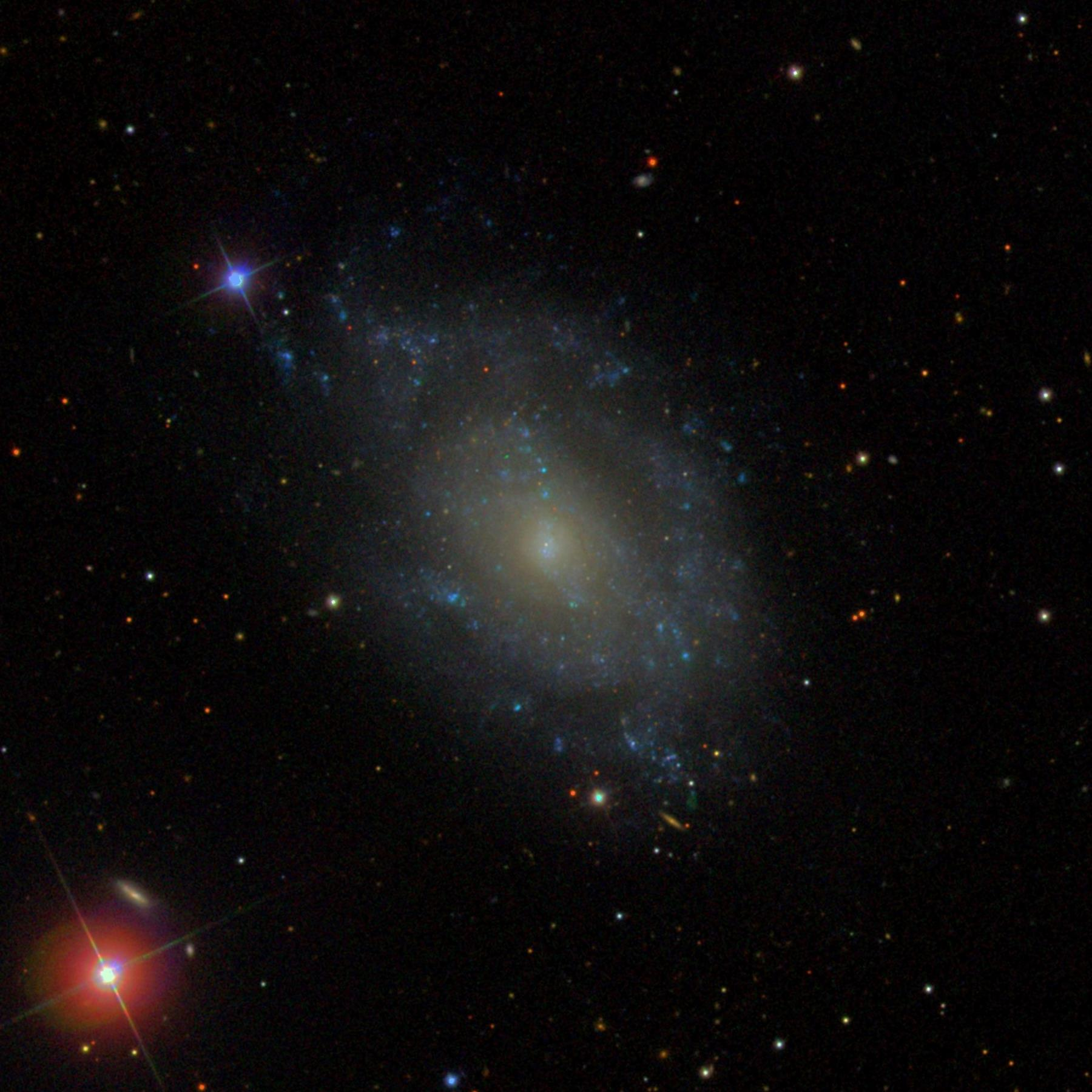
NGC 5585 by the Sloan Digital Sky Survey

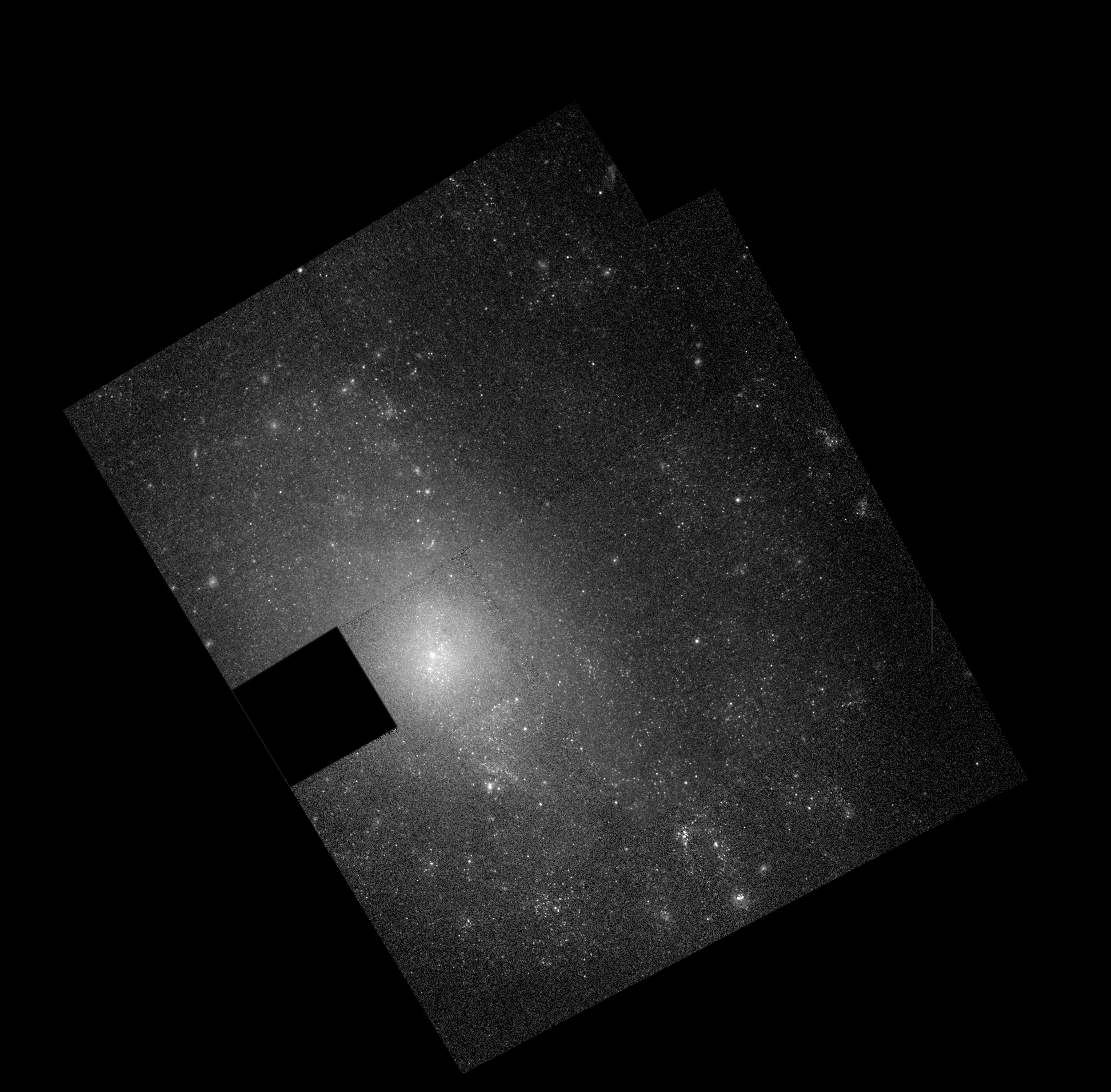
Hubble Space Telescope image of NGC 5585
