= NGC 5474 =

Galaxy in the constellation Ursa Major

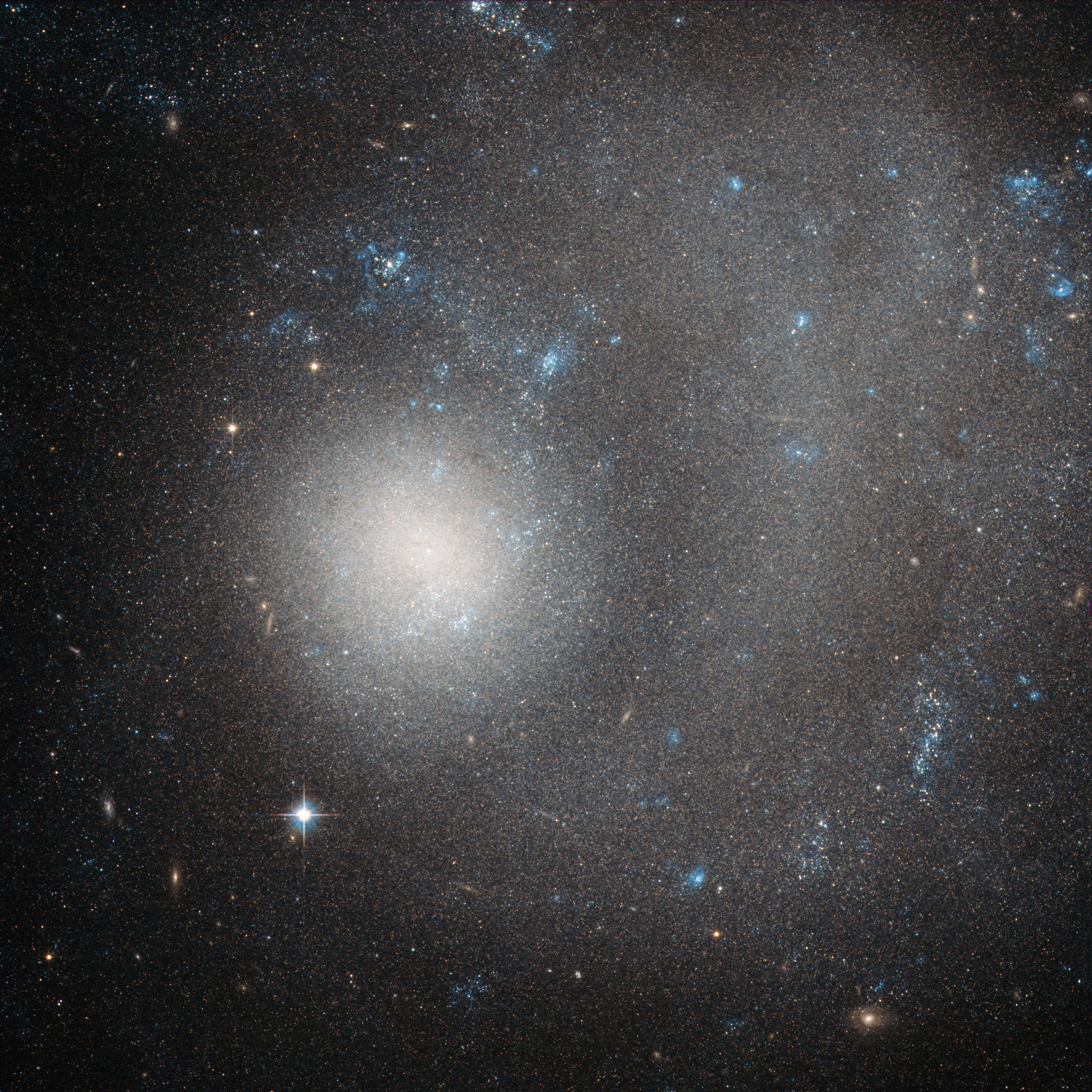
- Hubble image of NGC 5474.

Observation data (J2000 epoch)
- Constellation: Ursa Major
- Right ascension: 14^{h} 05^{m} 01.6^{s}
- Declination: +53° 39′ 44″
- Redshift: 273 ± 9 km/s
- Distance: 21.2 ± 2.2 Mly (6.5 ± 0.7 Mpc)
- Apparent magnitude (V): 11.3

Characteristics
- Type: SA(s)cd pec
- Size: 27,500 ly (8.43 kpc) (estimated)
- Apparent size (V): 4.8′ × 4.3′

Other designations
- UGC 9013, PGC 50216

NGC 5474 is a peculiar dwarf spiral galaxy in the M101 group. Located in the constellation Ursa Major approximately 6.98 Mpc away from Earth, it is a satellite companion to the larger Pinwheel Galaxy (M101), a grand-design spiral. NGC 5474 is in a weakly bound orbit, with a projected distance of 90kpc from M101's photometric center, and of the four satellite galaxies in the M101 group, it is M101's closest companion.

A previous interaction with the Pinwheel Galaxy left NGC 5474 strongly distorted, with the disk is offset relative to the nucleus. The star formation in this galaxy (as traced by hydrogen spectral line emission) is also offset from the nucleus. NGC 5474 shows some signs of a spiral structure. As a result, this galaxy is often classified as a dwarf spiral galaxy, a relatively rare group of dwarf galaxies.

== M101 Interaction ==
Approximately 200 Myr ago, NGC 5474 and M101 collided, with NGC 5474 passing through the west side of M101's outer disk and leaving the morphology of both galaxies distorted. The mass ratio between M101 and NGC 5474 is large — M101 being roughly an order of magnitude more massive — meaning the interaction was strongly asymmetric, with NGC 5474 subject to significant tidal forces while M101 itself shows comparatively modest perturbations. NGC 5474 was left significantly distorted; The photometric center of NGC 5474 has been dramatically offset from the kinematic center of the disk, although it still displays a weak, lopsided spiral arm structure. No significant tidal tails are present around either NGC 5474 or M101, which can be explained by a dual retrograde geometry of the interaction.

This configuration is analogous to other well-studied dwarf-dominant pairs in the local universe, such as the Large Magellanic Cloud and Milky Way system, where the lower-mass companion experiences dramatic morphological and star formation consequences.

While the strongest phase of interaction between the galaxies has passed, and the two galaxies are not projected to have another close encounter within the next billion years, the two galaxies remain connected gravitationally as well as through a shared gas bridge. Hydrogen line observations reveal an extended neutral hydrogen bridge and asymmetric envelope connecting NGC 5474 to M101. This is consistent with tidal stripping, as the gas stream is oriented in the expected direction of M101's tidal force. Additionally, a lack of high-to-intermediate velocity clouds around the dwarf galaxy suggests that the gas bridge is created by M101 siphoning off gas from NGC 5474.

NGC 5474's morphological change is ongoing. The revolution of its stellar disk is opposite to its orbital revolution, so the distortion may diminish after several galactic rotations. The galaxy is unlikely to completely return to its original form as the spiral arm structure in disk galaxies is dependent on its rotational velocity, a parameter that would have been affected by the retrograde collision.

== Star Formation ==
Star formation rates are generally low for dwarf galaxies, but NGC 5474 is brighter than the conventional dwarf galaxy limit by 1.5 mag. Its irregular spiral structure is also not necessarily a limiter on star formation. Both grand design and flocculent spirals are shown to have similar rates of star formation. Their differences lie in the concentration of star formation: within smaller regions for well-defined arms, or more spread out throughout the stellar disk for discontinuous arms. However, the relative lack of a neutral hydrogen reservoir could have a limiting effect on NGC 5474's star formation rate.

== Morphological Questions ==
There is a possibility that the compact bulge of NGC 5474 is itself a dwarf elliptical companion in a polar orbit around the stellar disk. The gravitational interaction of this type of system could produce the same observed asymmetric spiral arm structure as well as the observed distorted HI distribution. Other supporting arguments for this hypothesis include mismatched star formation rate peaks between the bulge and the disk, as well as a relative velocity difference.

== See also ==
- Peculiar galaxy
- Dwarf galaxy
- Interacting Galaxy
- Galaxy formation and evolution
- M101 Group
- Ursa Major (constellation)
