= NGC 5477 =

Dwarf galaxy in the constellation Ursa Major

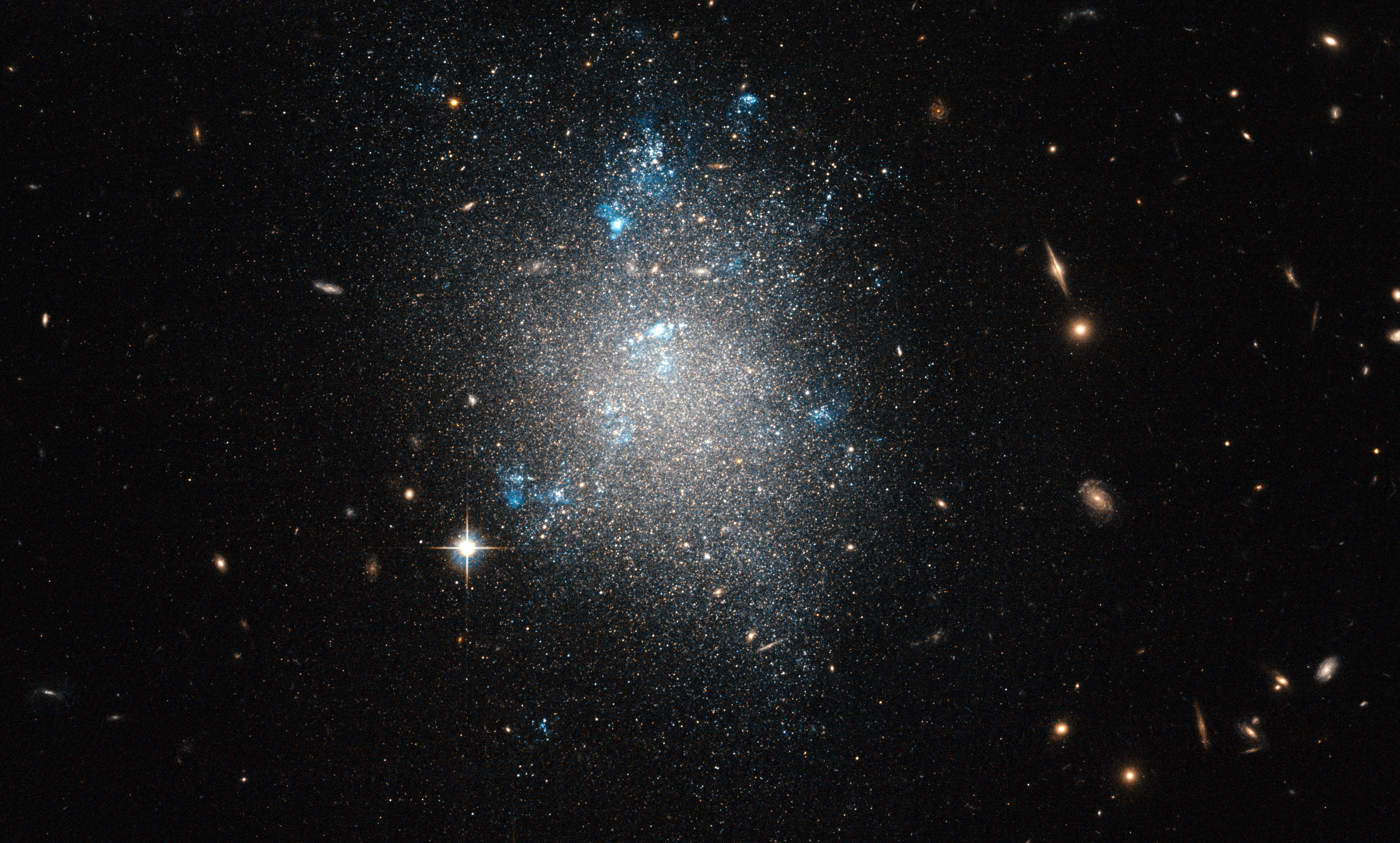
- Dwarf galaxy NGC 5477 taken by the Hubble Space Telescope.

Observation data (J2000 epoch)
- Constellation: Ursa Major
- Right ascension: 14^{h} 05^{m} 33.1^{s}
- Declination: +54° 27′ 40″
- Redshift: 0.001057
- Heliocentric radial velocity: 317 km/s
- Distance: 20 million light years
- Apparent magnitude (V): 14.01

Characteristics
- Type: Sm:

Other designations
- MCG+09-23-034, VV 561, [MI94] Sm 95, DDO 186, SPB 245, Z 272–25 [VDD93] 194, IRAS F14038+5441, TC 305, Z 1403.8+5442, KUG 1403+546, UGC 9018, [HBS84] 74, LEDA 50262, UZC J140532.8+542739, [M98c] 140347.9+544200

NGC 5477 is a dwarf galaxy located in the constellation of Ursa Major, 20 million light years away from Earth. It was discovered on April 14, 1789, by astronomer William Herschel. It has a luminosity class of V and has a large hydrogen line.
