= Kōichi Itagaki =

Japanese entrepreneur and astronomer

Kōichi Itagaki (Japanese: 板垣 公一, Hepburn: Itagaki Kōichi; born 12 November 1947) is an amateur astronomer based in Yamagata, the capital city of Yamagata Prefecture in the Tōhoku region of northern Honshu island, Japan. He is responsible for discovering many comets, and over 170 supernovae.

== Early life ==
Itagaki had an early fascination with lenses, and used them to burn paper with concentrated sunlight.

In 1963, the 19-year-old Japanese amateur Kaoru Ikeya created national headlines when he discovered a comet with his homemade telescope. Itagaki was thus encouraged and bought a 15 centimetres (5.9 in) telescope and, after completing highschool, discovered a comet himself at age 20.

He joined his father's snack food company, Itagaki Peanuts, and rose in the company to be its CEO. At age 60, he retired, handing over the company to his sons.

== Amateur Astronomy ==
Itagaki says he has spent the Yen equivalent of a modest home in his astronomy hobby. Initially, in around 2008, he leased some land just out of Yamagata, in the Zaō Mountains (蔵王連峰, Zaō Renpō) and eventually built four domes for 60 centimetres (24 in), 50 centimetres (20 in), and 11 centimetres (4.3 in) telescopes and a hut for the associated equipment. In 2015, he built an automated telescope site near Okayama, in Okayama Prefecture, Chūgoku region of Honshu, around 700 kilometers to the southwest. In 2018, he built another remotely controlled telescope site on Shikoku island. The three sites allow him to have a variety of observations, and mostly to have one site not obscured by weather on any given night.

One of his main discovery remains SN 2023ixf. As of late-2024, Itagaki's most recent discovery is: SN 2024abfl.

== Recognition ==
Asteroid 1997 UN8 (/List of minor planets: 14001–15000) was named in his honour.

In 2009, he received the Edgar Wilson Award from the International Astronomical Union for the discovery of comet C/2009 E1.

On 22 May 2023, supernova SN 2023ixf in the M101 galaxy, discovered by Itagaki three days previously, was featured on NASA's Astronomy Picture of the Day.

== See also ==
- it:Koichi Itagaki Short biography and lists of discoveries, on Italian Wikipedia
- Kaoru Ikeya
- List of minor planet discoverers
