= NGC 4096 =

Spiral galaxy in the constellation Ursa Major

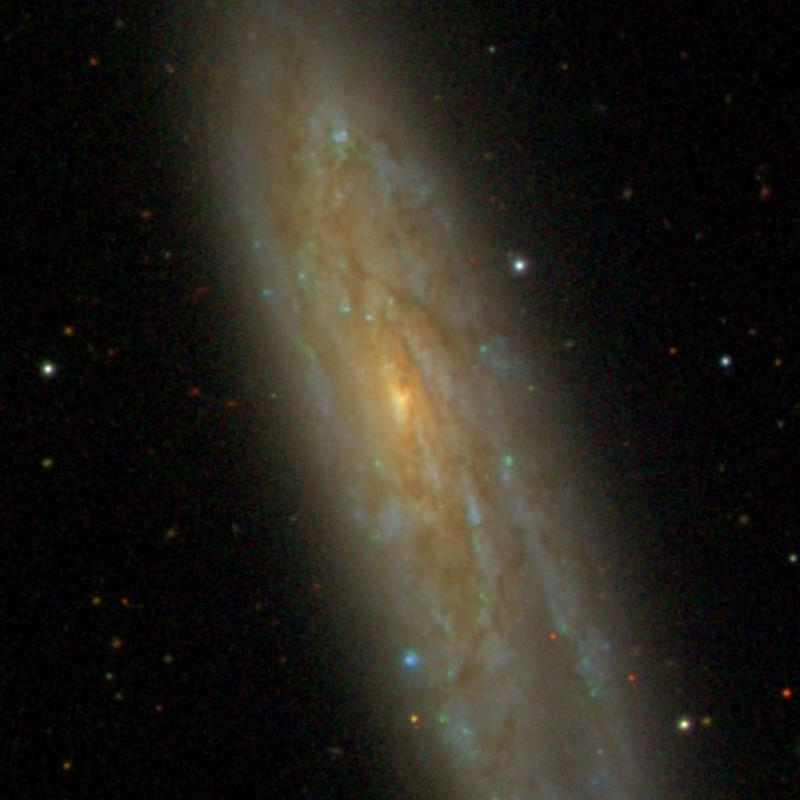
- NGC 4096 by Sloan Digital Sky Survey

Observation data (J2000 epoch)
- Constellation: Ursa Major
- Right ascension: 12^{h} 06^{m} 01.1138^{s}
- Declination: +47° 28′ 42.834″
- Redshift: 0.001908 ± 0.000007
- Heliocentric radial velocity: 572 ± 2 km/s
- Distance: 37.5 ± 7.8 Mly (11.5 ± 2.4 Mpc)
- Apparent magnitude (V): 10.8

Characteristics
- Type: SAB(rs)c
- Apparent size (V): 4.39′ × 1.04′

Other designations
- IRAS 12034+4745, UGC 7090, MCG +08-22-067, PGC 38361, CGCG 243-043

NGC 4096 is a spiral galaxy in the constellation Ursa Major. The galaxy lies about 35 million light years away from Earth, which means, given its apparent dimensions, that NGC 4096 is approximately 80,000 light years across. It was discovered by William Herschel on March 9, 1788.

NGC 4096 is a spiral galaxy visible with an inclination of 76°. Although the presence of a bar has been suggested, it hasn't been proven. The galaxy has multiple well-defined thin arms. NGC 4096 is asymmetric in the north–south axis, with the northern half having stronger CO emissions and asymmetric HI and H-alpha emissions following a lopsided spiral arm. The total stellar mass of the galaxy is estimated to be (6.13±0.1)×10^{9} M_{☉}. The star formation rate of the galaxy is estimated to be between 0.22 and 0.43 M_{☉} per year.

Garcia in 1993 considered the galaxy to be a member of LGG 269 group, along with NGC 4111, NGC 3938, NGC 4051, and NGC 4138. On the other hand, Makarov et al. consider the galaxy to be a member of the Messier 106 Group, along with Messier 106, NGC 4242, NGC 4248, NGC 4288 and NGC 4460. The group is part of the Local Supercluster.

== Supernovae ==
Two supernovae have been detected in NGC 4096.

- SN 1960H (Type Ia-pec, mag. 14) was discovered by Milton Humason on 17 June 1960, and independently by Paul Wild on 20 June 1960.
- SN 2014bi (Type II-P, mag. 18.2) was discovered by the Lick Observatory Supernova Search (LOSS) on 31 May 2014. It was low-luminosity, and the spectrum indicated it was about two weeks post maximum and significantly reddened.
