= IRAS F12032+1707 =

LINER galaxy in the constellation Coma Berenices

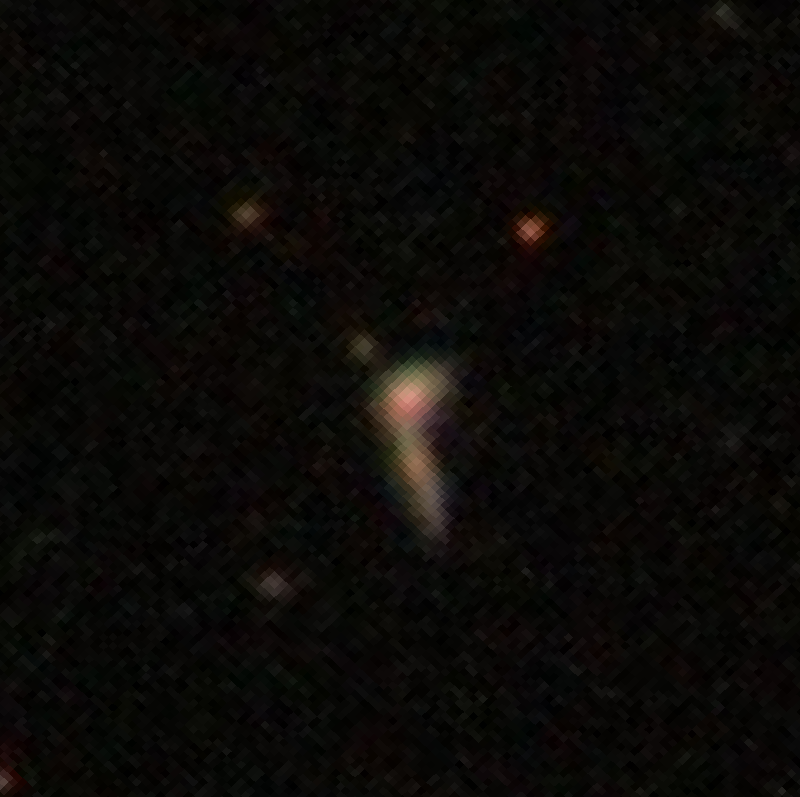
- SDSS image of IRAS F12032+1707.

Observation data (J2000.0 epoch)
- Constellation: Coma Berenices
- Right ascension: 12^{h} 05^{m} 47.71^{s}
- Declination: +16° 51′ 07.95″
- Redshift: 0.217787
- Heliocentric radial velocity: 65,291 km/s ± 48
- Distance: 2.717 Gly
- Apparent magnitude (B): 18.75

Characteristics
- Type: LINER ULIRG
- Size: ~319,000 ly (97.7 kpc) (estimated)

Other designations
- 2MASX J12054771+1651085, LEDA 165592, IRAS 12032+1707, NVSS J120547+165108, IDEOS 04976896_00

IRAS F12032+1707 is a low-ionization nuclear emission-line region (LINER) galaxy located in the constellation of Coma Berenices. The redshift of the galaxy is estimated to be (z) 0.217 and it was first discovered in the IRAS survey in 1998 by astronomers, where the object is classified to be an ultraluminous infrared galaxy (ULRG) with a total infrared luminosity of 12.57 L_{☉}. This galaxy is found to contain an OH megamaser or a gigamaser.

== Description ==
IRAS F12032+1707 is widely known to be the most luminous megamasers detected. Its host galaxy is found to be a part of an interacting pair of galaxies with an estimated separation of 12 kiloparsecs from each other. The estimated R-band magnitude for the host galaxy is -22.22, while the K-band magnitude is -25.79. Radio imaging made by Very Long Baseline Array (VLBA) has found it has continuum flux density of 28.7 mJy. The star formation rate is 641 M_{☉} per year while the total molecular gas mass is 6.7 × 10^{9} M_{☉}.

A study published in 2005, has found a zero-intensive line of the radio emission of IRAS F12032+1707. When observed, the width of the line is estimated to be 2,000 kilometers per seconds, thus making this as the host of the most broadest OH megamaser lines. The H I absorption spectrum of the galaxy is shown as best fitted by two components with measured velocities of around 65,119 and 65,496 kilometers per seconds respectively. Further evidence also suggested most of the megamaser emission originates from the nucleus on the northern side of the galaxy, based on near-infrared and its optical position. Most of the emission is mainly confined to an area measuring 25 x 25 milliarcseconds, with its components positioned roughly north to south and separated.

Evidence also showed the megamaser emission has a tail feature that is highly redshifted, with the flux density estimated to be approximately 9 mJy. The lines detected at both 1,665 and 1,667 GHz frequencies are found mainly undistinguished and blended together. There is a narrow component, depicted having a bright appearance at 64,500 kilometers per seconds with the peak maximum flux density of around 16.3 mJy. A buried active galactic nucleus (AGN) is suggested to lie inside the galaxy with an intrinsic luminosity of 3.5 × 10^{45} erg s^{−1}.
