= SN 1982F =

Supernova in NGC 4490

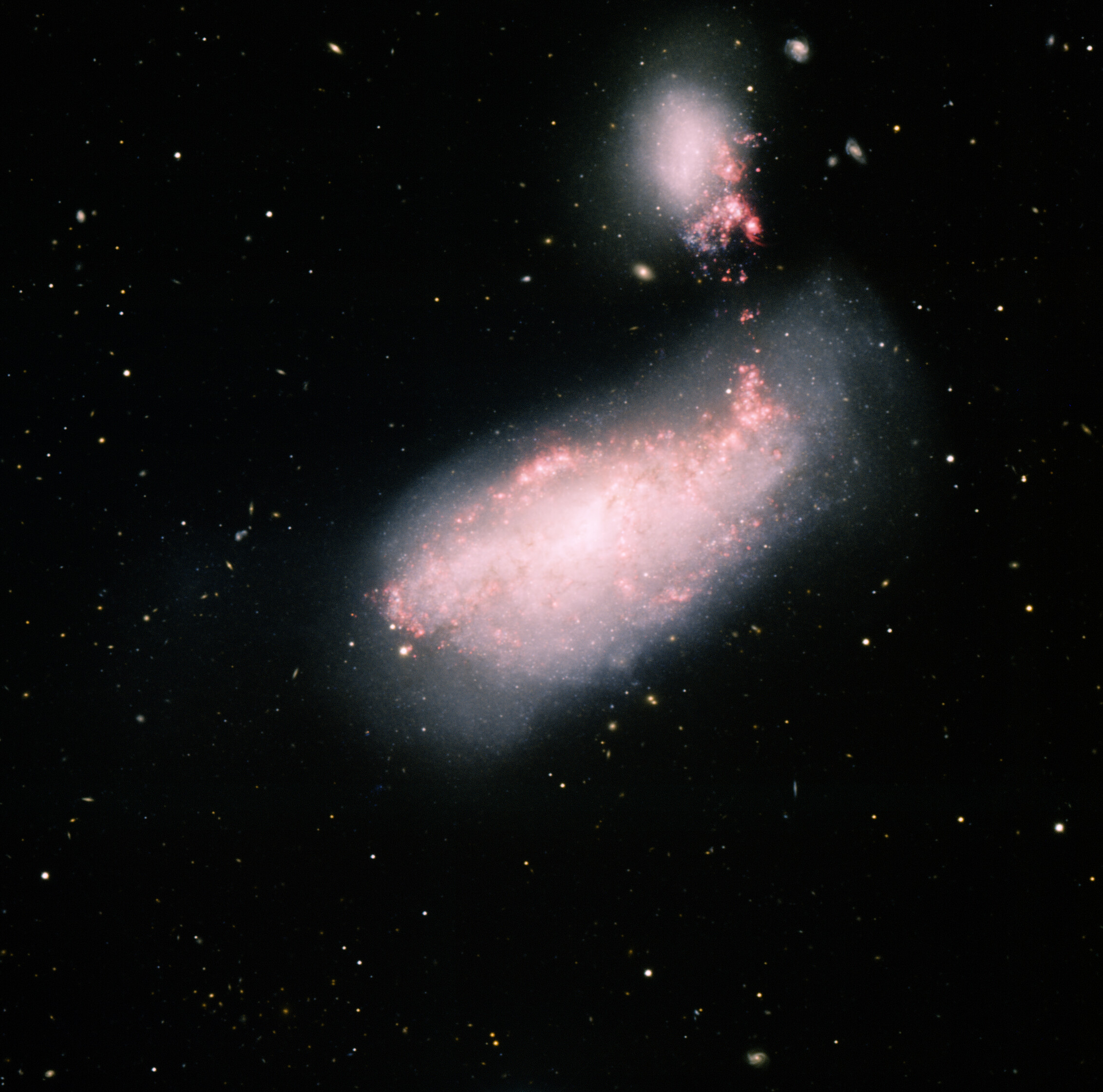
- SN 1982F occurred within the barred spiral galaxy NGC 4490
- Event type: Supernova
- Type ll
- Date: 1982
- Constellation: Canes Venatici
- Right ascension: 12 30 38.00
- Declination: +41 37 60.0
- Galactic coordinates: NGC 4490
- Distance: 24 mly
- Other designations: SN 1982F

SN 1982F was a Type-ll supernova event that occurred in the galaxy NGC 4490, a barred spiral galaxy located around 24 million light years from Earth in the constellation of Canes Venatici.

It occurred near the galactic center of NGC 4490 with another supernova event known as SN 2008ax later occurring nearby.
