= IC 184 =

Galaxy in the constellation Cetus

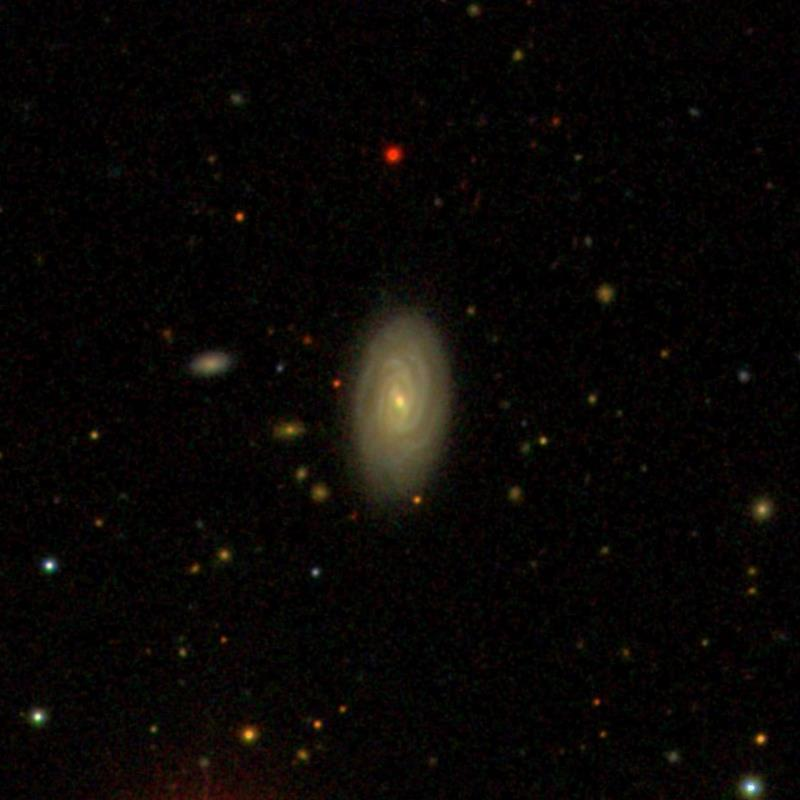
- SDSS image of IC 184

Observation data (J2000 epoch)
- Constellation: Cetus
- Right ascension: 01^{h} 59^{m} 51.25^{s}
- Declination: −06° 50′ 24.36″
- Redshift: 0.017952
- Heliocentric radial velocity: 5,382 km/s ± 26
- Distance: 243 Mly
- Apparent magnitude (V): 13.8

Characteristics
- Type: SB(r)a:;Sy2 HII
- Size: ~93,000 ly (28.4 kpc) (estimated)

Other designations
- 6dF J0159512-065025, 2MASX J01595121-0650253, NSA 130927, PGC 7554, IRAS F01573-0704, MCG -01-06-021

IC 184 is a spiral galaxy located in the constellation of Cetus. The redshift of the galaxy is (z) 0.0179 and it was first discovered by the American astronomer Ormond Stone in October 1887 who gave the description of the object as both faint and small. It has also been classified as a Type 2 Seyfert galaxy.

== Description ==
IC 184 is classified as an early-type spiral galaxy of type SB(r)a based on Calar Alto CCD imaging and is a member of small galaxy group comprising three other galaxies, MCG -01-06-09, MCG -01-06-020 and MCG -01-06-022. When observed, it is shown to have an outer bar feature that is clearly resolved into multiple spiral arms, depicted as having a bright appearance. The central region of the galaxy is found to have isophotal twisting and also the rotation of its position angle (PA). There is a presence of an inner bar that has a region shown as visible as a thick curved elongated feature that begins at the end. The northern spiral arm of the galaxy is found to be much more brighter compared to the southern spiral arm. There are also traces of both inner and outer shell features based on imaging made with Hubble Space Telescope (HST).

Evidence has found IC 184 is an isolated galaxy. When observed, it has a galaxy rotation curve that is orientated along the major axis position angle of 7° and 97°, with the rotation of both the gas and stars being described as decoupled with 4 arcseconds of its own galactic center. A further observation also found the presence of a structure within the innermost region of nine arcseconds, depicted as having a wavy central shape appearance. A water megamaser source has been detected in the galaxy. The luminosity of the megamaser emission is estimated to be 1.0 L_{☉}.
