= IRAS 17208−0014 =

Galaxy in the constellation of Ophiuchus

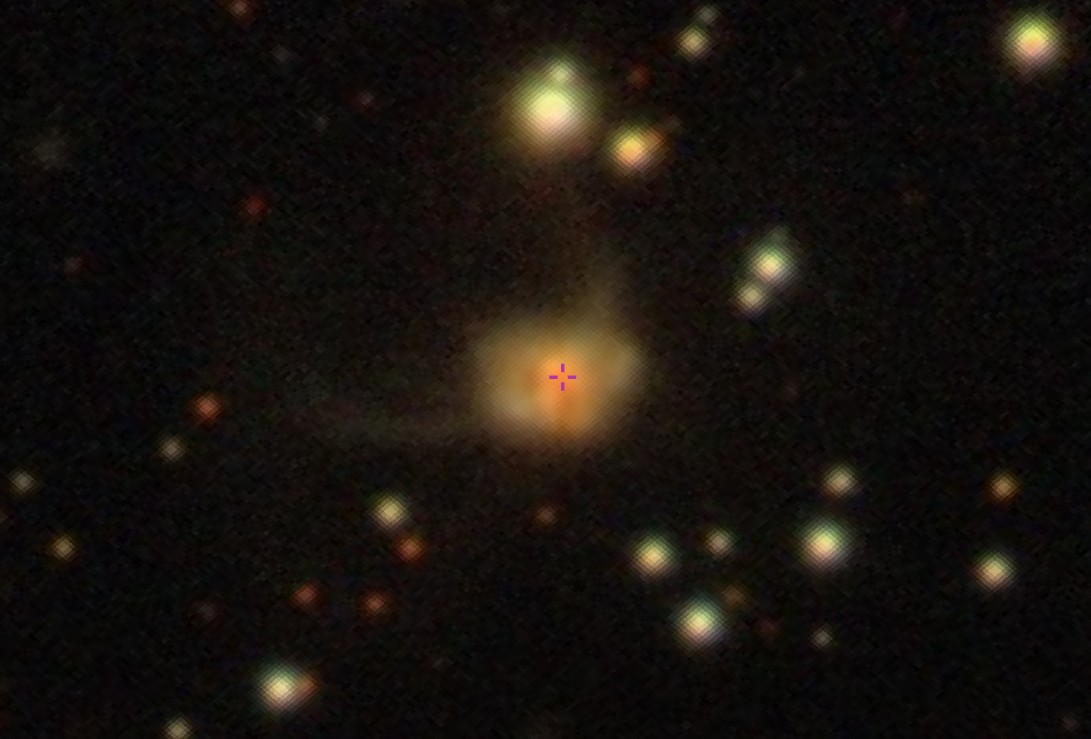
- SDSS image of IRAS 17208−0014

Observation data (J2000 epoch)
- Constellation: Ophiuchus
- Right ascension: 17^{h} 23^{m} 21.951^{s}
- Declination: −00° 17′ 00.74″
- Redshift: 0.042810
- Heliocentric radial velocity: 12,824 km/s
- Distance: 617 Mly
- Apparent magnitude (B): 15.1

Characteristics
- Type: LINER
- Size: ~113,700 ly (34.86 kpc) (estimated)
- Notable features: Ultraluminous inflared galaxy

Other designations
- NSA 147958, PGC 60189, C-GOALS 32, NVSS J172321−001702, PMN J1723−0016

IRAS 17208−0014 is an ultraluminous infrared galaxy located about 617 million light-years from Earth in the southern constellation of Ophiuchus. This is a well-studied galaxy hosting an hydroxyl (OH) megamaser, first discovered by the Nancay radio telescope in 1985. The redshift of the galaxy is (z) 0.0428 and it has a total infrared luminosity of 10^{12.4} L_{☉}.

== Description ==
IRAS 17208−0014 is categorized as an advanced galaxy merger, a result of two disk galaxies colliding with one another. It is known to display two tidal tails that are protruding out from the galaxy by 20 kiloparsecs with a distorted central body. The outer disk of the galaxy is disturbed and it has an extended nucleus when shown in near-infrared imaging bands, captured by the Hubble Space Telescope NICMOS camera. The nucleus of the galaxy is compact and elongated along the position angle of 90° to 110°. It is surrounded by both absorption features and condensations. Observations also showed it has a buried active galactic nucleus (AGN) in the western disk of the galaxy. The galaxy has a supermassive black hole located in the center, with a mass of 2.3×10^{8} M_{☉} based on a stellar velocity dispersion.

IRAS 17208−0014 is described as a LINER. It has an X-ray luminosity measured as 1×10^{42} erg s^{−1} when observed by BeppoSAX. There are several star clusters located within the inner region of the galaxy, said to be proto globular systems. The galaxy is powered by intense starbursts with a star formation of 84 ± 13 M_{☉} per year; fueled by a molecular gas reservoir. Carbon monoxide line emission was also detected mainly originating from a molecular disk, found as spatially resolved and measuring a diameter of 2.7 × 1.8 kiloparsecs. There is also evidence of a detached clump and three faint protrusions pushing the disk's emission out to 1.8 kiloparsecs. The mass of the molecular gas outflow is estimated to be 2×10^{8} M_{☉}.

Three nuclear regions have been identified in IRAS 17208−0014, found aligned in a linear pattern along east to west. When imaged by matched resolution at 15 and 33 GHz frequencies by Very Large Array, they are combined into a larger region. A deep study on the OH megamaser in IRAS 17208−0014 showed it having an area of around 170 × 110 parsecs in diameter and mainly found in two dominant regions. The galaxy also shows HCO^{+} emission.
