= Canes II Group =

Galaxy cluster in constellation Canes Venatici

Canes II group

Observation data (Epoch J2000)
- Constellation: Canes Venatici
- Right ascension: 12^{h} 30^{m}
- Declination: +43°
- Brightest member: Messier 106

The Canes II Group or Canes Venatici II Group (CVn II Group) is a group of galaxies about 26.1 million light-years away from Earth. The group resides in the Local Supercluster, within the Coma-Sculptor Cloud. The largest galaxy within the cluster is M106 (NGC 4258), which is a barred spiral galaxy.

== Galaxies in the Cluster ==
Canes II is directly behind Canes I, which makes it difficult to show which galaxy belongs in which cluster. It is generally accepted that the following galaxies belong in Canes II;

Name	Equatorial Coordinates	Declination	Blue Magnitude	Type	Angular Diameter arc.	Galaxy Diameter (Kly)	Recessional Velocity	Other Names
NGC 4096	12 06.0	+47 29	11.5	Barred Spiral-c	6.5	55	770	None
NGC 4144	12 10.0	+46 27	12.2	Barred Spiral-c	6.0	55	481	
UGC 7267	12 15.4	+51 22	15.3	Spiral-d	1.7	15	660	
UGC 7271	12 15.6	+43 26	15.5	Spiral-c	1.6	15	772	
UGC 7298	12 16.5	+52 13	17	Irregular	1.3	10	354	
UGC 7320	12 17.5	+44 29	Unknown	Spiral-d	.9	10	740	
NGC 4242	12 17.5	+45 37	11.7	Barred Spiral-m	4.8	40	733	
NGC 4248	12 17.8	+47 25	13.4	Barred Spiral-b	2.4	20	693	
M106	12 19.0	+47 18	9.1	Barred Spiral-b	17.0	150	656	NGC 4258
UGC 7356	12 19.2	+47 05	15.8	Irregular	.9	10	480	
NGC 4288	12 20.6	+46 18	13.4	Barred Spiral-c	2.2	20	746	
UGC 7408	12 21.3	+45 49	13.4	Irregular	2.6	20	675	DDO 120
UGC 7599	12 28.5	+37 14	14.9	Spiral-m	1.9	15	527	DDO 127
UGC 7608	12 28.8	+43 14	13.7	Irregular	3.5	30	760	DDO 129
NGC 4460	12 28.8	+44 52	12.8	Spiral-0	4.1	35	711	
UGC 7639	12 29.9	+47 32	14.5	Irregular	2.4	20	585	
KK151	12 30.4	+42 54	16.5	Spiral-c	1.1	10	660	PGC 41314
NGC 4485	12 30.5	+41 42	12.5	Irregular	2.4	20	725	
NGC 4490	12 30.6	+41 38	10.6	Barred Spiral-c	6.3	55	809	
UGC 7678	12 32.0	+39 50	16.1	Barred Spiral	0.9	10	921	
UGC 7690	12 32.4	+42 42	13.4	Irregular	1.6	15	762	
UGC 7699	12 32.8	+37 37	13.6	Barred Spiral-c	3.8	35	743	
UGC 7719	12 34.0	+39 01	15.3	Spiral-d	1.9	15	920	
UGC 7751	12 35.1	+41 03	17.6	Irregular	0.7	5	835	
UGC 7774	12 36.4	+40 00	15.0	Spiral-c	3.0	25	758	
UGC 7827	12 39.7	+44 51	17?	Irregular	1.2	10	765	
NGC 4618	12 41.6	+41 09	11.4	Barred Spiral-d	4.4	40	771	
NGC 4625	12 41.9	+41 16	13.1	Barred Spiral-m	2.1	20	837	
UGC 7949	12 47.0	+36 29	15.1	Irregular	1.9	15	578	DDO 147
NGC 4707	12 48.4	+51 10	13.4	Spiral-m	2.2	20	646	

== See also ==
- Canes I Group (CVn I GrG)
- Canes Venatici Cloud
