= IRAS F01364−1042 =

Galaxy in the constellation Cetus

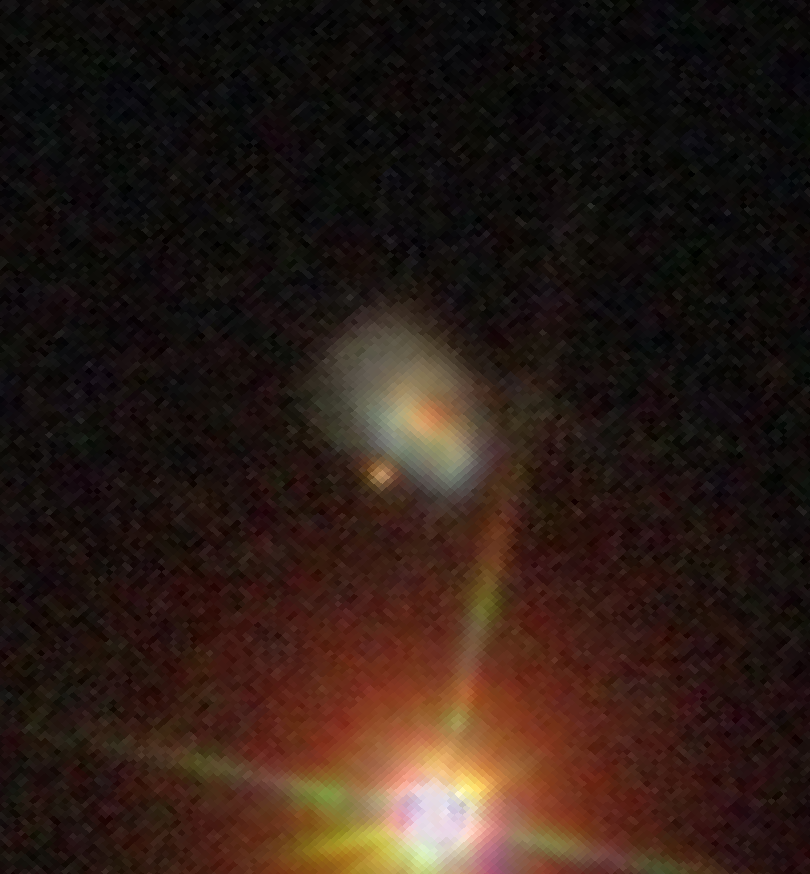
- SDSS image of IRAS F01364−1042

Observation data (J2000 epoch)
- Constellation: Cetus
- Right ascension: 01^{h} 38^{m} 52.86^{s}
- Declination: −10° 27′ 11.73″
- Redshift: 0.048232
- Heliocentric radial velocity: 14,459 ± 2 km/s
- Distance: 696.5 ± 48.8 Mly (213.55 ± 14.95 Mpc)
- magnitude (J): 14.13

Characteristics
- Type: LINER;LIRG HII?
- Size: ~86,000 ly (26.4 kpc) (estimated)

Other designations
- 6dF J0138529-102712, C-GOALS 01, NSA 022782, LEDA 101303, IRAS 01364-1042, PCCMC 054, NVSS J013852-102711

IRAS F01364−1042 is a galaxy merger located about 690 million light years away in the constellation of Cetus. The redshift of the galaxy is (z) 0.048 and it was first discovered by astronomers from the IRAS Survey of bright galaxies in September 1987. It is classified as a luminous infrared galaxy and such contains a hydroxide (OH) megamaser with at least two components showing a velocity separation gap of 200 kilometers per seconds.

== Description ==
IRAS F01364−1042 is classified as a late-stage gas-rich or a stage 5 galaxy merger. The galaxy is classified to be an elliptical based on a study in 2019, with confirmed evidence of only a single nucleus suggesting the nuclei have already merged together and no signs of tidal features. The central supermassive black hole of the galaxy is around 2.37^{+0.01}_{-0.1} × 10^{9} M_{☉}. The total infrared luminosity of the galaxy is 11.85 L_{☉}. A study in 2022, has detected at least one nuclear region located close to both the infrared and optical peaks of the galaxy.

The carbon oxide (CO) emission of the galaxy is depicted having a disk-like morphology, seen edge-on, with central source that is marginally resolved. The molecular mass of the galaxy is estimated to be 6.7 ± 2.8 × 10^{8} M_{☉}. The total star formation rate of the galaxy is estimated to be 47 M_{☉} per year and the galaxy itself has a low ionization nuclear emission line region (LINER) type active galactic nucleus (AGN). A stellar disk mass of the galaxy has been calculated to be 2.8 ± 0.9 × 10^{9} M_{☉}.

A study published in 2019, has found the galaxy has a gas disk shown as rotating. When observed, the disk is shown have traces of hydrogen gas (H_{2}) extending towards the south direction between both the major and minor axis, suggesting the possibility of an outflowing structure that is traced by the H_{2} structure.
