= NGC 5495 =

Galaxy in the constellation Hydra

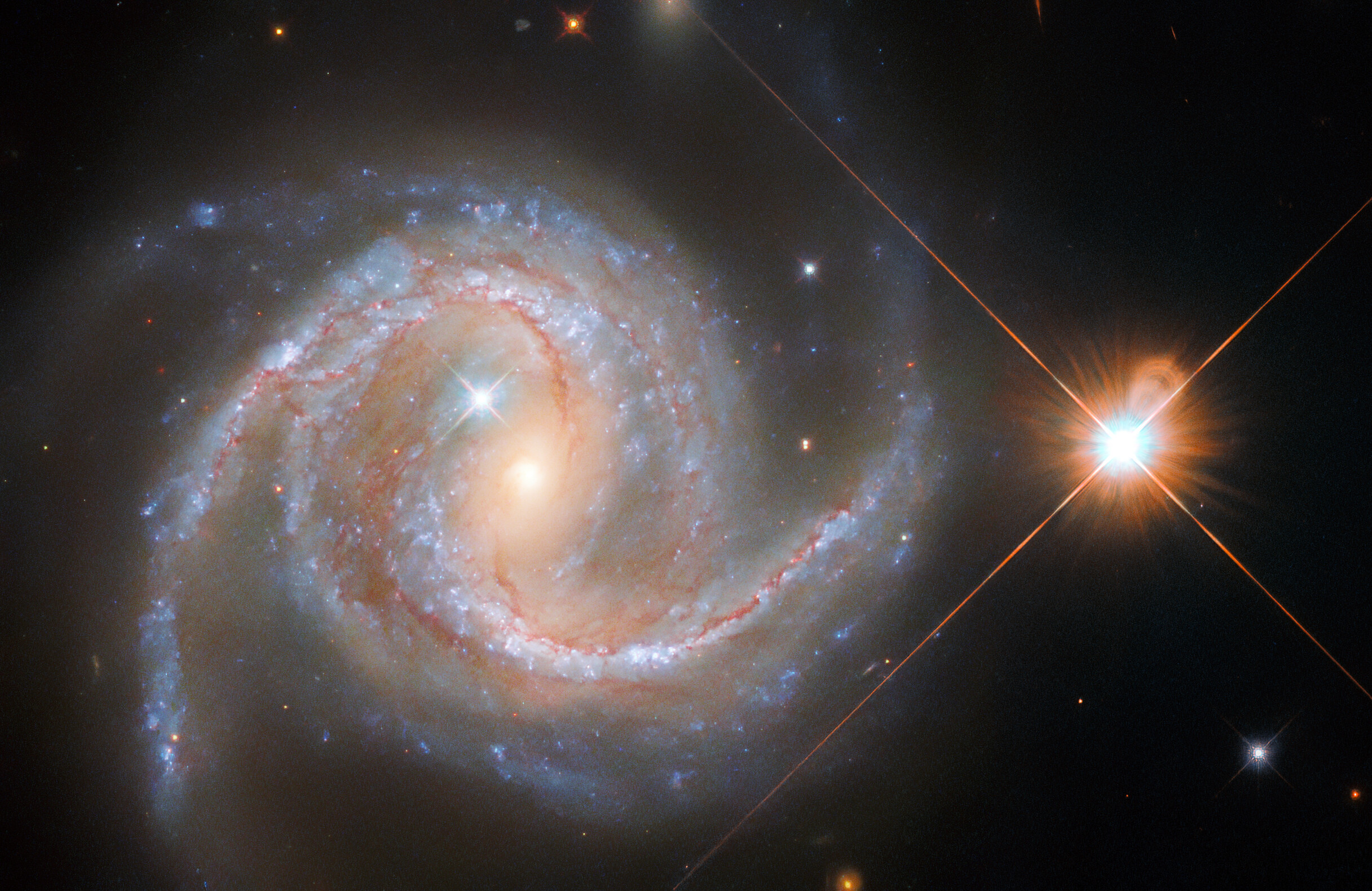
- NGC 5495 imaged by the Hubble Space Telescope

Observation data (J2000 epoch)
- Constellation: Hydra
- Right ascension: 14^{h} 12^{m} 23.3522^{s}
- Declination: −27° 06′ 29.777″
- Redshift: 0.022472
- Heliocentric radial velocity: 6,737±9 km/s
- Distance: 336.2 ± 23.5 Mly (103.08 ± 7.22 Mpc)
- Apparent magnitude (V): 13.5
- Apparent magnitude (B): 13.53
- Surface brightness: 23.02 mag/arcsec^2

Characteristics
- Type: (R')SAB(r)c
- Size: ~259,500 ly (79.56 kpc) (estimated)
- Apparent size (V): 1.4′ × 1.1′

Other designations
- ESO 510-10, AM 1409-265, IRAS 14095-2652, MCG -04-34-001, PGC 50729

NGC 5495 is a very large barred spiral galaxy located in the constellation Hydra. Its speed relative to the cosmic microwave background is 6,989 ± 20 km/s, corresponding to a Hubble distance of 103.1 ± 7.2 Mpc (~336 million ly). NGC 5495 was discovered by British astronomer John Herschel on 13 May 1834.

The luminosity class of NGC 5495 is III and it has a broad HI line. It also contains regions of ionized hydrogen, and is classified as an active Seyfert 2 type galaxy.

Additionally, NGC 5495 is known to host a megamaser. Further evidence shows signs of H_{2}O maser emission, detected via 70m NASA Deep Space Network antennas in Australia and Spain. The source spectra in NGC 5495 is said to have an emission signature originating from its accretion disk with an orbital velocity of ~400 km s^{−1}.

The galaxy was showcased as ESA/HUBBLE's Picture of the Week on 26 September 2022. The magnitude 12.2 star near the galaxy's eastern edge is catalogued as TYC 6738-702-1.

== See also ==
- Whirlpool Galaxy, another spiral galaxy with a similar shape
- List of NGC objects (5001–6000)
