= NGC 5765 =

Interacting galaxy pair in the constellation Virgo

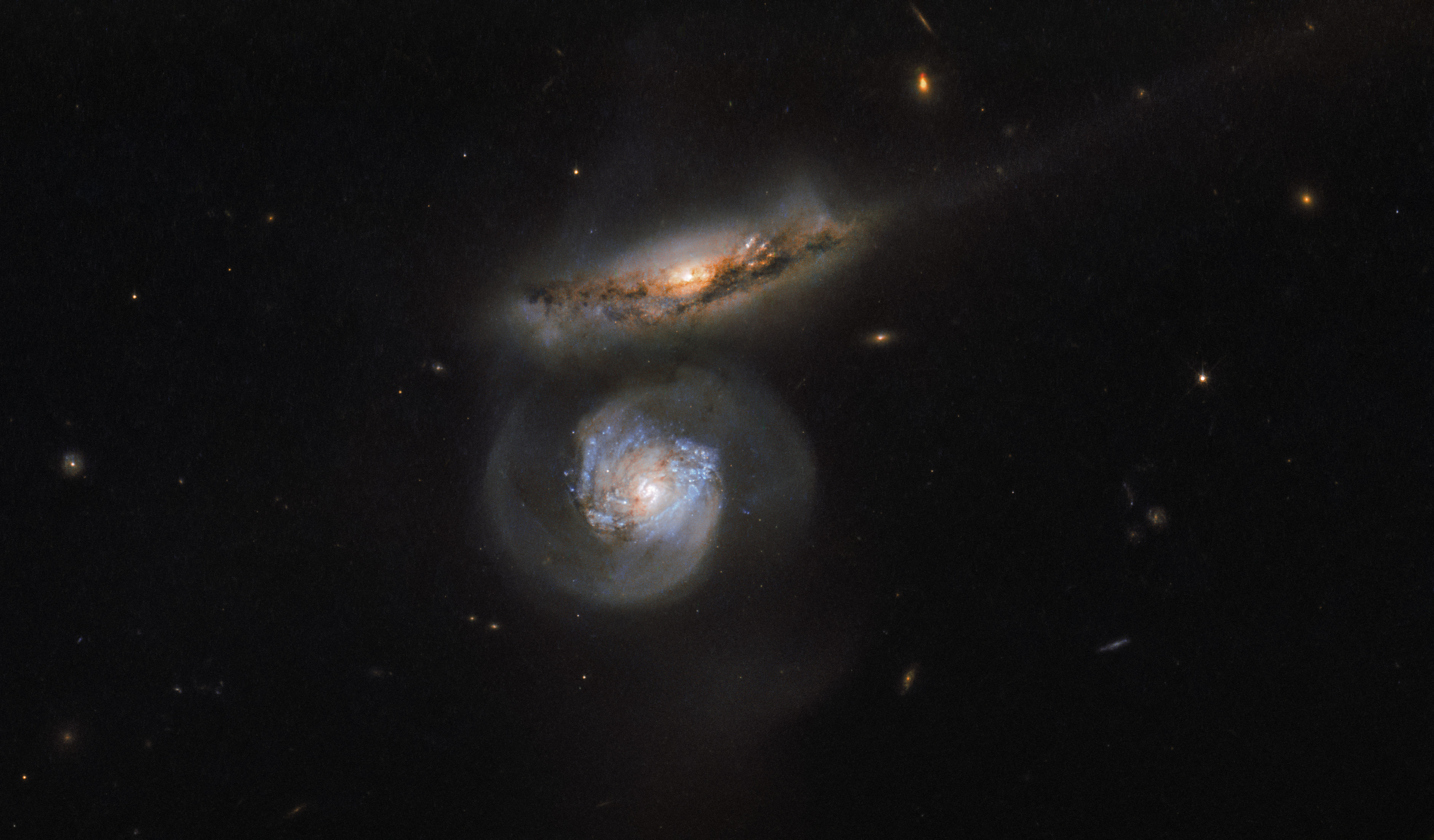
- NGC 5765, seen from the Hubble Space Telescope. NGC 5765A is the upper galaxy, while NGC 5765B is the lower.

Observation data (J2000 epoch)
- Constellation: Virgo
- Right ascension: 14^{h} 50^{m} 50.4^{s}
- Declination: +05° 06′ 57″
- Redshift: 0.027836
- Distance: ~400 million ly
- Apparent magnitude (B): 14.6

Characteristics
- Type: Sy2

Other designations
- MCG+01-38-004, MCG+01-38-005, IRAS 14483+0519, KPG 437, PSCz Q14483+0519, UGC 9554

NGC 5765, also designated as MCG+01-38-004 and MCG+01-38-005, is a pair of interacting megamasers in the constellation Virgo, roughly 400,000,000 light-years (120,000,000 pc) away from Earth. NGC 5765B is active, and energy is released from the core, some of which is absorbed by a nearby cloud of water. The cloud then re-emits this energy as microwaves. These emissions were used to help redefine the Hubble constant.
