= NGC 4242 =

Galaxy in constellation Canes Venatici

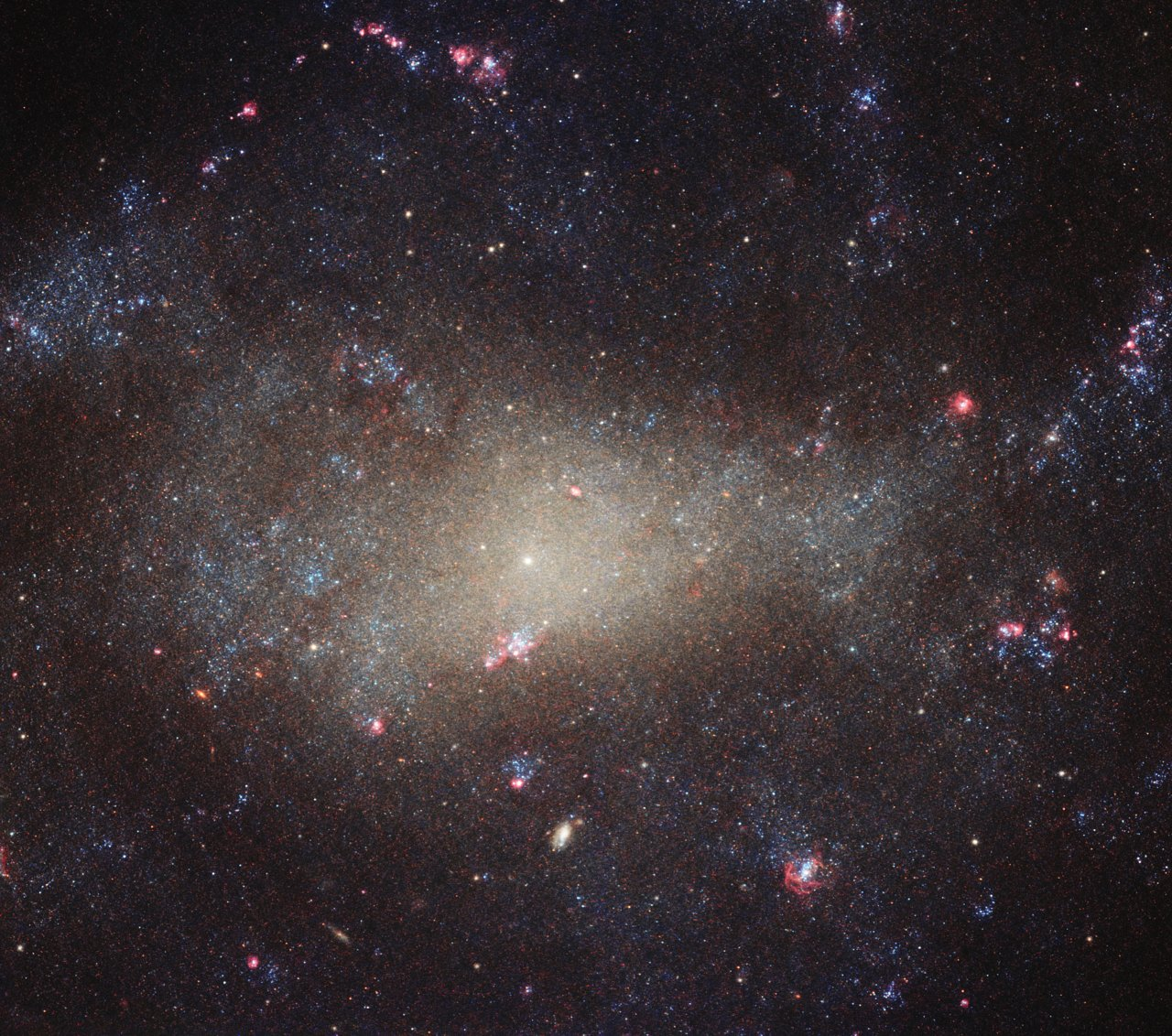
- NGC 4242 imaged by the Hubble Space Telescope

Observation data (J2000 epoch)
- Constellation: Canes Venatici
- Right ascension: 12^{h} 17^{m} 30.174^{s}
- Declination: +45° 37′ 09.46″
- Redshift: 0.00176
- Heliocentric radial velocity: 527 km/s
- Distance: 17.78 ± 0.65 Mly (5.45 ± 0.20 Mpc)
- Group or cluster: Canes II Group
- Apparent magnitude (V): 11.37
- Apparent magnitude (B): 10.83

Characteristics
- Type: SABdm
- Apparent size (V): 5.0′ × 0.38′

Other designations
- NGC 4242, UGC 7323, MCG +08-22-098, PGC 39423

NGC 4242 is a spiral galaxy in the northern constellation of Canes Venatici. The galaxy is about 18 million light years (5.5 megaparsecs) away. It was discovered on 10 April 1788 by William Herschel, and it was described as "very faint, considerably large, irregular, round, very gradually brighter in the middle, resolvable" by John Louis Emil Dreyer, the compiler of the New General Catalogue.

NGC 4242's galaxy morphological type is SABdm. This means that it is an intermediate spiral galaxy, with loosely wound spiral arms and is generally irregular in appearance. It was photographed by the Hubble Space Telescope in 2017. The image shows an asymmetric center and a small galactic bar. NGC 4242 has a relatively low surface brightness and rate of star formation. NGC 4242 may be a satellite galaxy of Messier 106 and is a member of the Canes II Group.

SN 2002bu was detected in NGC 4242, brightening to its peak magnitude of 15.5 in 2002. It was originally classified as a type II supernova. In 2011, it was thought to be a supernova impostor like SN 2008S, and in 2021 researchers reclassified it as a gap transient.

== Gallery ==
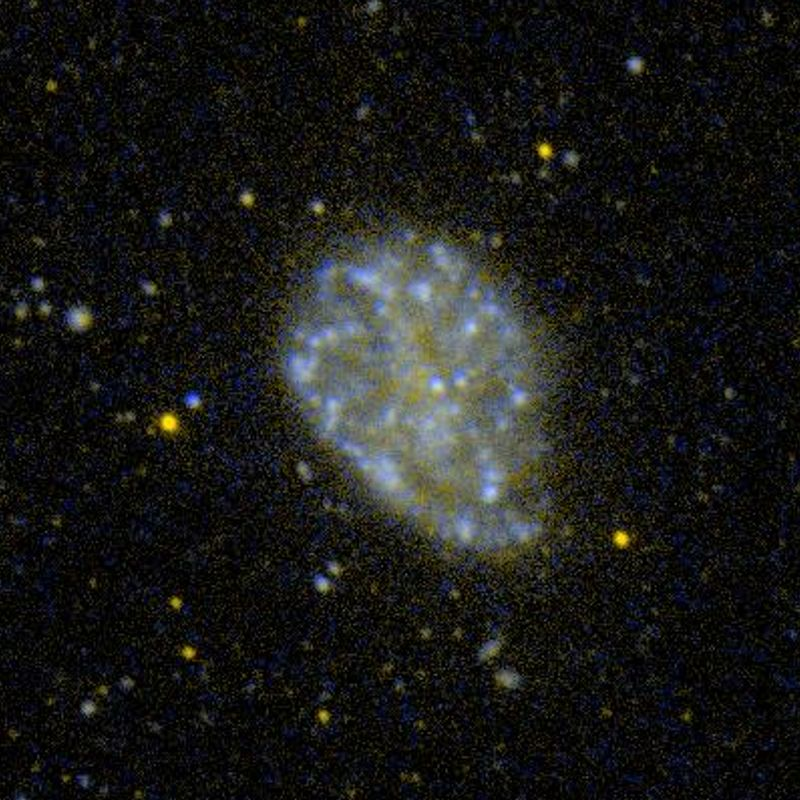
NGC 4242 by GALEX

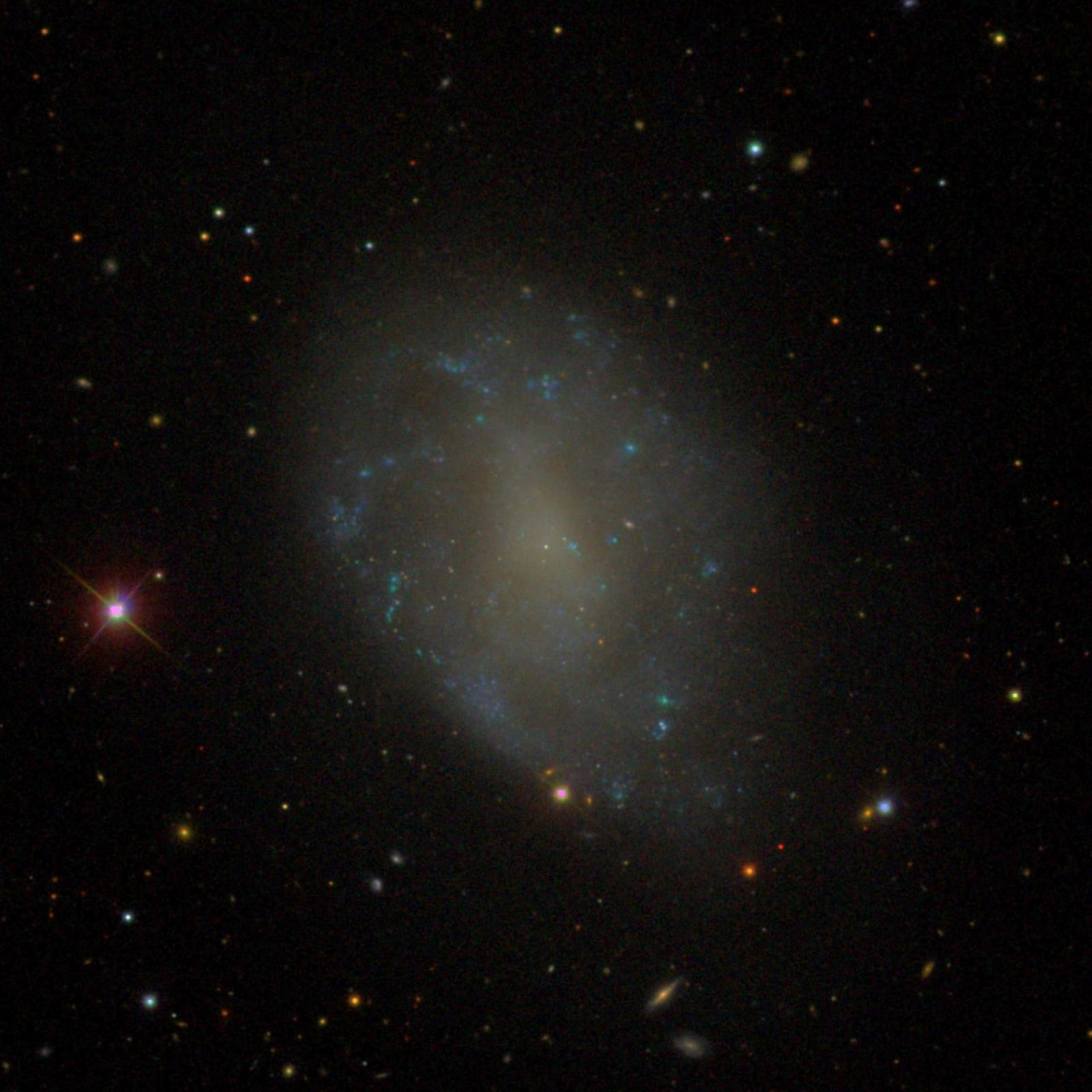
NGC 4242 by the Sloan Digital Sky Survey

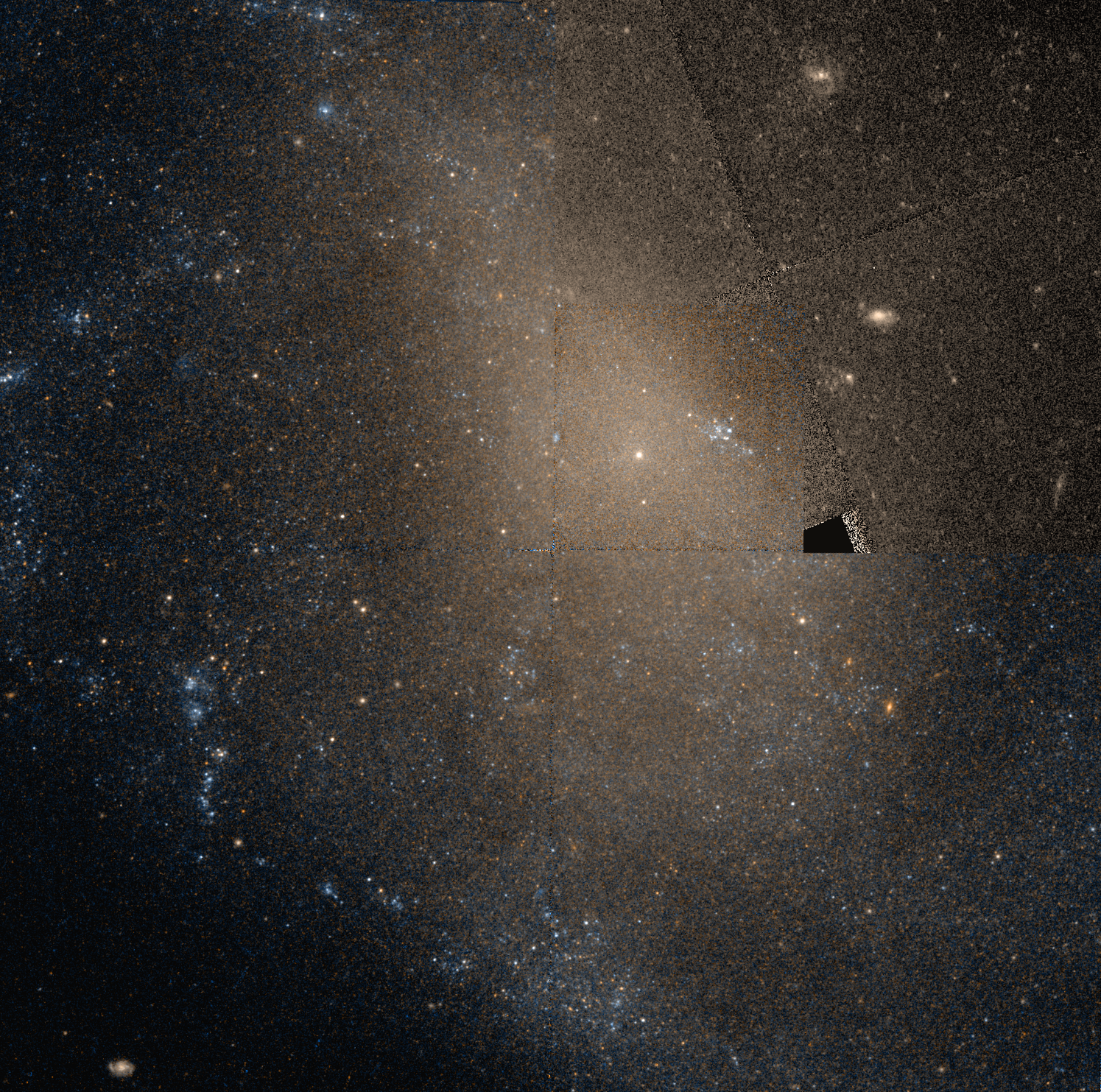
Hubble Space Telescope image of NGC 4242.
