= Arp 220 =

Luminous infrared galaxy in the constellation Serpens

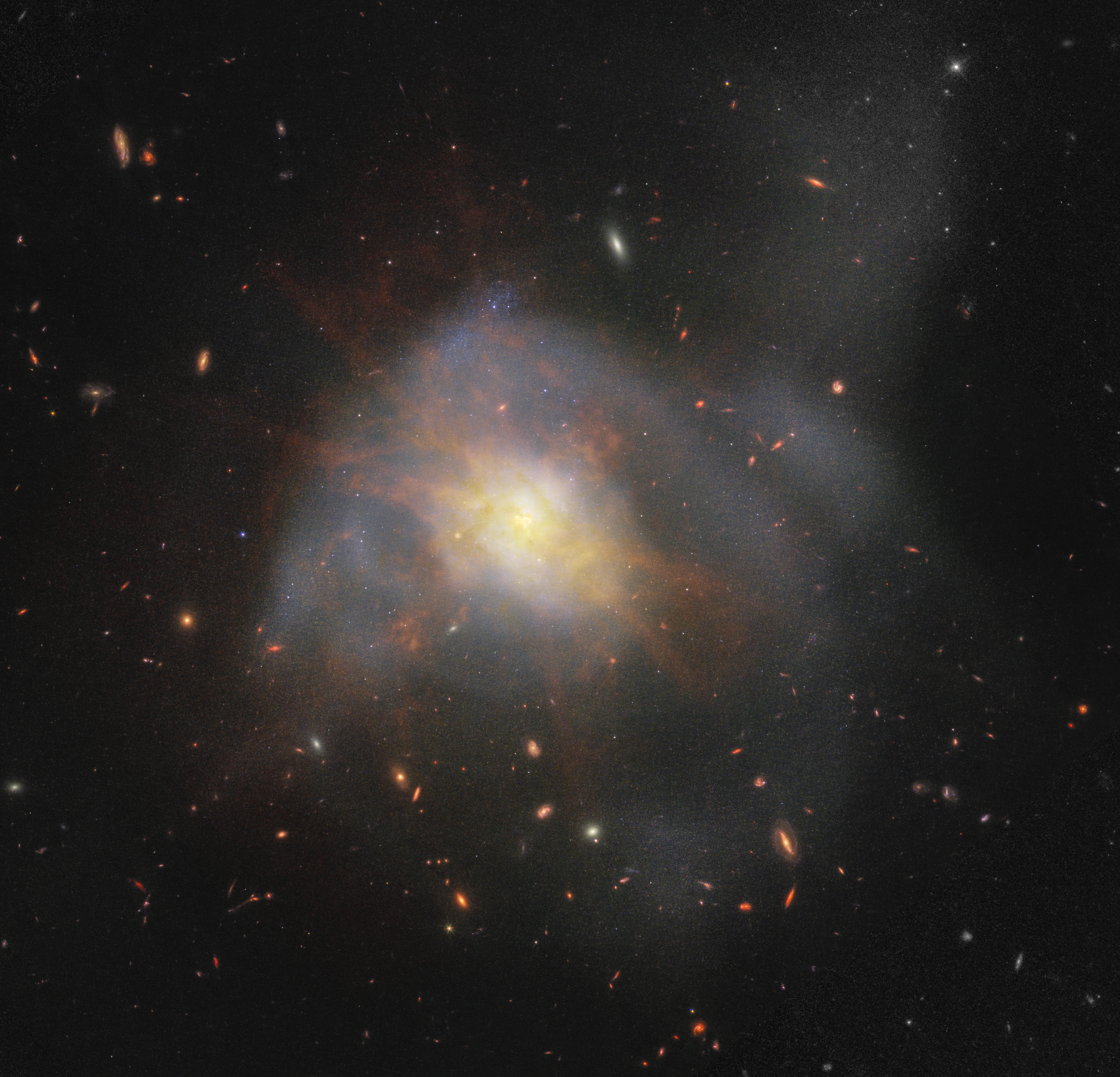
- A combination of James Webb Space Telescope and Hubble Space Telescope data showing a new view infrared galaxy Arp 220

Observation data (J2000 epoch)
- Constellation: Serpens
- Right ascension: 15^{h} 34^{m} 57.1^{s}
- Declination: +23° 30′ 11″
- Redshift: 0.01840±0.00002
- Heliocentric radial velocity: 5434 ± 7 km/s
- Apparent magnitude (V): 13.9

Characteristics
- Type: S?
- Size: 33.7 kpc (110,000 ly)
- Apparent size (V): 1.5′ × 1.2′

Other designations
- IC 1127, IC 4553, UGC 9913, PGC 55497

Arp 220 is the result of a collision between two galaxies which are now in the process of merging. It is the 220th object in Halton Arp's Atlas of Peculiar Galaxies.

== Features ==
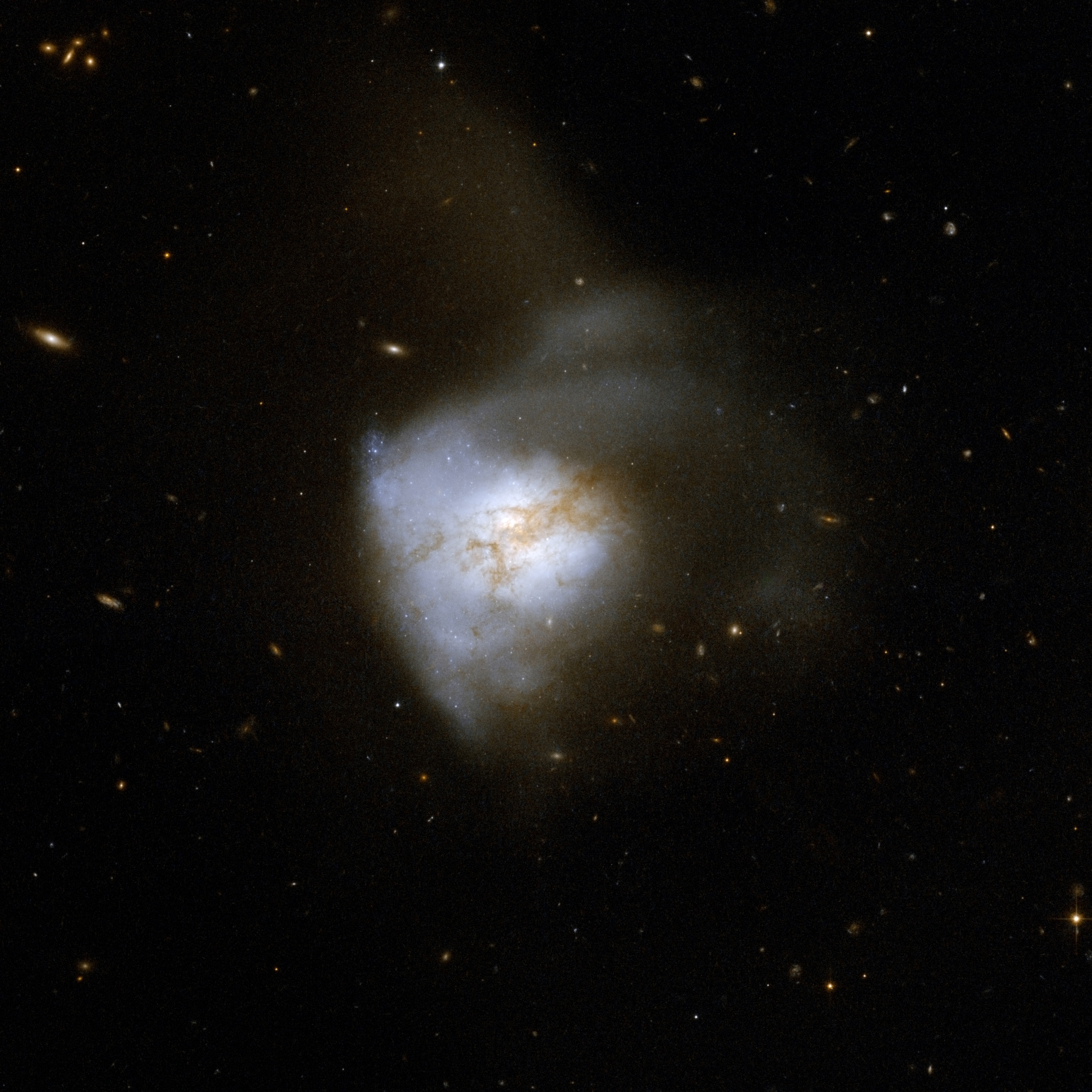
Wider angle (2.4′ ) view by Hubble Space Telescope

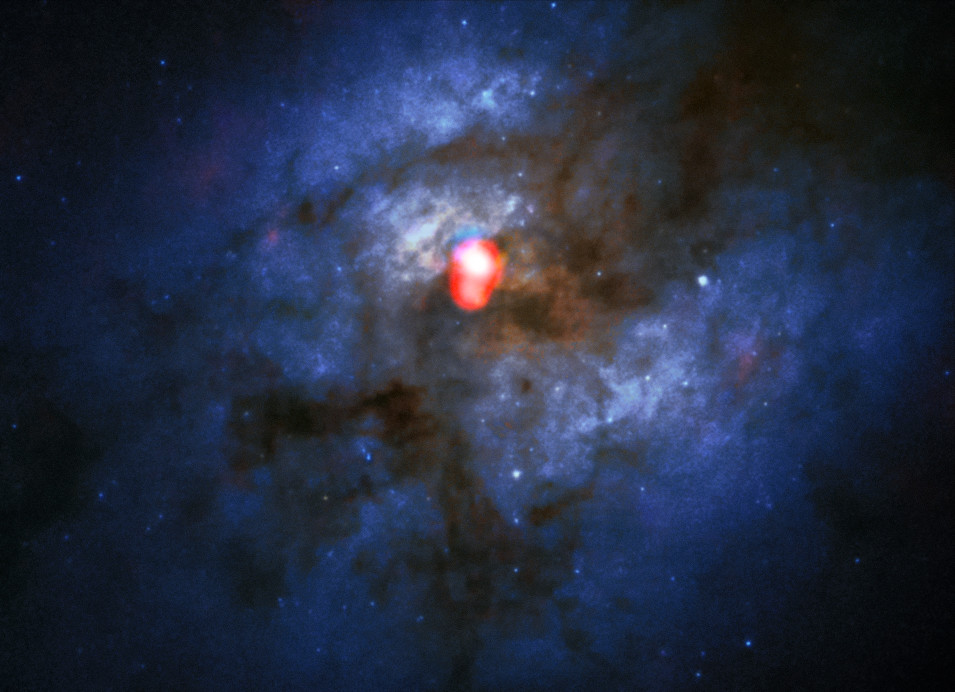
Compound view shows an ALMA Band 5 image of the colliding galaxy system Arp 220.

Arp 220 is the closest ultraluminous infrared galaxy (ULIRG) to Earth, at 250 million light years away. Its energy output was discovered by IRAS to be dominated by the far-infrared part of the spectrum. It is often regarded as the prototypical ULIRG and has been the subject of much study as a result. Most of its energy output is thought to be the result of a massive burst of star formation, or starburst, probably triggered by the merging of two smaller galaxies. Hubble Space Telescope observations of Arp 220 in 2002 and 1997, taken in visible light with the ACS, and in infrared light with NICMOS, revealed more than 200 huge star clusters in the central part of the galaxy. The most massive of these clusters contains enough material to equal about 10 million suns. X-ray observations by the Chandra and XMM-Newton satellites have shown that Arp 220 probably includes an active galactic nucleus (AGN) at its core, which raises interesting questions about the link between galaxy mergers and AGN, since it is believed that galactic mergers often trigger starbursts, and may also give rise to the supermassive black holes that appear to power AGN.

Luminous far-infrared objects like Arp 220 have been found in surprisingly large numbers by sky surveys of submillimetre wavelengths using instruments such as the Submillimetre Common-User Bolometer Array (SCUBA) at the James Clerk Maxwell Telescope (JCMT). Arp 220 and other relatively local ULIRGs are being studied as equivalents of this kind of object.

Astronomers from the Arecibo Observatory have detected organic molecules in the galaxy.

Arp 220 contains at least two bright maser sources, an OH megamaser, and a water maser. In October 2011, astronomers spotted a record-breaking seven supernova all found at the same time in Arp 220. The merging of the two galaxies started around 700 million years ago.
