= NGC 4490 =

Interacting galaxy in constellation Canes Venatici

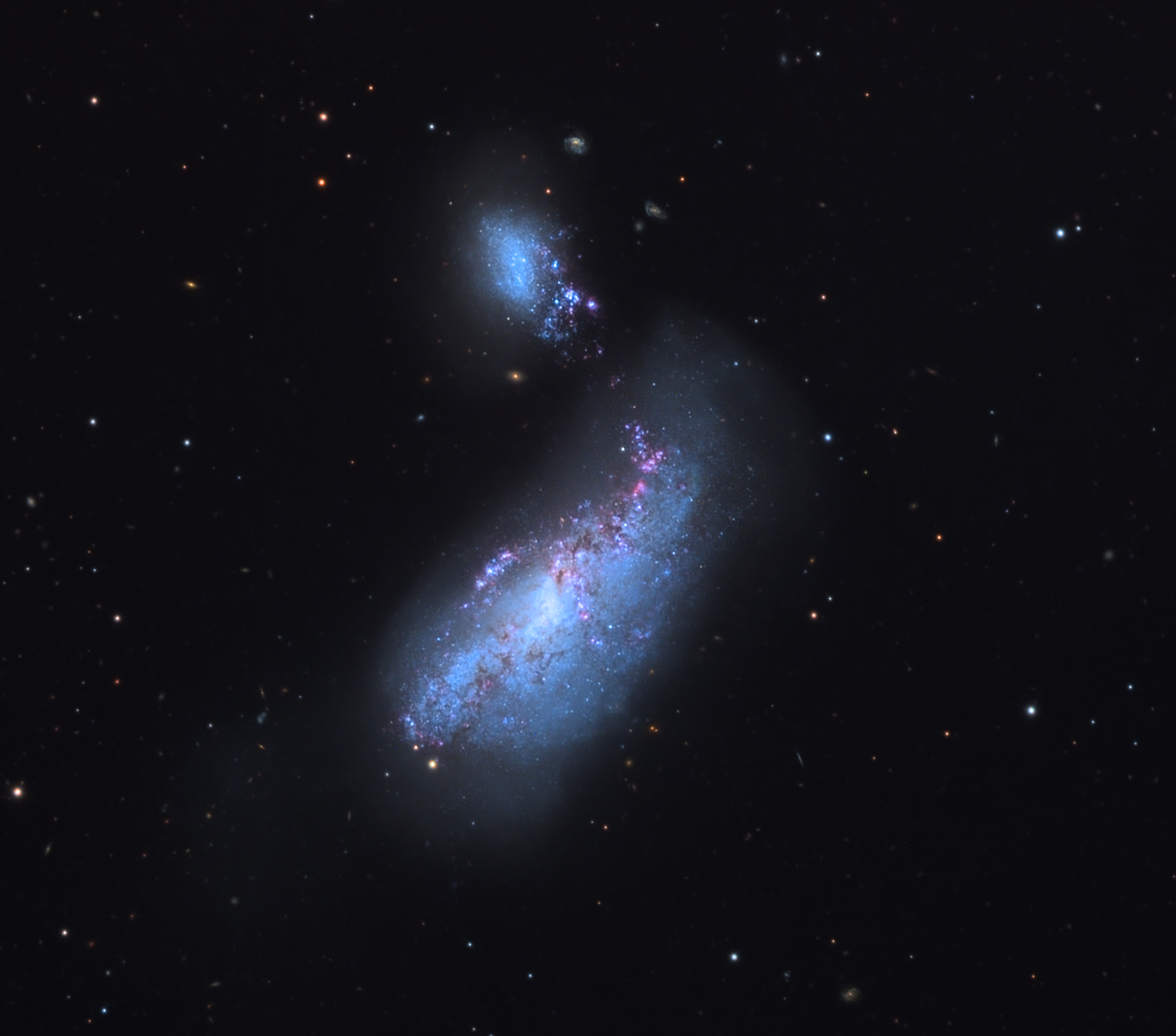
- NGC 4490 and satellite galaxy, NGC 4485

Observation data (J2000 epoch)
- Constellation: Canes Venatici
- Right ascension: 12^{h} 30^{m} 36.2390^{s}
- Declination: 41° 38′ 38.032″
- Redshift: 0.001885
- Heliocentric radial velocity: 565±3 km/s
- Distance: 25.1 ± 5.0 Mly (7.7 ± 1.5 Mpc)
- Group or cluster: Canes II Group
- Apparent magnitude (V): 9.5

Characteristics
- Type: SB(s)d pec
- Size: ~40,200 ly (12.34 kpc) (estimated)
- Apparent size (V): 6.4′ × 3.2′

Other designations
- HOLM 414A, IRAS 12281+4155, NGC 4490, Arp 269 NED02, UGC 7651, MCG +07-26-014, PGC 41333, CGCG 216-008, VV 030a

NGC 4490 is a barred spiral galaxy in the constellation Canes Venatici, located 45 arcminutes northwest of the star Beta Canum Venaticorum. Alternatively, it is known as the Cocoon Galaxy. It was discovered by German-British astronomer William Herschel on 14 January 1788, and is listed in the Herschel 400 Catalogue. With an apparent visual magnitude of 9.8 and spanning an angular size of 6.4′ × 3.2′, it can be observed with 15x100 binoculars.

This galaxy lies at a distance of 25 million light years from Earth, where it is a member of the Canes II Group of galaxies. It is one of the closest interacting/merging galactic systems, interacting with its smaller companion NGC 4485 and as a result is a starburst galaxy. NGC 4490 and NGC 4485 are collectively known in the Atlas of Peculiar Galaxies as Arp 269.

The two galaxies have already made their closest approach and are rushing away from each other. A stellar stream 25,000 light years long connects the two interacting galaxies. The stellar stream is made of bright knots and large gas rich pockets. Young blue hot massive stars are formed in this region.

It has been discovered that NGC 4490 has a double nucleus. NGC 4490 has a system of satellite galaxies oriented roughly in a plane.

== Supernovae and Luminous Red Nova ==
Two supernovae and one luminous red nova (LRN) have been observed in NGC 4490:

- SN 1982F (type unknown, mag. 16) was discovered by Swiss astronomer Paul Wild on 15 April 1982.
- SN 2008ax (Type II, mag. 13) was discovered by the Lick Observatory Supernova Search (LOSS) on 3 March 2008 and by Kōichi Itagaki on 4 March 2008.
- AT 2011kp (type LRN, mag. 16.7) was discovered by Giancarlo Cortini and Stefano Antonellini on 16 August 2011.

== Gallery ==
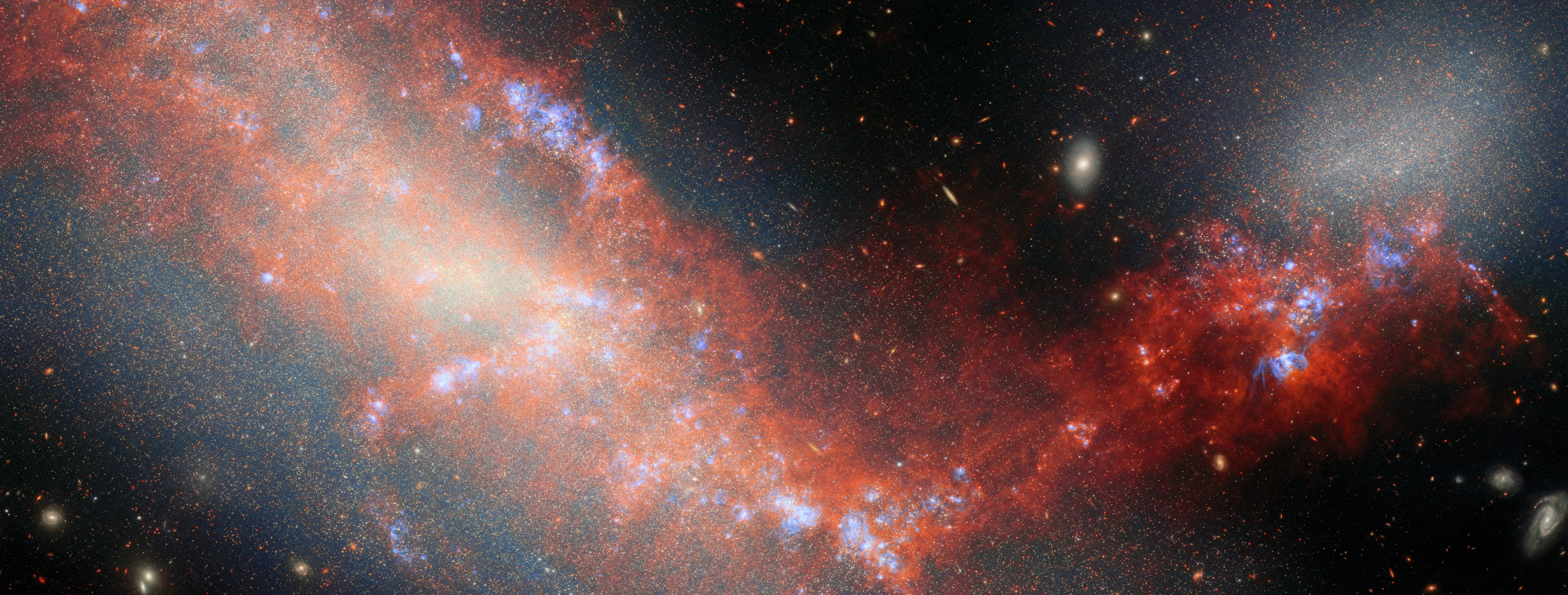
NGC 4490 and NGC 4485 imaged by the James Webb Space Telescope

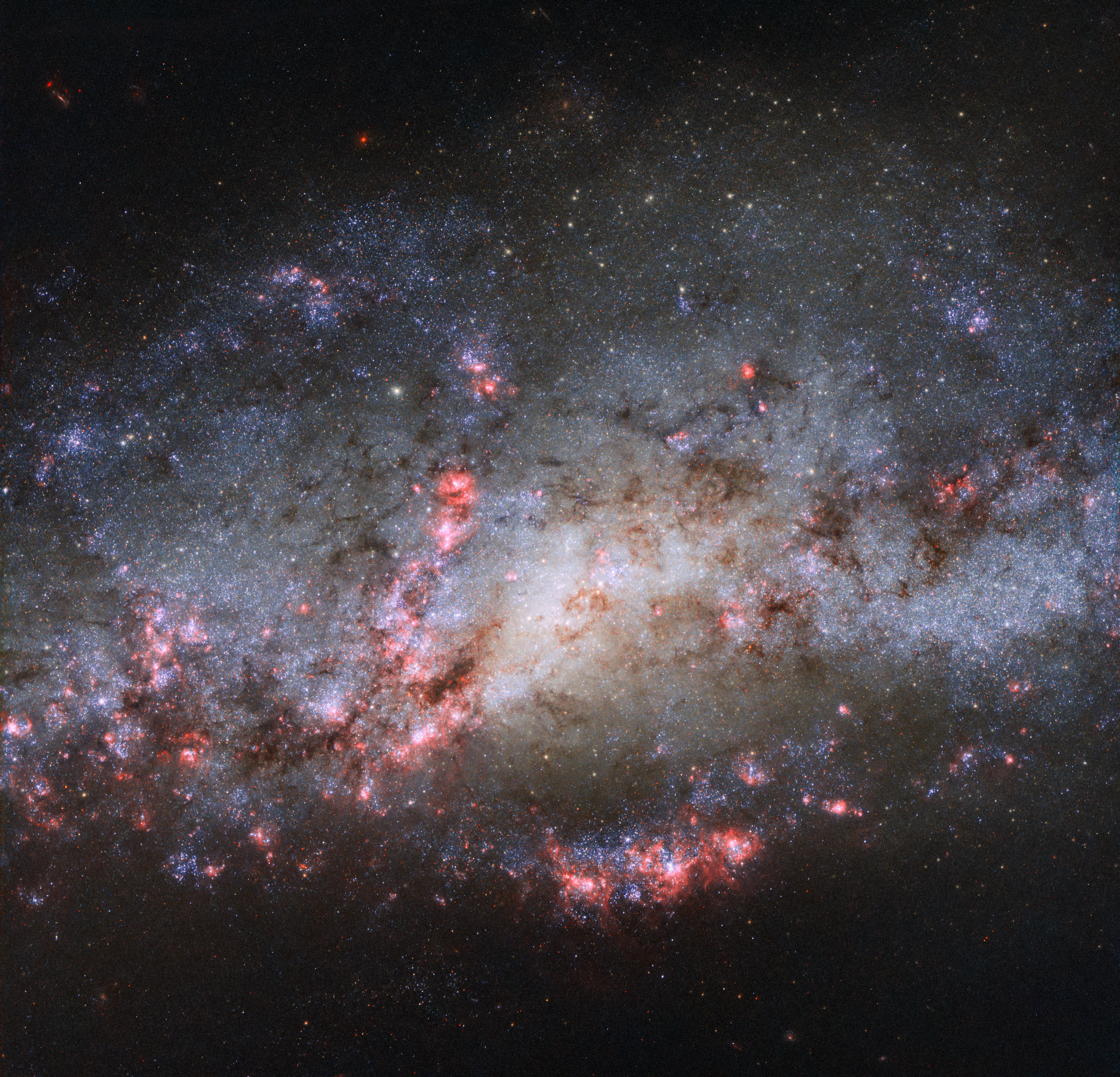
Extreme tidal forces have carved out the shapes and properties of NGC 4490.

== See also ==
- Barred spiral galaxy
- Canes Venatici (constellation)
