= SN 2008ax =

2008 supernova event in constellation Canes Venatici

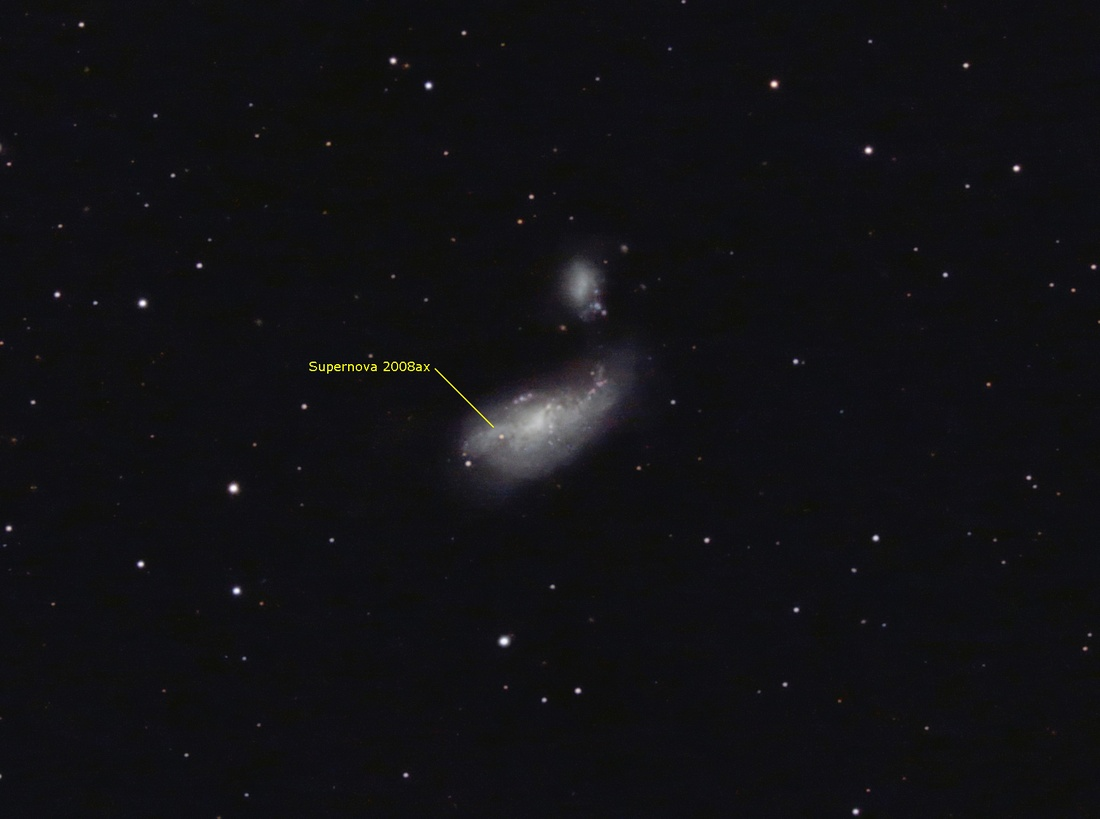
- Position of SN 2008ax in NGC 4490; image courtesy of Hunter Wilson
- Event type: Supernova
- Type Ib
- Date: 3 March 2008
- Constellation: Canes Venatici
- Right ascension: 12^{h} 30^{m} 40.80^{s}
- Declination: +41° 38′ 16.1″
- Epoch: J2000.0
- Galactic coordinates: b = 137.95°, l = +74.88°
- Distance: 31 Mly (9.6 Mpc)
- Source: NGC 4490
- Peak apparent magnitude: +13.0

SN 2008ax was a helium-rich Type Ib core-collapse supernova in the interacting galaxy NGC 4490. It was independently discovered on 3 March 2008 by LOSS and 4 March by Kōichi Itagaki. The site had been monitored six hours before discovery, thus constraining the time of the explosion breakout. It was the third-brightest supernova of 2008. The brightness in the B-band peaked about 20 days after the explosion. X-ray emissions were detected from the event, which are most likely the result of shock heating from the supernova ejecta and circumstellar material.

Images of the source location made using the Hubble Space Telescope in 2011 and 2013 were used to identify the progenitor. If it was a single star, the images are compatible with a supergiant star with a class of B to mid-A type. However, this is not favored by models which indicate the progenitor had a relatively low mass of 4–5 M_{☉} and extended hydrogen-rich atmosphere with a radius of 30–40 R_{☉}. An alternative, more plausible model suggests the progenitor was part of an interacting binary system where much of the atmosphere was lost through mass transfer to the companion.
