= NGC 4144 =

Galaxy in the constellation Ursa Major

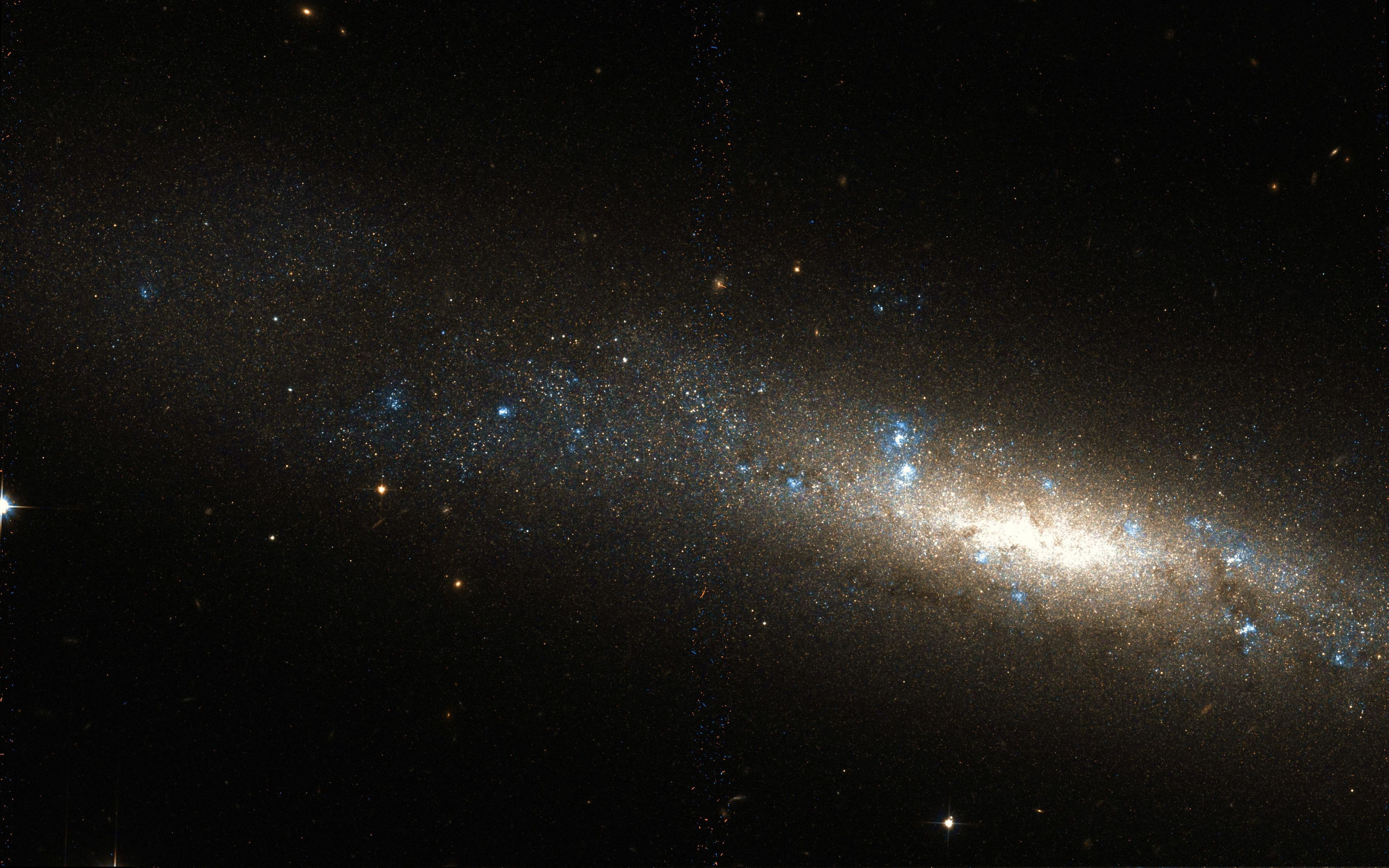
- Hubble Space Telescope image of NGC 4144

Observation data (J2000 epoch)
- Constellation: Ursa Major
- Right ascension: 12^{h} 09^{m} 58^{s}
- Declination: +46° 27′ 25″
- Apparent magnitude (B): 12.17

Characteristics
- Type: Im/BCD C

Other designations
- NGC 4144, IRAS F12074+4644, 2MASX J12095860+4627258, UGC 7151, PGC 38688

NGC 4144 is a barred spiral galaxy located in the constellation Ursa Major. It was discovered by the German-born British astronomer William Herschel on April 10, 1788. The galaxy is also known by several other catalog names, including IRAS F12074+4644, 2MASX J12095860+4627258, UGC 7151, and PGC 38688. It has an apparent magnitude of 12.17 in the blue band.

== Description ==
NGC 4144 is a barred spiral galaxy classified as Im/BCD C, meaning it displays features of both irregular and blue compact dwarf galaxies. The galaxy is situated approximately 40 million light-years away from Earth. It is part of the Ursa Major Group, which consists of several galaxies in close proximity to each other. NGC 4144 is particularly notable for its faint appearance and for being relatively difficult to observe without a telescope due to its low luminosity.

== Gallery ==
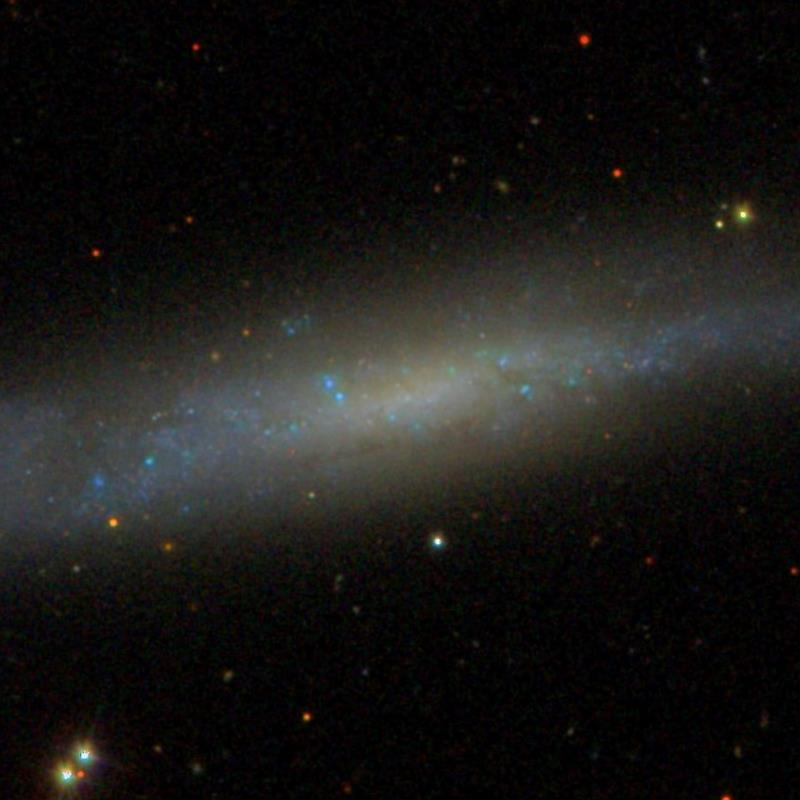
NGC 4144 by the Sloan Digital Sky Survey

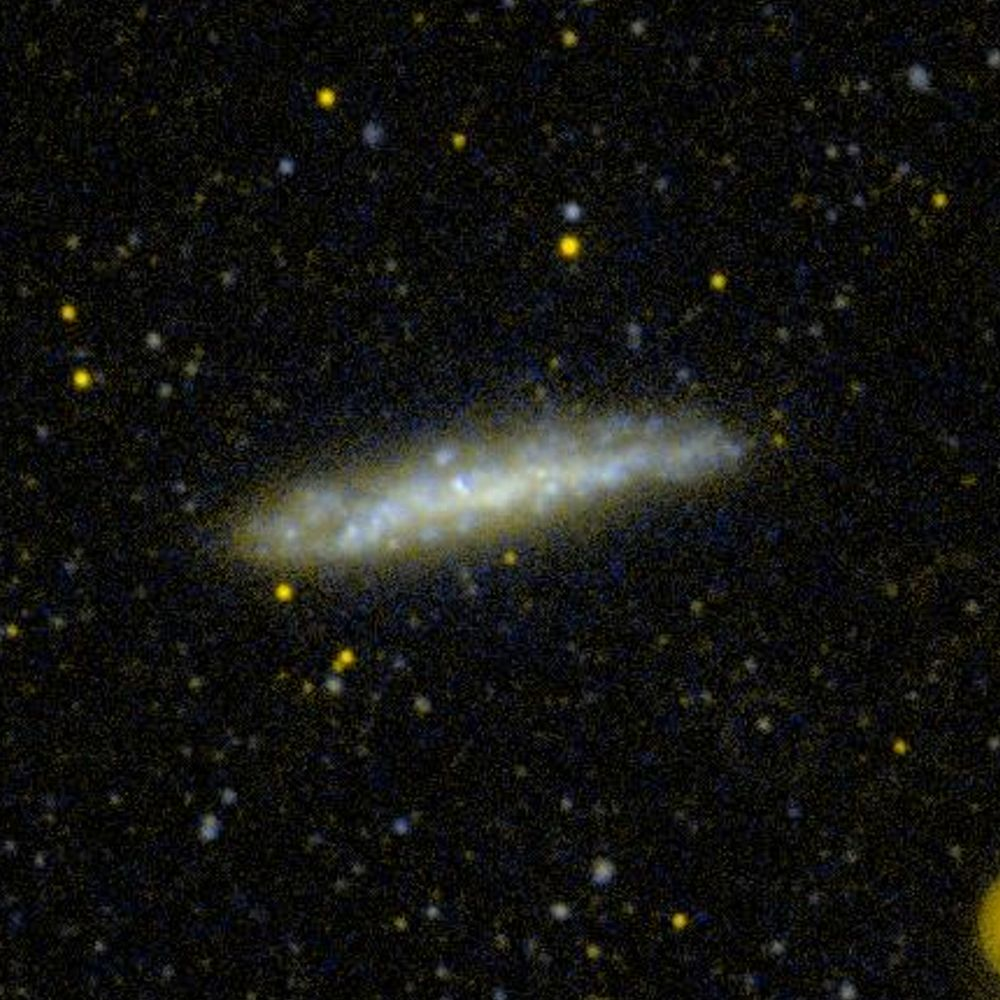
NGC 4144 by GALEX

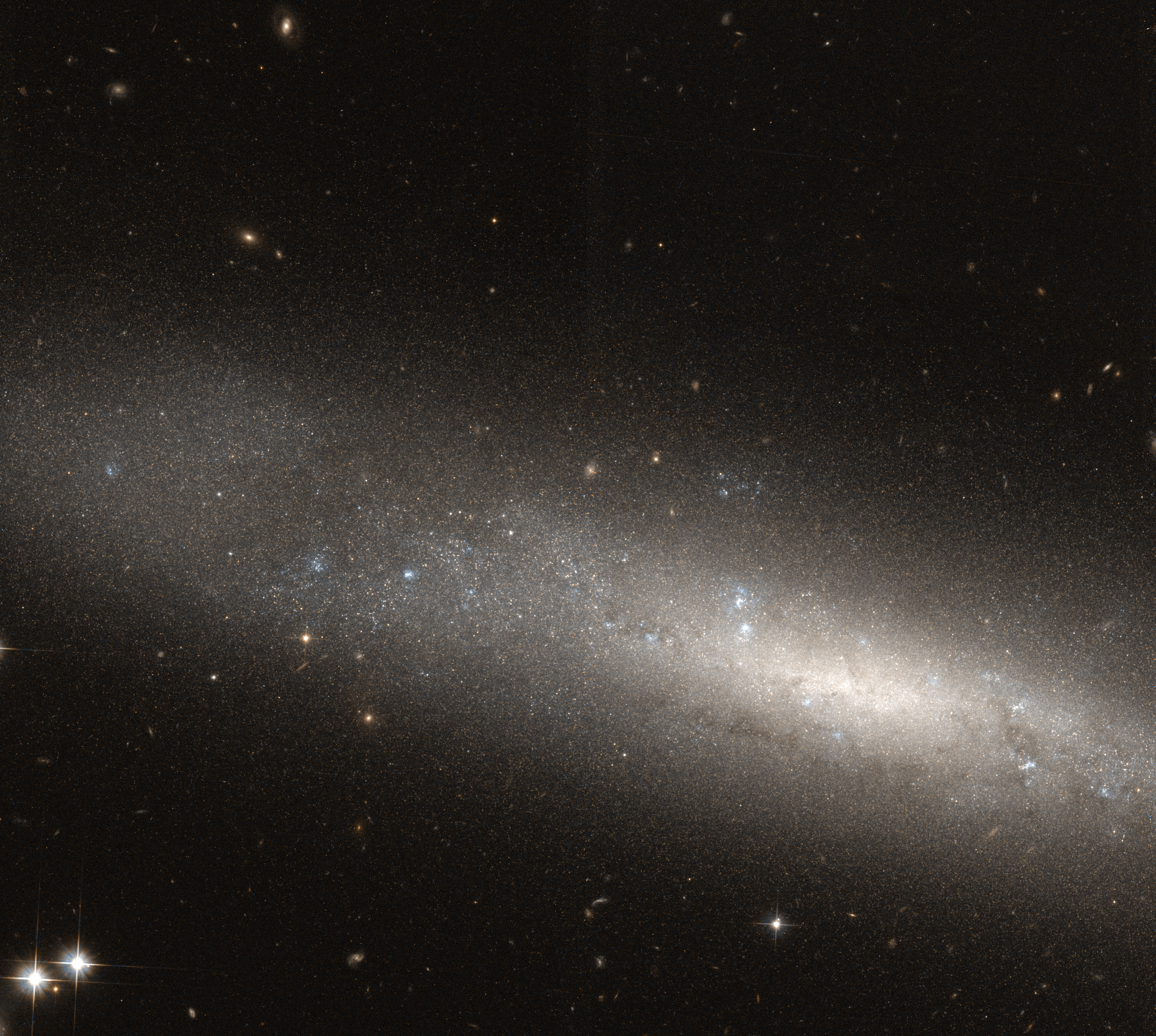
Hubble Space Telescope
