= Messier 106 =

Galaxy in the constellation Canes Venatici

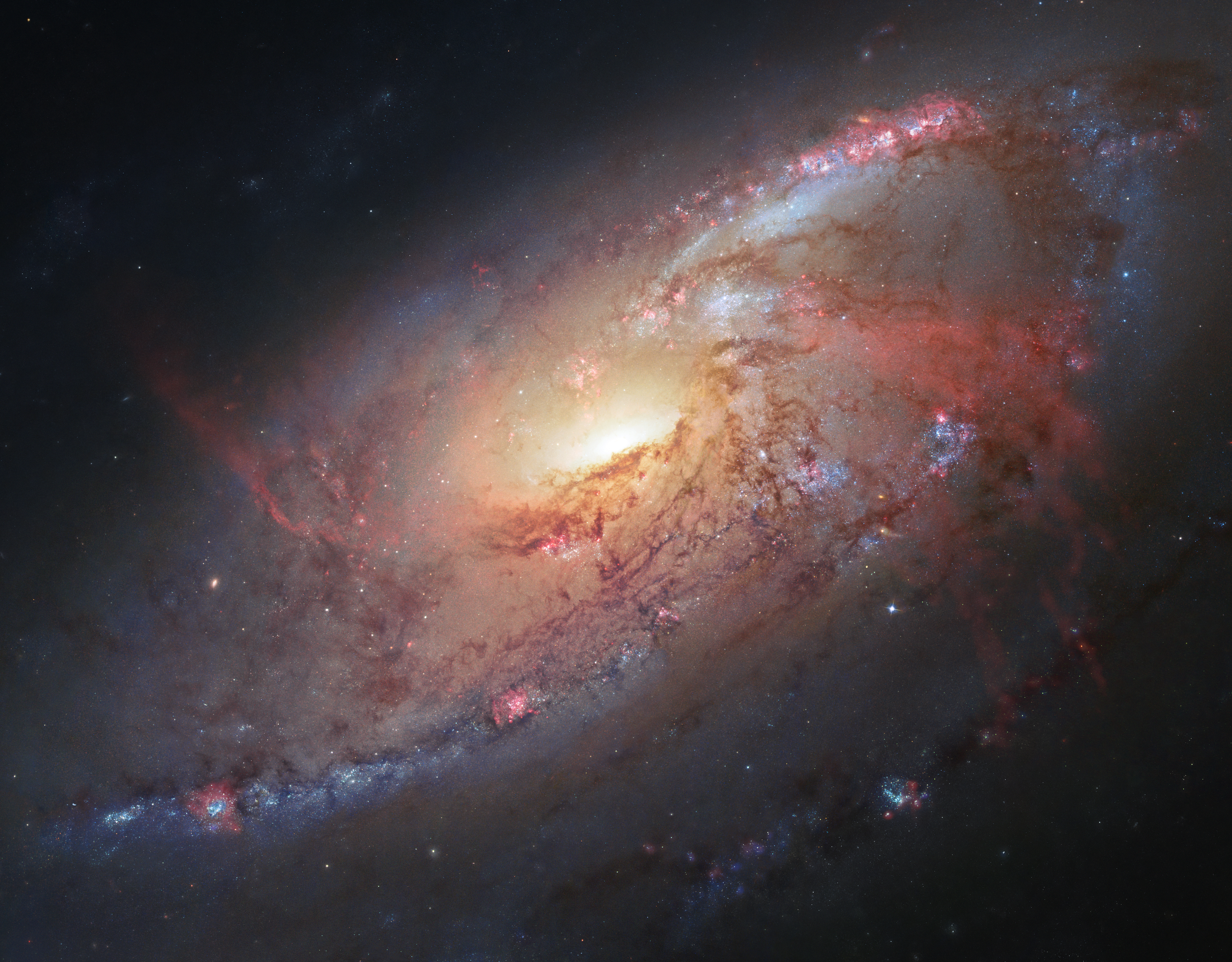
- M106 and its anomalous arms. Composite of IR (red) and optical light (Credit: NASA, ESA, the Hubble Heritage Team (STScI/AURA), and R. Gendler (for the Hubble Heritage Team))

Observation data (J2000 epoch)
- Constellation: Canes Venatici
- Right ascension: 12^{h} 18^{m} 57.5^{s}
- Declination: +47° 18′ 14″
- Redshift: 448 ± 3 km/s
- Distance: 23.7 ± 1.5 Mly (7 ± 0.5 Mpc)
- Apparent magnitude (V): 8.4

Characteristics
- Type: SAB(s)bc
- Size: 151,700 ly (46.53 kpc) (estimated)
- Apparent size (V): 18′.6 × 7′.2
- Notable features: Megamaser galaxy, Seyfert II galaxy.

Other designations
- M 106, NGC 4258, UGC 7353, PGC 39600.

Messier 106 (also known as NGC 4258) is an intermediate spiral galaxy in the constellation Canes Venatici. It was discovered by Pierre Méchain in 1781. M106 is at a distance of about 22 to 25 million light-years away from Earth. M106 contains an active nucleus classified as a Type 2 Seyfert, and the presence of a central supermassive black hole has been demonstrated from radio-wavelength observations of the rotation of a disk of molecular gas orbiting within the inner light-year around the black hole. NGC 4217 is a possible companion galaxy of Messier 106. Besides the two visible arms, it has two "anomalous arms" detectable using an X-ray telescope.

== Characteristics ==
M106 has a water vapor megamaser (the equivalent of a laser operating in the microwave spectrum of visible light and on a galactic scale) that is seen by the 22-GHz line of ortho-H_{2}O that evidences dense and warm molecular gas. Water masers are useful for observing nuclear accretion disks in active galaxies. The water masers in M106 enabled the first case of a direct measurement of the distance to a galaxy, thereby providing an independent anchor for the cosmic distance ladder. M106 has a slightly warped, thin, almost edge-on Keplerian disc which is on a subparsec scale. It surrounds a central area with mass 4×10^{7} M_{☉}.

It is one of the largest and brightest nearby galaxies, similar in size and luminosity to the Andromeda Galaxy. The supermassive black hole at the core has a mass of (3.9±0.1)×10^{7} M_{☉}.

M106 has also played an important role in calibrating the cosmic distance ladder. Before, Cepheid variables from other galaxies could not be used to measure distances since they cover ranges of metallicities different from the Milky Way's. M106 contains Cepheid variables similar to both the metallicities of the Milky Way and other galaxies' Cepheids. By measuring the distance of the Cepheids with metallicities similar to our galaxy, astronomers are able to recalibrate the other Cepheids with different metallicities, a key fundamental step in improving quantification of distances to other galaxies in the universe.

== Supernovae ==
Two supernovae have been observed in M106:

- SN 1981K (Type II, mag. 17) was reported by E. Hummel and verified by Paul Wild by examining archival photos dated 3 November 1981.
- SN 2014bc (Type II, mag. 14.8) was discovered by the PS1 Science Consortium 3Pi survey on 19 May 2014.

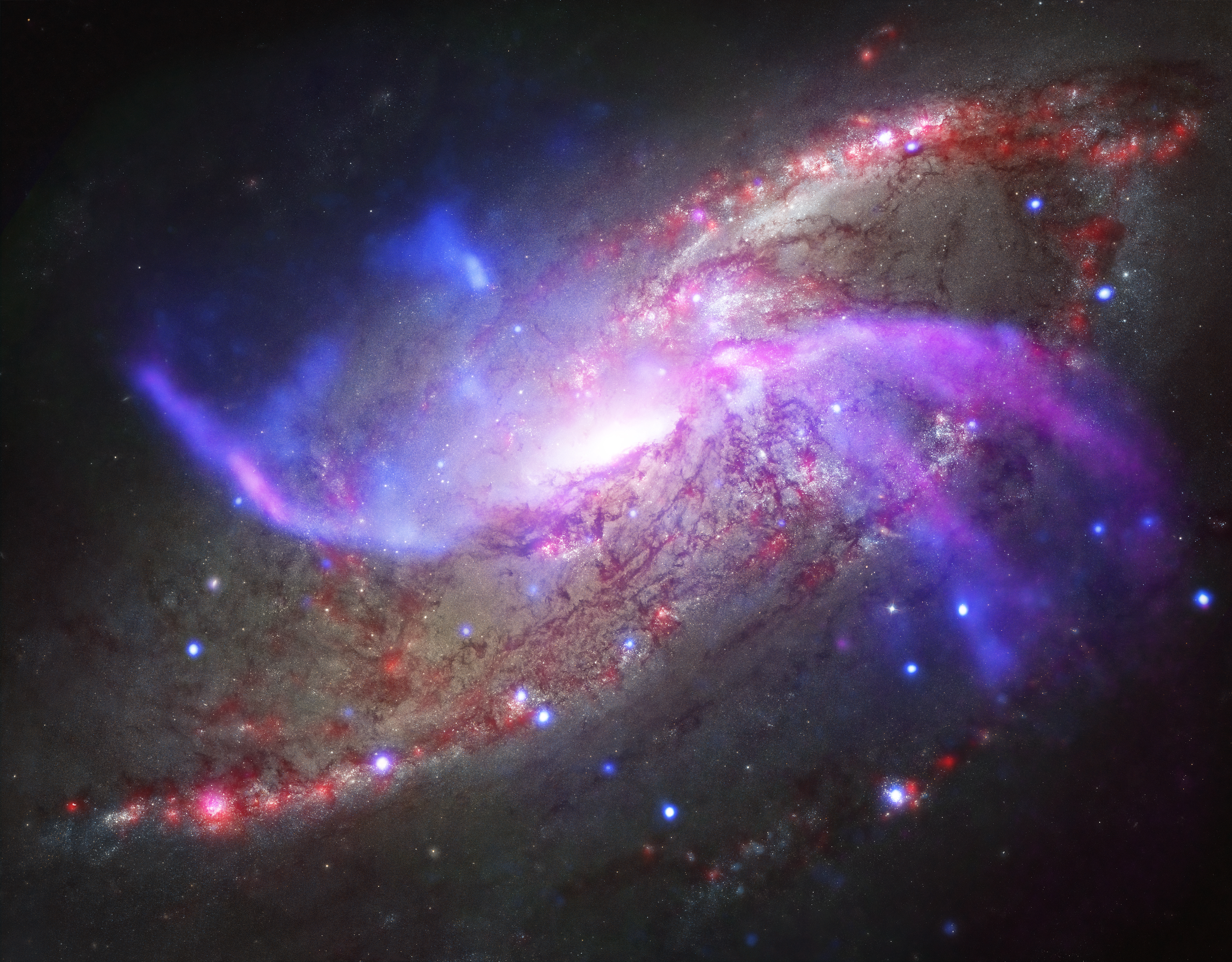
Composite image features X-rays from Chandra (blue), radio waves from the VLA (purple), optical data from Hubble (yellow and blue), and infrared with Spitzer (red). Two anomalous arms, which are not visible at optical wavelengths, appear as purple and blue emissions.

== See also ==
- List of Messier objects
- Canes II Group
