= Megamaser =

Astrophysical maser, source of stimulated spectral line emission

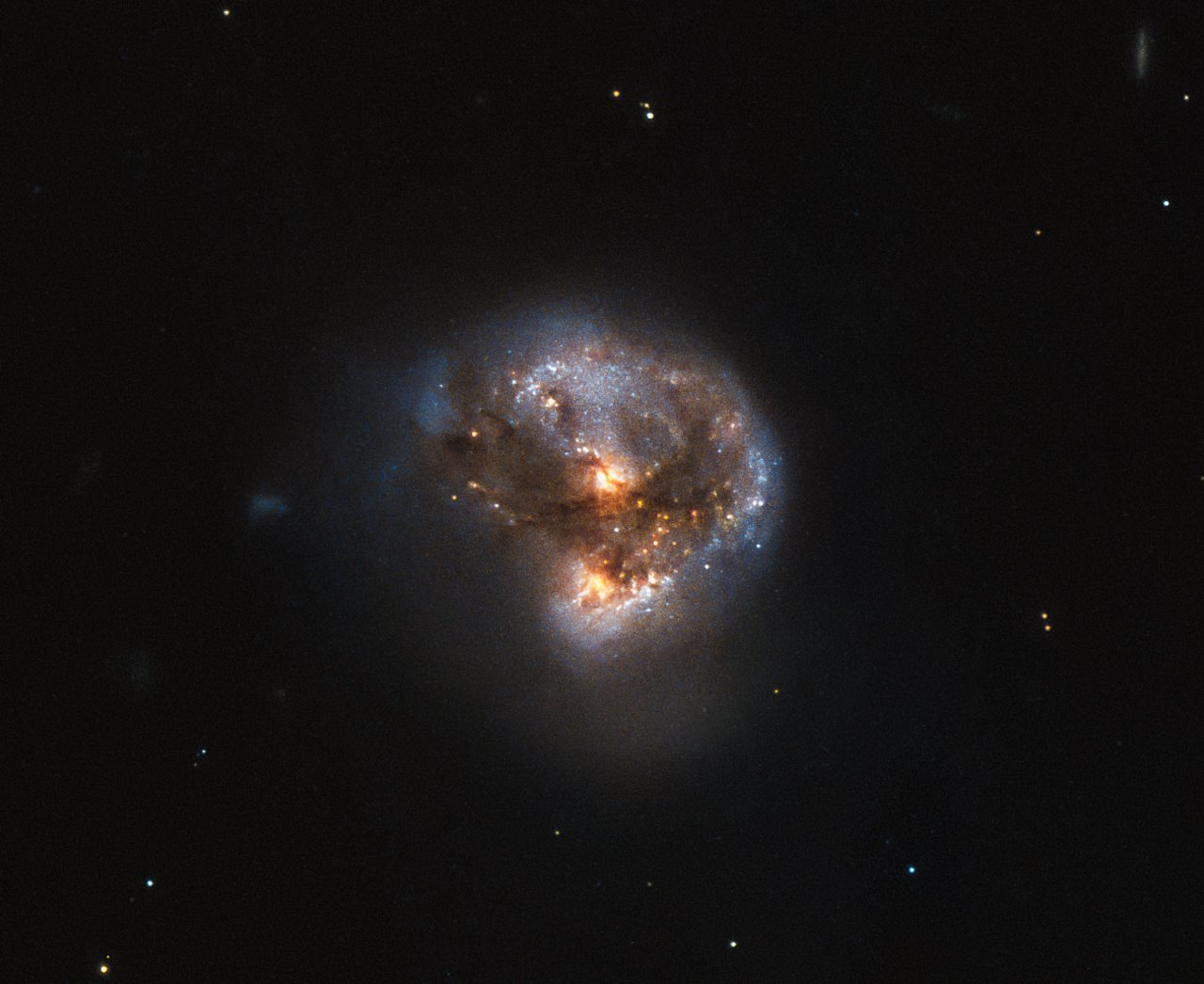
A megamaser acts as an astronomical laser that beams out microwave emission rather than visible light (hence the ‘m’ replacing the ‘l’).

A megamaser is a type of astrophysical maser, which is a naturally occurring source of stimulated spectral line emission. Megamasers are distinguished from other astrophysical masers by their large isotropic luminosity. Megamasers have typical luminosities of 10^{3} solar luminosities (L_{☉}), which is 100 million times brighter than masers in the Milky Way, hence the prefix mega. Likewise, the term kilomaser is used to describe masers outside the Milky Way that have luminosities of order L_{☉}, or thousands of times stronger than the average maser in the Milky Way, gigamaser is used to describe masers billions of times stronger than the average maser in the Milky Way, and extragalactic maser encompasses all masers found outside the Milky Way. Most known extragalactic masers are megamasers, and the majority of megamasers are hydroxyl (OH) megamasers, meaning the spectral line being amplified is one due to a transition in the hydroxyl molecule. There are known megamasers for three other molecules: water (H_{2}O), formaldehyde (H_{2}CO), and methine (CH).

Water megamasers were the first type of megamaser discovered. The first water megamaser was found in 1979 in NGC 4945, a galaxy in the nearby Centaurus A/M83 Group. The first hydroxyl megamaser was found in 1982 in Arp 220, which is the nearest ultraluminous infrared galaxy to the Milky Way. All subsequent OH megamasers that have been discovered are also in luminous infrared galaxies, and there are a small number of OH kilomasers hosted in galaxies with lower infrared luminosities. Most luminous infrared galaxies have recently merged or interacted with another galaxy, and are undergoing a burst of star formation. Many of the characteristics of the emission in hydroxyl megamasers are distinct from that of hydroxyl masers within the Milky Way, including the amplification of background radiation and the ratio of hydroxyl lines at different frequencies. The population inversion in hydroxyl molecules is produced by far infrared radiation that results from absorption and re-emission of light from forming stars by surrounding interstellar dust. Zeeman splitting of hydroxyl megamaser lines may be used to measure magnetic fields in the masing regions, and this application represents the first detection of Zeeman splitting in a galaxy other than the Milky Way.

Water megamasers and kilomasers are found primarily associated with active galactic nuclei, while galactic and weaker extragalactic water masers are found in star forming regions. Despite different environments, the circumstances that produce extragalactic water masers do not seem to be very different from those that produce galactic water masers. Observations of water megamasers have been used to make accurate measurements of distances to galaxies in order to provide constraints on the Hubble constant.

== Background ==
=== Masers ===
Diagram showing the process of stimulated emission

The word maser derives from the acronym MASER, which stands for "Microwave Amplification by Stimulated Emission of Radiation". The maser is a predecessor to lasers, which operate at optical wavelengths, and is named by the replacement of "microwave" with "light". Given a system of atoms or molecules, each with different energy states, an atom or molecule may absorb a photon and move to a higher energy level, or the photon may stimulate emission of another photon of the same energy and cause a transition to a lower energy level. Producing a maser requires population inversion, which is when a system has more members in a higher energy level relative to a lower energy level. In such a situation, more photons will be produced by stimulated emission than will be absorbed. Such a system is not in thermal equilibrium, and as such requires special conditions to occur. Specifically, it must have some energy source that can pump the atoms or molecules to the excited state. Once population inversion occurs, a photon with a photon energy corresponding to the energy difference between two states can then produce stimulated emission of another photon of the same energy. The atom or molecule will drop to the lower energy level, and there will be two photons of the same energy, where before there was only one. The repetition of this process is what leads to amplification, and since all of the photons are the same energy, the light produced is monochromatic.

=== Astrophysical masers ===
Masers and lasers built on Earth and masers that occur in space both require population inversion in order to operate, but the conditions under which population inversion occurs are very different in the two cases. Masers in laboratories have systems with high densities, which limits the transitions that may be used for masing, and requires using a resonant cavity in order to bounce light back and forth many times. Astrophysical masers are at low densities, and naturally have very long path lengths. At low densities, being out of thermal equilibrium is more easily achieved because thermal equilibrium is maintained by collisions, meaning population inversion can occur. Long path lengths provide photons traveling through the medium many opportunities to stimulate emission, and produce amplification of a background source of radiation. These factors accumulate to "make interstellar space a natural environment for maser operation." Astrophysical masers may be pumped either radiatively or collisionally. In radiative pumping, infrared photons with higher energies than the maser transition photons preferentially excite atoms and molecules to the upper state in the maser in order to produce population inversion. In collisional pumping, this population inversion is instead produced by collisions that excite molecules to energy levels above that of the upper maser level, and then the molecule decays to the upper maser level by emitting photons.

== History ==
In 1965, twelve years after the first maser was built in a laboratory, a hydroxyl (OH) maser was discovered in the plane of the Milky Way. Masers of other molecules were discovered in the Milky Way in the following years, including water (H_{2}O), silicon monoxide (SiO), and methanol (CH_{3}OH). The typical isotropic luminosity for these galactic masers is 10^{−6}–10^{−3} L_{☉}. The first evidence for extragalactic masing was detection of the hydroxyl molecule in NGC 253 in 1973, and was roughly ten times more luminous than galactic masers.

In 1982, the first megamaser was discovered in the ultraluminous infrared galaxy Arp 220. The luminosity of the source, assuming it emits isotropically, is roughly 10^{3} L_{☉}. This luminosity is roughly one hundred million times stronger than the typical maser found in the Milky Way, and so the maser source in Arp 220 was called a megamaser. At this time, extragalactic water (H_{2}O) masers were already known. In 1984, water maser emission was discovered in NGC 4258 and NGC 1068 that was of comparable strength to the hydroxyl maser in Arp 220, and are as such considered water megamasers.

Over the next decade, megamasers were also discovered for formaldehyde (H_{2}CO) and methine (CH). Galactic formaldehyde masers are relatively rare, and more formaldehyde megamasers are known than are galactic formaldehyde masers. Methine masers, on the other hand, are quite common in the Milky Way. Both types of megamaser were found in galaxies in which hydroxyl had been detected. Methine is seen in galaxies with hydroxyl absorption, while formaldehyde is found in galaxies with hydroxyl absorption as well as those with hydroxyl megamaser emission.

As of 2007, 109 hydroxyl megamaser sources were known, up to a redshift of $z \approx 0.27$. Over 100 extragalactic water masers are known, and of these, 65 are bright enough to be considered megamasers.

== General requirements ==
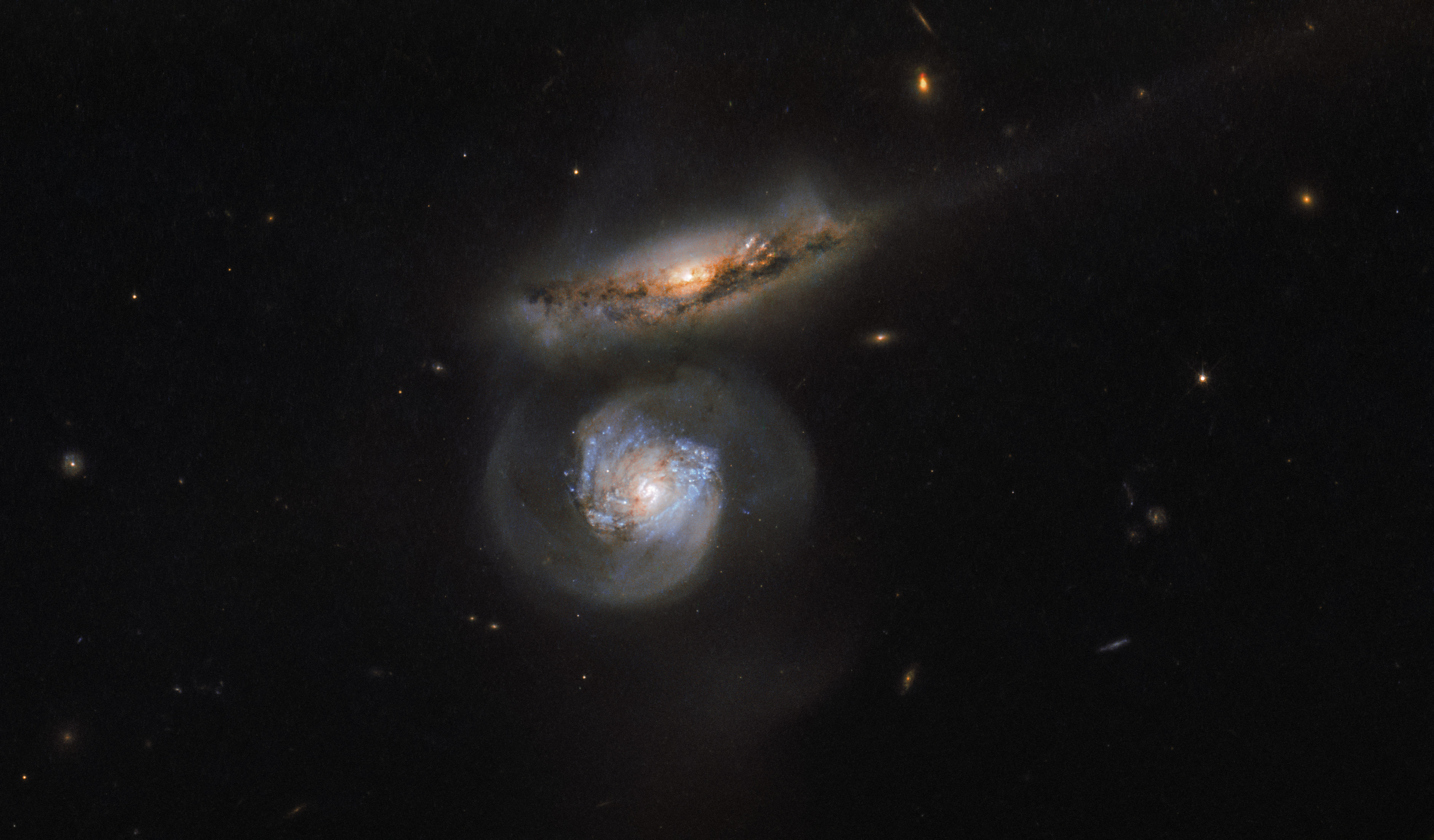
Galaxies MCG+01-38-004 (upper) and MCG+01-38-005 (lower) – the microwave emissions from MCG+01-38-005 were used to calculate a refined value for the Hubble constant.

Regardless of the masing molecule, there are a few requirements that must be met for a strong maser source to exist. One requirement is a radio continuum background source to provide the radiation amplified by the maser, as all maser transitions take place at radio wavelengths. The masing molecule must have a pumping mechanism to create the population inversion, and sufficient density and path length for significant amplification to take place. These combine to constrain when and where megamaser emission for a given molecule will take place. The specific conditions for each molecule known to produce megamasers are different, as exemplified by the fact that there is no known galaxy that hosts both of the two most common megamaser species, hydroxyl and water. As such, the different molecules with known megamasers will be addressed individually.

== Hydroxyl megamasers ==
Arp 220 hosts the first megamaser discovered, is the nearest ultraluminous infrared galaxy, and has been studied in great detail at many wavelengths. For this reason, it is the prototype of hydroxyl megamaser host galaxies, and is often used as a guide for interpreting other hydroxyl megamasers and their hosts.

=== Hosts and environment ===
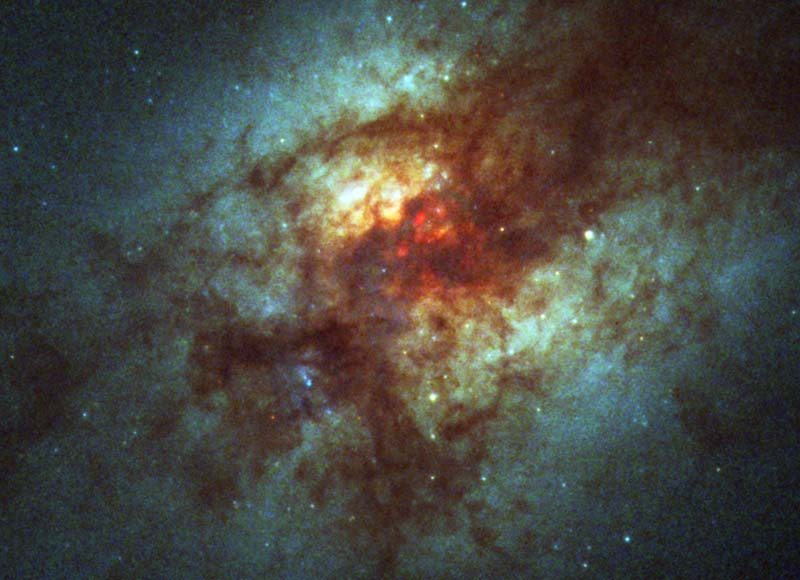
Arp 220, the prototypical hydroxyl megamaser host galaxy (Hubble Space Telescope)

Hydroxyl megamasers are found in the nuclear region of a class of galaxies called luminous infrared galaxies (LIRGs), with far-infrared luminosities in excess of one hundred billion solar luminosities, or L_{FIR} > 10^{11} L_{☉}, and ultra-luminous infrared galaxies (ULIRGs), with L_{FIR} > 10^{12} L_{☉} are favored. These infrared luminosities are very large, but in many cases LIRGs are not particularly luminous in visible light. For instance, the ratio of infrared luminosity to luminosity in blue light is roughly 80 for Arp 220, the first source in which a megamaser was observed.

The majority of the LIRGs show evidence of interaction with other galaxies or having recently experienced a galaxy merger, and the same holds true for the LIRGs that host hydroxyl megamasers. Megamaser hosts are rich in molecular gas compared to spiral galaxies, with molecular hydrogen masses in excess of one billion solar masses, or H_{2} > 10^{9} M_{☉}. Mergers help funnel molecular gas to the nuclear region of the LIRG, producing high molecular densities and stimulating high star formation rates characteristic of LIRGs. The starlight in turn heats dust, which re-radiates in the far infrared and produces the high L_{FIR} observed in hydroxyl megamaser hosts. The dust temperatures derived from far-infrared fluxes are warm relative to spirals, ranging from 40–90 K.

The far-infrared luminosity and dust temperature of a LIRG both affect the likelihood of hosting a hydroxyl megamaser, through correlations between the dust temperature and far-infrared luminosity, so it is unclear from observations alone what the role of each is in producing hydroxyl megamasers. LIRGs with warmer dust are more likely to host hydroxyl megamasers, as are ULIRGs, with L_{FIR} > 10^{12} L_{☉}. At least one out of three ULIRGs hosts a hydroxyl megamaser, as compared with roughly one out of six LIRGs. Early observations of hydroxyl megamasers indicated a correlation between the isotropic hydroxyl luminosity and far-infrared luminosity, with L_{OH} $\propto$ L_{FIR}^{2}. As more hydroxyl megamasers were discovered, and care was taken to account for the Malmquist bias, this observed relationship was found to be flatter, with L_{OH} $\propto$ L_{FIR}^{1.2$\pm$0.1}.

Early spectral classification of the nuclei of the LIRGs that host hydroxyl megamasers indicated that the properties of LIRGs that host hydroxyl megamasers cannot be distinguished from the overall population of LIRGs. Roughly one third of megamaser hosts are classified as starburst galaxies, one quarter are classified as Seyfert 2 galaxies, and the remainder are classified as low-ionization nuclear emission-line regions, or LINERs. The optical properties of hydroxyl megamaser hosts and non-hosts are not significantly different. Recent infrared observations using the Spitzer Space Telescope are, however, able to distinguish hydroxyl megamaser hosts galaxies from non-masing LIRGs, as 10–25% of hydroxyl megamaser hosts show evidence for an active galactic nucleus, compared to 50–95% for non-masing LIRGs.

The LIRGs that host hydroxyl megamasers may be distinguished from the general population of LIRGs by their molecular gas content. The majority of molecular gas is molecular hydrogen, and typical hydroxyl megamaser hosts have molecular gas densities greater than 1000 cm^{−3}. These densities are among the highest mean densities of molecular gas among LIRGs. The LIRGs that host hydroxyl megamasers also have high fractions of dense gas relative to typical LIRGs. The dense gas fraction is measured by the ratio of the luminosity produced by hydrogen cyanide (HCN) relative to the luminosity of carbon monoxide (CO).

=== Line characteristics ===
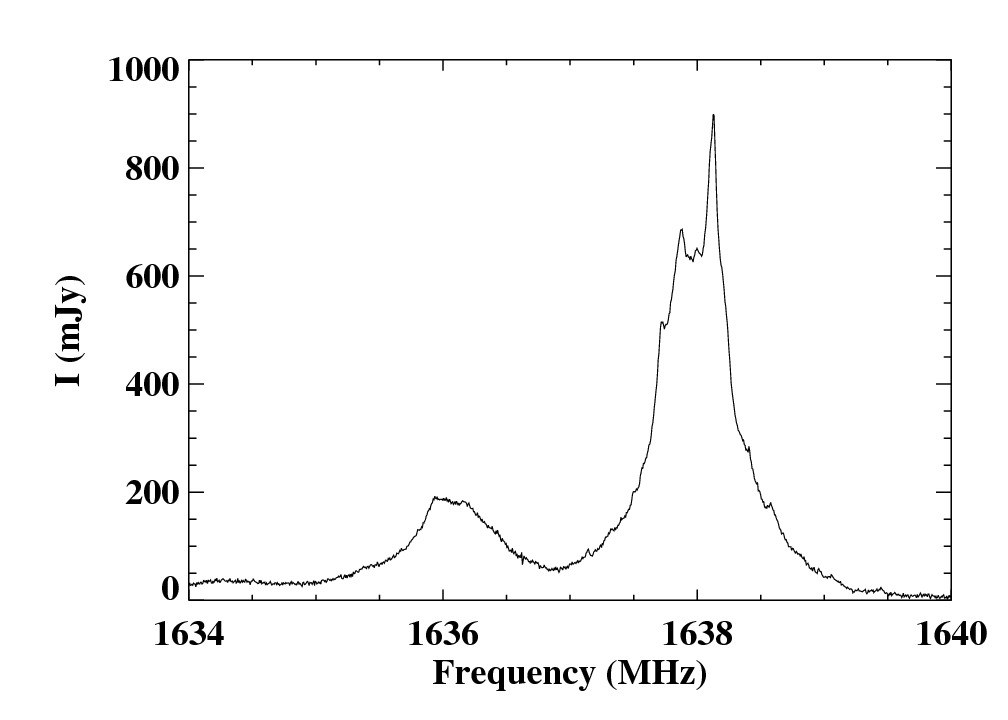
The 1665 and 1667 MHz maser lines in Arp 220, which have been redshifted to lower frequencies (Arecibo Observatory data)

The emission of hydroxyl megamasers occurs predominantly in the so-called "main lines" at 1665 and 1667 MHz. The hydroxyl molecule also has two "satellite lines" that emit at 1612 and 1720 MHz, but few hydroxyl megamasers have had satellite lines detected. Emission in all known hydroxyl megamasers is stronger in the 1667 MHz line; typical ratios of the flux in the 1667 MHz line to the 1665 MHz line, called the hyperfine ratio, range from a minimum of 2 to greater than 20. For hydroxyl emitting in thermodynamic equilibrium, this ratio will range from 1.8 to 1, depending upon the optical depth, so line ratios greater than 2 are indicative of a population out of thermal equilibrium. This may be compared with galactic hydroxyl masers in star-forming regions, where the 1665 MHz line is typically strongest, and hydroxyl masers around evolved stars, in which the 1612 MHz line is often strongest, and of the main lines, 1667 MHz emission is frequently stronger than 1612 MHz. The total width of emission at a given frequency is typically many hundreds of kilometers per second, and individual features that make up the total emission profile have widths ranging from tens to hundreds of kilometers per second. These may also be compared with galactic hydroxyl masers, which typically have linewidths of order a kilometer per second or narrower, and are spread over a velocity of a few to tens of kilometers per second.

The radiation amplified by hydroxyl masers is the radio continuum of its host. This continuum is primarily composed of synchrotron radiation produced by Type II supernovae. Amplification of this background is low, with amplification factors, or gains, ranging from a few percent to a few hundred percent, and sources with larger hyperfine ratios typically exhibiting larger gains. Sources with higher gains typically have narrower emission lines. This is expected if the pre-gain linewidths are all roughly the same, as line centers are amplified more than the wings, leading to line narrowing.

A few hydroxyl megamasers, including Arp 220, have been observed with very long baseline interferometry (VLBI), which allows sources to be studied at higher angular resolution. VLBI observations indicate that hydroxyl megamaser emission is composed of two components, one diffuse and one compact. The diffuse component displays gains of less than a factor of one and linewidths of order hundreds of kilometers per second. These characteristics are similar to those seen with single dish observations of hydroxyl megamasers that are unable to resolve individual masing components. The compact components have high gains, ranging from tens to hundreds, high ratios of flux at 1667 MHz to flux at 1665 MHz, and linewidths are of order a few kilometers per second. These general features have been explained by a narrow circumnuclear ring of material from which the diffuse emission arises, and individual masing clouds with sizes of order one parsec that give rise to the compact emission. The hydroxyl masers observed in the Milky Way more closely resemble the compact hydroxyl megamaser components. There are, however, some regions of extended galactic maser emission from other molecules that resemble the diffuse component of hydroxyl megamasers.

=== Pumping mechanism ===
The observed relationship between the luminosity of the hydroxyl line and the far infrared suggests that hydroxyl megamasers are radiatively pumped. Initial VLBI measurements of nearby hydroxyl megamasers seemed to present a problem with this model for compact emission components of hydroxyl megamasers, as they required a very high fraction of infrared photons to be absorbed by hydroxyl and lead to a maser photon being emitted, making collisional excitation a more plausible pumping mechanism. However, a model of maser emission with a clumpy masing medium appear to be able to reproduce the observed properties of compact and diffuse hydroxyl emission. A recent detailed treatment finds that photons with a wavelength of 53 micrometres are the primary pump for main line maser emission, and applies to all hydroxyl masers. In order to provide enough photons at this wavelength, the interstellar dust that reprocesses stellar radiation to infrared wavelengths must have a temperature of at least 45 kelvins. Recent observations with the Spitzer Space Telescope confirm this basic picture, but there are still some discrepancies between details of the model and observations of hydroxyl megamaser host galaxies such as the required dust opacity for megamaser emission.

=== Applications ===
Hydroxyl megamasers occur in the nuclear regions of LIRGs, and appear to be a marker in the stage of the formation of galaxies. As hydroxyl emission is not subject to extinction by interstellar dust in its host LIRG, hydroxyl masers may be useful probes of the conditions where star formation in LIRGs takes place. At redshifts of z ~ 2, there are LIRG-like galaxies more luminous than the ones in the nearby universe. The observed relationship between the hydroxyl luminosity and far-infrared luminosity suggests that hydroxyl megamasers in such galaxies may be tens to hundreds of times more luminous than observed hydroxyl megamasers. Detection of hydroxyl megamasers in such galaxies would allow precise determination of the redshift, and aid understanding of star formation in these objects.

The first detection of the Zeeman effect in another galaxy was made through observations of hydroxyl megamasers. The Zeeman effect is the splitting of a spectral line due to the presence of a magnetic field, and the size of the splitting is linearly proportional to the line-of-sight magnetic field strength. Zeeman splitting has been detected in five hydroxyl megamasers, and the typical strength of a detected field is of order a few milligauss, similar to the field strengths measured in galactic hydroxyl masers.

== Water megamasers ==
Whereas hydroxyl megamasers seem to be fundamentally distinct in some ways from galactic hydroxyl masers, water megamasers do not seem to require conditions too dissimilar from galactic water masers. Water masers stronger than galactic water masers, some of which are strong enough to be classified "mega" masers, may be described by the same luminosity function as galactic water masers. Some extragalactic water masers occur in star forming regions, like galactic water masers, while stronger water masers are found in the circumnuclear regions around active galactic nuclei (AGN). The isotropic luminosities of these span a range of order one to a few hundred L_{☉}, and are found in nearby galaxies like Messier 51 (0.8 L_{☉}) and more distant galaxies like NGC 4258 (120 L_{☉}).

=== Line characteristics and pumping mechanism ===
Water maser emission is observed primarily at 22 GHz, due to a transition between rotational energy levels in the water molecule. The upper state is at an energy corresponding to 643 kelvins about the ground state, and populating this upper maser level requires number densities of molecular hydrogen of order 10^{8} cm^{−3} or greater and temperatures of at least 300 kelvins. The water molecule comes into thermal equilibrium at molecular hydrogen number densities of roughly 10^{11} cm^{−3}, so this places an upper limit on the number density in a water masing region. Water masers emission has been successfully modelled by masers occurring behind shock waves propagating through dense regions in the interstellar medium. These shocks produce the high number densities and temperatures (relative to typical conditions in the interstellar medium) required for maser emission, and are successful in explaining observed masers.

=== Applications ===
Water megamasers may be used to provide accurate distance determinations to distant galaxies. Assuming a Keplerian orbit, measuring the centripetal acceleration and velocity of water maser spots yields the physical diameter subtended by the maser spots. By then comparing the physical radius to the angular diameter measured on the sky, the distance to the maser may be determined. This method is effective with water megamasers because they occur in a small region around an AGN, and have narrow linewidths. This method of measuring distances is being used to provide an independent measure of the Hubble constant that does not rely upon use of standard candles. The method is limited, however, by the small number of water megamasers known at distances within the Hubble flow. This distance measurement also provides a measurement of the mass of the central object, which in this case is a supermassive black hole. Black hole mass measurements using water megamasers is the most accurate method of mass determination for black holes in galaxies other than the Milky Way. The black hole masses that are measured are consistent with the M–sigma relation, an empirical correlation between stellar velocity dispersion in galactic bulges and the mass of the central supermassive black hole.
