= List of NGC objects (5001–6000) =

This is a list of NGC objects 5001–6000 from the New General Catalogue (NGC). The astronomical catalogue is composed mainly of star clusters, nebulae, and galaxies. Other objects in the catalogue can be found in the other subpages of the list of NGC objects.

The constellation information in these tables is taken from The Complete New General Catalogue and Index Catalogue of Nebulae and Star Clusters by J. L. E. Dreyer, which was accessed using the "VizieR Service". Galaxy types are identified using the NASA/IPAC Extragalactic Database. The other data of these tables are from the SIMBAD Astronomical Database unless otherwise stated.

== 5001–5100 ==
NGC number	Other names	Object type	Constellation	Right ascension (J2000)	Declination (J2000)	Apparent magnitude
5001		Spiral galaxy	Ursa Major	13^{h} 09^{m} 33.5^{s}	+53° 29′ 38″	14.6
5002		Irregular galaxy	Canes Venatici	13^{h} 10^{m} 38.3^{s}	+36° 38′ 03″	14.7
5003		Spiral galaxy	Canes Venatici	13^{h} 08^{m} 37.9^{s}	+43° 44′ 15″	15.3
5004		Lenticular galaxy	Coma Berenices	13^{h} 11^{m} 01.7^{s}	+29° 38′ 11″	14.3
5005	Caldwell 29	Spiral galaxy	Canes Venatici	13^{h} 10^{m} 56.3^{s}	+37° 03′ 30″	10.6
5006		Lenticular galaxy	Virgo	13^{h} 11^{m} 46^{s}	−19° 15′ 41″	12.4
5007		Elliptical galaxy	Ursa Major	13^{h} 9^{m} 4^{s}	62° 10′ 31″	13.3
5008	IC 4381	Barred spiral galaxy	Boötes	14^{h} 10^{m} 57^{s}	25° 29′ 47″	13.4
5009		Barred spiral galaxy	Canes Venatici	13^{h} 10^{m} 47^{s}	50° 5′ 35″	14.5
5010		Lenticular galaxy	Virgo	13^{h} 12^{m} 26.4^{s}	−15° 47′ 52″	14.4
5011		Elliptical galaxy	Centaurus	13^{h} 12^{m} 51.848^{s}	−43° 05′ 46.25″	11.33
5012		Intermediate spiral galaxy	Coma Berenices	13^{h} 11^{m} 37.0480^{s}	+22° 54′ 56.219″	12.8g
5018		Elliptical galaxy	Virgo	13^{h} 13^{m} 01.000^{s}	−19° 31′ 05.87″	11.71
5020		Barred spiral galaxy	Virgo	13^{h} 12^{m} 39.8542^{s}	+12° 35′ 59.273″	12.5
5023		Spiral galaxy	Canes Venatici	13^{h} 12^{m} 11.8^{s}	+44° 02′ 17″	12.82
5024	Messier 53	Globular cluster	Coma Berenices	13^{h} 12^{m} 55.3^{s}	+18° 10′ 09″	9.0
5026		Barred spiral galaxy or lenticular galaxy	Centaurus	13^{h} 14^{m} 13.656^{s}	−42° 57′ 40.45″	13.42
5030		Barred spiral galaxy	Virgo	13^{h} 13^{m} 54.144^{s}	−16° 29′ 27.43″	14.2
5032		Barred spiral galaxy	Coma Berenices	13^{h} 13^{m} 26.9488^{s}	+27° 48′ 08.56″	12.8
5033		Spiral galaxy	Canes Venatici	13^{h} 13^{m} 27.6^{s}	+36° 35′ 37″	10.9
5034		Spiral galaxy	Ursa Minor	13^{h} 12^{m} 19.01200^{s}	+70° 38′ 57.5408″	14.06
5042		Intermediate spiral galaxy	Hydra	13^{h} 15^{m} 31.1269^{s}	−23° 59′ 00.958″	11.8
5050		Lenticular galaxy	Virgo	13^{h} 15^{m} 41^{s}	+02° 52′ 44″	
5053		Globular cluster	Coma Berenices	13^{h} 16^{m} 27.09^{s}	+17° 42′ 00.9″	9.96
5054		Spiral galaxy	Virgo	13^{h} 16^{m} 58.4407^{s}	−16° 38′ 04.429″	10.9
5055	Messier 63; Sunflower Galaxy	Spiral galaxy	Canes Venatici	13^{h} 15^{m} 49.3^{s}	+42° 01′ 47″	9.7
5056		Spiral galaxy	Coma Berenices	13^{h} 16^{m} 12.3527^{s}	+30° 57′ 01.239″	13.7
5061		Elliptical galaxy	Hydra	13^{h} 18^{m} 05.1444^{s}	−26° 50′ 14.149″	11.44
5064		Spiral galaxy	Centaurus	13^{h} 20^{m} 31^{s}	−48° 02′ 33″	
5068		Spiral galaxy	Virgo	13^{h} 18^{m} 55.2^{s}	−21° 02′ 21″	10.5
5078		Spiral galaxy	Hydra	13^{h} 19^{m} 50.2^{s}	−27° 24′ 35″	11.5
5082		Lenticular galaxy	Centaurus	13^{h} 20^{m} 40.0345^{s}	−43° 41′ 59.799″	13.75
5084		Lenticular galaxy	Virgo	13^{h} 20^{m} 16.9^{s}	−21° 49′ 39″	10.5
5085		Barred spiral galaxy	Hydra	13^{h} 20^{m} 17.7702^{s}	−24° 26′ 22.929″	11.7
5087		Elliptical galaxy	Virgo	13^{h} 20^{m} 25.2^{s}	−20° 36′ 37″	13
5090		Elliptical galaxy	Centaurus	13^{h} 21^{m} 12.8^{s}	−43° 42′ 16″	12.6
5091		Spiral galaxy	Centaurus	13^{h} 21^{m} 18.5^{s}	−43° 43′ 19″	14.5
5098		Galaxy pair	Canes Venatici	13^{h} 20^{m} 16.2^{s}	+33° 08′ 39″	15.0
5100		Interacting galaxy	Virgo	13^{h} 21^{m} 00.6^{s}	+08° 58′ 40″	15.1

== 5101–5200 ==
NGC number	Other names	Object type	Constellation	Right ascension (J2000)	Declination (J2000)	Apparent magnitude
5101		Spiral galaxy	Hydra	13^{h} 21^{m} 46.6^{s}	−27° 25′ 53″	11.5
5102		Lenticular galaxy	Centaurus	13^{h} 21^{m} 57.8^{s}	−36° 37′ 47″	10.4
5112		Spiral galaxy	Canes Venatici	13^{h} 21^{m} 56.7^{s}	+38° 44′ 07″	12.5
5114		Lenticular galaxy	Centaurus	13^{h} 24^{m} 01.7^{s}	−32° 20′ 38″	13.45
5121		Unbarred spiral galaxy	Centaurus	13^{h} 24^{m} 45.6245^{s}	−37° 40′ 55.852″	10.7
5123		Spiral galaxy	Canes Venatici	13^{h} 23^{m} 10.5284^{s}	+43° 05′ 10.750″	13.6g
5127		Elliptical galaxy	Canes Venatici	13^{h} 23^{m} 45.0294^{s}	+31° 33′ 56.870″	13.3g
5128	Centaurus A Caldwell 77	Lenticular galaxy	Centaurus	13^{h} 25^{m} 27.6^{s}	−43° 01′ 09″	8.0
5134		Spiral galaxy	Virgo	13^{h} 25^{m} 18.5378^{s}	−21° 08′ 03.086″	12.83
5135		Barred spiral galaxy	Hydra	13^{h} 25^{m} 44.1^{s}	−29° 50′ 01″	12.9
5139	Omega Centauri	Globular cluster	Centaurus	13^{h} 26^{m} 45.9^{s}	−47° 28′ 37″	6.1
5144		Unbarred spiral galaxy	Ursa Minor	13^{h} 23^{m} 07^{s}	70° 27′ 43″	13.1
5161		Spiral galaxy	Centaurus	13^{h} 29^{m} 14.0^{s}	−33° 10′ 30″	12.0
5162		Spiral galaxy	Virgo	13^{h} 29^{m} 25.9296^{s}	+11° 00′ 28.534″	13.0
5164		Spiral galaxy	Ursa Major	13^{h} 27^{m} 12.1^{s}	+55° 29′ 13″	14.6
5170		Spiral galaxy	Virgo	13^{h} 29^{m} 48.9^{s}	−17° 57′ 59″	11.9
5172		Intermediate spiral galaxy	Coma Berenices	12^{h} 29^{m} 19.3104^{s}	+17° 03′ 06.901″	12.63
5174	(Duplicate of NGC 5162)	Spiral galaxy	Virgo	13^{h} 29^{m} 25.9296^{s}	+11° 00′ 28.534″	13.0
5177		Lenticular galaxy	Virgo	13^{h} 29^{m} 24.2^{s}	+11° 47′ 49″	15.1g
5185		Spiral galaxy	Virgo	13^{h} 30^{m} 02.2642^{s}	+13° 24′ 57.757″	14.3g
5189	Gum 47	Planetary nebula	Musca	13^{h} 33^{m} 33.0^{s}	−65° 58′ 27″	14.1
5191		Lenticular galaxy	Virgo	13^{h} 30^{m} 47.4^{s}	+11° 12′ 03″	14.1
5194	Messier 51a Whirlpool Galaxy	Spiral galaxy	Canes Venatici	13^{h} 29^{m} 52.4^{s}	+47° 11′ 41″	8.8
5195	Messier 51b	Interacting galaxy	Canes Venatici	13^{h} 29^{m} 59.2^{s}	+47° 16′ 05″	10.6
5198		Elliptical galaxy	Canes Venatici	13^{h} 30^{m} 11.411^{s}	+46° 40′ 14.99″	11.78

== 5201–5300 ==
NGC number	Other names	Object type	Constellation	Right ascension (J2000)	Declination (J2000)	Apparent magnitude
5201		Spiral galaxy	Ursa Major	13^{h} 29^{m} 16.212^{s}	+53° 04′ 55.14″	
5204		Magellanic spiral galaxy	Ursa Major	13^{h} 29^{m} 36.5^{s}	+58° 25′ 07″	11.73
5206		Dwarf elliptical galaxy	Centaurus	13^{h} 35^{m} 17^{s}	−48° 16′ 52″	
5221		Spiral galaxy	Virgo	13^{h} 34^{m} 55.9030^{s}	+13° 49′ 57.055″	13.80
5223		Elliptical galaxy	Canes Venatici	13^{h} 34^{m} 25.243^{s}	+34° 41′ 25.53″	14.4
5229		Spiral galaxy	Canes Venatici	13^{h} 34^{m} 02.9^{s}	+44° 02′ 17″	14.3
5230		Spiral galaxy	Virgo	13^{h} 35^{m} 31.8833^{s}	+13° 40′ 34.263″	12.77
5235		Barred spiral galaxy	Virgo	13^{h} 36^{m} 01.4057^{s}	+06° 35′ 07.272″	14.2
5236	Messier 83; Southern Pinwheel Galaxy	Spiral galaxy	Hydra	13^{h} 37^{m} 00.8^{s}	−29° 51′ 59″	8.5
5238		Irregular galaxy	Canes Venatici	13^{h} 34^{m} 43.8^{s}	+51° 36′ 33″	64.4
5247		Spiral galaxy	Virgo	13^{h} 38^{m} 02.6^{s}	−17° 53′ 01″	11
5251		Barred spiral galaxy	Boötes	13^{h} 37^{m} 24.8276^{s}	+27° 25′ 09.163″	13.9
5252		Lenticular galaxy	Virgo	13^{h} 38^{m} 15.9^{s}	+04° 32′ 33″	13.8
5253		Irregular galaxy	Centaurus	13^{h} 39^{m} 55.9^{s}	−31° 38′ 24″	11.0
5256		Disk galaxy	Ursa Major	13^{h} 38^{m} 17.5^{s}	+48° 16′ 37″	12.69
5257		Interacting galaxy	Virgo	13^{h} 39^{m} 52.3^{s}	+00° 50′ 22″	12.9
5258		Interacting galaxy	Virgo	13^{h} 39^{m} 57.7^{s}	+00° 49′ 51″	12.9
5260		Barred spiral galaxy	Hydra	13^{h} 40^{m} 19.9^{s}	−23° 51′ 29.1″	12.8
5264	DDO 242	Irregular galaxy	Hydra	13^{h} 41^{m} 36.683^{s}	−29° 54′ 47.25″	12.39
5266		Lenticular galaxy	Centaurus	13^{h} 43^{m} 02^{s}	−48° 10′ 09″	11.14
5272	Messier 3	Globular cluster	Canes Venatici	13^{h} 42^{m} 11.2^{s}	+28° 22′ 32″	6.2
5273		Lenticular galaxy	Canes Venatici	13^{h} 42^{m} 08.380^{s}	+35° 39′ 15.47″	11.6
5278		Interacting galaxy	Ursa Major	13^{h} 41^{m} 39.618^{s}	+55° 40′ 14.341″	13.6
5279		Interacting galaxy	Ursa Major	13^{h} 41^{m} 43.79^{s}	+55° 40′ 26.1″	
5281		Open cluster	Centaurus	13^{h} 46^{m} 35^{s}	−62° 55′ 00″	5.9
5286	Caldwell 84	Globular cluster	Centaurus	13^{h} 46^{m} 26.81^{s}	−51° 22′ 27.3″	7.6
5291		Interacting galaxy	Centaurus	13^{h} 47^{m} 24.4^{s}	−30° 24′ 28″	14.2
5300		Spiral galaxy	Virgo	13^{h} 48^{m} 16.1^{s}	+03° 57′ 02″	13.7

== 5301–5400 ==
NGC number	Other names	Object type	Constellation	Right ascension (J2000)	Declination (J2000)	Apparent magnitude
5307		Planetary nebula	Centaurus	13^{h} 51^{m} 03.3^{s}	−51° 12′ 21″	11.5
5308		Lenticular galaxy	Ursa Major	13^{h} 47^{m} 00.392^{s}	+60° 58′ 22.94″	12.5
5312		Lenticular galaxy	Canes Venatici	13^{h} 49^{m} 50.6^{s}	+33° 37′ 18″	13.9
5314		Spiral galaxy	Ursa Minor	13^{h} 46^{m} 11.4^{s}	+70° 20′ 22.4″	13.9
5315		Planetary nebula	Circinus	13^{h} 53^{m} 57.0^{s}	−66° 30′ 51″	14.6
5316		Open cluster	Centaurus	13^{h} 53^{m} 57^{s}	−61° 52′ 06″	6.0
5317	(Duplicate of NGC 5364)	Spiral galaxy	Virgo	13^{h} 56^{m} 12.1^{s}	+05° 00′ 53″	13.2
5322		Elliptical galaxy	Ursa Major	13^{h} 49^{m} 15.3^{s}	+60° 11′ 26″	10.1
5331		Interacting galaxies	Virgo	13^{h} 52^{m} 16^{s}	+02° 06′ 04″	14.3
5334		Spiral galaxy	Virgo	13^{h} 52^{m} 54.5^{s}	−01° 06′ 52″	13.7
5335		Barred spiral galaxy	Virgo	13^{h} 52^{m} 56.5582^{s}	+02° 48′ 51.305″	13.8
5343		Elliptical galaxy	Virgo	13^{h} 54^{m} 11.700^{s}	−07° 35′ 17.20″	14
5353		Lenticular galaxy	Canes Venatici	13^{h} 53^{m} 26.6971^{s}	+40° 16′ 58.984″	11.96
5361		Spiral galaxy	Canes Venatici	13^{h} 54^{m} 35.2197^{s}	+38° 26′ 58.150″	14.78
5363		Lenticular galaxy	Virgo	13^{h} 56^{m} 07.2^{s}	+05° 15′ 17″	10.5
5364	NGC 5317	Spiral galaxy	Virgo	13^{h} 56^{m} 12.1^{s}	+05° 00′ 53″	13.2
5371	NGC 5390	Spiral galaxy	Canes Venatici	13^{h} 55^{m} 40.0^{s}	+40° 27′ 43″	11.5
5374		Barred spiral galaxy	Virgo	13^{h} 57^{m} 29.6454^{s}	+06° 05′ 49.342″	13.27
5377		Barred spiral galaxy	Canes Venatici	13^{h} 56^{m} 17^{s}	+47° 14′ 08″	11.46
5378		Barred spiral galaxy	Canes Venatici	13^{h} 56^{m} 51.0361^{s}	+37° 47′ 50.188″	13.4g
5384		Lenticular galaxy	Virgo	13^{h} 58^{m} 12.850^{s}	+06° 31′ 04.80″	
5390	(Duplicate of NGC 5371)	Spiral galaxy	Canes Venatici	13^{h} 55^{m} 40.0^{s}	+40° 27′ 43″	11.5
5394		Barred spiral galaxy	Canes Venatici	13^{h} 58^{m} 33^{s}	+37° 27′ 12″	13.12
5395		Spiral galaxy	Canes Venatici	13^{h} 58^{m} 37^{s}	+37° 25′ 28″	12.48
5398		Irregular galaxy	Centaurus	14^{h} 01^{m} 21.0^{s}	−33° 03′ 42″	12.7

== 5401–5500 ==
NGC number	Other names	Object type	Constellation	Right ascension (J2000)	Declination (J2000)	Apparent magnitude
5406		Barred spiral galaxy	Canes Venatici	14^{h} 00^{m} 20.1358^{s}	+38° 54′ 55.640″	13.1g
5408		Irregular galaxy	Centaurus	14^{h} 03^{m} 21.0^{s}	−41° 22′ 44″	14.0
5410		Barred spiral galaxy	Canes Venatici	14^{h} 00^{m} 54.5858^{s}	+40° 59′ 18.532″	13.2
5416		Spiral galaxy, radio galaxy	Boötes	14^{h} 02^{m} 11.0^{s}	+09° 26′ 24″	13.6
5419		Elliptical galaxy	Centaurus	14^{h} 03^{m} 38.73^{s}	−33° 58′ 41.7″	10.8
5422		Lenticular galaxy	Ursa Major	14^{h} 00^{m} 42.063^{s}	+55° 09′ 52.12″	11.80
5442		Barred spiral galaxy	Virgo	14^{h} 04^{m} 43.1985^{s}	−09° 42′ 48.128″	14.5
5448		Spiral galaxy	Ursa Major	14^{h} 02^{m} 50.0608^{s}	+49° 10′ 21.402″	11.2
5455		Emission nebula	Ursa Major	14^{h} 03^{m} 01^{s}	+54° 14′ 29″	15.22
5457	Messier 101; Pinwheel Galaxy (Messier 102(?))	Spiral galaxy	Ursa Major	14^{h} 03^{m} 12.5^{s}	+54° 20′ 53″	8.7
5460		Open cluster	Centaurus	14^{h} 07^{m} 27^{s}	−48° 20′ 36″	5.6
5461		Emission nebula	Ursa Major	14^{h} 03^{m} 41^{s}	+54° 19′ 04″	14.38
5466		Globular cluster	Boötes	14^{h} 05^{m} 27.4^{s}	+28° 32′ 04″	10.5
5470		Spiral galaxy	Virgo	14^{h} 05^{m} 31.9^{s}	+06° 01′ 45″	13.6
5471		Emission nebula	Ursa Major	14^{h} 04^{m} 28^{s}	+54° 23′ 48″	14.54
5473		Lenticular galaxy	Ursa Major	14^{h} 04^{m} 43.22677^{s}	+54° 53′ 33.5103″	11.47
5474		Spiral galaxy	Ursa Major	14^{h} 05^{m} 01.5^{s}	+53° 39′ 45″	11.9
5477		Irregular galaxy	Ursa Major	14^{h} 05^{m} 33.1^{s}	+54° 27′ 40″	14.5
5480		Spiral galaxy	Ursa Major	14^{h} 06^{m} 21.5880^{s}	+50° 43′ 30.232″	12.8g
5483		Barred spiral galaxy	Centaurus	14^{h} 10^{m} 25.1016^{s}	−43° 19′ 27.876″	11.2
5486		Irregular galaxy	Ursa Major	14^{h} 07^{m} 25.0^{s}	+55° 06′ 12″	13.4
5490		Elliptical galaxy	Boötes	14^{h} 09^{m} 57.330^{s}	+17° 32′ 43.53″	12.9
5493		Lenticular galaxy	Virgo	14^{h} 11^{m} 29.3824^{s}	−05° 02′ 37.090″	12.27
5495		Barred spiral galaxy	Hydra	14^{h} 12^{m} 23.3522^{s}	−27° 06′ 29.777″	13.5
5500		Elliptical galaxy	Boötes	14^{h} 10^{m} 15^{s}	+48° 32′ 46″	14.0

== 5501–5600 ==
NGC number	Other names	Object type	Constellation	Right ascension (J2000)	Declination (J2000)	Apparent magnitude
5501		Unbarred spiral galaxy	Virgo	14^{h} 12^{m} 20.2^{s}	+1° 16′ 21.1″	14.9
5502	NGC 5503	Spiral galaxy	Ursa Major	14^{h} 09^{m} 33.9^{s}	60° 24′ 34.3″	15.9
5503	(Duplicate of NGC 5502)	Spiral galaxy	Ursa Major	14^{h} 09^{m} 33.9^{s}	60° 24′ 34.3″	15.9
5504		Spiral galaxy	Boötes	14^{h} 12^{m} 15.8^{s}	+15° 50′ 33″	14.0
5506		Spiral galaxy	Virgo	14^{h} 13^{m} 14.9^{s}	−03° 12′ 27″	11.9
5508		Spiral galaxy	Boötes	14^{h} 12^{m} 29.0^{s}	+24° 38′ 08″	13.8
5514		Interacting galaxies	Boötes	14^{h} 13^{m} 38.690^{s}	+07° 39′ 37.35″	14.2
5516		Lenticular galaxy	Centaurus	14^{h} 15^{m} 54.7000^{s}	−48° 06′ 53.257″	13.00
5523		Unbarred spiral galaxy	Boötes	14^{h} 14^{m} 52.31^{s}	+25° 19′ 3.41″	12.75
5529		Spiral galaxy	Boötes	14^{h} 15^{m} 34^{s}	+36° 13′ 36″	12.8
5530		Spiral galaxy	Lupus	14^{h} 18^{m} 27.30^{s}	−43° 23′ 22.0″	11.0
5532		Elliptical galaxy	Boötes	14^{h} 16^{m} 52.9^{s}	+10° 48′ 27″	12.59
5533		Unbarred spiral galaxy	Boötes	14^{h} 16^{m} 07.74475^{s}	+35° 20′ 37.7796″	11.81
5535		Elliptical galaxy	Boötes	14^{h} 17^{m} 31.27^{s}	+08° 12′ 30.22″	15.0
5539		Lenticular galaxy	Boötes	14^{h} 17^{m} 37.8^{s}	+08° 10′ 46.57″	14.2
5541		Spiral galaxy	Boötes	14^{h} 16^{m} 31.745^{s}	+39° 35′ 21.228″	12.7
5544		Barred spiral galaxy	Boötes	14^{h} 17^{m} 02.63^{s}	+36° 34′ 15.9″	14.0
5545		Spiral galaxy	Boötes	14^{h} 17^{m} 05.222^{s}	+36° 34′ 30.87″	18.5
5548		Spiral galaxy	Boötes	14^{h} 17^{m} 59.7^{s}	+25° 08′ 13″	13.1
5555		Spiral galaxy	Virgo	14^{h} 18^{m} 48.0^{s}	−19° 08′ 20.1″	15.3
5557		Elliptical galaxy	Boötes	14^{h} 18^{m} 25.708^{s}	+36° 29′ 37.28″	12.2
5559		Barred spiral galaxy	Boötes	14^{h} 19^{m} 12.792^{s}	+24° 47′ 55.01″	14.81
5562		Spiral galaxy	Boötes	14^{h} 20^{m} 11^{s}	+10° 15′ 48″	13.6
5566		Barred spiral galaxy	Virgo	14^{h} 20^{m} 19.95^{s}	+03° 56′ 00.9″	11.1
5575	NGC 5578	Lenticular galaxy	Virgo	14^{h} 20^{m} 59.374^{s}	+06° 12′ 09.54″	14.5
5578	(Duplicate of NGC 5575)	Lenticular galaxy	Virgo	14^{h} 20^{m} 59.374^{s}	+06° 12′ 09.54″	14.5
5579		Intermediate spiral galaxy	Boötes	14^{h} 20^{m} 26.484^{s}	+35° 11′ 19.66″	14.7
5582		Elliptical galaxy	Boötes	14^{h} 20^{m} 43.12^{s}	+39° 41′ 36.9″	11.61
5584		Barred spiral galaxy	Virgo	14^{h} 22^{m} 3.811^{s}	−00° 23′ 14.82″	12.80
5585		Spiral galaxy	Ursa Major	14^{h} 19^{m} 48.2^{s}	+56° 43′ 45″	11.2
5587		Spiral galaxy	Boötes	14^{h} 22^{m} 10.8^{s}	+13° 55′ 03″	14.0
5591		Spiral galaxy, peculiar	Boötes	14^{h} 22^{m} 33.3^{s}	+13° 43′ 02″	14.0
5597		Intermediate spiral galaxy	Libra	14^{h} 24^{m} 27.4115^{s}	−16° 45′ 46.598″	12.60
5598		Lenticular galaxy	Boötes	14^{h} 22^{m} 28.3^{s}	+40° 19′ 11″	13.0
5600		Spiral galaxy	Boötes	14^{h} 23^{m} 49.5^{s}	+14° 38′ 21″	12.7

== 5601–5700 ==
NGC number	Other names	Object type	Constellation	Right ascension (J2000)	Declination (J2000)	Apparent magnitude
5600		Spiral galaxy	Boötes	14^{h} 23^{m} 49.5^{s}	+14° 38′ 19″	12.1
5601		Lenticular galaxy	Boötes	14^{h} 22^{m} 53.20^{s}	+40° 18′ 34.0″	14.7
5605		Intermediate spiral galaxy	Libra	14^{h} 25^{m} 07.57^{s}	−13° 09′ 46.8″	12.3
5609		Spiral galaxy	Boötes	14^{h} 23^{m} 48.3^{s}	+34° 50′ 34″	15.7
5612		Spiral galaxy	Apus	14^{h} 34^{m} 01.1403^{s}	−78° 23′ 15.202″	13.04
5613		Lenticular galaxy	Boötes	14^{h} 24^{m} 05.962^{s}	+34° 53′ 31.02″	15.5
5614		Spiral galaxy	Boötes	14^{h} 24^{m} 07.591^{s}	+34° 51′ 32.02″	12.6
5615		Irregular galaxy	Boötes	14^{h} 24^{m} 06.4^{s}	+34° 51′ 54″	17.8
5617		Open cluster	Centaurus	14^{h} 29^{m} 44^{s}	−60° 42′ 42″	6.3
5619	NGC 5619A	Intermediate spiral galaxy	Virgo	14^{h} 27^{m} 18.229^{s}	+04° 48′ 10.15″	13.40
5626		Lenticular galaxy	Hydra	14^{h} 29^{m} 49^{s}	−29° 44′ 54.5″	12.9
5630		Barred spiral galaxy	Boötes	14^{h} 27^{m} 36.61^{s}	+41° 15′ 27.9″	13.0
5634		Globular cluster	Virgo	14^{h} 29^{m} 37.28^{s}	−05° 58′ 35.1″	10.05
5640		Spiral galaxy	Camelopardalis	14^{h} 20^{m} 40.8^{s}	+80° 07′ 23.2″	14.7
5641		Barred spiral galaxy	Boötes	14^{h} 29^{m} 16.6^{s}	+28° 49′ 18.7″	13.0
5643		Intermediate spiral galaxy	Lupus	14^{h} 32^{m} 40.7^{s}	−44° 10′ 28″	10.7
5653		Spiral galaxy	Boötes	14^{h} 30^{m} 10.6^{s}	+31° 12′ 54″	12.7
5658	(Duplicate of NGC 5719)	Intermediate or barred spiral galaxy	Virgo	14^{h} 40^{m} 56.37^{s}	−00° 19′ 05.78″	0.17
5662		Open cluster	Centaurus	14^{h} 35^{m} 37^{s}	−56° 37′ 06″	5.5
5665		Spiral galaxy	Boötes	14^{h} 32^{m} 25.796^{s}	+08° 04′ 42.43″	12.7
5668		Spiral galaxy	Virgo	14^{h} 33^{m} 24.331^{s}	+04° 27′ 01.75″	
5671		Barred spiral galaxy	Ursa Minor	14^{h} 27^{m} 42.0426^{s}	+69° 41′ 38.703″	14.10
5674		Barred spiral galaxy	Virgo	14^{h} 33^{m} 52.2782^{s}	+05° 27′ 30.121″	13.70
5676		Spiral galaxy	Boötes	14^{h} 32^{m} 46.8^{s}	+49° 27′ 28″	12.3
5678		Barred spiral galaxy	Draco	14^{h} 32^{m} 05^{s}	+57° 55′ 17″	12.1
5681		Barred spiral galaxy	Boötes	14^{h} 35^{m} 42.9043^{s}	+08° 18′ 02.313″	14.3
5690		Spiral galaxy	Virgo	14^{h} 37^{m} 41.0745^{s}	+02° 17′ 27.643″	12.7g
5694	Caldwell 66	Globular cluster	Hydra	14^{h} 39^{m} 36.5^{s}	−26° 32′ 18.0″	10.2
5698		Barred spiral galaxy	Boötes	14^{h} 37^{m} 14.6972^{s}	+38° 27′ 15.553″	13.6g

== 5701–5800 ==
NGC number	Other names	Object type	Constellation	Right ascension (J2000)	Declination (J2000)	Apparent magnitude
5705		Spiral galaxy	Virgo	14^{h} 39^{m} 49.6^{s}	−00° 43′ 08″	14.5
5713		Spiral galaxy	Virgo	14^{h} 40^{m} 11.5^{s}	−00° 17′ 25″	11.7
5714		Spiral galaxy	Boötes	14^{h} 38^{m} 11.54^{s}	+46° 38′ 18.09″	14.2
5716		Barred spiral galaxy	Libra	14^{h} 41^{m} 05.5473^{s}	−17° 28′ 37.177″	13.25
5719	NGC 5658	Intermediate or barred spiral galaxy	Virgo	14^{h} 40^{m} 56.37^{s}	−00° 19′ 05.78″	12.8g
5722		Lenticular galaxy	Boötes	14^{h} 38^{m} 54.4118^{s}	+46° 39′ 56.299″	15.0g
5728		Barred spiral galaxy	Libra	14^{h} 42^{m} 23.89^{s}	−17° 15′ 11.09″	13.4
5735		Barred spiral galaxy	Boötes	14^{h} 42^{m} 33.2479^{s}	+28° 43′ 35.420″	13.1
5746		Barred spiral galaxy	Virgo	14^{h} 44^{m} 55.9^{s}	+01° 57′ 18″	11.0
5749		Open cluster	Lupus	14^{h} 48^{m} 54^{s}	−54° 29′ 52″	8.8
5750		Spiral galaxy	Virgo	14^{h} 46^{m} 11.3^{s}	−00° 13′ 23″	13.1
5765		Seyfert galaxy	Virgo	14^{h} 50^{m} 50.4^{s}	+05° 06′ 57″	14.6
5772		Spiral galaxy	Boötes	14^{h} 51^{m} 38.8908^{s}	+40° 35′ 57.126″	13.3g
5774		Intermediate spiral galaxy	Virgo	14^{h} 53^{m} 42.4^{s}	+03° 34′ 57.0″	12.3
5775		Spiral galaxy	Virgo	14^{h} 53^{m} 57.65^{s}	+03° 32′ 40.10″	11.34
5777		Spiral galaxy	Draco	14^{h} 51^{m} 18^{s}	+58° 58′ 39″	13.1
5778		Elliptical galaxy	Boötes	14^{h} 54^{m} 31.48^{s}	+18° 38′ 32.50″	
5784		Lenticular galaxy	Boötes	14^{h} 54^{m} 16.4505^{s}	+42° 3′ 28.466″	12.4
5790		Lenticular galaxy	Boötes	14^{h} 57^{m} 35.81^{s}	+08° 17′ 07.0″	15.1
5792		Barred spiral galaxy	Libra	14^{h} 58^{m} 22.7^{s}	−1° 07′ 28″	12.1
5793		Seyfert galaxy	Libra	14^{h} 59^{m} 24^{s}	−16° 41′ 36″	13.32

== 5801–5900 ==
NGC number	Other names	Object type	Constellation	Right ascension (J2000)	Declination (J2000)	Apparent magnitude
5806		Intermediate spiral galaxy	Virgo	15^{h} 00^{m} 00.4123^{s}	+01° 53′ 28.756″	11.70
5820		Lenticular galaxy	Boötes	14^{h} 58^{m} 39.822^{s}	+53° 53′ 10.02″	11.98
5821		Spiral galaxy	Boötes	14^{h} 58^{m} 59.722^{s}	+53° 55′ 23.41″	14.6
5822		Open cluster	Lupus	15^{h} 04^{m}	−54° 24′	6.5
5823		Open cluster	Circinus	15^{h} 05^{m} 44.8^{s}	−55° 37′ 30″	8.6
5824		Globular cluster	Lupus	15^{h} 03^{m} 58.5^{s}	−33° 04′ 04″	10.3
5825		Elliptical galaxy	Boötes	14^{h} 54^{m} 31.5^{s}	+18° 38′ 31″	15.6
5829		Spiral galaxy	Boötes	15^{h} 02^{m} 42.0^{s}	+23° 20′ 00.0″	14.1
5837		Barred spiral galaxy	Boötes	15^{h} 04^{m} 40.6^{s}	+12° 38′ 00″	14.5
5838		Lenticular galaxy	Virgo	15^{h} 05^{m} 26.3^{s}	+02° 05′ 57″	12.1
5844		Planetary nebula	Triangulum Australe	15^{h} 12^{m} 52^{s}	−64° 46′ 07″	13.2
5846		Elliptical galaxy	Virgo	15^{h} 06^{m} 29.4^{s}	+01° 36′ 19″	11.9
5850		Spiral galaxy	Virgo	15^{h} 07^{m} 07.8^{s}	+01° 32′ 39″	13.6
5854		Lenticular galaxy	Virgo	15^{h} 07^{m} 47.7018^{s}	+02° 34′ 07.064″	12.7g
5856	HD 134064	Triple star	Boötes	15^{h} 07^{m} 20.369^{s}	+18° 26′ 30.57″	6.03
5857		Barred spiral galaxy	Boötes	15^{h} 07^{m} 27.2818^{s}	+19° 35′ 51.942″	13.1
5861		Intermediate spiral galaxy	Libra	15^{h} 09^{m} 16.0974^{s}	−11° 19′ 18.089″	11.6
5866	Spindle Galaxy (Messier 102)	Lenticular galaxy	Draco	15^{h} 06^{m} 29.5^{s}	+55° 45′ 47″	11.1
5875		Spiral galaxy	Boötes	15^{h} 09^{m} 13.16^{s}	+52° 31′ 42.4″	12.4
5876	IC 1111	Barred spiral galaxy	Boötes	15^{h} 09^{m} 31.5629^{s}	+54° 30′ 23.384″	12.7
5877		Triple star	Lupus	15^{h} 12^{m} 53.1^{s}	−04° 55′ 38″	
5879		Spiral galaxy	Draco	15^{h} 09^{m} 46.8^{s}	+57° 00′ 01″	12.4
5882		Planetary nebula	Libra	15^{h} 16^{m} 49.9^{s}	−45° 38′ 58″	11.9
5885		Barred spiral galaxy	Libra	15^{h} 15^{m} 04.1^{s}	−10° 05′ 10.0″	11.7
5886		Elliptical galaxy	Boötes	15^{h} 12^{m} 45.4^{s}	41° 12′ 02″	14.0
5888		Barred spiral galaxy	Boötes	15^{h} 13^{m} 07.4^{s}	41° 15′ 52″	13.4
5890		Lenticular galaxy	Libra	15^{h} 17^{m} 51.1^{s}	17° 35′ 19″	12.7
5896		Spiral galaxy	Boötes	15^{h} 13^{m} 50.672^{s}	+42° 01′ 27.25″	
5897		Globular cluster	Libra	15^{h} 17^{m} 24.40^{s}	−21° 00′ 36.4″	8.52
5898		Elliptical galaxy	Libra	15^{h} 18^{m} 13.56^{s}	−24° 05′ 52.6″	11.4

== 5901–6000 ==
NGC number	Other names	Object type	Constellation	Right ascension (J2000)	Declination (J2000)	Apparent magnitude
5904	Messier 5	Globular cluster	Serpens	15^{h} 18^{m} 33.8^{s}	+02° 04′ 58″	7.3
5905		Barred spiral galaxy	Draco	15^{h} 15^{m} 23.3243^{s}	+55° 31′ 01.995″	12.49
5907	NGC 5906; Knife Edge Galaxy; Splinter Galaxy	Spiral galaxy	Draco	15^{h} 15^{m} 53^{s}	+56° 19′ 40″	11.1
5915		Barred spiral galaxy	Libra	15^{h} 21^{m} 33.08^{s}	−13° 05′ 30.3″	12.3
5917		Spiral galaxy	Libra	15^{h} 21^{m} 32.56^{s}	−07° 22′ 37.65″	13.7
5921		Barred spiral galaxy	Serpens	15^{h} 21^{m} 56.5^{s}	+05° 04′ 14″	11.5
5925		Open cluster	Norma	15^{h} 27^{m} 26.6^{s}	−54° 32′ 04″	8.4
5927		Globular cluster	Lupus	15^{h} 28^{m} 00.69^{s}	−50° 40′ 22.9″	8.86
5929		Seyfert galaxy	Boötes	15^{h} 26^{m} 07.987^{s}	+41° 40′ 33.92″	14.0
5930		Starburst galaxy	Boötes	15^{h} 26^{m} 07.987^{s}	+41° 40′ 33.92″	12.2
5936		Barred spiral galaxy	Serpens	15^{h} 30^{m} 00.8343^{s}	+12° 59′ 21.57″	12.5
5939		Spiral galaxy	Ursa Minor	15^{h} 24^{m} 46.03^{s}	+68° 43′ 50.3″	13.1
5949		Dwarf galaxy	Draco	15^{h} 28^{m} 0.67^{s}	+64° 45′ 47.35″	12.7
5962		Spiral galaxy	Serpens	15^{h} 36^{m} 31.8^{s}	+16° 36′ 28″	12.2
5964		Spiral galaxy	Serpens	15^{h} 37^{m} 36.4^{s}	+05° 58′ 25″	14.2
5965		Spiral galaxy	Draco	15^{h} 34^{m} 02.5^{s}	+56° 41′ 08″	11.9
5967		Barred spiral galaxy	Apus	15^{h} 48^{m} 15.9241^{s}	−75° 40′ 22.219″	12.6b
5979		Planetary nebula	Triangulum Australe	15^{h} 47^{m} 41^{s}	−61° 13′ 05″	12.1
5980		Spiral galaxy	Serpens	15^{h} 41^{m} 30.4158^{s}	+15° 47′ 15.738″	12.3B
5986		Globular cluster	Lupus	15^{h} 46^{m} 03.4^{s}	−37° 47′ 10″	9.1
5988		Spiral galaxy	Serpens	15^{h} 44^{m} 33.8594^{s}	+10° 17′ 35.331″	13.8
6000	PGC 56145	Barred spiral galaxy	Scorpius	15^{h} 49^{m} 49.5^{s}	−29° 23′ 13″	11.27 +/- 0.09

== See also ==
- Lists of astronomical objects
