= NGC 5890 =

Galaxy in the constellation Libra

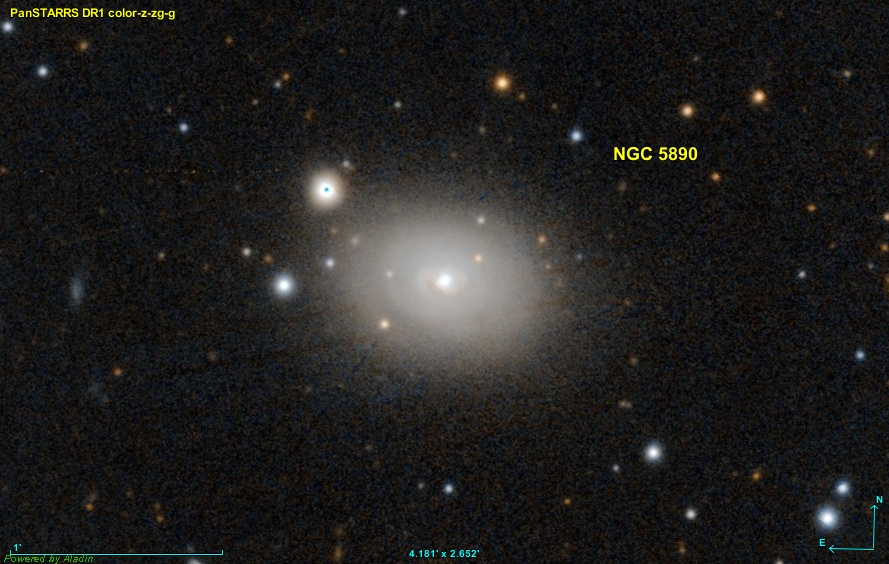
- NGC 6890

Observation data (J2000 epoch)
- Right ascension: 15^{h} 17^{m} 51.174^{s}
- Declination: 17° 35′ 21.47″
- Redshift: 0.006831
- Heliocentric radial velocity: 2041 km/s

Characteristics
- Type: SA0

Other designations
- PGC 54602, IRAS 15150-1724, MCG -3-39-4

NGC 5890 is an unbarred lenticular galaxy in the constellation Libra. It was discovered in April 1785 by Ormond Stone.

== See also ==
- Unbarred lenticular galaxy
- List of NGC objects (5001–6000)
- Libra (constellation)
