= NGC 5716 =

Galaxy in the constellation Libra

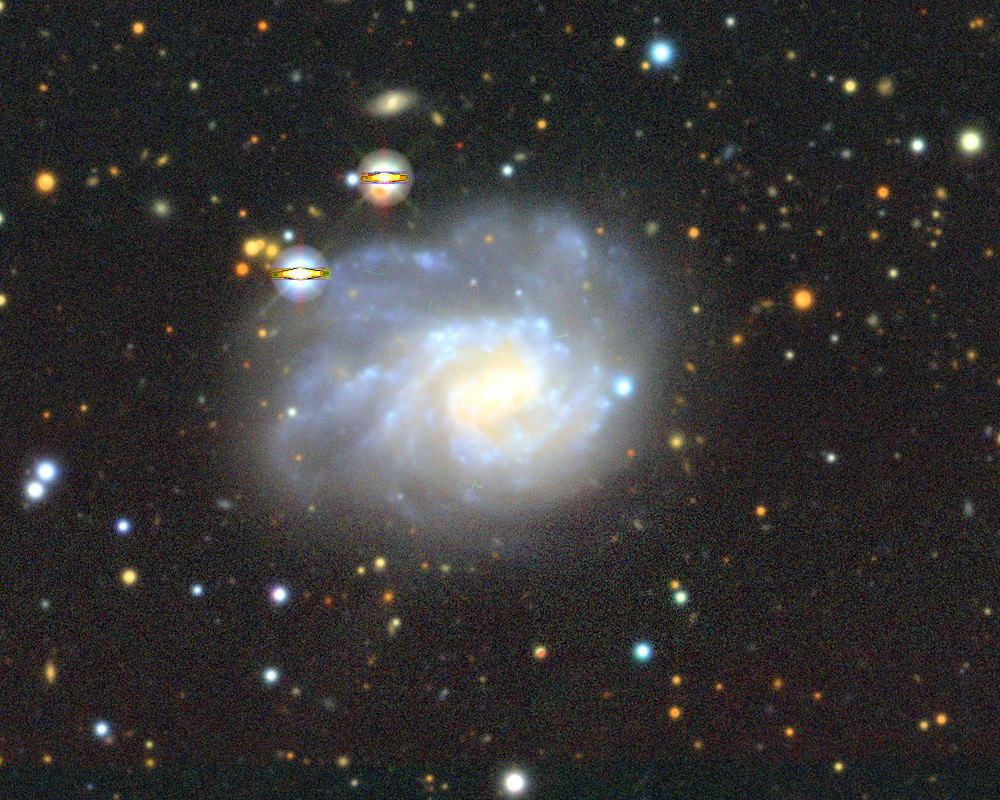
- NGC 5716 imaged by Legacy Surveys

Observation data (J2000 epoch)
- Constellation: Libra
- Right ascension: 14^{h} 41^{m} 05.5473^{s}
- Declination: −17° 28′ 37.177″
- Redshift: 0.013860±0.0000100
- Heliocentric radial velocity: 4,155±3 km/s
- Distance: 129.70 ± 1.43 Mly (39.767 ± 0.437 Mpc)
- Apparent magnitude (V): 13.25

Characteristics
- Type: SB(rs)c
- Size: ~75,300 ly (23.08 kpc) (estimated)
- Apparent size (V): 1.8′ × 1.3′

Other designations
- IRAS 14383-1715, 2MASX J14410551-1728369, MCG -03-37-004, PGC 52458

NGC 5716 is a barred spiral galaxy in the constellation of Libra. Its velocity with respect to the cosmic microwave background is 4,384±16 km/s, which corresponds to a Hubble distance of 210.9 ± 14.8 Mly (64.66 ± 4.53 Mpc). However, three non-redshift measurements give a much closer mean distance of 129.70 ± 1.43 Mly (39.767 ± 0.437 Mpc). It was discovered by German-British astronomer William Herschel on 7 May 1787.

NGC 5716 has a possible active galactic nucleus, i.e. it has a compact region at the center of a galaxy that emits a significant amount of energy across the electromagnetic spectrum, with characteristics indicating that this luminosity is not produced by the stars.

== Supernova ==
One supernova has been observed in NGC 5716:

- SN 2024adxu (Type II, mag. 15.8337) was discovered by the Automatic Learning for the Rapid Classification of Events (ALeRCE) on 12 December 2024.

== See also ==
- List of NGC objects (5001–6000)
