= NGC 5626 =

Galaxy in the constellation Hydra

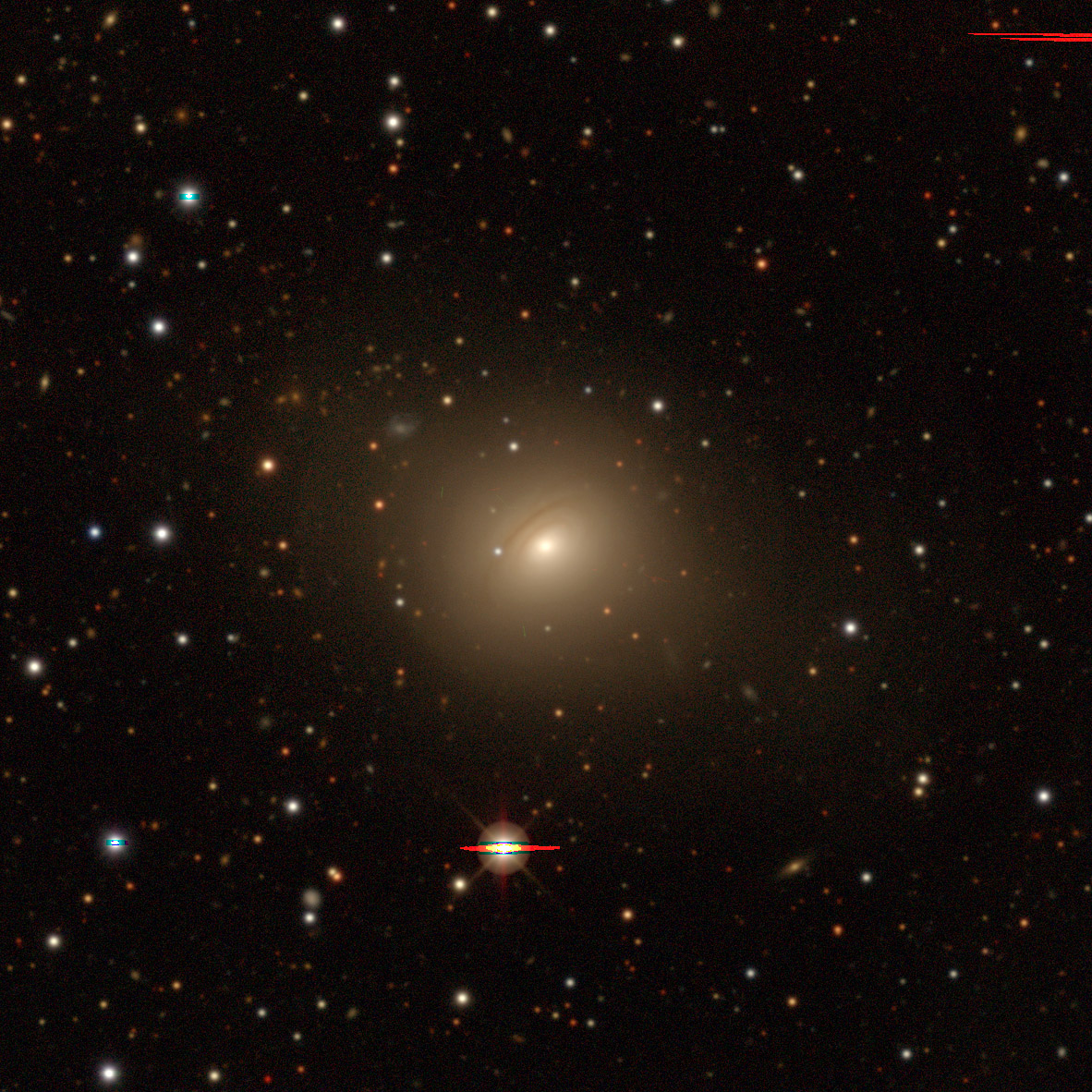
- NGC 5626 imaged by Legacy Surveys

Observation data (J2000 epoch)
- Constellation: Hydra
- Right ascension: 14^{h} 29^{m} 49.1156^{s}
- Declination: −29° 44′ 54.545″
- Redshift: 0.022983
- Heliocentric radial velocity: 6890 ± 12 km/s
- Distance: 342.5 ± 24.0 Mly (105.02 ± 7.36 Mpc)
- Apparent magnitude (V): 12.9

Characteristics
- Type: SA(s)0+
- Size: ~205,300 ly (62.94 kpc) (estimated)
- Apparent size (V): 1.2′ × 1.0′

Other designations
- ESO 447- G 008, 2MASX J14294908-2944544, MCG -05-34-015, PGC 51794

NGC 5626 is a lenticular galaxy in the constellation of Hydra. Its velocity with respect to the cosmic microwave background is 7,120 ± 20 km/s, which corresponds to a Hubble distance of 105.0 ± 7.4 Mpc (~342 million light-years). It was discovered by British astronomer John Herschel on 30 March 1835.

One supernova has been observed in NGC 5626: SN 2023kyb (Type Ia, mag. 17.679) was discovered by ATLAS on 17 June 2023.

== See also ==
- List of NGC objects (5001–6000)
