= NGC 5612 =

Galaxy in the constellation Apus

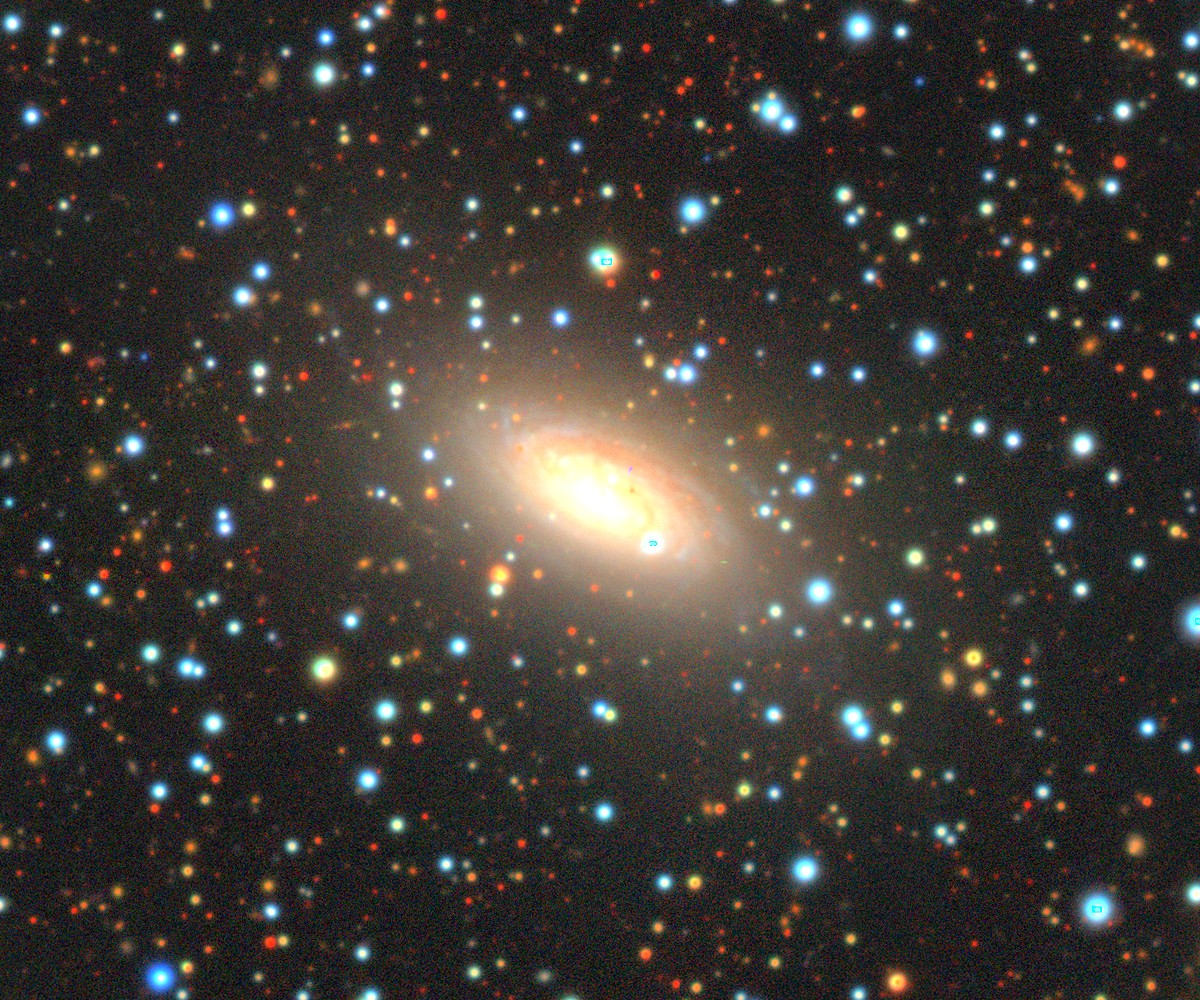
- NGC 5612 imaged by Legacy Surveys

Observation data (J2000 epoch)
- Constellation: Apus
- Right ascension: 14^{h} 34^{m} 01.1403^{s}
- Declination: −78° 23′ 15.202″
- Redshift: 0.009003±0.000137
- Heliocentric radial velocity: 2,699±41 km/s
- Distance: 127.36 ± 14.51 Mly (39.050 ± 4.450 Mpc)
- Group or cluster: LDC 1118
- Apparent magnitude (V): 13.04

Characteristics
- Type: SAab
- Size: ~120,400 ly (36.91 kpc) (estimated)
- Apparent size (V): 1.9′ × 1.0′

Other designations
- ESO 022- G 001, IRAS 14281-7809, 2MASX J14340127-7823148, PGC 52057

NGC 5612 is a spiral galaxy in the constellation of Apus. Its velocity with respect to the cosmic microwave background is 2,790±42 km/s, which corresponds to a Hubble distance of 134.2 ± 9.8 Mly (41.16 ± 3.01 Mpc). Additionally, two non-redshift measurements give a closer mean distance of 127.36 ± 14.51 Mly (39.050 ± 4.450 Mpc). It was discovered by British astronomer John Herschel on 23 May 1835.

NGC 5612 has a possible active galactic nucleus, i.e. it has a compact region at the center of a galaxy that emits a significant amount of energy across the electromagnetic spectrum, with characteristics indicating that this luminosity is not produced by the stars.

== LDC 1118 group ==
NGC 5612 belongs to the 6 member galaxy group known as LDC 1118. The other galaxies in the group include IC 4522, IC 4555, ESO 22-10, LEDA 235897, and LEDA 5061296.

== Supernova ==
One supernova has been observed in NGC 5612:

- SN 2004ch (Type II, mag. 16) was discovered by the Perth Automated Supernova Search on 28 May 2004.

== See also ==
- List of NGC objects (5001–6000)
