= NGC 5056 =

Galaxy in the constellation Coma Berenices

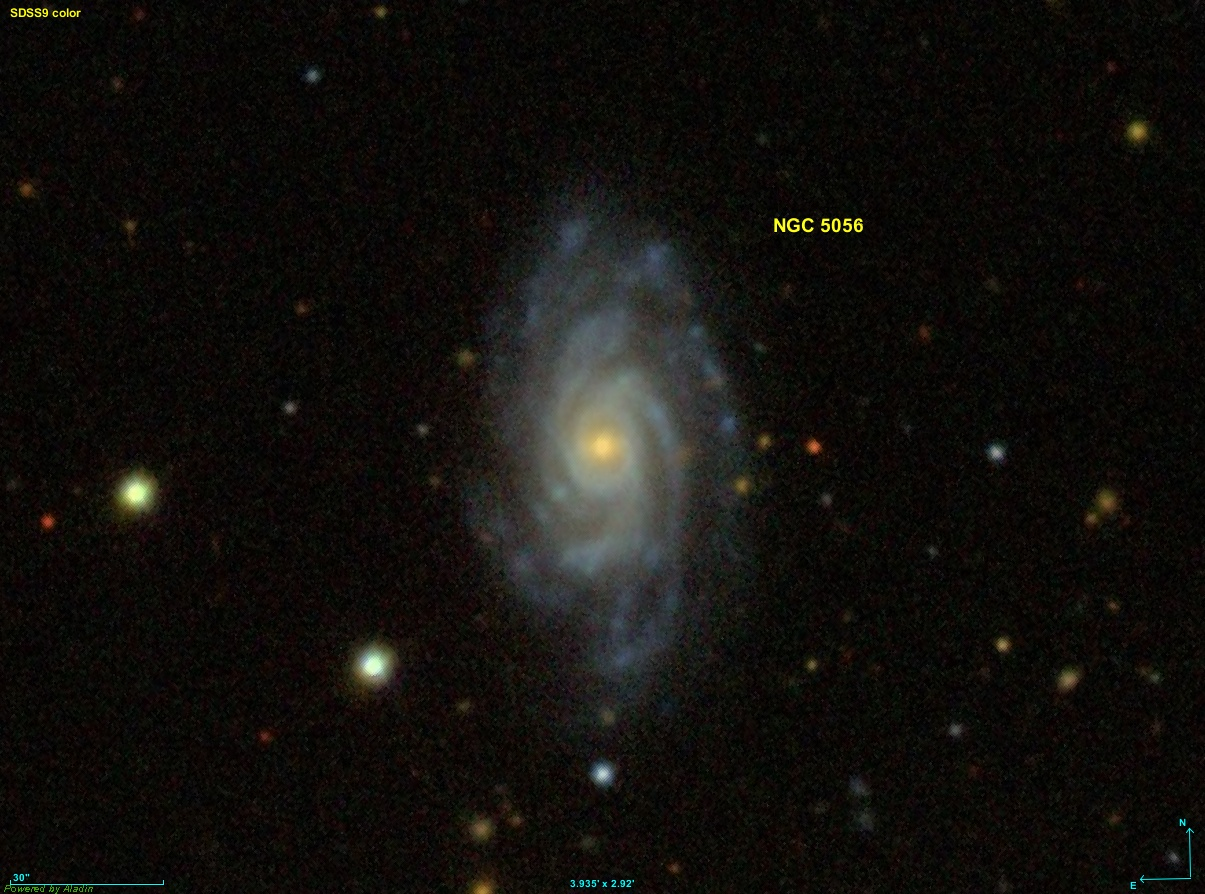
- NGC 5056 imaged by SDSS

Observation data (J2000 epoch)
- Constellation: Coma Berenices
- Right ascension: 13^{h} 16^{m} 12.3527^{s}
- Declination: +30° 57′ 01.239″
- Redshift: 0.018653±0.000005
- Heliocentric radial velocity: 5,592±1 km/s
- Distance: 208.31 ± 10.46 Mly (63.867 ± 3.207 Mpc)
- Group or cluster: [M98j] 192
- Apparent magnitude (V): 13.7

Characteristics
- Type: Scd
- Size: ~135,800 ly (41.65 kpc) (estimated)
- Apparent size (V): 1.7′ × 1.0′

Other designations
- IRAS 13138+3112, UGC 8337, MCG +05-31-166, PGC 46180, CGCG 160-173

NGC 5056 is a spiral galaxy in the constellation of Coma Berenices. Its velocity with respect to the cosmic microwave background is 5,839±17 km/s, which corresponds to a Hubble distance of 280.9 ± 19.7 Mly (86.13 ± 6.03 Mpc). However, 39 non-redshift measurements give a closer mean distance of 208.31 ± 10.46 Mly (63.867 ± 3.207 Mpc). It was discovered by German-British astronomer William Herschel on 13 March 1785.

NGC 5056 is listed as having an active galactic nucleus.

According to Abraham Mahtessian, NGC 5056 and NGC 5065 form a pair of galaxies, known as [M98j] 192.

== Supernova ==
One supernova has been observed in NGC 5056:

- SN 2005au (Type II, mag. 15.8) was discovered by British amateur astronomer Ron Arbour on 19 March 2005.

== See also ==
- List of NGC objects (5001–6000)
