= NGC 5967 =

Galaxy in the constellation Apus

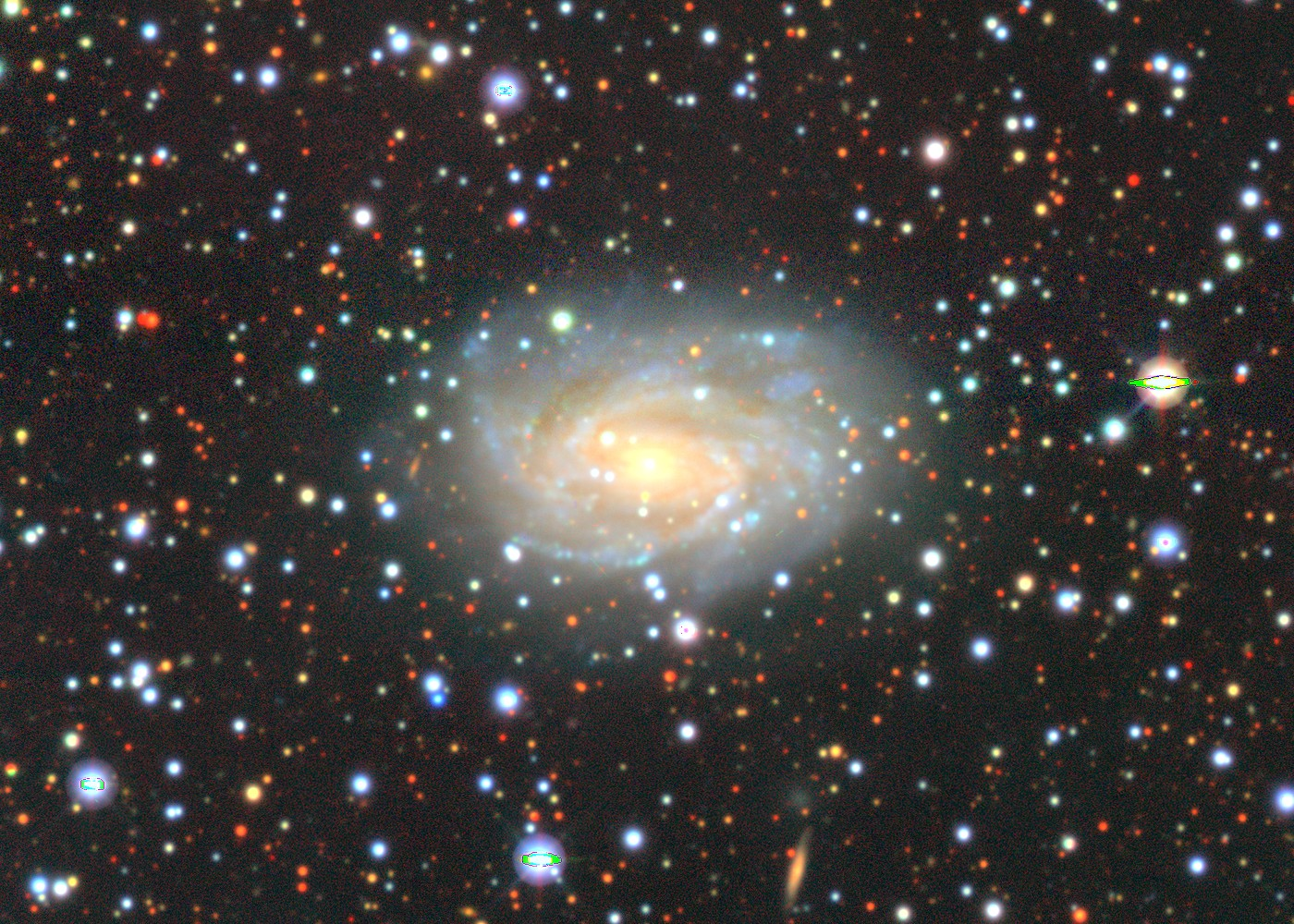
- NGC 5967 imaged by Legacy Surveys

Observation data (J2000 epoch)
- Constellation: Apus
- Right ascension: 15^{h} 48^{m} 15.9241^{s}
- Declination: −75° 40′ 22.219″
- Redshift: 0.009623±0.0000190
- Heliocentric radial velocity: 2,885±6 km/s
- Distance: 116.04 ± 2.62 Mly (35.578 ± 0.802 Mpc)
- Apparent magnitude (V): 12.6b

Characteristics
- Type: SAB(rs)c
- Size: ~115,800 ly (35.50 kpc) (estimated)
- Apparent size (V): 2.9′ × 1.7′

Other designations
- ESO 042- G 010, IRAS 15421-7531, 2MASX J15481597-7540226, PGC 56078

NGC 5967 is a barred spiral galaxy in the constellation of Apus. Its velocity with respect to the cosmic microwave background is 2,961±8 km/s, which corresponds to a Hubble distance of 142.5 ± 10.0 Mly (43.68 ± 3.06 Mpc). However, 18 non-redshift measurements give a much closer mean distance of 116.04 ± 2.62 Mly (35.578 ± 0.802 Mpc). It was discovered by British astronomer John Herschel on 7 June 1836.

NGC 5967 has a possible active galactic nucleus, i.e. it has a compact region at the center of a galaxy that emits a significant amount of energy across the electromagnetic spectrum, with characteristics indicating that this luminosity is not produced by the stars.

== Supernova ==
One supernova has been observed in NGC 5967:

- SN 2009gd (Type Ic, mag. 16.4) was discovered by Peter Marples, C. Drescher, G. Bock, M. Brown and J. Moser on 9 June 2009.

== See also ==
- List of NGC objects (5001–6000)
