= NGC 5722 =

Galaxy in the constellation Boötes

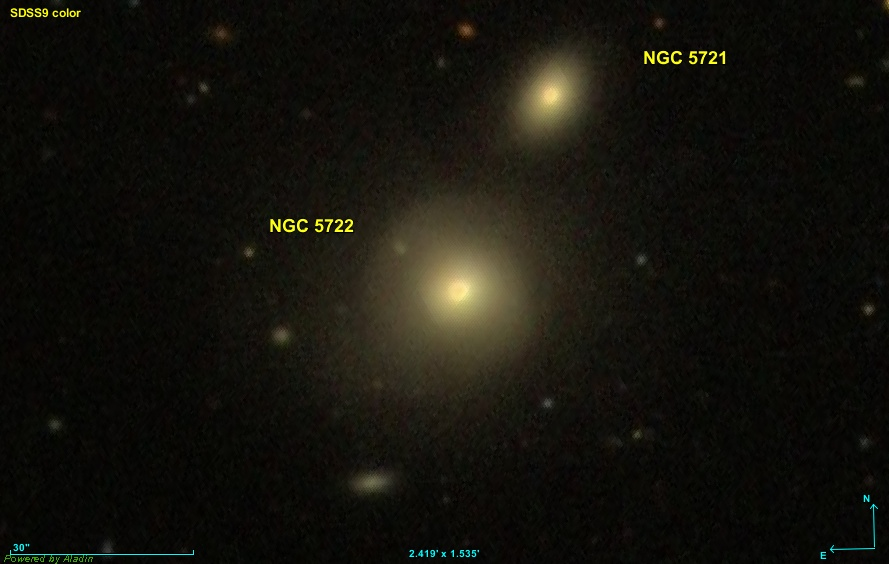
- NGC 5722 imaged by SDSS

Observation data (J2000 epoch)
- Constellation: Boötes
- Right ascension: 14^{h} 38^{m} 54.4118^{s}
- Declination: +46° 39′ 56.299″
- Redshift: 0.035862±0.00000884
- Heliocentric radial velocity: 10,751±3 km/s
- Distance: 523.2 ± 36.6 Mly (160.40 ± 11.23 Mpc)
- Apparent magnitude (V): 15.0g

Characteristics
- Size: ~191,700 ly (58.79 kpc) (estimated)
- Apparent size (V): 0.76′ × 0.64′

Other designations
- 2MASX J14385438+4639562, MCG +08-27-014, PGC 52355, CGCG 248-016 NED01

NGC 5722 is a large lenticular galaxy in the constellation of Boötes. Its velocity with respect to the cosmic microwave background is 10,875±9 km/s, which corresponds to a Hubble distance of 523.2 ± 36.6 Mly (160.40 ± 11.23 Mpc). Additionally, one non-redshift measurement gives a slightly farther distance of 531.63 Mly (163.000 Mpc). It was discovered by British astronomer John Herschel on 26 April 1830.

NGC 5722 is a Seyfert II galaxy, i.e. it has a quasar-like nucleus with very high surface brightnesses whose spectra reveal strong, high-ionisation emission lines, but unlike quasars, the host galaxy is clearly detectable.

== Compact galaxy group ==
NGC 5722 is a member of a compact galaxy group catalogued as MLCG 1495. The other galaxies in the group are NGC 5721, NGC 5723, and SDSS J143853.22+464152.1.

== See also ==
- List of NGC objects (5001–6000)
