= NGC 5004 =

Galaxy in constellation Coma Berenices

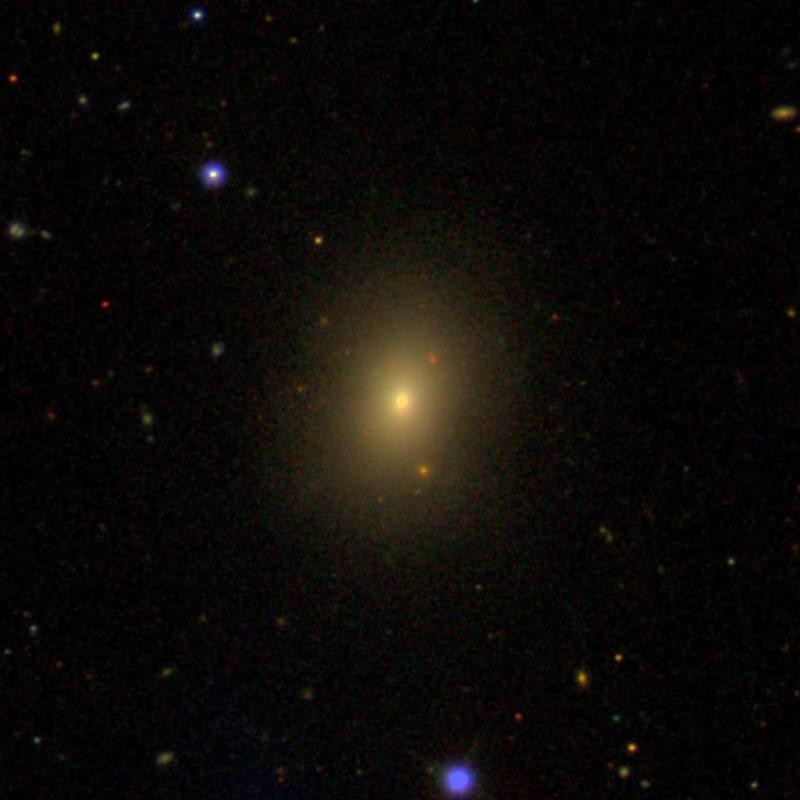
- NGC 5004 by the Sloan Digital Sky Survey

Observation data (J2000 epoch)
- Constellation: Coma Berenices
- Right ascension: 13^{h} 11^{m} 01.55^{s}
- Declination: +29° 38′ 12.13″
- Redshift: 0.0235
- Distance: 324 Mly

Characteristics
- Type: S0
- Apparent size (V): 1.4' x 1.1'

Other designations
- IRAS 13086+2950, LEDA 45756, MCG 05-31-149, UGC 8260

NGC 5004 is a lenticular galaxy in the constellation Coma Berenices. The object was discovered by astronomer William Herschel on 13 March 1785, using an 18.7-inch aperture reflector telescope. Due to its moderate apparent magnitude (+13), it is visible only with amateur telescopes or with superior equipment.

== See also ==
- List of NGC objects (5001–6000)
