= NGC 6000 =

Galaxy in the constellation Scorpius

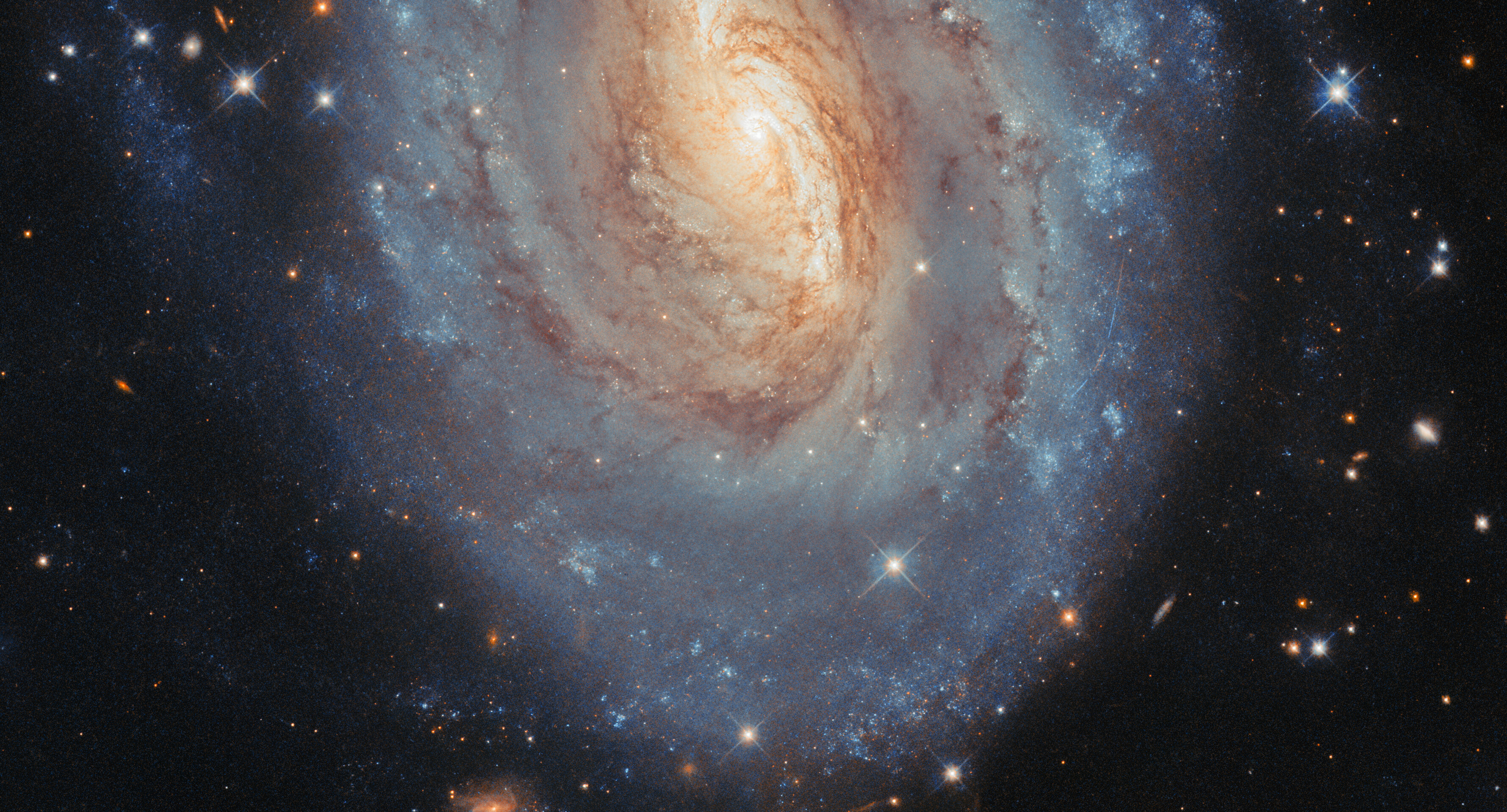
- The southern half of NGC 6000 imaged by the Hubble Space Telescope

Observation data (J2000 epoch)
- Constellation: Scorpius
- Right ascension: 15^{h} 49^{m} 49.5423^{s}
- Declination: −29° 23′ 12.797″
- Redshift: 0.007315±0.000003
- Heliocentric radial velocity: 2193±1 km/s
- Galactocentric velocity: 2140±2 km/s
- Distance: 88.84 ± 7.70 Mly (27.240 ± 2.362 Mpc)
- Apparent magnitude (V): 13.01
- Absolute magnitude (V): -20.89 +/- 0.36

Characteristics
- Type: SB(s)bc
- Size: ~66,600 ly (20.43 kpc) (estimated)
- Apparent size (V): 1.9′ × 1.6′

Other designations
- ESO 450- G 020, IRAS 15467-2914, MCG -05-37-003, PGC 56145
- References: NASA/IPAC extragalactic database, http://spider.seds.org/, http://cseligman.com

NGC 6000 is a barred spiral galaxy located in the constellation Scorpius. Its velocity with respect to the cosmic microwave background is 2,328±9 km/s, which corresponds to a Hubble distance of 112.0 ± 7.9 Mly (34.33 ± 2.41 Mpc). However, 5 non-redshift measurements give a closer mean distance of 88.84 ± 7.70 Mly (27.240 ± 2.362 Mpc). It was discovered by British astronomer John Herschel on 8 May 1834. It is designated as SB(s)bc in the galaxy morphological classification scheme, and is the brightest of all the galaxies in the constellation Scorpius.

NGC 6000 is a Seyfert II galaxy, i.e. it has a quasar-like nucleus with very high surface brightnesses whose spectra reveal strong, high-ionisation emission lines, but unlike quasars, the host galaxy is clearly detectable.

NGC 6000 has a glowing yellow centre with glittering blue outskirts.

== Supernovae ==
Two supernovae have been observed in NGC 6000:

- SN 2007ch (Type II, mag. 17.2) was discovered by Berto Monard on 11 May 2007.
- SN 2010as (Type Ib/Ic, mag. 15.5) was discovered by The CHilean Automatic Supernova sEarch (CHASE) on 19 March 2010.

== See also ==
- List of NGC objects (5001–6000)
