= NGC 5161 =

Galaxy in the constellation Centaurus

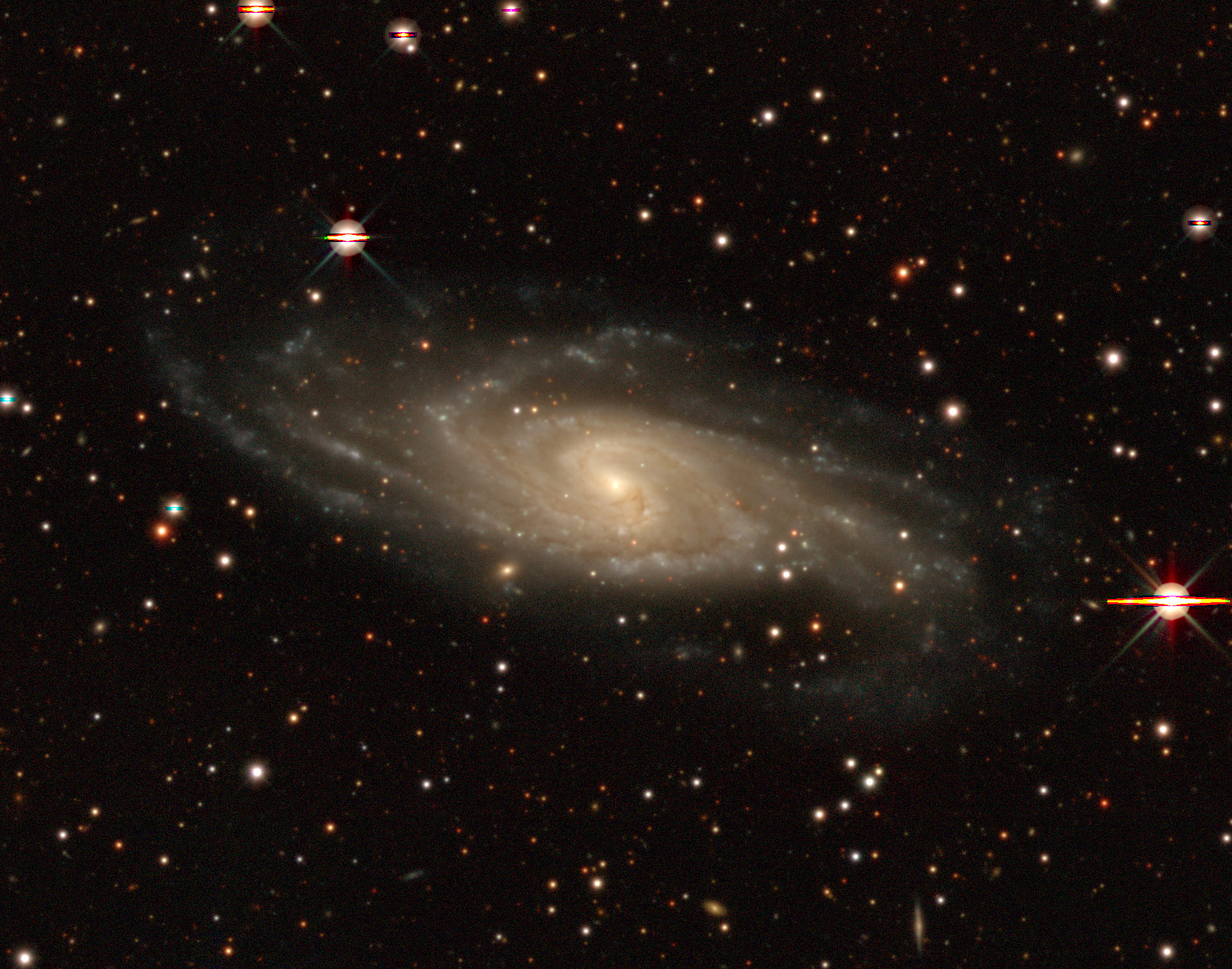
- NGC 5161 imaged by legacy surveys

Observation data (J2000 epoch)
- Constellation: Centaurus
- Right ascension: 13^{h} 29^{m} 13.9170^{s}
- Declination: −33° 10′ 26.056″
- Redshift: 0.007969±0.000002
- Heliocentric radial velocity: 2,389±1 km/s
- Distance: 74.15 ± 2.53 Mly (22.736 ± 0.777 Mpc)
- Apparent magnitude (V): 12.0

Characteristics
- Type: SA(s)c
- Apparent size (V): 5.6′ × 2.2′

Other designations
- ESO 383- G 004, IRAS 13264-3255, UGCA 359, MCG -05-32-031, PGC 47321

NGC 5161 is a spiral galaxy in the constellation Centaurus. Its velocity with respect to the cosmic microwave background is 2,668±20 km/s, which corresponds to a Hubble distance of 128.4 ± 9.0 Mly (39.36 ± 2.77 Mpc). However, 28 non-redshift measurements give a much closer mean distance of 74.15 ± 2.53 Mly (22.736 ± 0.777 Mpc). It was discovered by British astronomer John Herschel on 3 June 1836.

== Characteristics ==
The plane of the galactic disk is inclined at an angle of 68° to the line of sight from the Earth. The galaxy has a faint bar which near its ends, were the spiral arms begin, has ansae. The galaxy has two spiral arms which can be followed for more than 180 degrees. The arms are patchy and fragmented and feature small star forming areas visible in H alpha. There is also H alpha emission from the nucleus. In near infrared the bulge appears more pronounced and the outer arms have low surface brightness.

The stellar mass of the galaxy is estimated to be 10^{10.5} M_{☉}. In the centre of the galaxy is predicted to lie a supermassive black hole whose mass is estimated to be between 1.2 and 7.2 million solar masses, based on the spiral arm pitch angle.

== Supernovae ==
Two supernovae have been observed in NGC 5161:

- SN 1974B (type unknown, mag. 14.5) was discovered by Charles Kowal on 28 January 1974.
- SN 1998E (Type IIn, mag. 16.5) was discovered by the Perth Astronomical Research Group on 29 January 1998.

== Nearby galaxies ==
NGC 5161 belongs to the NGC 5188 group. Other members of the group include NGC 5188, ESO 382-066, and ESO 383-035.

== See also ==
- New General Catalogue
- List of NGC objects (5001–6000)
