= NGC 5790 =

Lenticular Galaxy in the Constellation Boötes

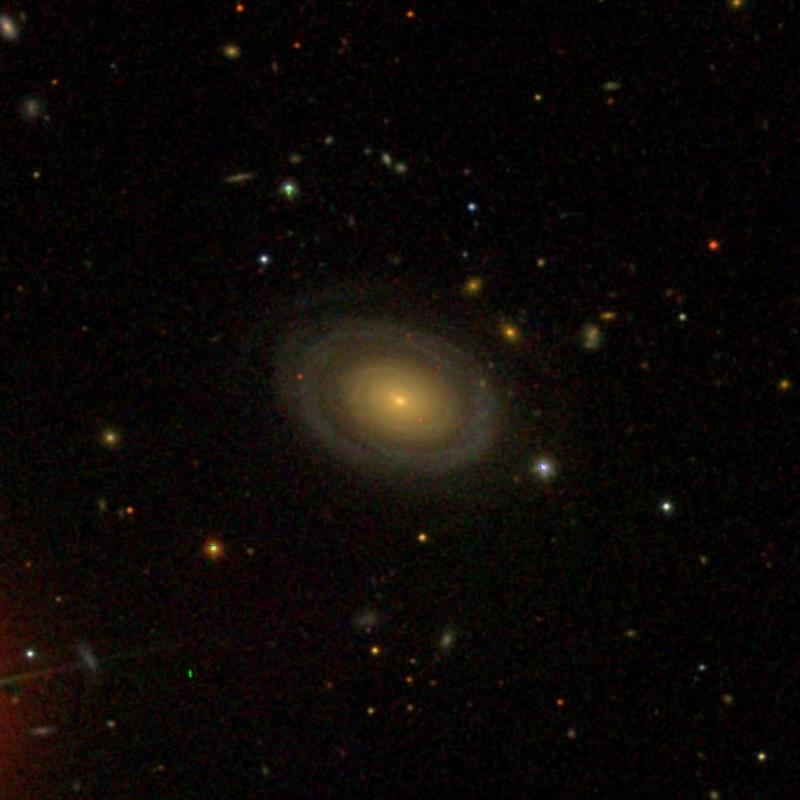
- NGC 5790 taken by SDSS

Observation data (J2000 epoch)
- Constellation: Boötes
- Right ascension: 14^{h} 57^{m} 35.8100^{s}
- Declination: +08^{h} 17^{m} 07.000^{s}
- Redshift: 0.036914
- Heliocentric radial velocity: 11,067 km/s
- Distance: 541 Mly (166 mpc)
- Apparent magnitude (V): 15.1

Characteristics
- Type: (R)SA0/a
- Size: 180,000 ly

Other designations
- Z 48-76, UGC 9624, LEDA 53459, MCG +01-38-22, PGC 53459

NGC 5790 is a lenticular galaxy located 541 million light-years away in the constellation Boötes. It was discovered on 16 May 1884 by French astronomer Édouard Stephan. The galaxy is approximately 180,000 light-years across. NGC 5790 is a type 2 Seyfert galaxy according to the SIMBAD database.

== See also ==
- List of NGC objects (5001–6000)
