= NGC 5114 =

Galaxy in the constellation Centaurus

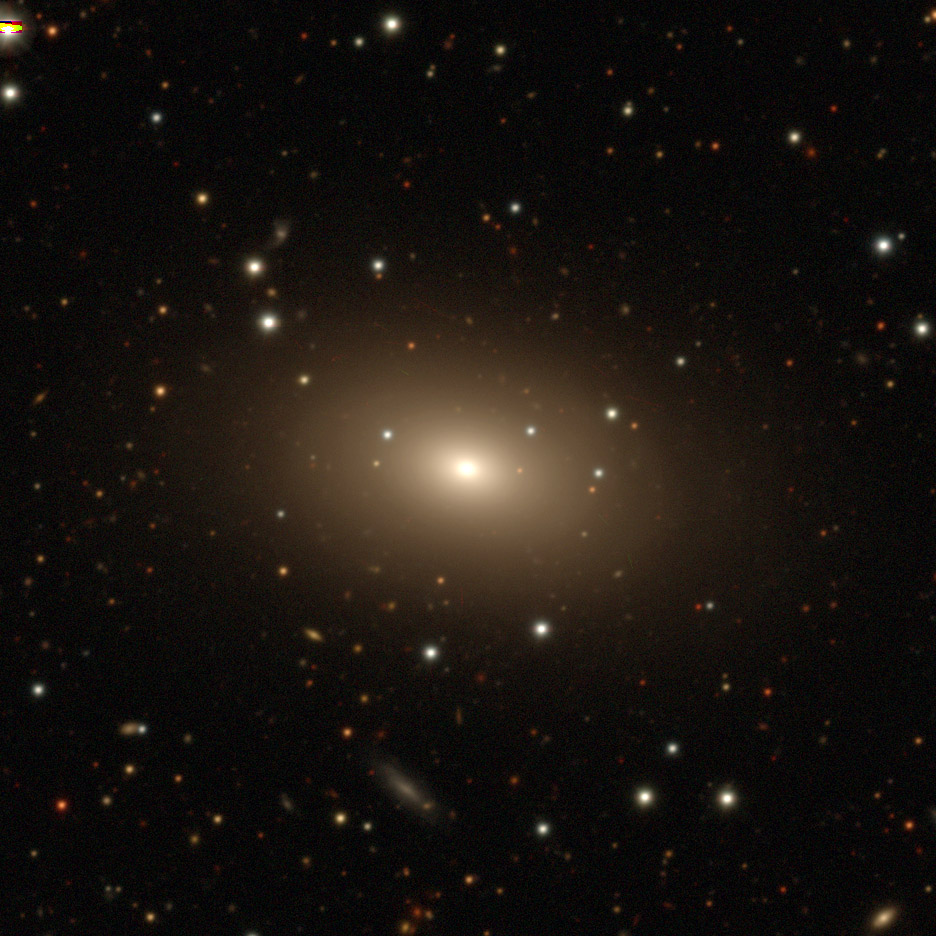
- legacy surveys image of NGC 5114.

Observation data (J2000 epoch)
- Constellation: Centaurus
- Right ascension: 13^{h} 24^{m} 01.7^{s}
- Declination: −32° 20′ 38″
- Redshift: 0.011945
- Heliocentric radial velocity: 3581 km/s
- Distance: 172 Mly
- Apparent magnitude (V): 13.45

Characteristics
- Type: SAB0-
- Size: ~130,400 ly (estimated)
- Apparent size (V): 1.7 x 1.0

Other designations
- ESO 444-24, MCG -5-32-6, PGC 46828

NGC 5114 is a lenticular galaxy located about 170 million light-years away in the constellation Centaurus. The galaxy was discovered by astronomer John Herschel on June 3, 1836.

== See also ==
- List of NGC objects (5001–6000)
