= NGC 5678 =

Galaxy in the constellation Draco

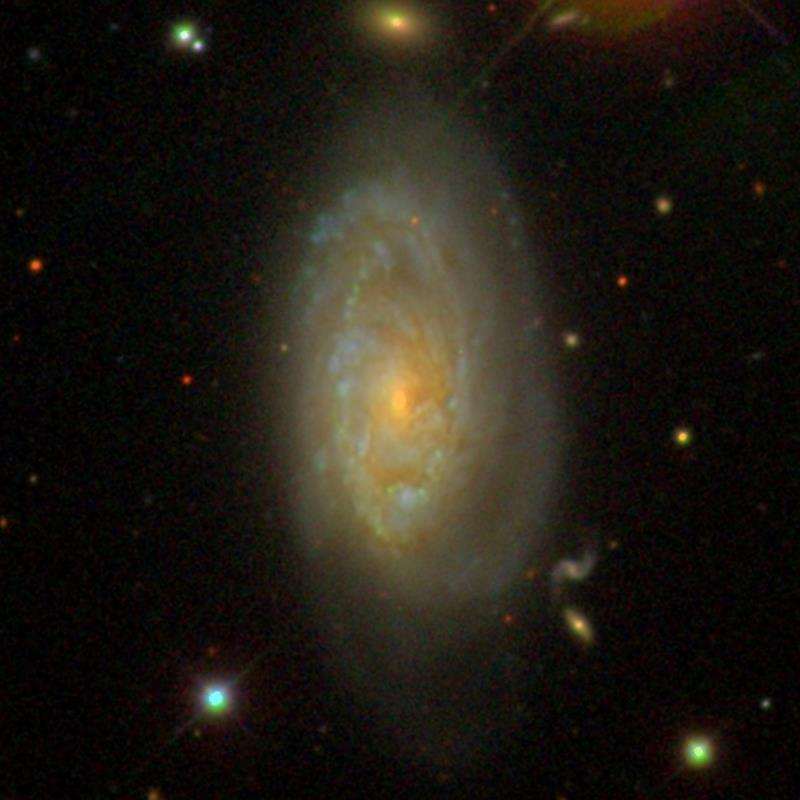
- Image of NGC 5678 from the Sloan Digital Sky Survey

Observation data (J2000 epoch)
- Constellation: Draco
- Right ascension: 14^{h} 32^{m} 05^{s}
- Declination: +57° 55′ 17″
- Redshift: 0.006378
- Heliocentric radial velocity: 1912 ± 3 km/s
- Apparent magnitude (B): 12.10

Characteristics
- Type: SAB(rs)b
- Apparent size (V): 1.34′ × 1.19′ (G band)

Other designations
- NGC 5678, MCG+10-21-005, LEDA 51932

NGC 5678 is a barred spiral galaxy in the constellation of Draco. It was discovered by William Herschel on April 17, 1789.

It is located north of the celestial equator making NGC 5678 more visible in the northern hemisphere.

== See also ==
- List of NGC objects (5001–6000)
