= NGC 5619 =

Spiral galaxy in the constellation Virgo

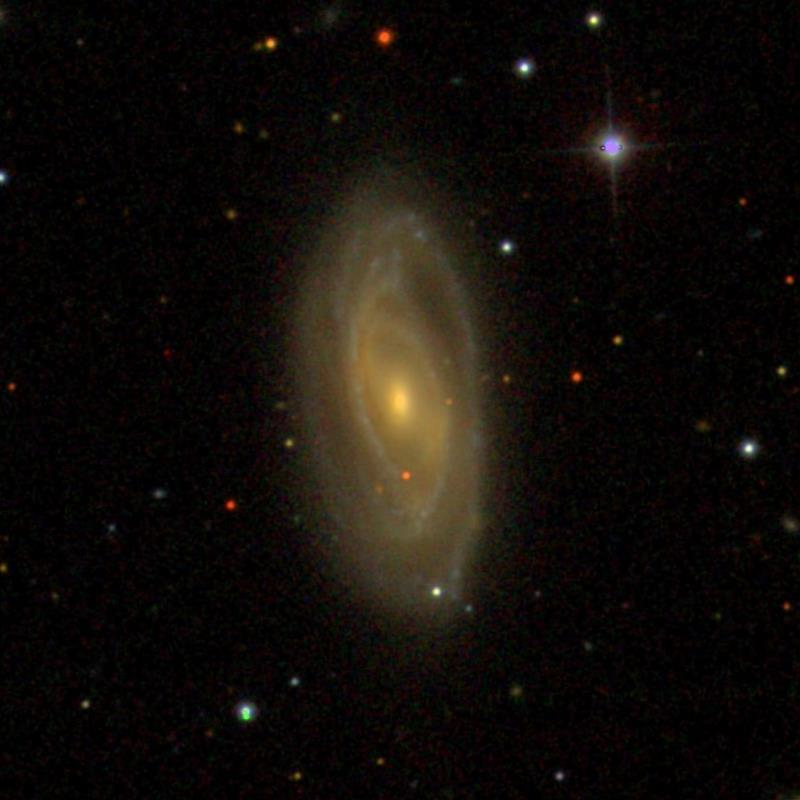
- SDSS image of NGC 5619

Observation data (J2000 epoch)
- Constellation: Virgo
- Right ascension: 14^{h} 27^{m} 18.229^{s}
- Declination: +04° 48′ 10.15″
- Redshift: 0.02788
- Heliocentric radial velocity: 8242 km/s
- Distance: 390 Mly (121 Mpc)
- Apparent magnitude (B): 13.40

Characteristics
- Type: SAB(rs)b

Other designations
- UGC 9255, MCG +01-37-012, PGC 51610

NGC 5619 (also known as NGC 5619A) is an intermediate spiral galaxy in the constellation Virgo. The galaxy was found on April 10, 1828, by the British astronomer John Herschel. It is located about 390 million light-years (120 Mpc) away from the Sun.

NGC 5619 is a radio galaxy.

== See also ==
- List of NGC objects
