= NGC 5582 =

Galaxy in the constellation Boötes

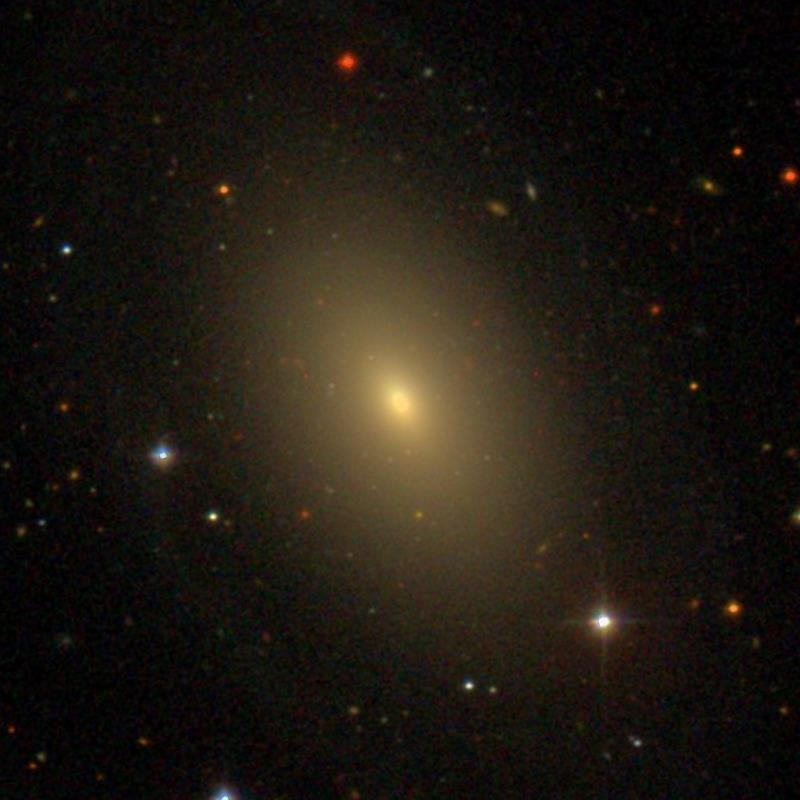
- SDSS image of NGC 5582

Observation data (J2000 epoch)
- Constellation: Boötes
- Right ascension: 14^{h} 20^{m} 43.12^{s}
- Declination: +39° 41′ 36.9″
- Redshift: 0.004810
- Heliocentric radial velocity: 1439 ± 9 km/s
- Distance: 91.49 ± 0.46 Mly (28.05 ± 0.14 Mpc)
- Apparent magnitude (V): 11.61
- Apparent magnitude (B): 13.0
- Absolute magnitude (V): −20.94

Characteristics
- Type: E3-4

Other designations
- UGC 9188, MCG +07-29-063, PGC 51251

NGC 5582 is an elliptical galaxy in the constellation Boötes. It was discovered by William Herschel on April 29, 1788.
