= NGC 5026 =

Galaxy in the constellation Centaurus

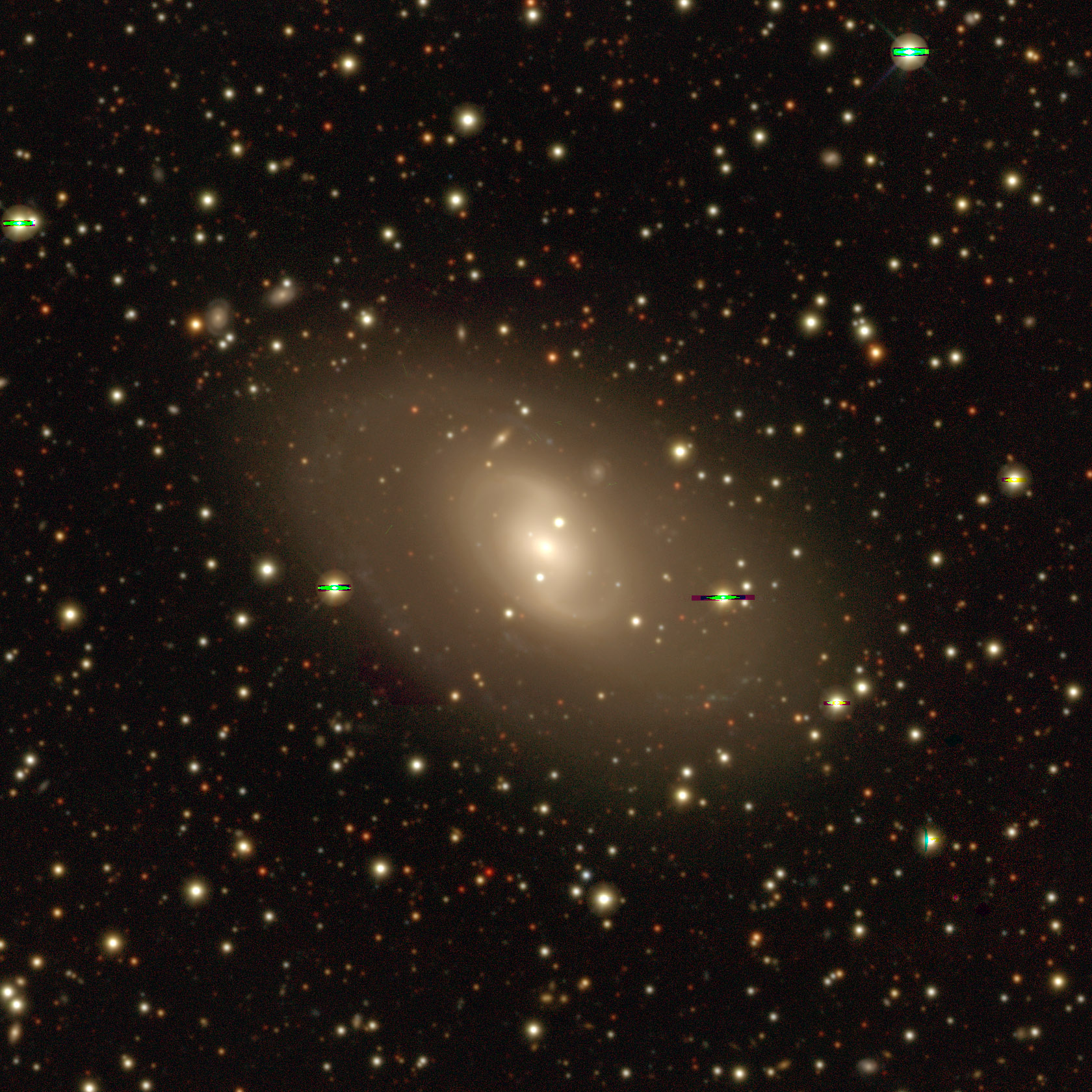
- legacy surveys image of NGC 5026

Observation data (J2000 epoch)
- Constellation: Centaurus
- Right ascension: 13^{h} 14^{m} 13.656^{s}
- Declination: −42° 57′ 40.45″
- Redshift: 0.011838
- Heliocentric radial velocity: 3549 km/s
- Distance: 130.6 Mly (40.03 Mpc)
- Apparent magnitude (V): 13.42
- Apparent magnitude (B): 12.48

Characteristics
- Type: (R')SB0/a(rs)
- Size: 99,300 ly (30,440 pc) (Note: 2MASS K_{s} values used.)
- Apparent size (V): 2.450′ × 1.666′

Other designations
- MGC-07-27-048, PGC 46023

NGC 5026 is a barred spiral galaxy or lenticular galaxy in the constellation of Centaurus. It was discovered on 5 June 1834 by John Herschel. It was described as "pretty bright, pretty large, round, gradually brighter middle" by John Louis Emil Dreyer, the compiler of the New General Catalogue.

== Supernova ==
One supernova has been observed in NGC 5026: SN 2009ev (Type Ia, mag. 14.6) was discovered by C. Jacques, C. Colesanti, E. Pimentel, and T. Napoleao on 27 May 2009.
