= NGC 5533 =

Galaxy in the constellation Boötes

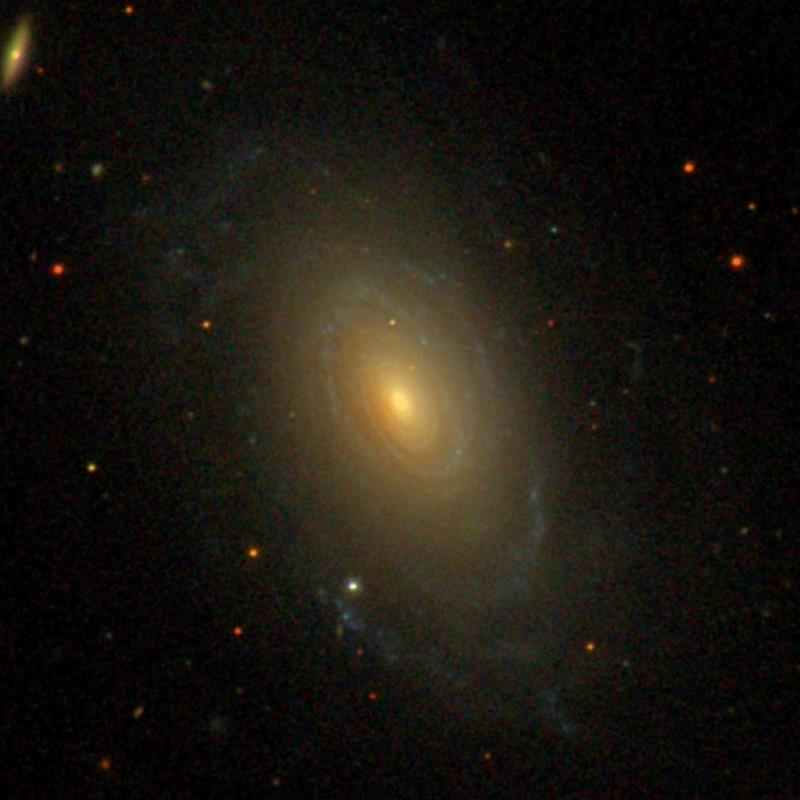
- SDSS image of NGC 5533

Observation data (J2000 epoch)
- Constellation: Boötes
- Right ascension: 14^{h} 16^{m} 07.74475^{s}
- Declination: +35° 20′ 37.7796″
- Redshift: 0.01282
- Heliocentric radial velocity: 3818 km/s
- Distance: 177 Mly (54.3 Mpc)
- Group or cluster: NGC 5557 Group
- Apparent magnitude (V): 11.81
- Apparent magnitude (B): 12.68

Characteristics
- Type: SA(rs)ab

Other designations
- UGC 9133, MCG +06-31-089, PGC 50973

NGC 5533 is an unbarred spiral galaxy in the constellation Boötes. It was discovered by the astronomer William Herschel on May 1, 1785. It has a regular structure, with one tightly wound spiral; its disk is inclined about 53 degrees towards the line of sight.

It is a member of the NGC 5557 Group, along with several other galaxies.

== Gallery ==
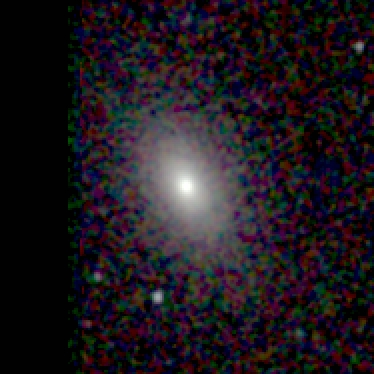
NGC 5533 (2MASS)
