= NGC 5164 =

Barred spiral galaxy in the constellation Ursa Major

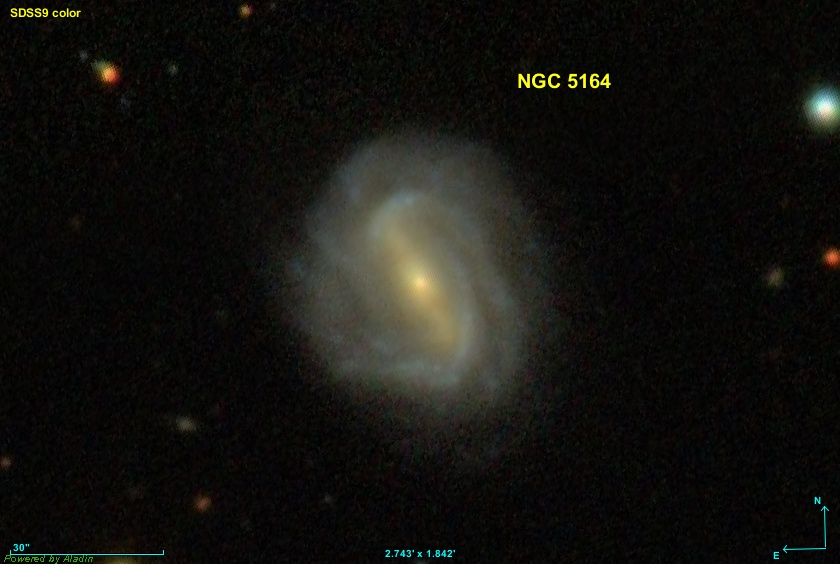
- NGC 5164 imaged by SDSS

Observation data (J2000 epoch)
- Constellation: Ursa Major
- Right ascension: 13^{h} 27^{m} 11.9191^{s}
- Declination: +55° 29′ 14.214″
- Redshift: 0.024011±0.0000125
- Heliocentric radial velocity: 7,198±4 km/s
- Distance: 352.8 ± 24.7 Mly (108.18 ± 7.57 Mpc)
- Apparent magnitude (V): 14.1

Characteristics
- Type: SBb
- Apparent size (V): 1.3′ × 1.0′

Other designations
- IRAS F13252+5544, 2MASX J13271189+5529135, UGC 8458, MCG +09-22-063, PGC 47124, CGCG 271-041

NGC 5164 is a barred spiral galaxy in the constellation Ursa Major. Its velocity with respect to the cosmic microwave background is 7,335±10 km/s, which corresponds to a Hubble distance of 352.8 ± 24.7 Mly (108.18 ± 7.57 Mpc). It was discovered by William Herschel on 14 April 1789.

== Supernova ==
One supernova has been observed in NGC 5164: SN 2011em (Type Ia, mag. 16.8) was discovered by Masaki Tsuboi on 4 August 2011.
