= NGC 5331 =

Galaxy pair in the constellation Virgo

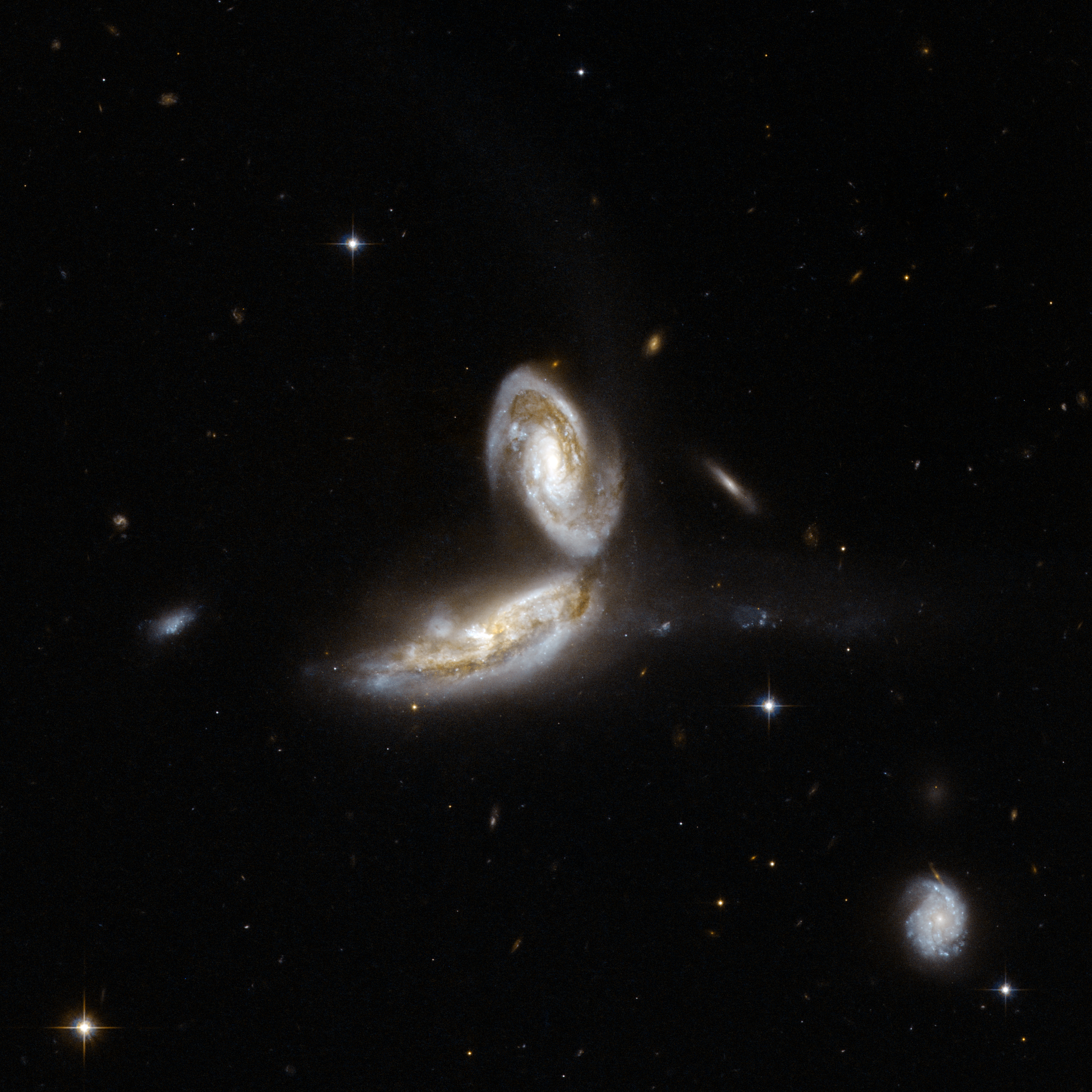
- NGC 5331 imaged by the Hubble Space Telescope

Observation data (J2000 epoch)
- Constellation: Virgo
- Right ascension: 13^{h} 52^{m} 16^{s}
- Declination: +02° 06′ 04″
- Redshift: 0.033043
- Heliocentric radial velocity: 9906 ± 6 km/s
- Apparent magnitude (V): 14.3

Characteristics
- Type: Sb pec:;LIRG HII

Other designations
- NGC 5331, UGC 8774, LEDA 49264, MCG+00-35-022

NGC 5331 is a pair of two interacting spiral galaxies in the constellation Virgo. They were discovered by German-British astronomer William Herschel on May 13, 1793.

== Supernova ==
One supernova has been observed in NGC 5331:

- SN 2020abir (Type Ia, mag. 17.2877), was discovered by the Zwicky Transient Facility on 1 December 2020.
