= NGC 5050 =

Lenticular galaxy in the constellation Virgo

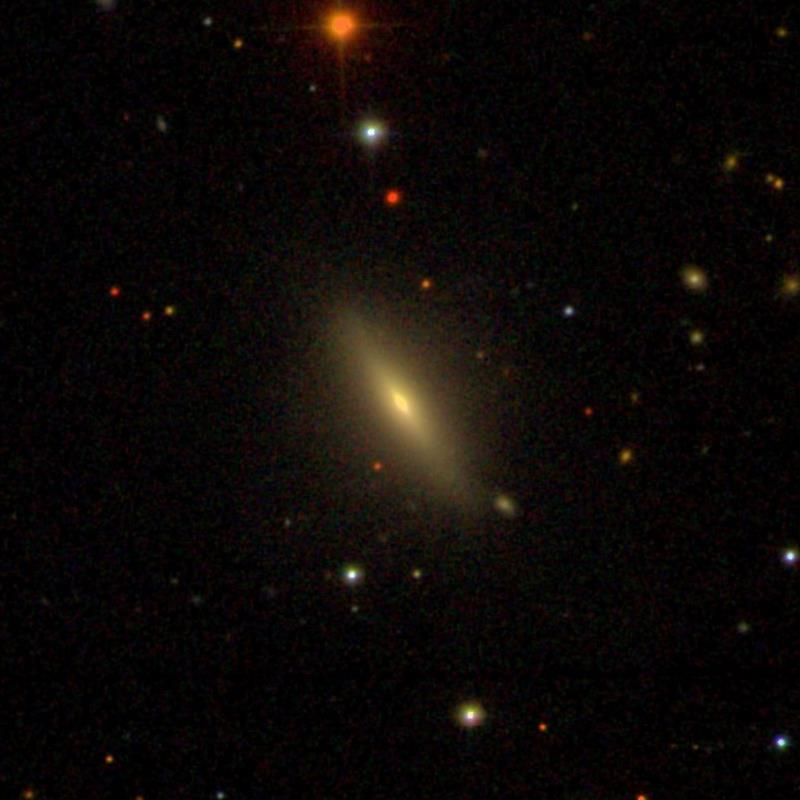
- NGC5050 - SDSS DR14.

Observation data (J2000 epoch)
- Constellation: Virgo
- Right ascension: 13^{h} 15^{m} 41^{s}
- Declination: +02° 52′ 44″
- Redshift: 0.0197
- Distance: 271 Mly

Characteristics
- Type: S0-a
- Apparent size (V): 1.1′ × 24′

Other designations
- CGCG 44-43, MCG 1-34-12, PGC 46138, UGC 8329.

NGC 5050 is a lenticular galaxy in the constellation Virgo. It was discovered by a German astronomer Albert Marth on April 30, 1864. It is also known as CGCG 44-43, MCG 1-34-12, PGC 46138, UGC 8329.

Marth discovered it in Malta with the help of Lassel's 48" reflector. It is faint, small and stellar with an apparent magnitude of 1.4.

== See also ==
- New General Catalogue
- Spiral galaxy
