= NGC 5223 =

Elliptical galaxy in constellation Canes Venatici

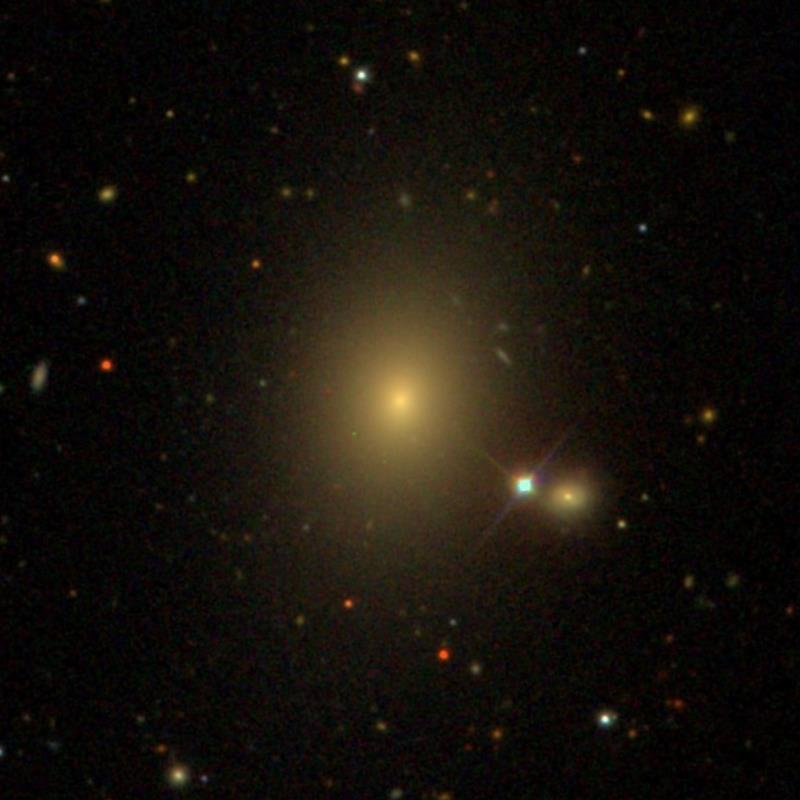
- SDSS image of NGC 5223

Observation data (J2000 epoch)
- Constellation: Canes Venatici
- Right ascension: 13^{h} 34^{m} 25.243^{s}
- Declination: +34° 41′ 25.53″
- Redshift: 0.024033
- Heliocentric radial velocity: 7205 km/s
- Distance: 291.91 ± 76.11 Mly (89.500 ± 23.335 Mpc)
- Apparent magnitude (B): 14.4

Characteristics
- Type: E
- Size: 160,000 ly (48,000 pc) (Note: r (SDSS Isophotal) values used.)
- Apparent size (V): 1.5′ × 1.3′

Other designations
- UGC 8553, MGC+06-30-040, PGC 47822

NGC 5223 is an elliptical galaxy in the constellation of Canes Venatici. It was discovered on 1 May 1785 by William Herschel.
