= HD 134064 =

Triple star system in the constellation Boötes

Observation data Epoch J2000 Equinox J2000
- Constellation: Boötes
- Right ascension: 15^{h} 07^{m} 20.369^{s}
- Declination: +18° 26′ 30.57″
- Apparent magnitude (V): 6.03

Characteristics
- Spectral type: A3Vnn
- U−B color index: +0.06
- B−V color index: +0.06

Astrometry
Radial velocity (R_{v})	−7.0 km/s
Proper motion (μ)	RA: +42.368 mas/yr Dec.: −49.682 mas/yr
Parallax (π)	13.2096±0.0324 mas
Distance	246.9 ± 0.6 ly (75.7 ± 0.2 pc)
Absolute magnitude (M_{V})	+1.74

Orbit
Period (P)	8.0 yr
Semi-major axis (a)	0.10″
Eccentricity (e)	0.45
Inclination (i)	122.6°
Longitude of the node (Ω)	41.3°
Periastron epoch (T)	B 1939.97
Argument of periastron (ω) (secondary)	71.4°

Details

HD 134064 A
Mass	2.15 M_{☉}
Luminosity	16 L_{☉}
Surface gravity (log g)	4.25 cgs
Temperature	9,732±331 K
Rotational velocity (v sin i)	185 km/s
Age	160 Myr

HD 134064 B
Mass	0.73 M_{☉}

Other designations
- BD+19°2924, HD 134064, HIP 74000, HR 5633, SAO 101379, WDS J15073+1827AB

Database references
SIMBAD	data

HD 134064 is a triple star system in the northern constellation of Boötes. It is faintly visible to the naked eye with a combined apparent visual magnitude of 6.03. This system is located at a distance of 247 light years from the Sun based on parallax measurements, but is drifting closer with a radial velocity of –7.0 km/s.

HD 134064 can be resolved into two stars 110″ apart. The brighter primary is itself a close binary that has not been resolved into individual stars.

The two inner components of this system are orbiting each other with a period of eight years and a high orbital eccentricity of 0.45. The pair are separated by an orbital distance of around 8,000 AU. The primary component is a rapidly rotating A-type main sequence star with a stellar classification of A3Vnn. It has 2.15 times the mass of the Sun and is spinning with a projected rotational velocity of 185 km/s. The secondary star has 73% of the Sun's mass. The system is young, with an estimated age of 160 million years.

The fainter resolved component C is magnitude 11.39 and is less massive than the Sun.
