= NGC 5501 =

Galaxy in the constellation Virgo

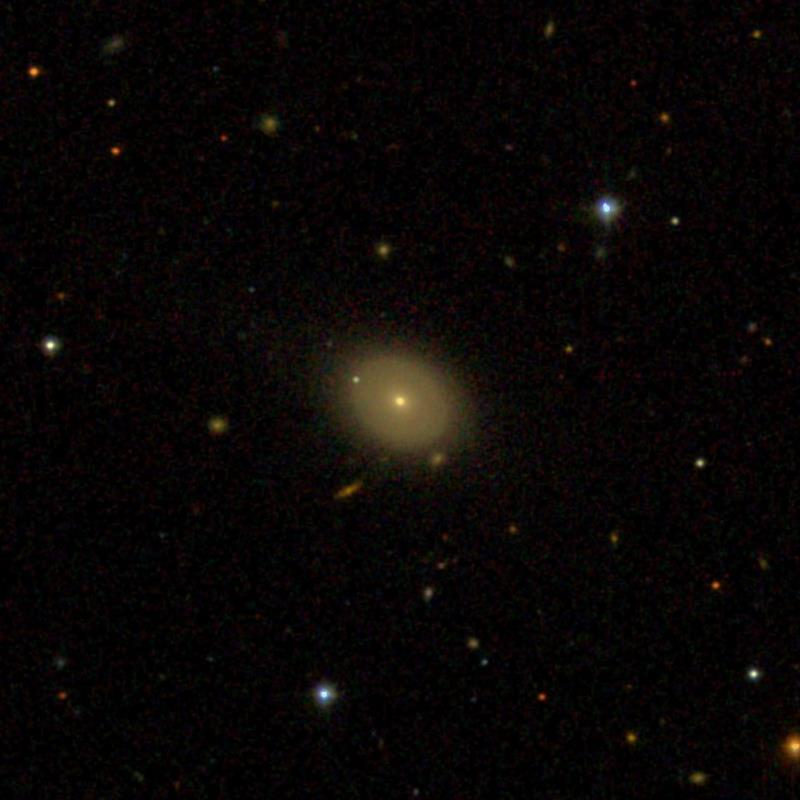
- SDSS image of NGC 5501

Observation data (J2000 epoch)
- Constellation: Virgo
- Right ascension: 14^{h} 12^{m} 20.2^{s}
- Declination: +1° 16′ 21.1″
- Redshift: 0.02517
- Heliocentric radial velocity: 7451 km/s
- Galactocentric velocity: 7521 km/s
- Distance: 336 ± 23.5 Mly (103 ± 7.2 Mpc)
- Apparent magnitude (V): 14.9
- Absolute magnitude (V): -20.2 (Note: Calculated from Galactocentric GSR Distance modulus)

Characteristics
- Type: (R')SA(r)0+?
- Apparent size (V): 0.78' x 0.62'

Other designations
- MCG +00-36-027, PGC 50724

NGC 5501 is an unbarred spiral galaxy in the constellation of Virgo, registered in New General Catalogue (NGC).

== Observation history ==
NGC 5501 was discovered by John Herschel on 13 April 1828. John Louis Emil Dreyer in the New General Catalogue, described the galaxy as "very faint, small, partially resolved, some stars seen".
