= NGC 5837 =

Galaxy in the constellation Boötes

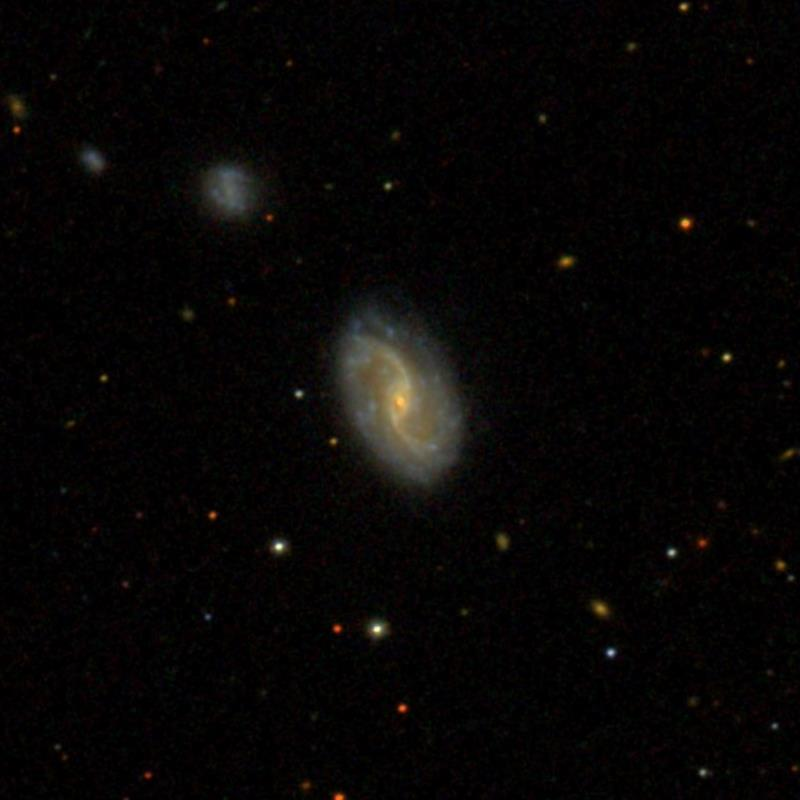
- SDSS image of NGC 5837

Observation data (J2000 epoch)
- Constellation: Boötes
- Right ascension: 15^{h} 04^{m} 40.6^{s}
- Declination: +12° 38′ 00″
- Redshift: 0.028723
- Distance: 363.3 ± 58.3 Mly (111.4 ± 17.9 Mpc)
- Apparent magnitude (V): 14.5

Characteristics
- Type: SB(s)b
- Apparent size (V): 1.0' × 0.6'

Other designations
- UGC 09686, PGC 053817.

NGC 5837 is a barred spiral galaxy in the constellation Boötes. It was discovered on 19 June 1887 by Lewis A. Swift.

== Supernovae ==
Two supernovae have been observed in NGC 5837:

- SN 2014ac (Type Ia, mag. 16.6) was discovered by the Italian Supernovae Search Project (ISSP) on 9 March 2014.
- SN 2015Z (Type IIn, mag. 17.5) was discovered by Ron Arbour on 16 June 2015.
