= NGC 5502 =

Galaxy within the constellation Ursa Major

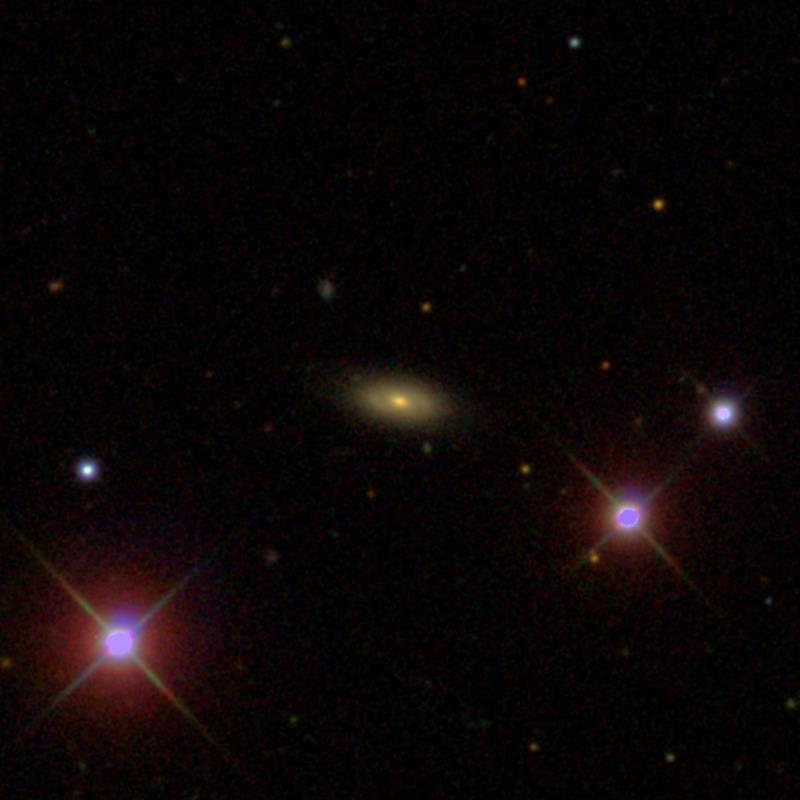
- SDSS image of NGC 5502

Observation data (J2000 epoch)
- Constellation: Ursa Major
- Right ascension: 14^{h} 09^{m} 33.9^{s}
- Declination: +60° 24′ 34.3″
- Redshift: 0.02940
- Heliocentric radial velocity: 8684 km/s
- Galactocentric velocity: 8949 km/s
- Distance: 400 ± 28 Mly (122.6 ± 8.6 Mpc)
- Apparent magnitude (V): 15.9
- Absolute magnitude (V): -19.5 (Note: Calculated from Galactocentric GSR Distance modulus)

Characteristics
- Type: Sa D
- Apparent size (V): 0.63' x 0.29'

Other designations
- MCG +10-20-077, PGC 50508

NGC 5502 (also known as NGC 5503) is a spiral galaxy in the constellation of Ursa Major, registered in New General Catalogue (NGC).

== Observation history ==
NGC 5502 was discovered by Edward Swift (father) on 9 May 1885 and later double listed by Lewis Swift (son) two days later on 11 May 1885 as NGC 5503. They gave descriptions "between two stars, one a wide double" and "forms with two stars a right triangle" respectively. In the New General Catalogue, John Louis Emil Dreyer described the galaxy as "most extremely faint, very small, round, very difficult, 2 stars near". The apparent difference in positions (2 arcmin) could have caused the confusions between NGC 5502 and NGC 5503.
