= NGC 5343 =

Elliptical galaxy in the constellation Virgo

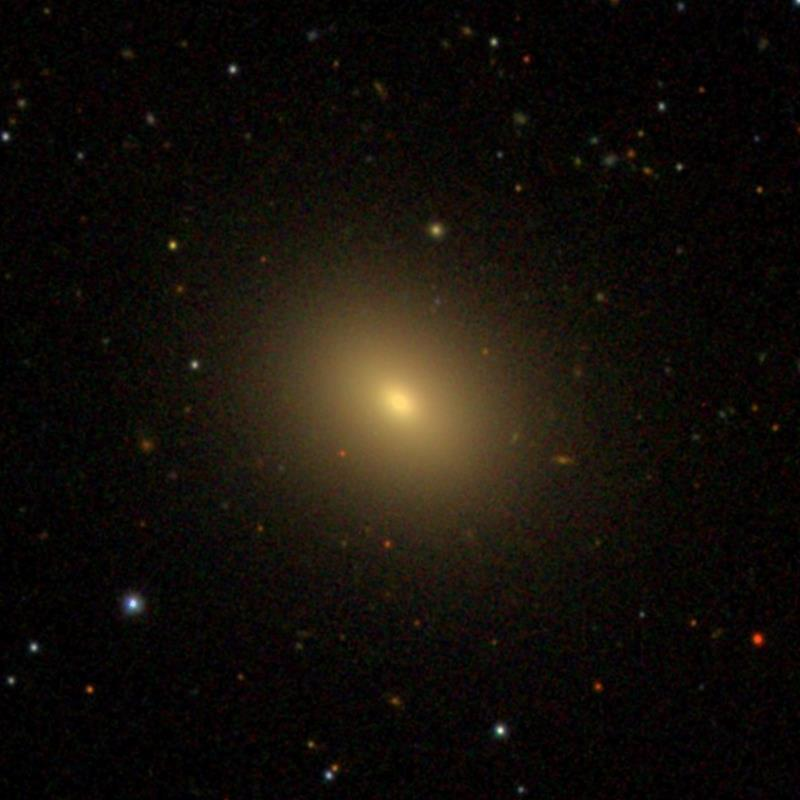
- SDSS image of NGC 5343

Observation data (J2000 epoch)
- Constellation: Virgo
- Right ascension: 13^{h} 54^{m} 11.700^{s}
- Declination: −07° 35′ 17.20″
- Redshift: 0.008806
- Heliocentric radial velocity: 2640 km/s
- Apparent magnitude (B): 14

Characteristics
- Type: SA0^{−}(r)?
- Size: 56,500 ly (17,320 pc) (Note: RC3 D_{25}; R_{25} (blue) values used.)
- Apparent size (V): 1.5′ × 1.2′

Other designations
- MGC-01-35-019, PGC 49412

NGC 5343 is an elliptical galaxy in the constellation of Virgo. It was discovered on 5 May 1785 by William Herschel.
