= NGC 5003 =

Galaxy in the constellation of Canes Venatici

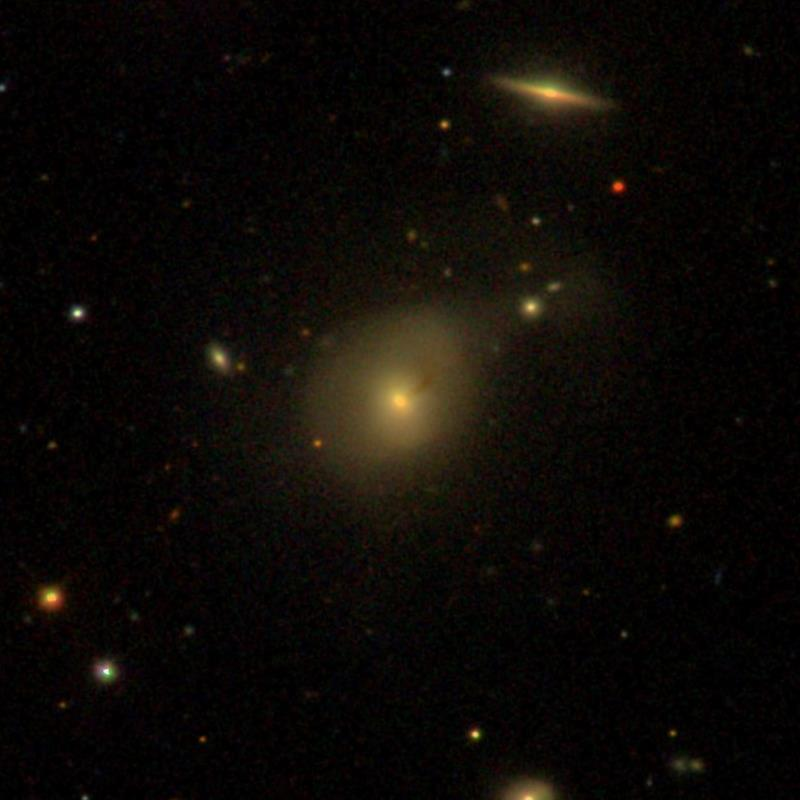
- SDSS image of NGC 5003

Observation data (J2000 epoch)
- Constellation: Canes Venatici
- Right ascension: 13^{h} 08^{m} 37^{s}
- Declination: 43° 44′ 13″
- Redshift: 0.0356
- Distance: 490 Mly

Characteristics
- Type: Sa
- Apparent size (V): 1′ × 48′

Other designations
- CGCG 217-13, MCG 7-27-33, PGC 45559, and UGC 8228.

NGC 5003 is a spiral galaxy in the constellation Canes Venatici. The celestial object was discovered on April 9, 1787, by the German-British astronomer William Herschel.
