= NGC 5266 =

Lenticular galaxy in the constellation Centaurus

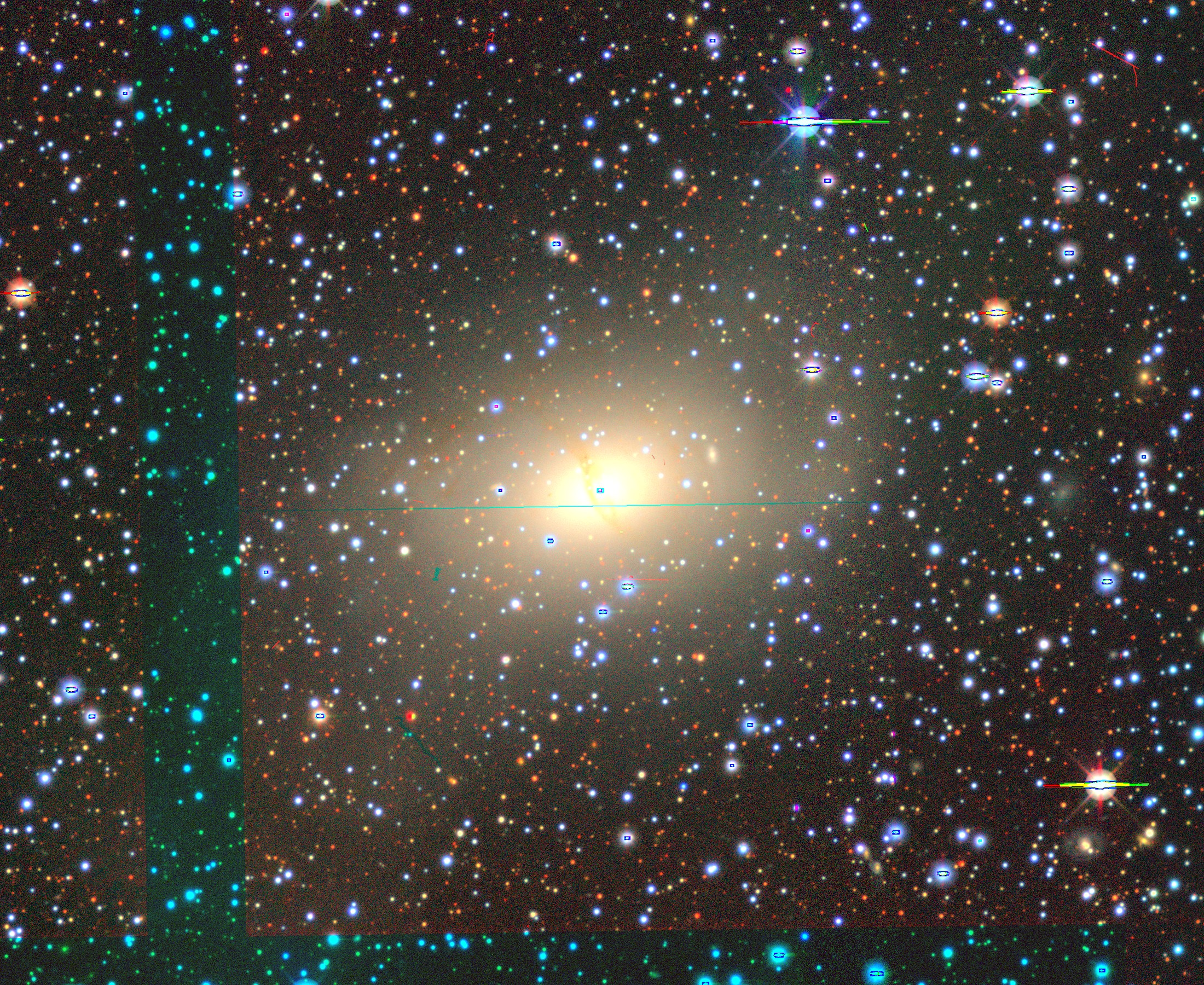
- NGC 5266 imaged by Legacy Surveys

Observation data (J2000.0 epoch)
- Constellation: Centaurus
- Right ascension: 13^{h} 43^{m} 02^{s}
- Declination: −48° 10′ 09″
- Redshift: 0.010014
- Heliocentric radial velocity: 3002 ± 6
- Distance: 138 million LY
- Apparent magnitude (V): 11.14

Characteristics
- Type: E-S0
- Apparent size (V): 3.30 x 2.3

Other designations
- PGC 48593

NGC 5266 is a lenticular galaxy in the constellation Centaurus. It's classified as a type E-S0 galaxy. It was first discovered in 1834 by astronomer John Herschel. The galaxy's radial velocity, relative to the cosmic microwave background is measured at around 3230 ± 17 km/s, corresponding to a Hubble distance of around 47.64 ± 3.35 MPC.
