= NGC 5601 =

Galaxy in the constellation Boötes

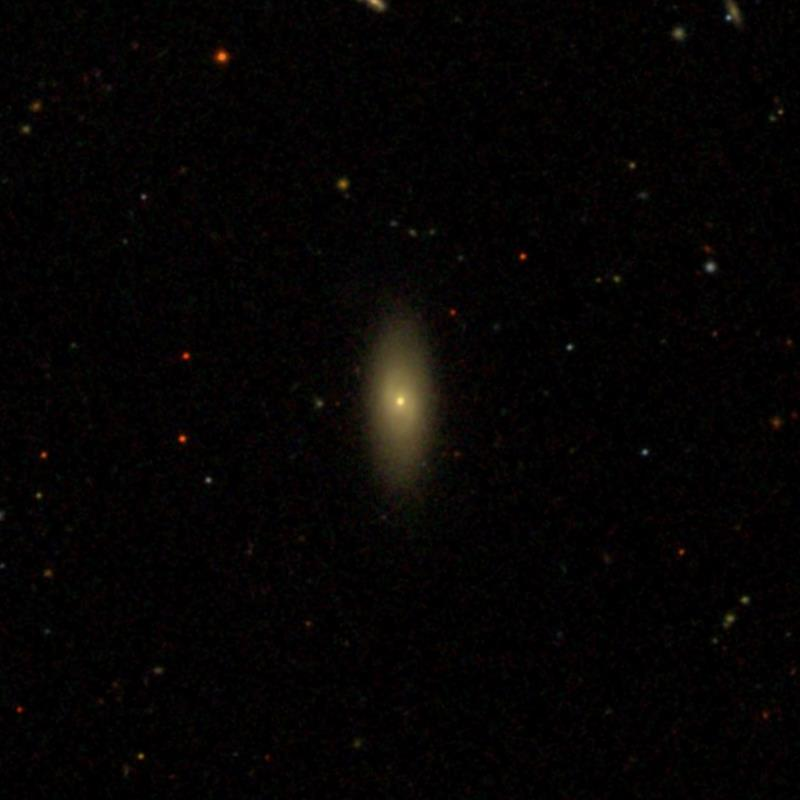
- A Sloan Digital Sky Survey (SDSS) image of NGC 5601

Observation data (J2000 epoch)
- Constellation: Boötes
- Right ascension: 14^{h} 22^{m} 53.20^{s}
- Declination: +40° 18′ 34.0″
- Redshift: 0.017487 ± 8.86e-6
- Distance: 259 Mly (79.68 Mpc)
- Apparent magnitude (V): 14.7

Characteristics
- Type: Sa
- Size: 88,000 ly
- Apparent size (V): 0.813′ x 0.316′
- Notable features: N/A

Other designations
- 2MASX J14225329+4018344, PGC 51370, MCG+07-30-006, LEDA 51370

NGC 5601 is a lenticular galaxy around 259 million light-years away in the constellation Boötes. NGC 5601 was discovered on March 27th, 1867 by the Irish astronomer Robert Ball, and it has a diameter around 88,000 light-years. NGC 5601 is not known to have much star formation, and it is not known to have an active galactic nucleus.
