= NGC 5034 =

Spiral galaxy in the constellation Ursa Minor

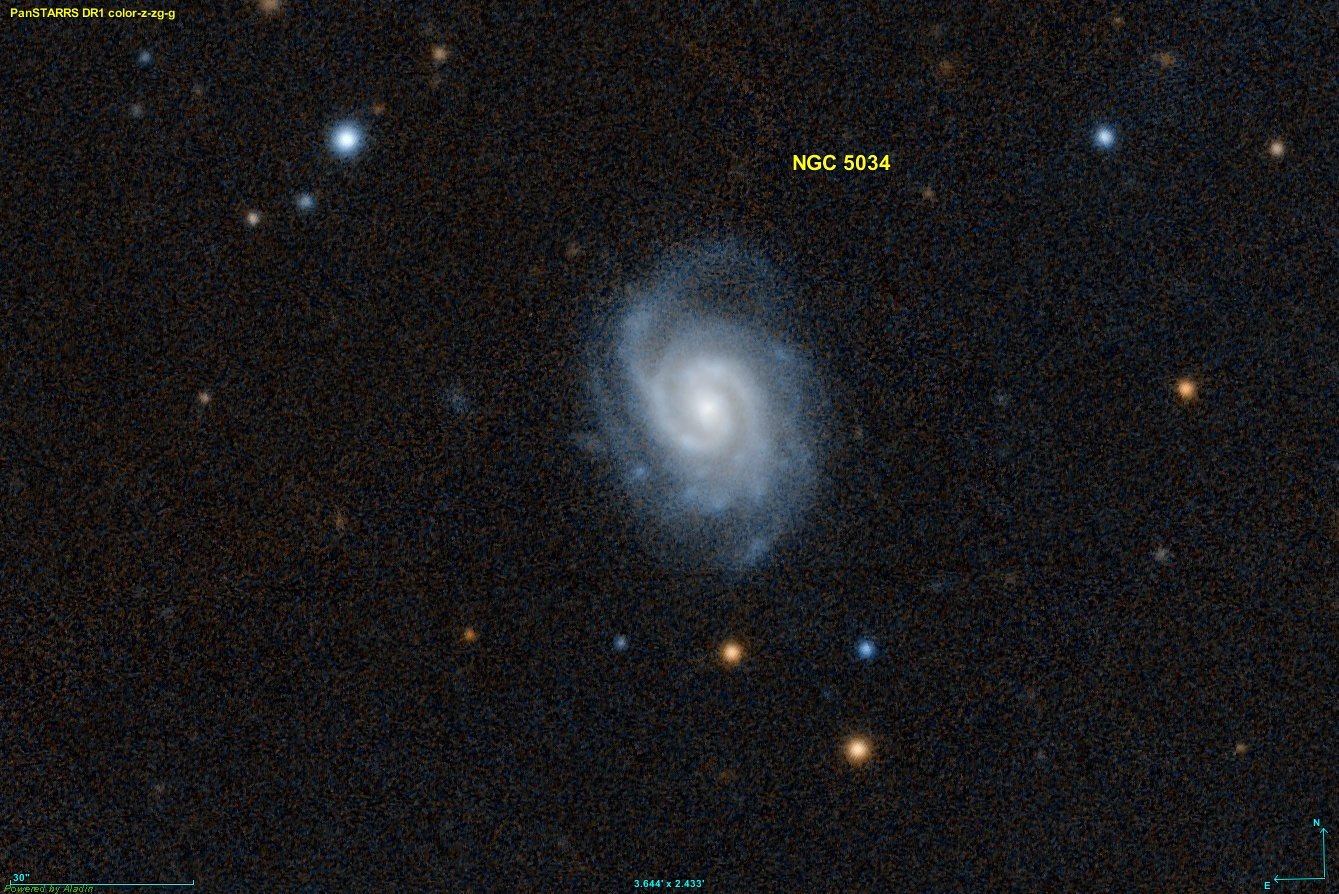

Observation data (J2000 epoch)
- Constellation: Ursa Minor
- Right ascension: 13^{h} 12^{m} 19.01200^{s}
- Declination: +70° 38′ 57.5408″
- Redshift: 0.028983
- Heliocentric radial velocity: 8563 km/s
- Distance: 401.5 Mly (123.11 Mpc)
- Apparent magnitude (B): 14.06

Characteristics
- Type: Sbc

Other designations
- UGC 8295, MCG +12-13-001, PGC 45859

NGC 5034 is a spiral galaxy in the constellation of Ursa Minor. NGC 5034 is its New General Catalogue designation. It is located about 401 million light-years (123 Mpc) from the Sun. It was discovered on April 7, 1793, by William Herschel.
