= NGC 5201 =

Spiral galaxy in the constellation Ursa Major

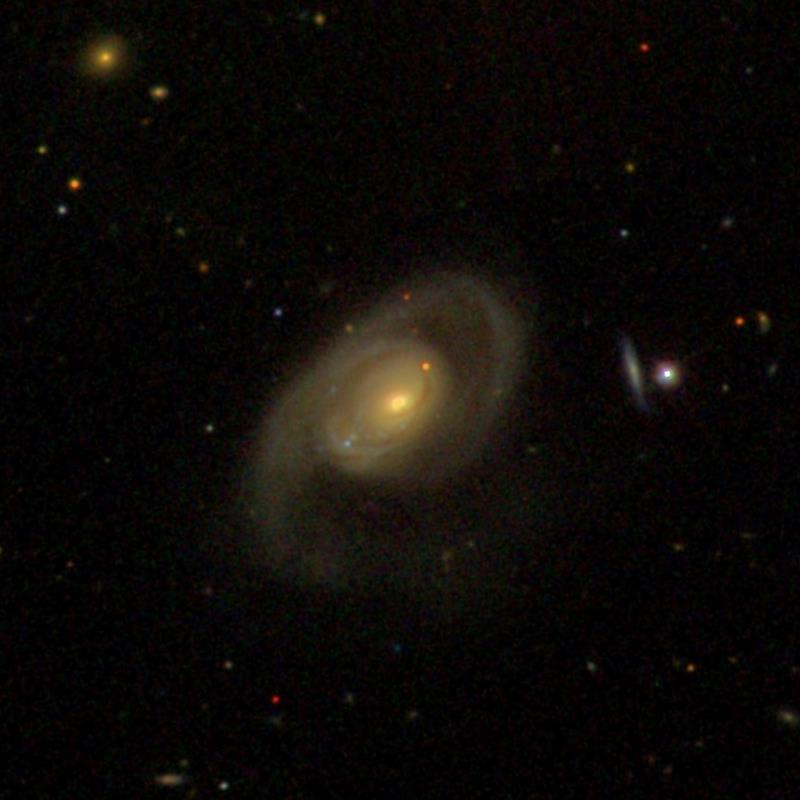
- SDSS image of NGC 5201

Observation data (J2000 epoch)
- Constellation: Ursa Major
- Right ascension: 13^{h} 29^{m} 16.212^{s}
- Declination: +53° 04′ 55.14″
- Redshift: 0.02909
- Heliocentric radial velocity: 8594 km/s
- Distance: 408.8 Mly (125.34 Mpc)

Characteristics
- Type: Sb

Other designations
- UGC 8480, MCG +09-22-069, PGC 47324

NGC 5201 is a spiral galaxy located in the constellation Ursa Major. It was discovered on April 14, 1789 by German-born British astronomer William Herschel. It is about 384 million light years away.
