= NGC 5690 =

Galaxy in the constellation Leo Minor

- NGC 5690 imaged by SDSS

Observation data (J2000 epoch)
- Constellation: Virgo
- Right ascension: 14^{h} 37^{m} 41.0745^{s}
- Declination: +02° 17′ 27.643″
- Redshift: 0.005844±0.00000200
- Heliocentric radial velocity: 1,752±1 km/s
- Distance: 61.30 ± 2.52 Mly (18.796 ± 0.773 Mpc)
- Group or cluster: NGC 5746 group (LGG 386)
- Apparent magnitude (V): 12.7g

Characteristics
- Type: Sc? edge-on
- Size: ~64,200 ly (19.68 kpc) (estimated)
- Apparent size (V): 2.35′ × 0.96′

Other designations
- IRAS 14351+0230, 2MASX J14374107+0217274, UGC 9416, MCG +00-37-019, PGC 52273, CGCG 019-072

NGC 5690 is an edge-on spiral galaxy in the constellation of Virgo. Its velocity with respect to the cosmic microwave background is 1,980±16 km/s, which corresponds to a Hubble distance of 95.2 ± 6.7 Mly (29.20 ± 2.06 Mpc). However, 23 non-redshift measurements give a much closer mean distance of 61.30 ± 2.52 Mly (18.796 ± 0.773 Mpc). It was discovered by German-British astronomer William Herschel on 30 April 1786.

NGC 5690 has a possible active galactic nucleus, i.e. it has a compact region at the center of a galaxy that emits a significant amount of energy across the electromagnetic spectrum, with characteristics indicating that this luminosity is not produced by the stars.

== NGC 5746 group ==
NGC 5690 is a member of the NGC 5746 group (also known as LGG 386). This group has at least 31 members, including NGC 5636, NGC 5638, NGC 5658, NGC 5668, NGC 5691, NGC 5692, NGC 5701, NGC 5705, NGC 5713, NGC 5719, NGC 5725, NGC 5740, NGC 5746, NGC 5750, IC 1022, IC 1024, and IC 1048. The NGC 5719 group is part of the Virgo III cluster, one of the clusters in the Virgo Supercluster.

== Supernovae ==
Two supernovae have been observed in NGC 5690:

- SN 2017aym (Type II-P, mag. 18.66) was discovered by Gaia Photometric Science Alerts on 13 January 2017.
- SN 2024jlf (Type II, mag. 15.8768) was discovered by the Zwicky Transient Facility on 28 May 2024.

== See also ==
- List of NGC objects (5001–6000)
