= NGC 5719 =

Intermediate spiral galaxy in the constellation Virgo

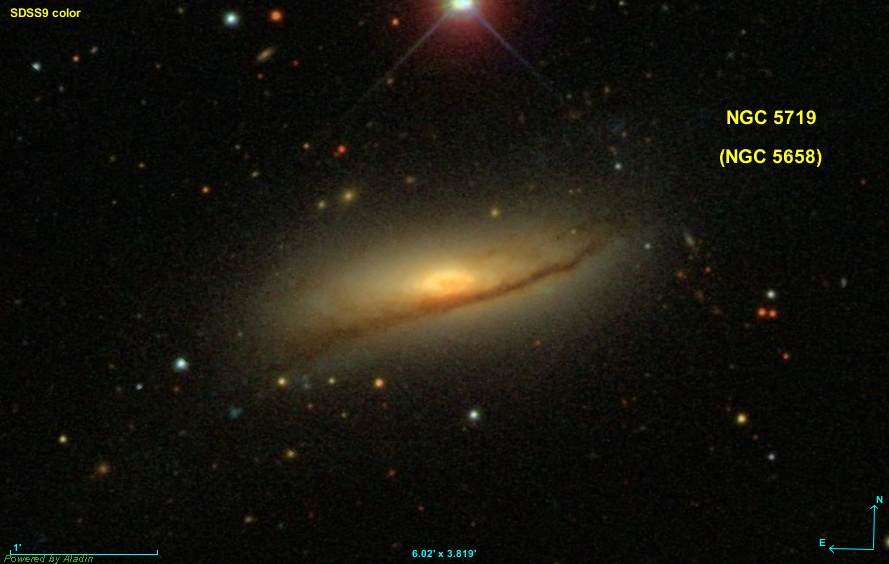
- The intermediate spiral galaxy NGC 5719.

Observation data (J2000 epoch)
- Constellation: Virgo
- Right ascension: 14^{h} 40^{m} 56.37^{s}
- Declination: −00° 19′ 05.78″
- Redshift: 0.005781
- Heliocentric radial velocity: 1,733 km/s
- Distance: 94.2 Mly (28.89 Mpc)
- Apparent magnitude (V): 12.8g

Characteristics
- Type: SAB(s)ab pec
- Size: 26.68 kiloparsecs (87,000 light-years) (diameter; 2MASS K-band total isophote)

Other designations
- NGC 5658, UGC 9462, PGC 52455, IRAS 14383-0006, MCG +00-37-024, CGCG 019-079

NGC 5719 is an intermediate or barred spiral galaxy located in the constellation Virgo. It is located at a distance of 94 million light years from Earth. It was first discovered by William Herschel in April 1787, but also observed by John Herschel in April 1828 and by George Phillips Bond in March 1853, who catalogued the object as NGC 5658 under the New General Catalogue.

The luminosity class of NGC 5719 is I-II and it has a broad HI line. Additionally, it is a narrow line active galaxy (NLAGN). In far infrared (40-400 ɥm), the luminosity of NGC 5719 is 1.70 × 10^{10} L_{☉} (10^{10.23} L_{☉}) while its total luminosity in infrared (from the 8-1000 ɥm range) is 2.24 × 10 L_{☉} (10^{10.35} L_{☉}).

== Characteristics ==
NGC 5719 is classified as an Sab galaxy found almost edge-on. It is interacting with a nearby face-on Sbc companion, NGC 5713. The dust lane of the galaxy is tilted, as well as bent significantly and inclined to its major axis.

The galaxy has two HI tidal bridges which loop around it and are connecting with NGC 5713. There is a detection of two HI tidal tails leaving NGC 5713. Inside the disk of the galaxy (NGC 5719), ionized and neutral hydrogen are present. Both are counter-rotating in respect to the main stellar disk. When measuring the kinematics of both counter-rotating stellar disks and the ionized-gas disk, they extend by about 40 arcsec (4.3 kpc) from NGC 5719's center.

== NGC 5746 group ==
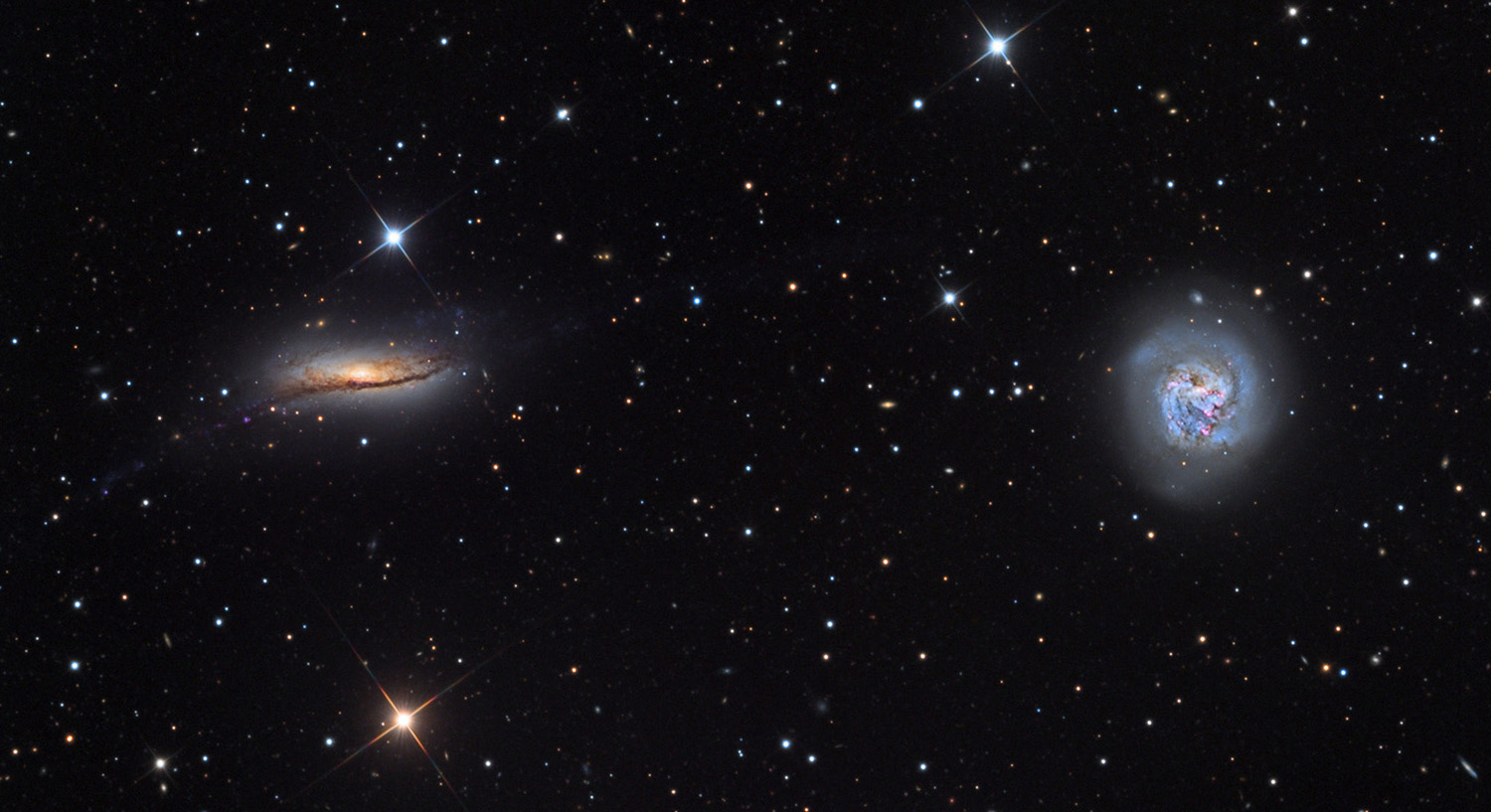
The galaxy pair NGC 5719 and NGC 5713 taken at Mount Lemmon Observatory/University of Arizona (Adam Block).

NGC 5719 is part of the NGC 5746 group according to A.M. Garcia. In this galaxy group there are 31 members including NGC 5636, NGC 5638, NGC 5668, NGC 5690, NGC 5691, NGC 5692, NGC 5701, NGC 5705, NGC 5713, NGC 5725, NGC 5740, NGC 5746, NGC 5750, IC 1022, IC 1024 and IC 1048. Together the NGC 5719 group is part of the Virgo III cluster, one of the clusters in the Virgo Supercluster.
