= NGC 5493 =

Galaxy in the constellation Virgo

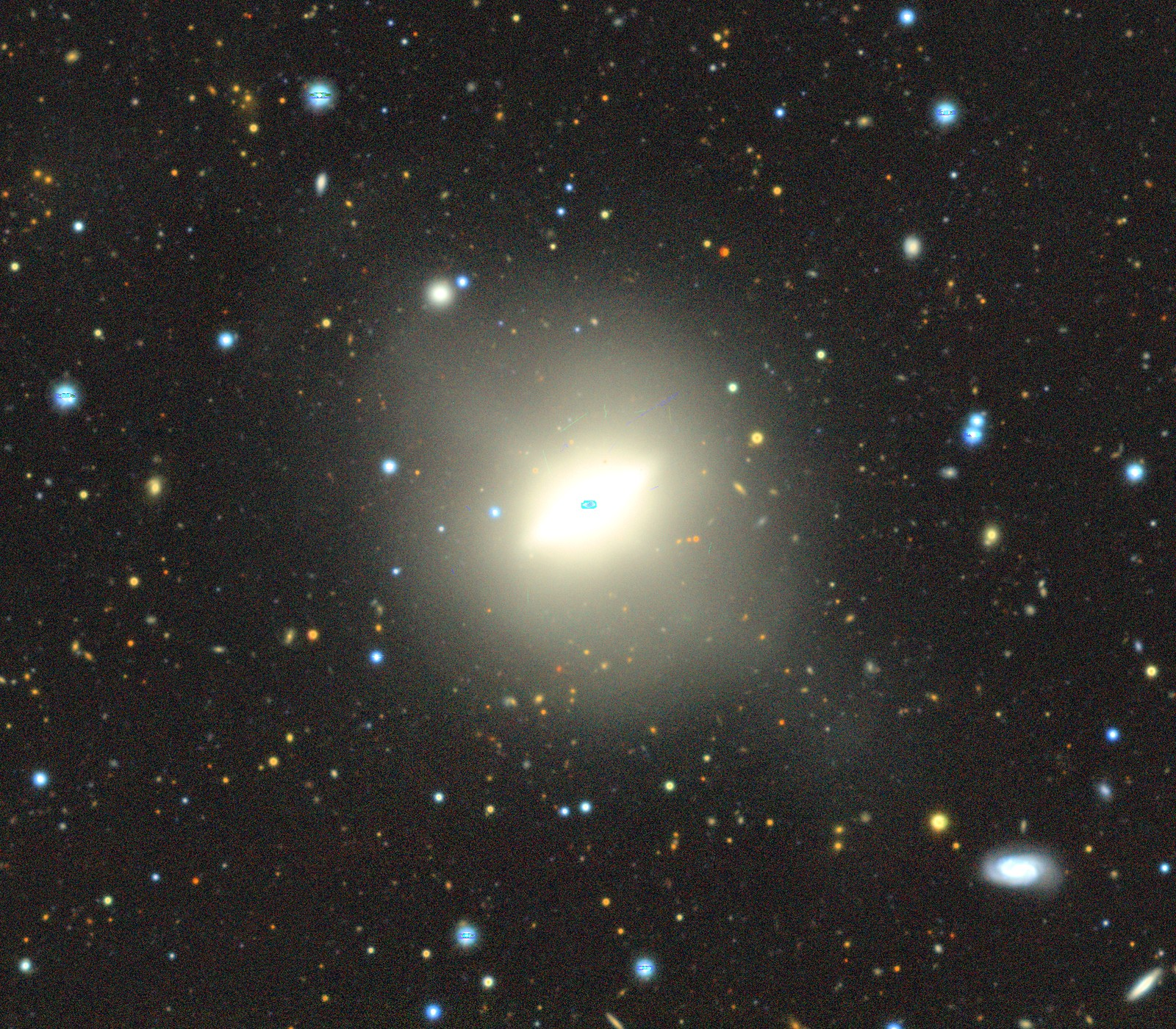
- NGC 5493 imaged by Legacy Surveys

Observation data (J2000 epoch)
- Constellation: Virgo
- Right ascension: 14^{h} 11^{m} 29.3824^{s}
- Declination: −05° 02′ 37.090″
- Redshift: 0.008889±0.0000170
- Heliocentric radial velocity: 2,665±5 km/s
- Distance: 64.73 ± 31.32 Mly (19.847 ± 9.602 Mpc)
- Group or cluster: NGC 5427 group (LGG 374)
- Apparent magnitude (V): 12.27

Characteristics
- Type: S0 pec edge-on
- Size: ~41,100 ly (12.60 kpc) (estimated)
- Apparent size (V): 1.6′ × 1.3′

Other designations
- 2MASX J14112938-0502371, UGCA 386, MCG -01-36-013, PGC 50670

NGC 5493 is a peculiar lenticular galaxy in the constellation of Virgo. Its velocity with respect to the cosmic microwave background is 2,929±19 km/s, which corresponds to a Hubble distance of 140.9 ± 9.9 Mly (43.20 ± 3.04 Mpc). However, three non-redshift measurements give a much closer mean distance of 64.73 ± 31.32 Mly (19.847 ± 9.602 Mpc). It was discovered by German-British astronomer William Herschel on 22 February 1787.

NGC 5493 has a possible active galactic nucleus, i.e. it has a compact region at the center of a galaxy that emits a significant amount of energy across the electromagnetic spectrum, with characteristics indicating that this luminosity is not produced by the stars.

== NGC 5427 group ==
According to A. M. Garcia, NGC 5493 is a member of the NGC 5427 group (also known as LGG 374). This galaxy group has at least four other members, including NGC 5426, NGC 5427, NGC 5468, and NGC 5472.

== Supernova ==
One supernova has been observed in NGC 5493:

- SN 1990M (Type Ia, mag. 13.5) was discovered by Robert Evans on 15 June 1990.

== See also ==
- List of NGC objects (5001–6000)
