= NGC 5774 =

Galaxy in the constellation Virgo

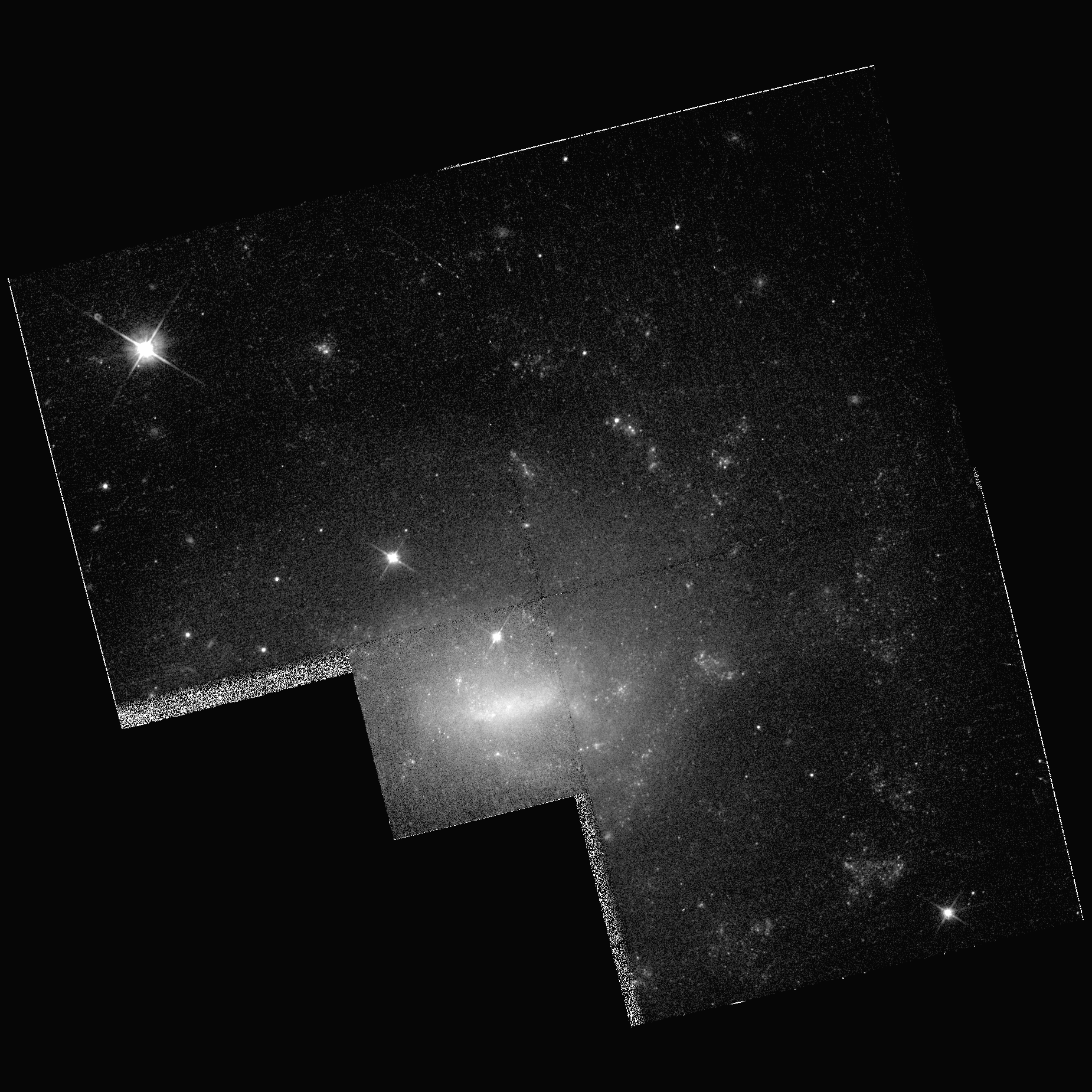
- NGC 5774 (NASA/ESA HST)

Observation data (J2000.0 epoch)
- Constellation: Virgo
- Right ascension: 14^{h} 53^{m} 42.46^{s}
- Declination: +03° 34′ 56.96″
- Redshift: 0.005187
- Heliocentric radial velocity: 1555 ± 2 km/s
- Distance: 71 Mly
- Apparent magnitude (V): 12.30
- Apparent magnitude (B): 13.00

Characteristics
- Type: SAB(rs)d
- Apparent size (V): 1.9 x 1.12

Other designations
- PGC 53231, MCG 1-38-13, UGC 9576

NGC 5774 is an intermediate spiral galaxy approximately 71 million light-years away from Earth in the constellation of Virgo. It was discovered by Irish engineer Bindon Stoney on April 26, 1851.

NGC 5774 belongs to the NGC 5775 Group of galaxies—together with nearby NGC 5775, IC 1070, and others—which is part of the Virgo III Groups strung out to the east of the Virgo Supercluster of galaxies. It has been classified as a "low surface brightness" (LSB) galaxy, but its central surface brightness is 5 times brighter than the brightest LSB galaxies. It has a multiple spiral pattern with bright blue knotty structure all along the arms.

It is an extremely low star forming galaxy with five X-ray sources plus three ultraluminous X-ray source candidates.

== Interaction with NGC 5775 ==
NGC 5774 is interacting with the nearby spiral galaxy NGC 5775 in the form of two connecting H I bridges through which the gas is travelling from NGC 5774 to NGC 5775. Faint optical emission, as well as radio continuum emission, are also present along the bridges. It is possible that star formation is occurring between the galaxies.

This system may be in the early stages of a merger.

== See also ==
- Intermediate spiral galaxy
- List of NGC objects (5001–6000)
- Low Surface Brightness galaxy

== Gallery ==
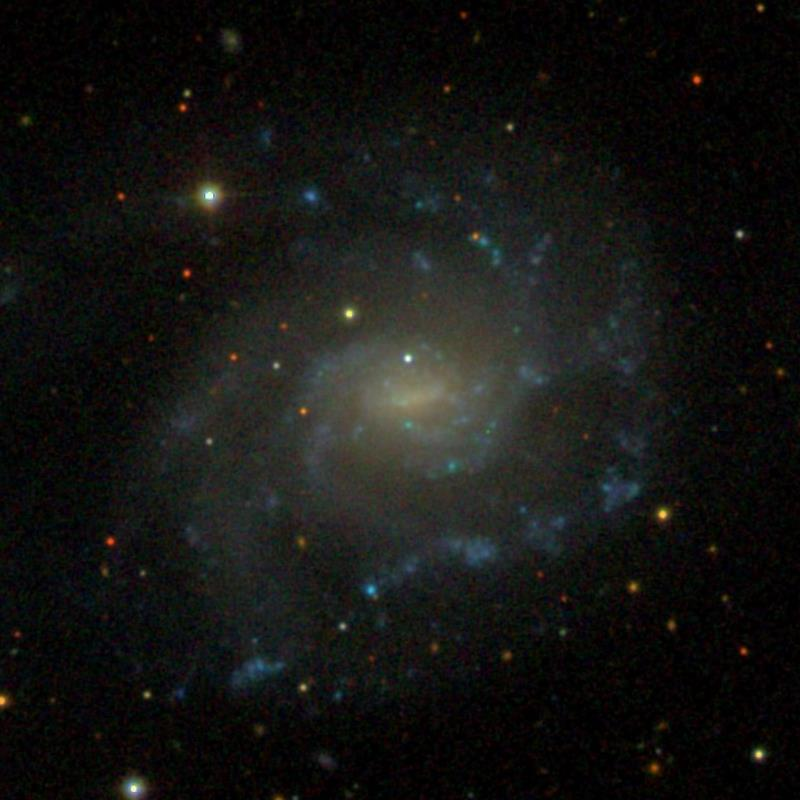
NGC 5774 (SDSS DR14)
