= NGC 5838 =

Galaxy in the constellation Virgo

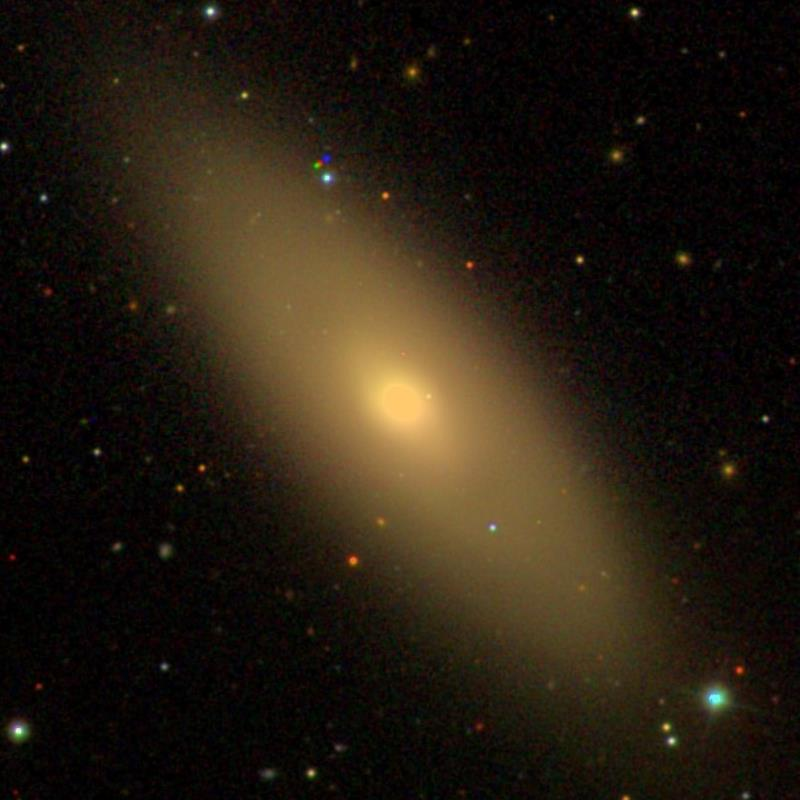
- SDSS image of NGC 5838

Observation data (J2000 epoch)
- Constellation: Virgo
- Right ascension: 15^{h} 5^{m} 26.2^{s}
- Declination: +2° 5′ 58″
- Redshift: 1359 ± 10 km/s
- Apparent magnitude (V): 11.9

Characteristics
- Type: SA0^{−}
- Apparent size (V): 4.2′ × 1.5′

Other designations
- UGC 9692, PGC 53862

NGC 5838 is a lenticular galaxy in the constellation Virgo, discovered by William Herschel in 1786. It is a member of the Virgo III Groups, a series of galaxies and galaxy clusters strung out to the east of the Virgo Supercluster of galaxies.
