= NGC 5470 =

Spiral galaxy in the constellation Virgo

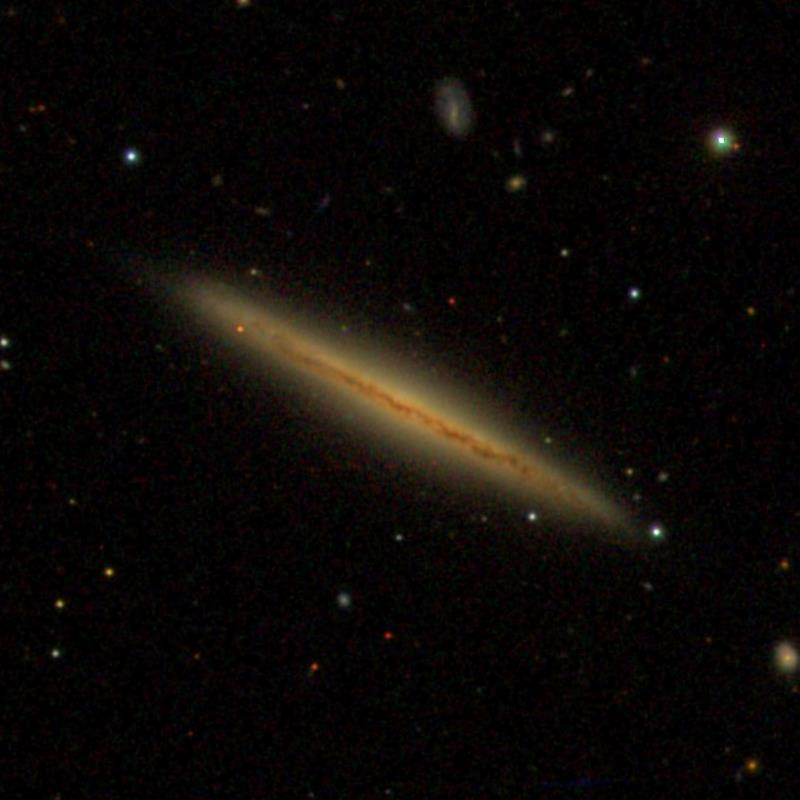
- SDSS image of NGC 5470

Observation data (J2000 epoch)
- Constellation: Virgo
- Right ascension: 14^{h} 06^{m} 31.999^{s}
- Declination: +06° 01′ 45.86″
- Redshift: 0.003412
- Heliocentric radial velocity: 1021 km/s
- Distance: 67.2 Mly (20.61 Mpc)
- Apparent magnitude (B): 14.24

Characteristics
- Type: Sb

Other designations
- UGC 9020, MCG +01-36-019, PGC 50317

NGC 5470 is an edge-on spiral galaxy located between 43 and 68 million light-years away in the constellation Virgo. It was discovered by astronomer John Herschel in 1830. It is a member of the Virgo III Groups, a series of galaxies and galaxy clusters strung out to the east of the Virgo Supercluster of galaxies.

== See also ==
- List of NGC objects (5001–6000)
- New General Catalogue
