= NGC 5775 =

Spiral galaxy in the constellation Virgo

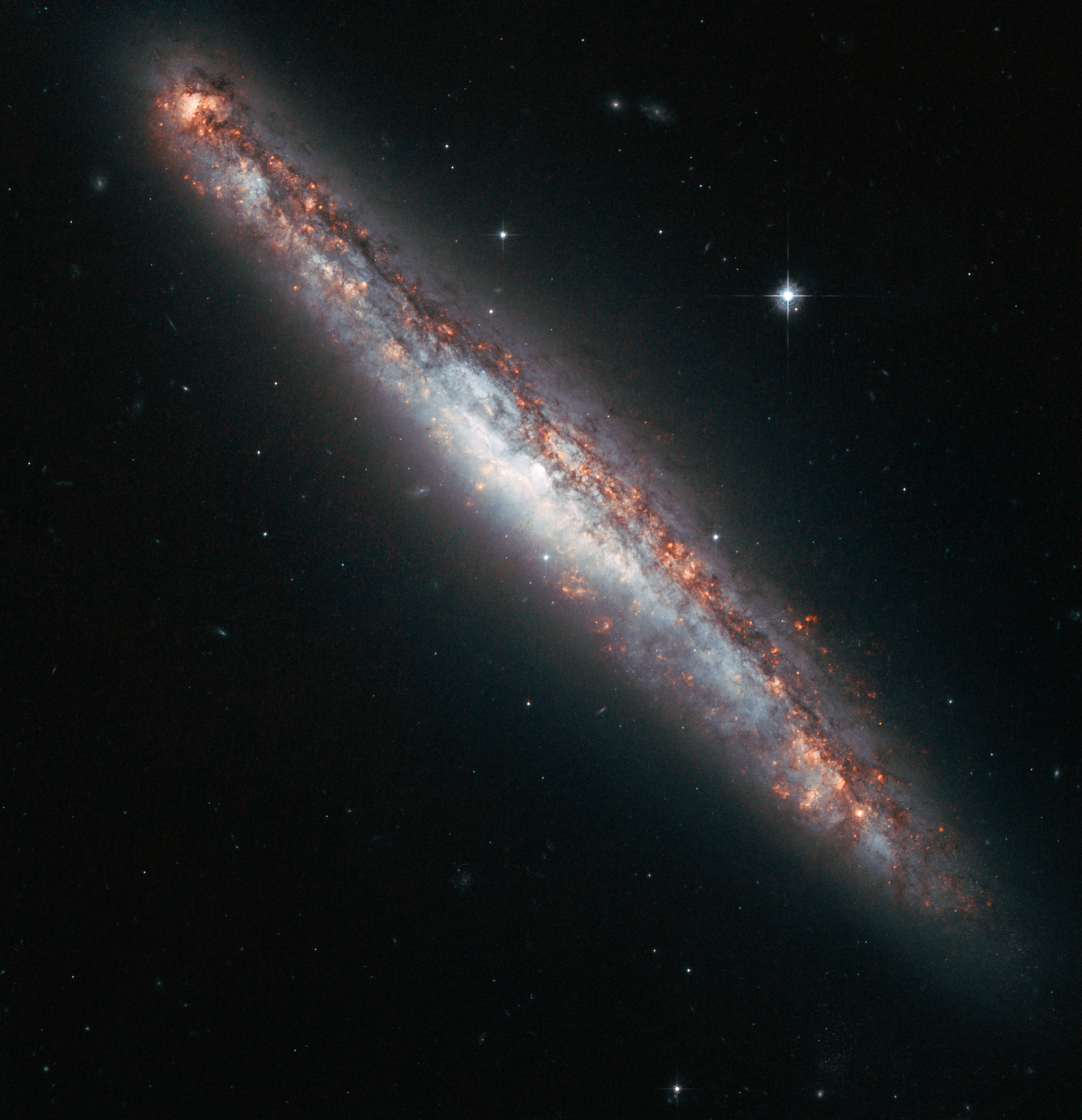
- NGC 5775 imaged by the Hubble Space Telescope, using the Advanced Camera for Surveys

Observation data (J2000 epoch)
- Constellation: Virgo
- Right ascension: 14^{h} 53^{m} 57.653^{s}
- Declination: +03° 32′ 40.10″
- Redshift: 0.005607
- Heliocentric radial velocity: 1681
- Distance: 66.33 ± 13.31 Mly (20.338 ± 4.081 Mpc)
- Group or cluster: Virgo Cluster
- Apparent magnitude (V): 11.34
- Apparent magnitude (B): 13.0

Characteristics
- Type: Sbc
- Apparent size (V): 3.967' × 0.793'

Other designations
- UGC 9579, MCG+01-38-014, PGC 53247

NGC 5775 is a spiral galaxy, a member of the Virgo Cluster, that lies at a distance of about 70 million light-years. Although the spiral is tilted away from us, with only a thin sliver in view, such a perspective can be advantageous for astronomers. For instance, astronomers have previously used the high inclination of this spiral to study the properties of the halo of hot gas that is visible when the galaxy is observed at X-ray wavelengths. It is a member of the NGC 5775 Group of galaxies, itself one of the Virgo III Groups strung out to the east of the Virgo Supercluster of galaxies.

One supernova has been observed in NGC 5775: SN 1996ae (Type IIn, mag. 16.5) was discovered by A. Vagnozzi, G. Piermarini, and V. Russo on 21 May 1996.

== Interaction with NGC 5774 ==
NGC 5775 is interacting with the nearby galaxy NGC 5774 in the form of two connecting H I bridges through which the gas is travelling from NGC 5774 to NGC 5775. Faint optical emission as well as radio continuum emission are also present along the bridges. It is possible that star formation is occurring between the galaxies.

This system may be in the early stages of a merger.

== Gallery ==
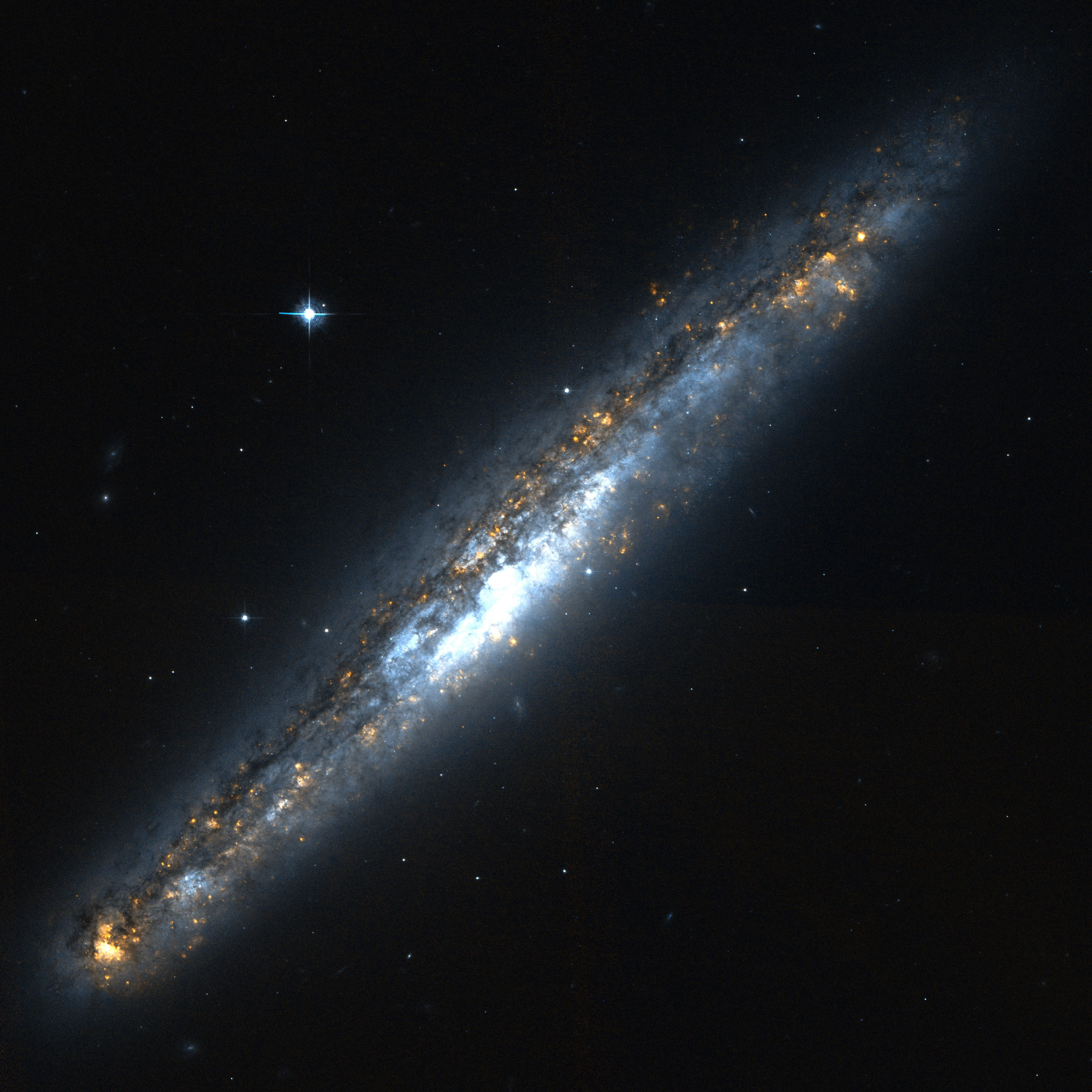
NGC 5775 by Hubble Space Telescope

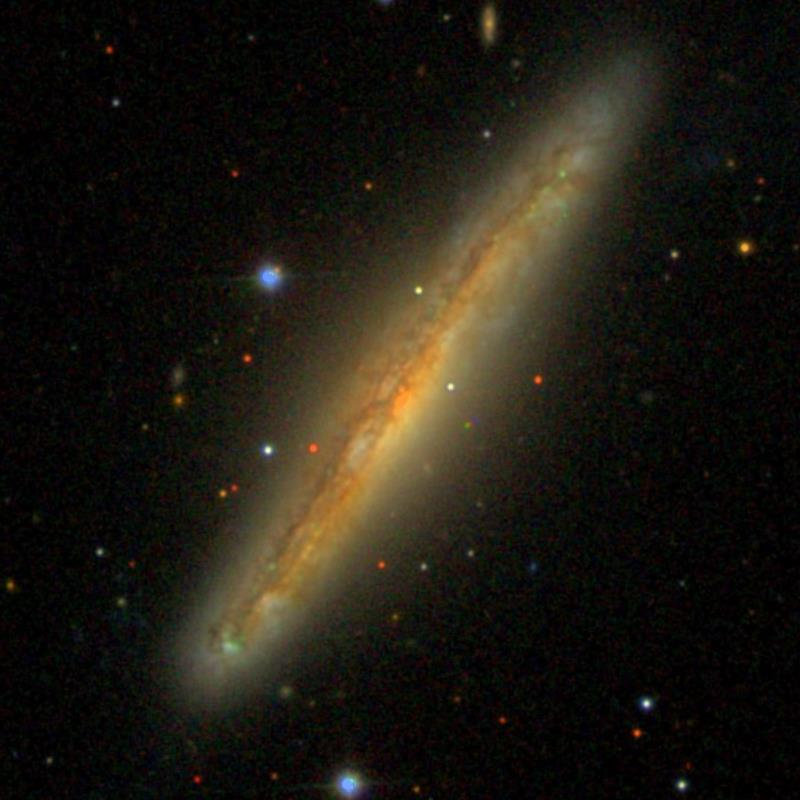
NGC 5775 (SDSS DR14)

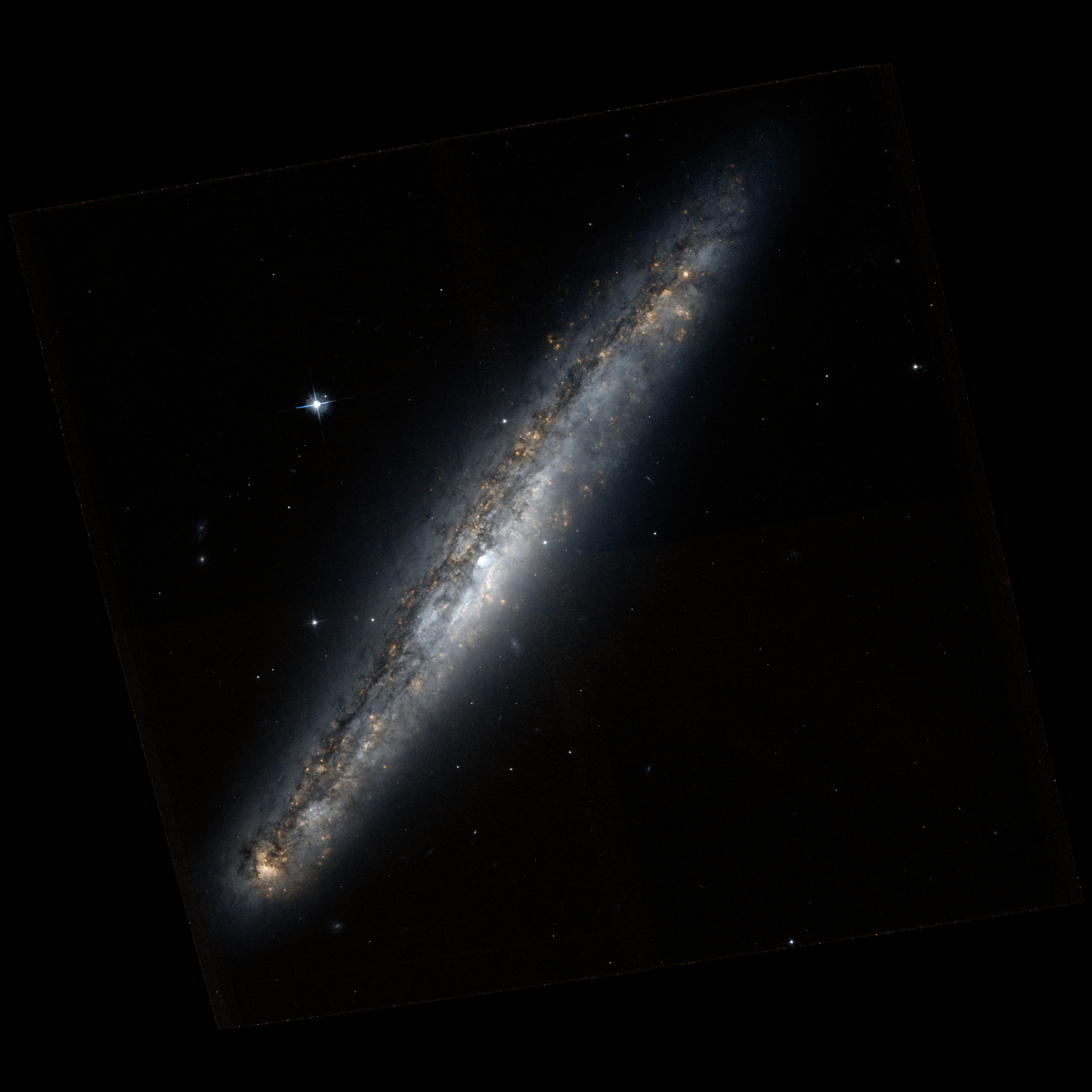
NGC 5775 (HST)
