= NGC 5705 =

Galaxy in the constellation Virgo

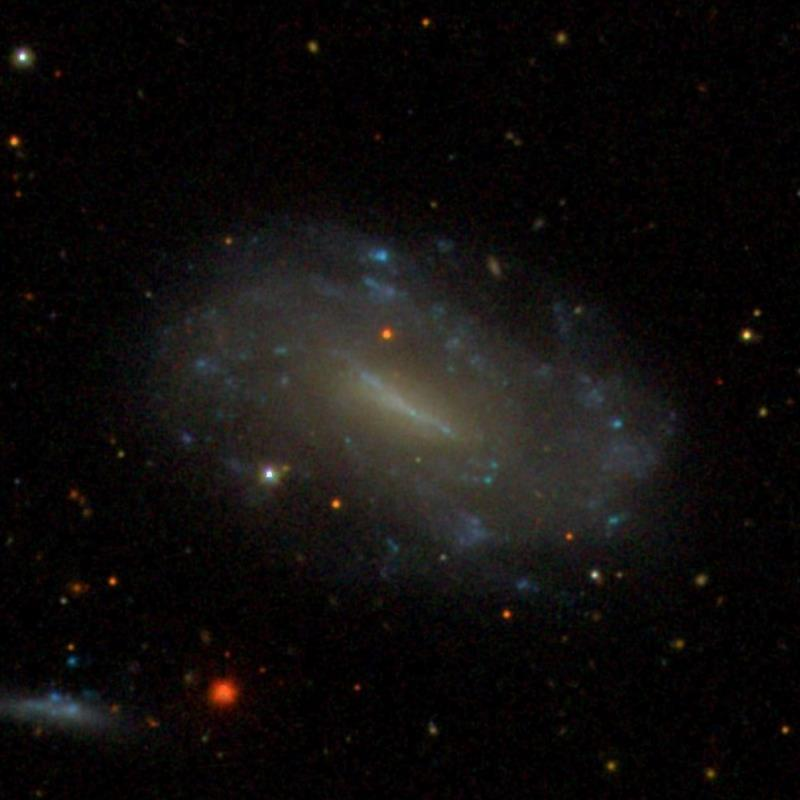
- SDSS image of NGC 5705

Observation data (J2000 epoch)
- Constellation: Virgo
- Right ascension: 14^{h} 39^{m} 49.7^{s}
- Declination: −0° 43′ 6″
- Redshift: 1758 ± 4 km/s
- Apparent magnitude (V): 13.3

Characteristics
- Type: SB(rs)d
- Apparent size (V): 2'.9 × 1'.7

Other designations
- UGC 9447, PGC 52395

NGC 5705 is a spiral galaxy in the constellation Virgo. It was discovered on 17 May 1884 by French astronomer Édouard Stephan.

NGC 5705 is part of a small group of spiral galaxies that also includes NGC 5691, NGC 5713, and NGC 5719. It is a member of the NGC 5746 Group of galaxies, itself one of the Virgo III Groups strung out to the east of the Virgo Supercluster of galaxies.

== See also ==
- List of NGC objects (5001–6000)
