= NGC 5665 =

Galaxy in the constellation Boötes

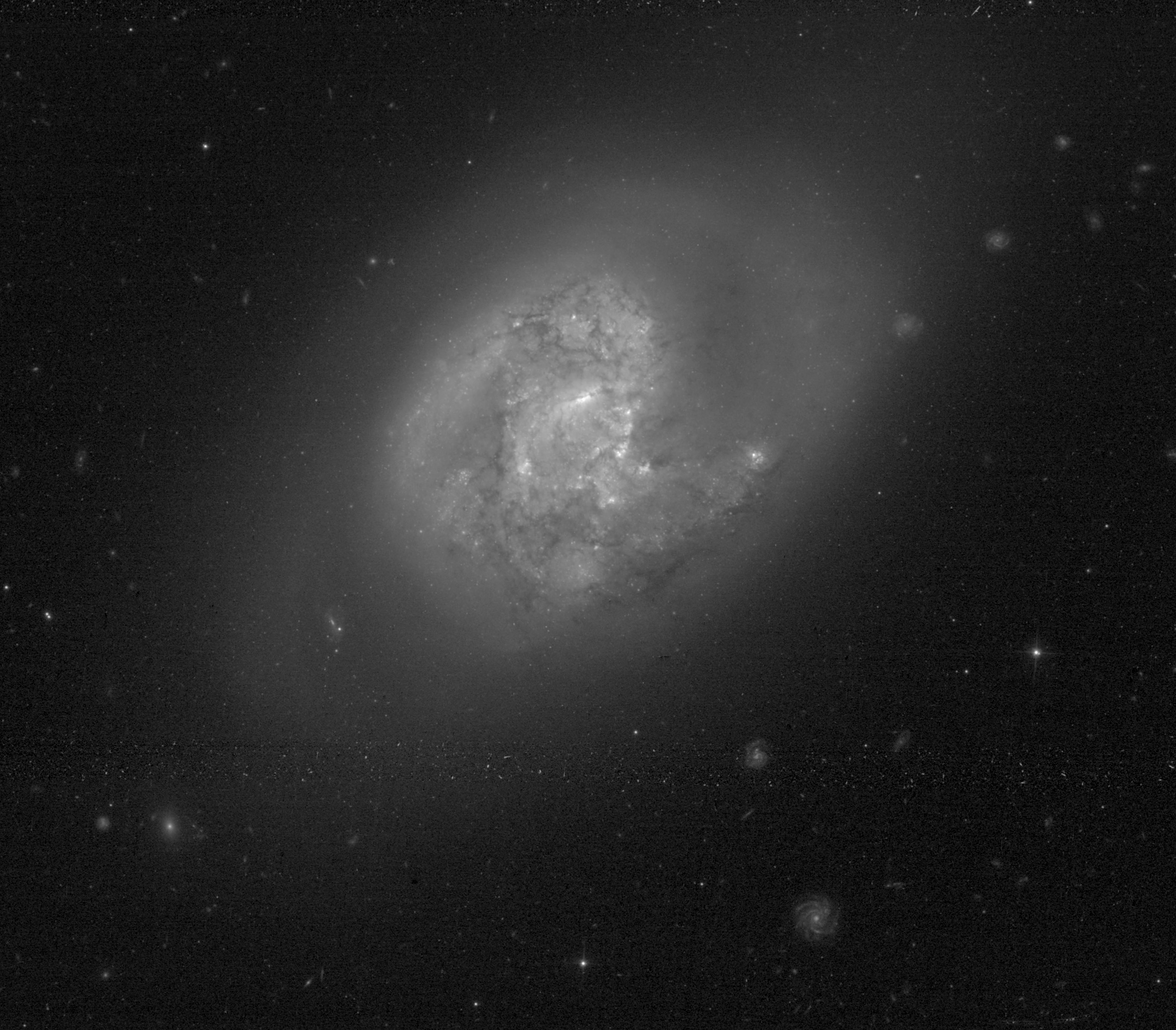
- Hubble Space Telescope view of NGC 5665

Observation data (J2000 epoch)
- Constellation: Boötes
- Right ascension: 14^{h} 32^{m} 25.796^{s}
- Declination: +08° 04′ 42.43″
- Redshift: 0.007431±0.000017
- Heliocentric radial velocity: 2,237 km/s
- Distance: 53.6 ± 7.7 Mly (16.44 ± 2.37 Mpc)
- Apparent magnitude (V): 12.7
- Apparent magnitude (B): 12.50

Characteristics
- Type: SAB(rs)c pec?
- Mass: 6×10^{10} M_{☉}
- Apparent size (V): 1.653′ × 1.257′

Other designations
- GC 3923, IRAS F14299+0818, 2MASX J14322579+0804424, NGC 5665, UGC 9352, LEDA 51953, MCG +01-37-024, PGC 51953, CGCG 047.084, VV 412

NGC 5665 is a spiral galaxy in the northern constellation of Boötes. It was discovered on January 30, 1784 by German-British astronomer William Herschel. This galaxy is located at a distance of 53.6 ± 7.7 million light-years (16.44 ± 2.37 Mpc), and is receding with a heliocentric radial velocity of 2,237 km/s. It is cataloged in Halton Arp's Atlas of Peculiar Galaxies as object number 49.

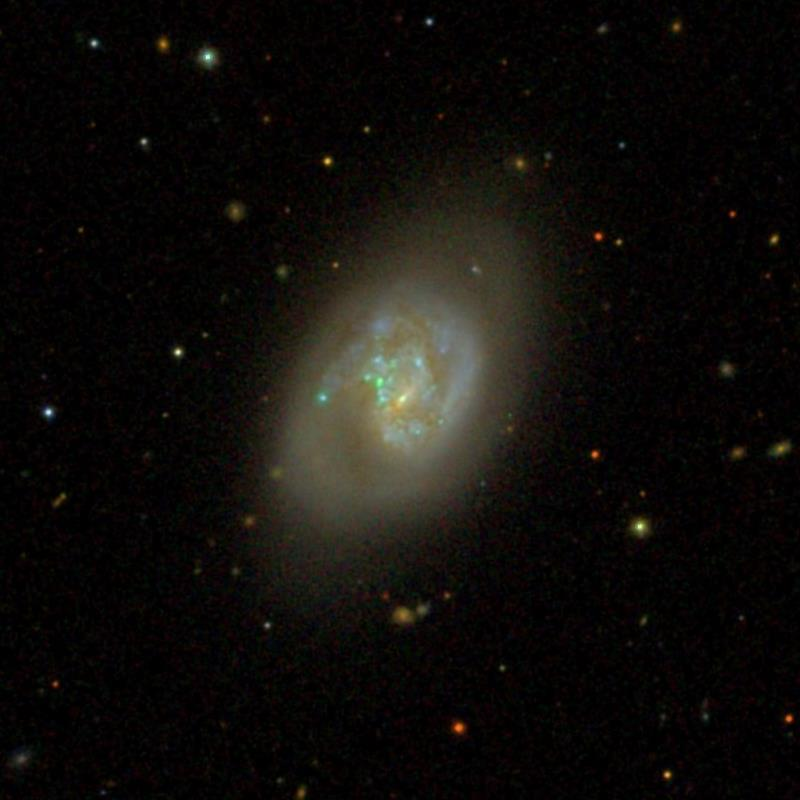
SDSS image of NGC 5665

The morphological classification of NGC 5665 is unclear and differs by author. In the De Vaucouleurs system it was classified as SAB(rs)c pec?, which indicates a weakly-barred spiral galaxy (SAB) with a transitional inner ring structure (rs), loosely wound spiral arms (c), and suspected peculiarities (pec?). The galactic plane is inclined at an angle of 53°±5° to the plane of the sky, with the major axis aligned along a position angle of 145°.

Evidence suggests that NGC 5665 underwent a gravitational interaction with another galaxy some 500 million years ago, swallowing a smaller companion. It is somewhat asymmetrical in appearance, retaining a single main spiral arm and the remains of several others. The galaxy is rich in dust and gas with a small bar at the center. There are numerous sites of star formation in the arm that match the age of the interaction. The spectrum of the core is a blend between a LINER and an H II region.

NGC 5665 is part of the Virgo-Libra Cloud, which is part of the Virgo Supercluster.
