= NGC 4618 =

Distorted dwarf barred spiral galaxy in the constellation Canes Venatici

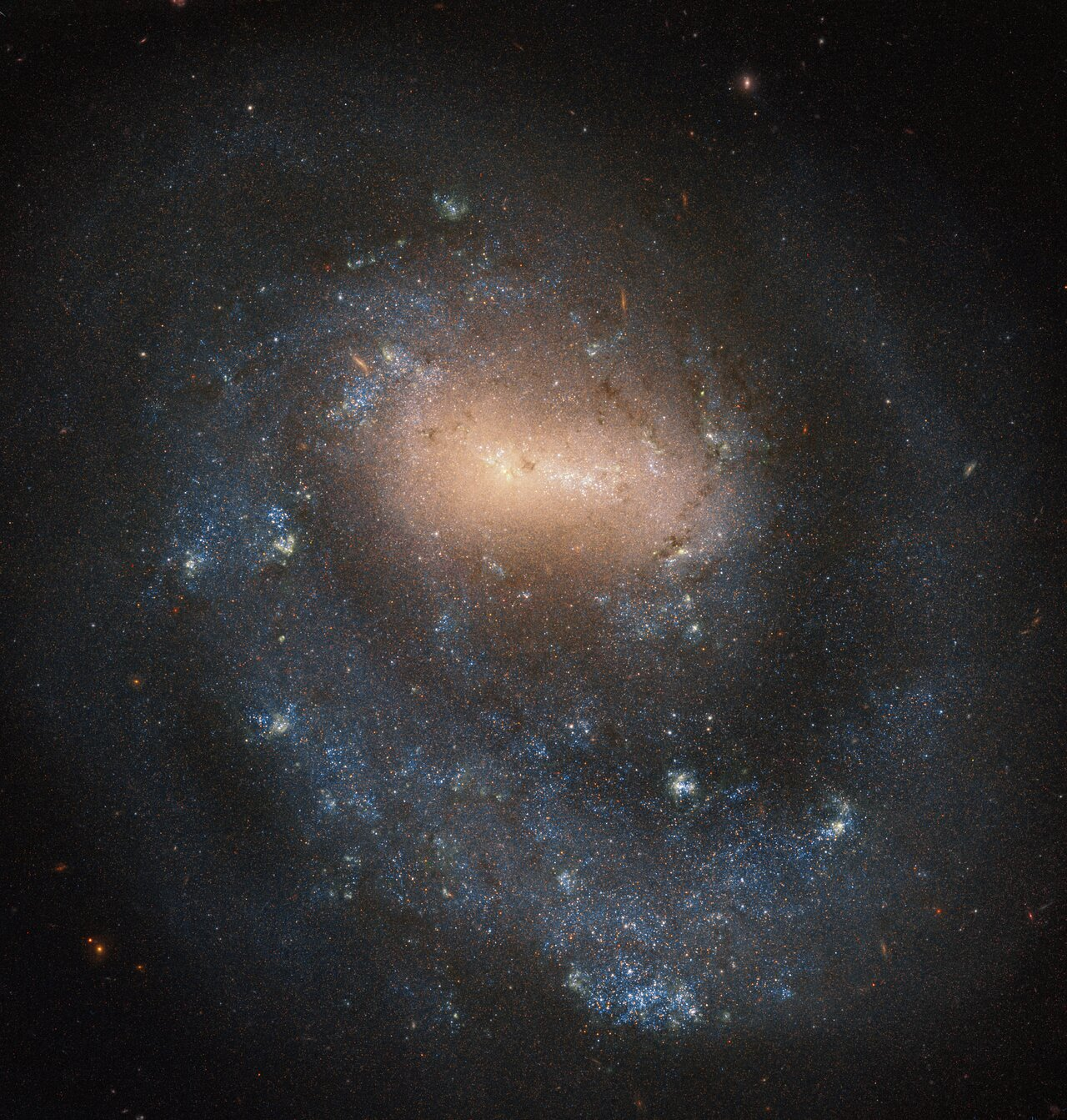
- Barred spiral galaxy NGC 4618 imaged by the Hubble Space Telescope

Observation data (J2000 epoch)
- Constellation: Canes Venatici
- Right ascension: 12^{h} 41^{m} 32.8^{s}
- Declination: +41° 09′ 03″
- Redshift: 544±1 km/s
- Apparent magnitude (V): 10.6

Characteristics
- Type: SB(rs)m
- Apparent size (V): 4.2′ × 3.4′
- Notable features: asymmetric; single spiral arm

Other designations
- NGC 4618, IC 3667, Arp 23, UGC 7853, PGC 042575, VV 73

NGC 4618 is a distorted barred dwarf galaxy in the constellation Canes Venatici. It is formally classified as a Sm galaxy, which means that its structure vaguely resembles the structure of spiral galaxies. The galaxy is sometimes referred to as a Magellanic spiral because of its resemblance to the Magellanic clouds.

== Observations ==
Unlike most spiral galaxies, NGC 4618 has a single spiral arm, which gives the galaxy an asymmetric appearance. This galaxy was included in the Atlas of Peculiar Galaxies as one of three examples of nearby galaxies with single spiral arms. Although NGC 4618 is labeled as peculiar, many similar galaxies have been identified.

It has been hypothesized that this galaxy's asymmetric structure may be the result of a gravitational interaction with NGC 4625. Such asymmetric structure is commonly seen among many interacting galaxies. However, observations of neutral hydrogen gas in NGC 4618 and NGC 4625 imply that only some of the gas outside the optical disks of NGC 4618 is affected by the gravitational interaction. This may indicate that NGC 4618's one-arm shape forms as the result of processes that are intrinsic to the galaxy itself.

One supernova has been observed in NGC 4618: SN 1985F (Type Ib, mag. 16) was discovered by Alex Filippenko and Wallace L. W. Sargent on 28 February 1985.

== See also ==
- Canes II Group
- NGC 5713 – a similar asymmetric spiral galaxy
