= NGC 4625 =

Distorted dwarf spiral galaxy in the constellation Canes Venatici

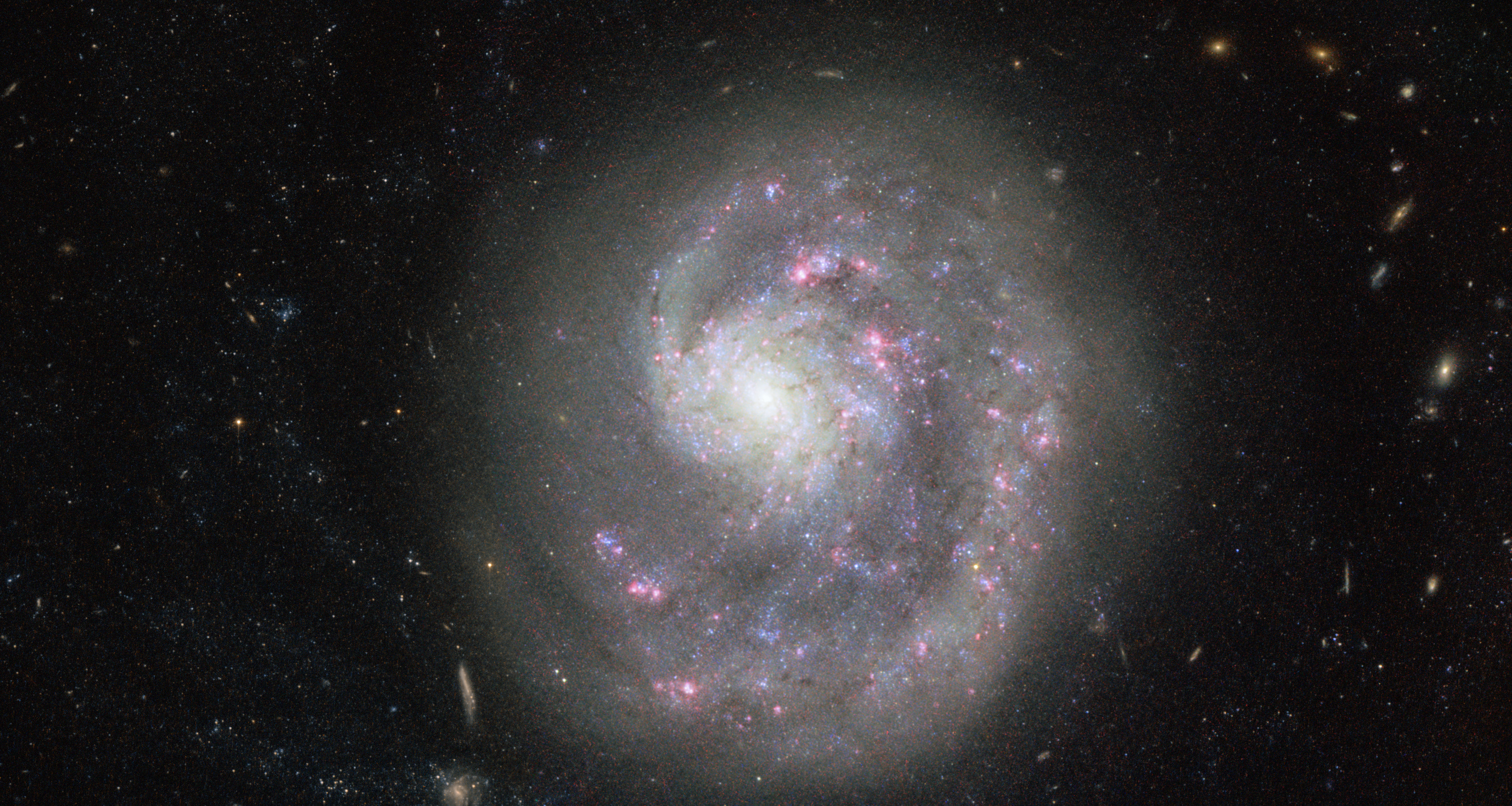
- Hubble Space Telescope image of NGC 4625

Observation data (J2000 epoch)
- Constellation: Canes Venatici
- Right ascension: 12^{h} 41^{m} 52.7^{s}
- Declination: +41° 16′ 26″
- Redshift: 609 ± 1 km/s
- Apparent magnitude (V): 13.2g

Characteristics
- Type: SAB(rs)m pec
- Apparent size (V): 1.3′ × 1.2′
- Notable features: Asymmetric; Single spiral arm

Other designations
- IC 3675, UGC 7861, PGC 42607

NGC 4625 is a distorted dwarf galaxy in the constellation Canes Venatici. The galaxy is formally classified as a Sm galaxy, which means that its structure vaguely resembles the structure of spiral galaxies. The galaxy is sometimes referred to as a Magellanic spiral because of its resemblance to the Large Magellanic Cloud's single-arm structure.

== Structure ==
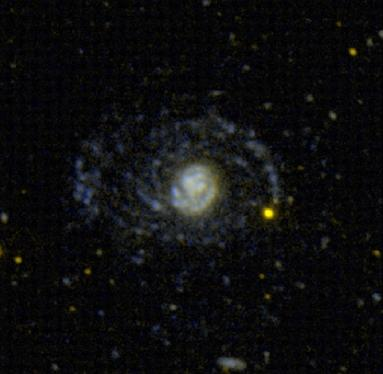
An ultraviolet image of NGC 4625 taken with GALEX shows a disc four times larger than what is seen in visible light

Unlike most spiral galaxies, NGC 4625 has a single spiral arm, which gives the galaxy an asymmetric appearance. It has been hypothesized that this galaxy's asymmetric structure may be the result of a gravitational interaction with NGC 4618. Such asymmetric structure is commonly seen among many interacting galaxies. However, observations of neutral hydrogen gas in NGC 4618 and NGC 4625 show that NGC 4625 does not appear to have been affected by the gravitational interaction. This indicates that the single-arm structure seen in NGC 4625 may be created through intrinsic processes.

Ultraviolet observations of NGC 4625 made by the Galaxy Evolution Explorer (GALEX) show the presence of an extended disk. The new spiral disk extrends 28,000 light-years from the galaxy center, a staggering four times the optical radius. The hot blue stars in this new disk may have formed from the inflow of fresh gas and dust from interaction with its companions, NGC 4618 and NGC 4625A. The UV-to-optical colors suggest that the bulk of the stars in the disk of NGC 4625 are currently being formed, providing a unique opportunity to study today the physics of star formation under conditions similar to those when the normal disks of spiral galaxies like the Milky Way first formed.

== Environment ==
As mentioned above, NGC 4625 is interacting with NGC 4618.

== See also ==
- NGC 5713 - a similar asymmetric spiral galaxy
