= NGC 5566 =

Galaxy in the constellation Virgo

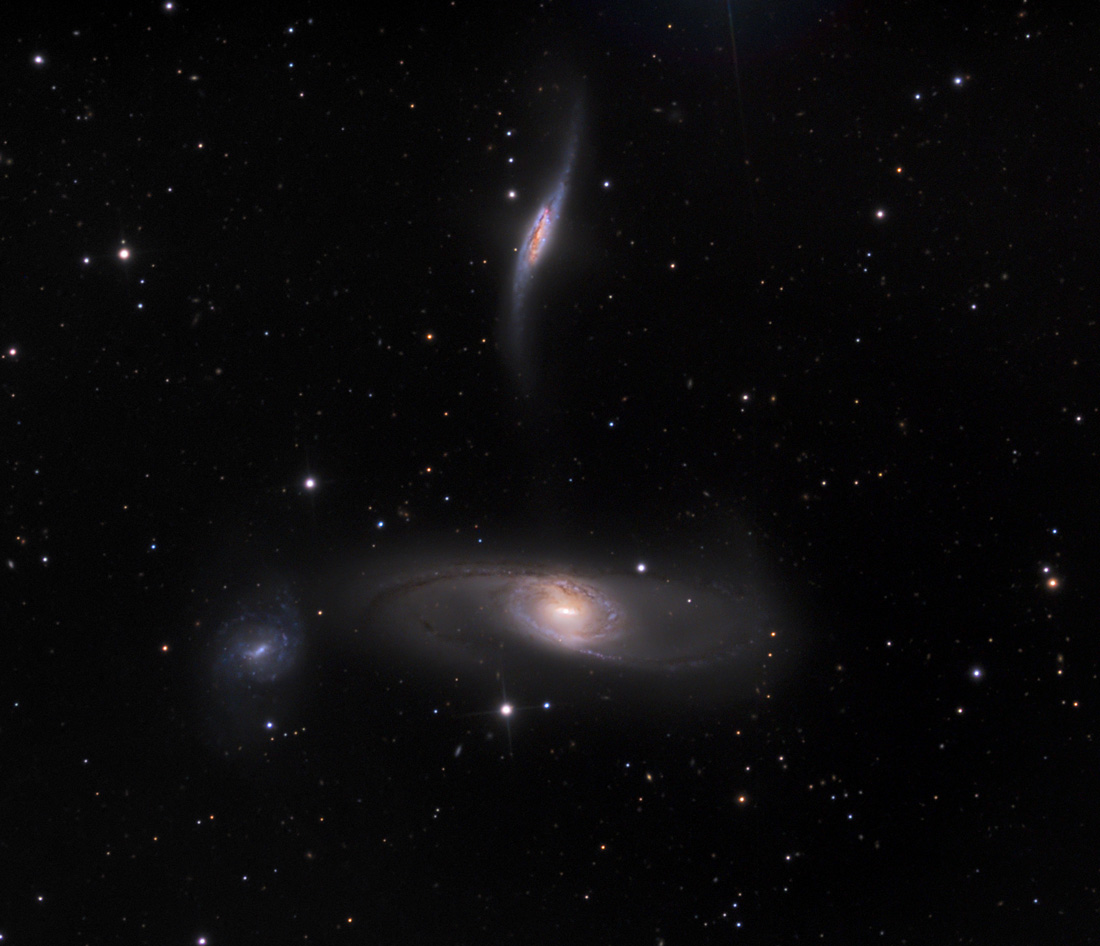
- Galaxies in the constellation Virgo featuring NCG5566, taken by the HST; 4.2′x2. 52′ view

Observation data (J2000 epoch)
- Constellation: Virgo
- Right ascension: 14^{h} 20^{m} 19.95^{s}
- Declination: +03° 56′ 00.9″
- Redshift: 0.004240
- Heliocentric radial velocity: 1271 ± 14 km/s
- Distance: 66 Mly (20.1 Mpc)
- Apparent magnitude (V): 11.1

Characteristics
- Type: SBab
- Apparent size (V): 4.4′ × 1.5′

Other designations
- Arp 286, UGC 9175, PGC 30083

NGC 5566 is a barred spiral galaxy in the constellation Virgo, which is approximately 66 million light years away from Earth. The galaxy is the biggest in the constellation Virgo, stretching nearly 150,000 light years in diameter. The galaxy NGC 5566 was discovered on 30 April 1786 by the German-British astronomer William Herschel. It is included in Halton Arp's Atlas of Peculiar Galaxies. It is a member of the NGC 5566 Group of galaxies, itself one of the Virgo III Groups strung out to the east of the Virgo Supercluster of galaxies.

== Gallery ==
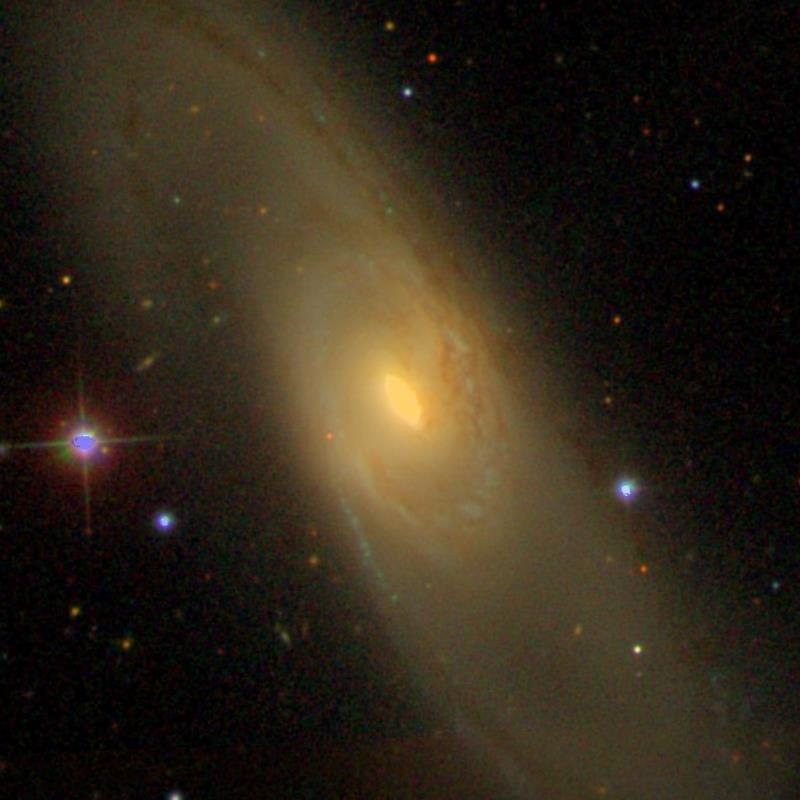
NGC 5566 (SDSS DR14)

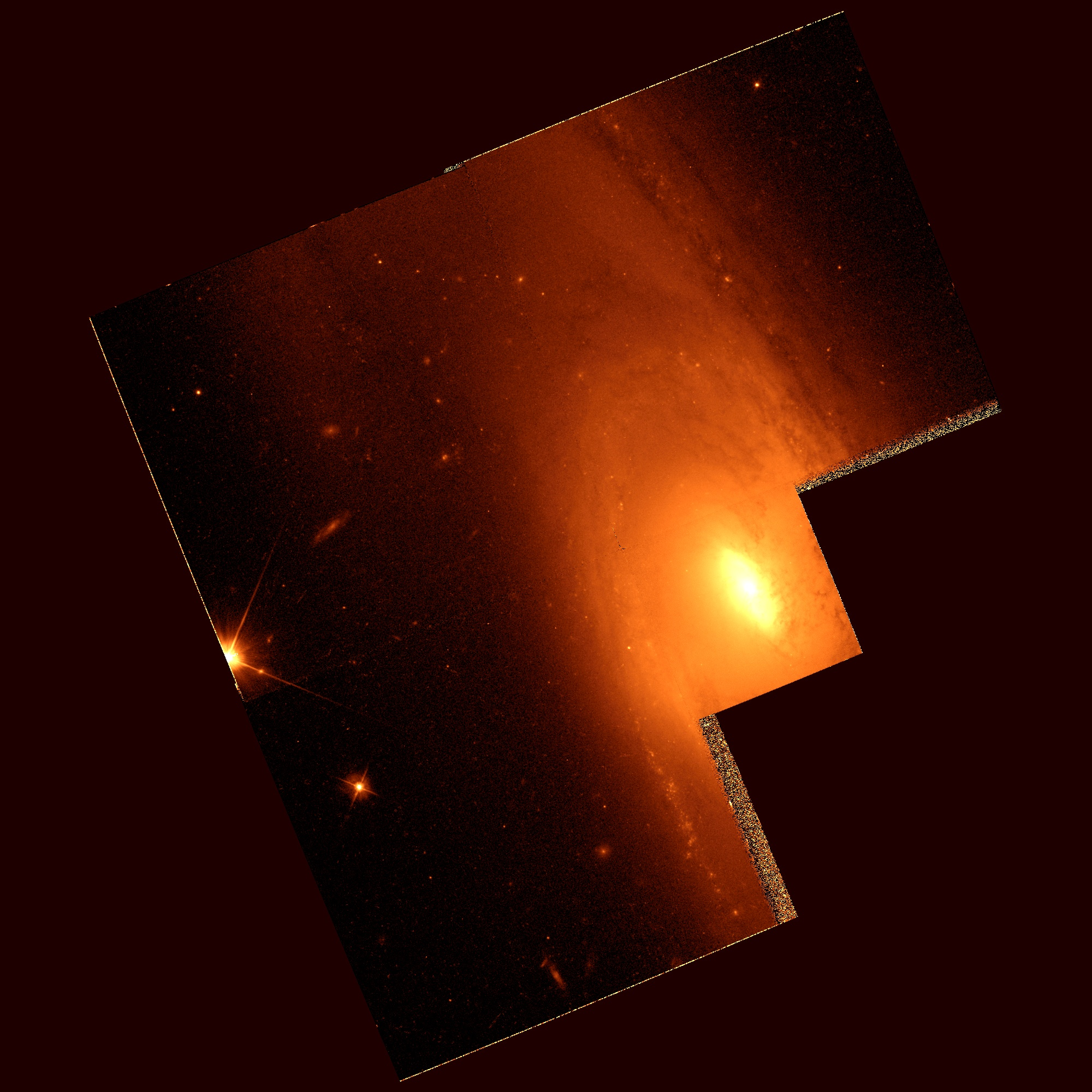
NGC 5566 (HST)

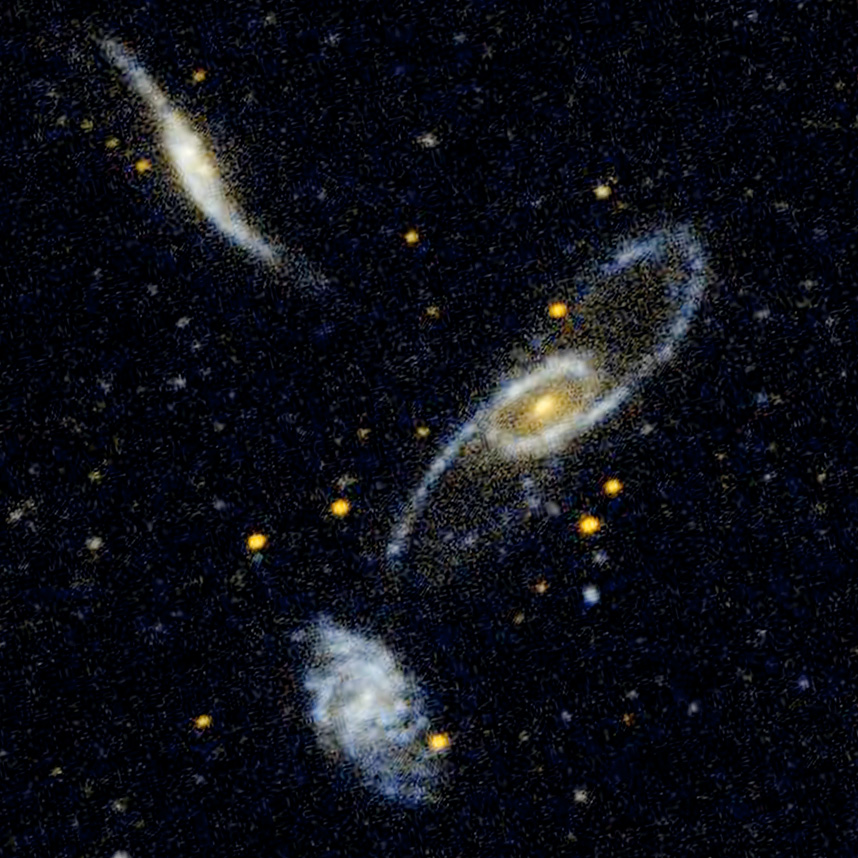
NGC 5560 (top galaxy) and NGC 5566 (middle galaxy) and NGC 5569 (bottom galaxy) from GALEX
