= NGC 5668 =

Galaxy in the constellation Virgo

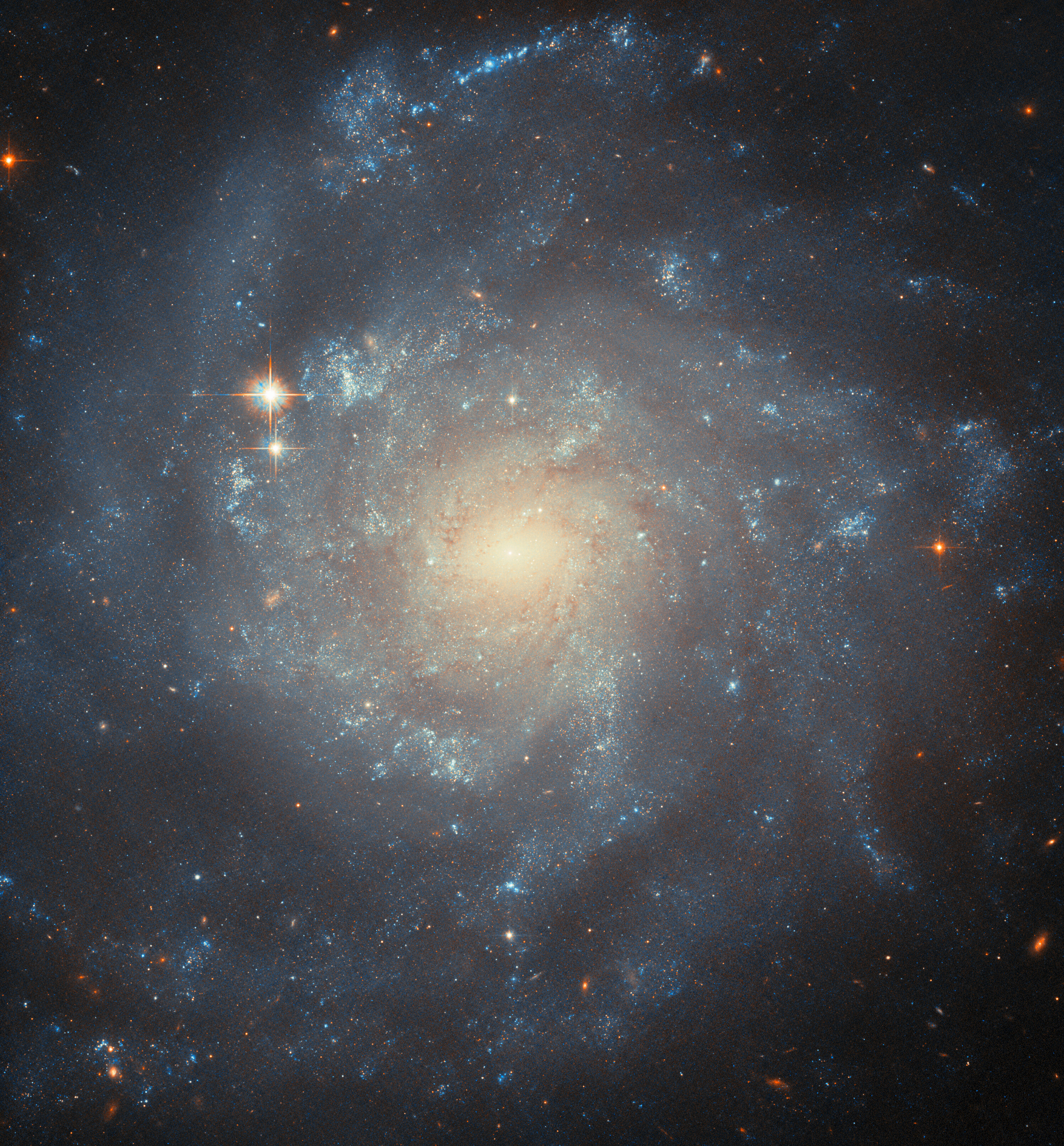
- NGC 5668 imaged by the Hubble Space Telescope

Observation data (J2000 epoch)
- Constellation: Virgo
- Right ascension: 14^{h} 33^{m} 24.331^{s}
- Declination: +04° 27′ 01.75″
- Redshift: 0.005280
- Heliocentric radial velocity: 1,582 ± 5 km/s
- Distance: 80.9 ± 5.5 million light years (24.8 ± 1.7 Mpc)
- Group or cluster: NGC 5638 Group, NGC 5746 Group, Virgo III Groups

Characteristics
- Type: SA(s)d
- Mass: 5.7×10^{10} M_{☉}
- Size: ~48,400 ly (14.84 kpc) (estimated)
- Apparent size (V): 3.0′ × 3.0′

Other designations
- IRAS 14309+0440, UGC 9363, MCG +01-37-028, PGC 52018, CGCG 047-090

NGC 5668 is a nearly face-on spiral galaxy, visual magnitude about 11.5, located about 81 million light years away in the constellation Virgo. It was discovered on 29 April 1786 by William Herschel.

NGC 5668 is a member of the NGC 5638 Group of galaxies, itself one of the Virgo III Groups strung out to the east of the Virgo Supercluster of galaxies. In addition, A.M. Garcia listed NGC 5668 in the 31 member NGC 5746 galaxy group (also known as LGG 386).

As seen from the Earth, it is inclined by an angle of 18° to the line of sight along a position angle of 145°. The morphological classification in the De Vaucouleurs system is SA(s)d, indicating a pure spiral structure with loosely wound arms. However, optical images of the galaxy indicate the presence of a weak bar structure spanning an angle of 12″ across the nucleus. There is a dwarf galaxy located around 650×10^{3} ly (200 kpc) to the southeast of NGC 5668, and the two may be gravitationally interacting.

== Supernovae ==
Three supernovae have been observed in this galaxy:

- SN 1952G (type unknown, mag. 17.9) was discovered by Fritz Zwicky on 18 April 1952.
- SN 1954B (Type Ia, mag. 12.3) was discovered by Paul Wild on 4 May 1954. (Note: Some sources incorrectly list the discovery date as 27 April 1954.)
- SN 2004G (Type II, mag. 17.2) was discovered by Reiki Kushida on 19 January 2004. It was initially imaged at 43" to the west and 12".5 south of the galaxy core.

High-velocity clouds of neutral hydrogen have been observed in NGC 5668, which may have their origin in supernova explosions and strong stellar winds.

== Gallery ==
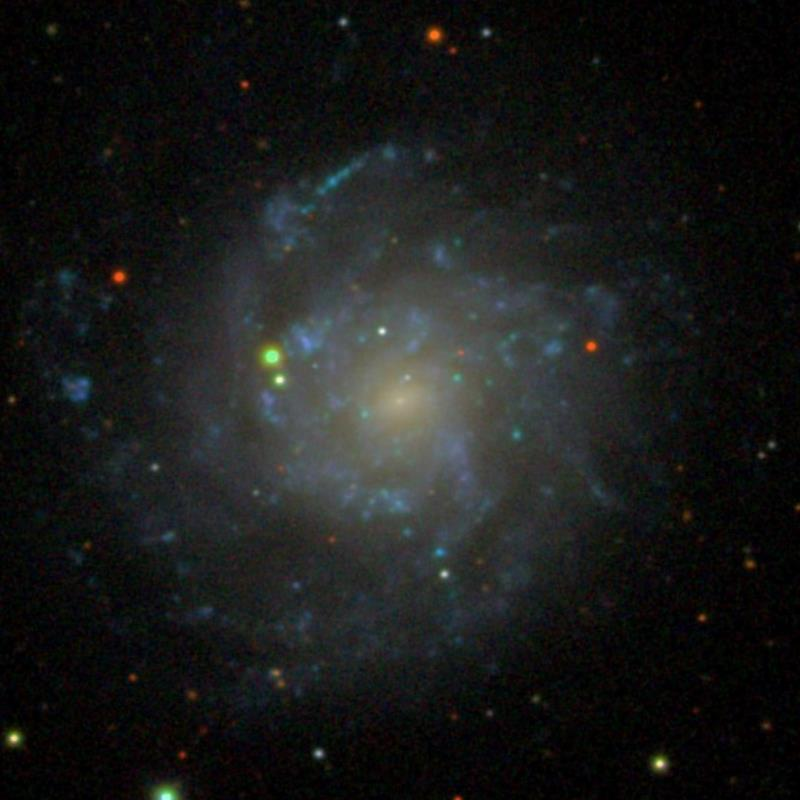
NGC 5668 (SDSS DR14)

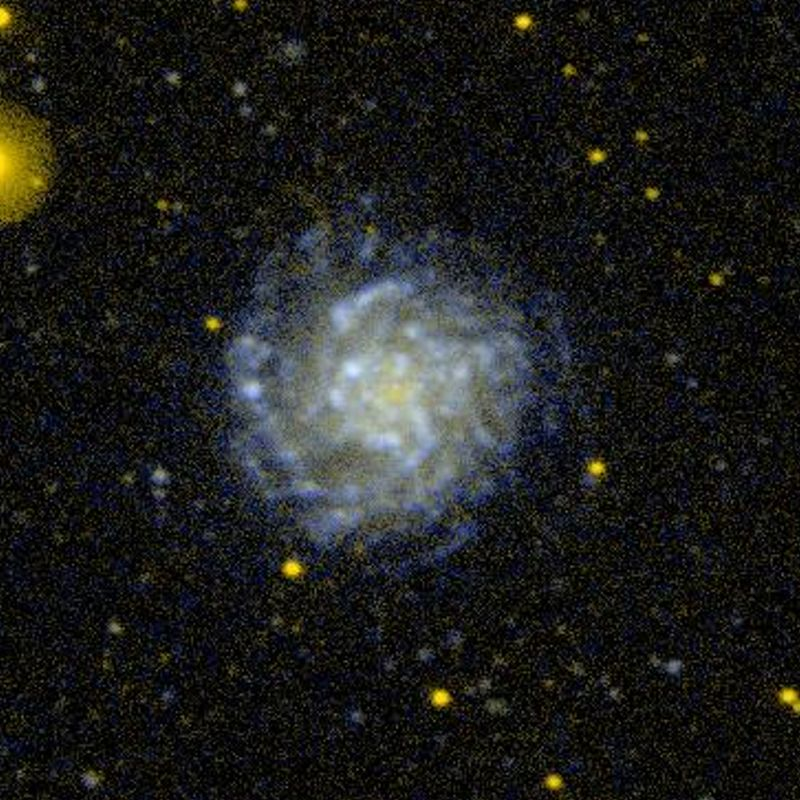
GALEX image of NGC 5668

== See also ==
- List of NGC objects (5001–6000)
