= NGC 5713 =

Peculiar and asymmetric galaxy in the constellation Virgo

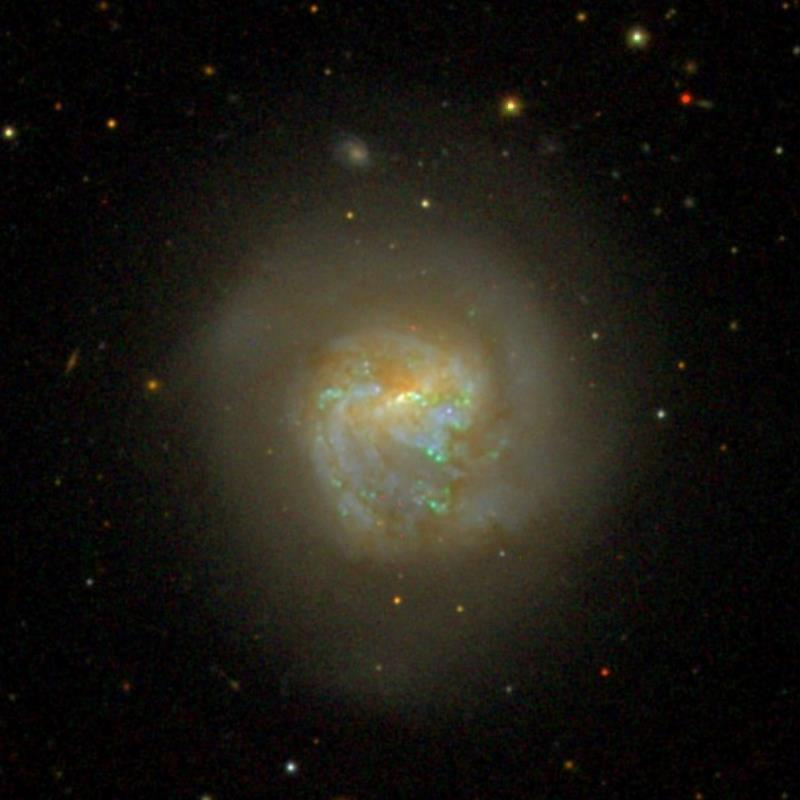

Observation data (J2000 epoch)
- Constellation: Virgo
- Right ascension: 14^{h} 40^{m} 11.5^{s}
- Declination: −00° 17′ 21″
- Redshift: 1899 ± 7 km/s
- Distance: 88.6 Mly (27.16 Mpc)
- Apparent magnitude (V): 12.1

Characteristics
- Type: SAB(rs)bc pec
- Apparent size (V): 2'.8 × 2'.5
- Notable features: single spiral arm

Other designations
- UGC 9451, PGC 52412, VIII Zw 447

NGC 5713 is a peculiar, asymmetric galaxy in the constellation Virgo, about 90 million light-years away. Although classified as a spiral galaxy by most galaxy catalogs, NGC 5713 is very different from most normal spiral galaxies. While most spiral galaxies either have either two well-defined spiral arms or a filamentary spiral-like structure, this spiral galaxy has only one visible spiral arm in its disk. This makes it a galaxy of the Magellanic type. Gravitational interactions with the nearby spiral galaxy NGC 5719 may be responsible for producing the disturbed, asymmetric structure including the single spiral arm.

NGC 5713 is at the center of a small group of spiral galaxies that also includes NGC 5691, NGC 5705, and NGC 5719. The satellite galaxies around both NGC 5713 and NGC 5719 have somewhat different velocities, and as the two galaxies interact it appears that their respective satellite systems are merging. It is a member of the NGC 5746 Group of galaxies, itself one of the Virgo III Groups strung out to the east of the Virgo Supercluster of galaxies.

== Star formation ==
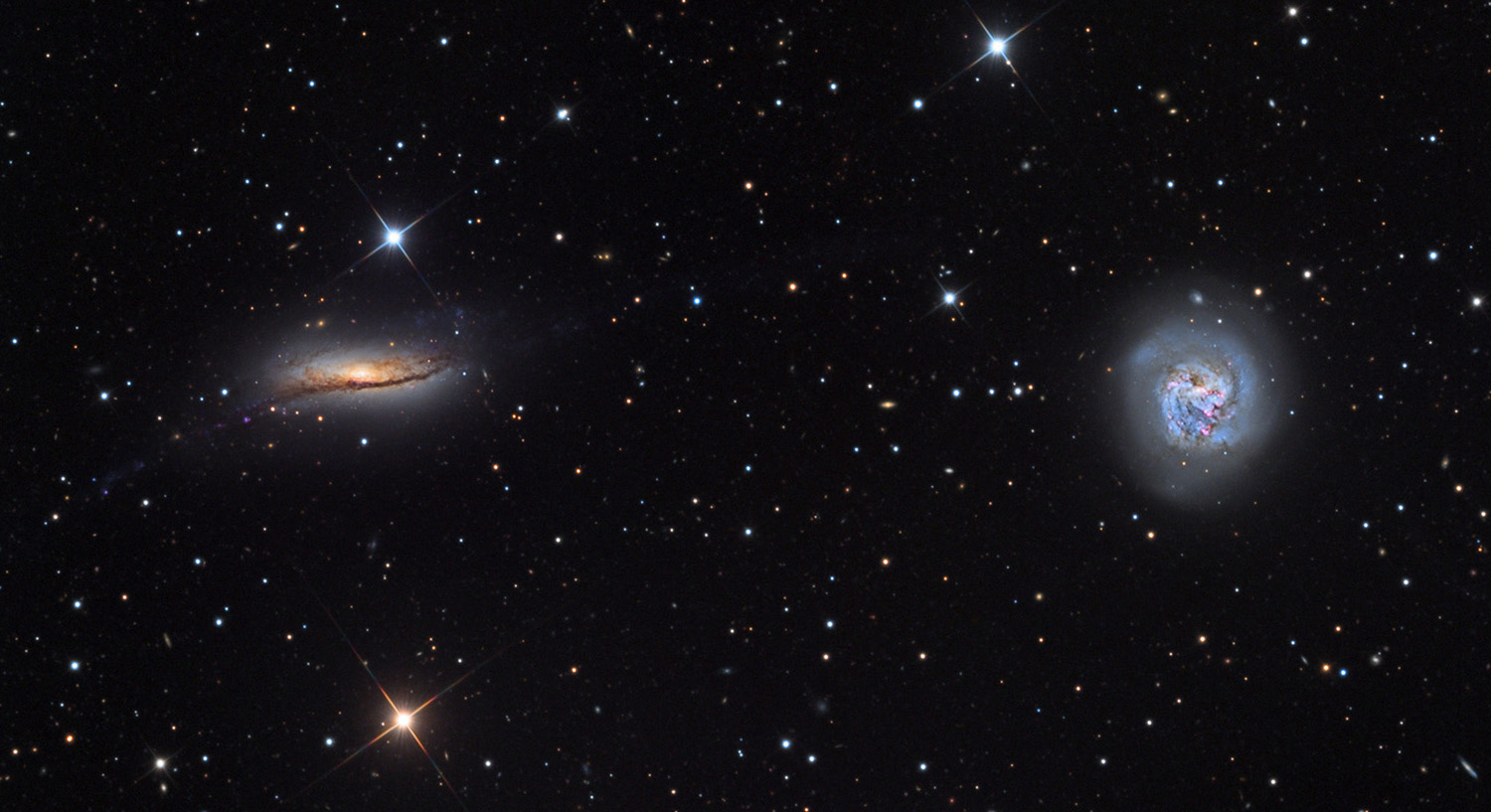
NGC 5713 (right), interacting with NGC 5719 (left)

Compared to many other nearby spiral galaxies, NGC 5713 appears to be a site of relatively intense star formation activity. The boost in star formation in NGC 5713 may be linked to the gravitational interactions with NGC 5719. The interactions are expected to disturb the orbits of gas clouds in NGC 5713, thus causing the clouds to collide with each other. The collisions cause the clouds to collapse and form new stars, hence leading to the increased star formation seen in NGC 5713.

== See also ==
- NGC 4618, an interacting galaxy with a similar morphology
- NGC 4625, an interacting galaxy with a similar morphology
