= NGC 5468 =

Galaxy in the constellation Virgo

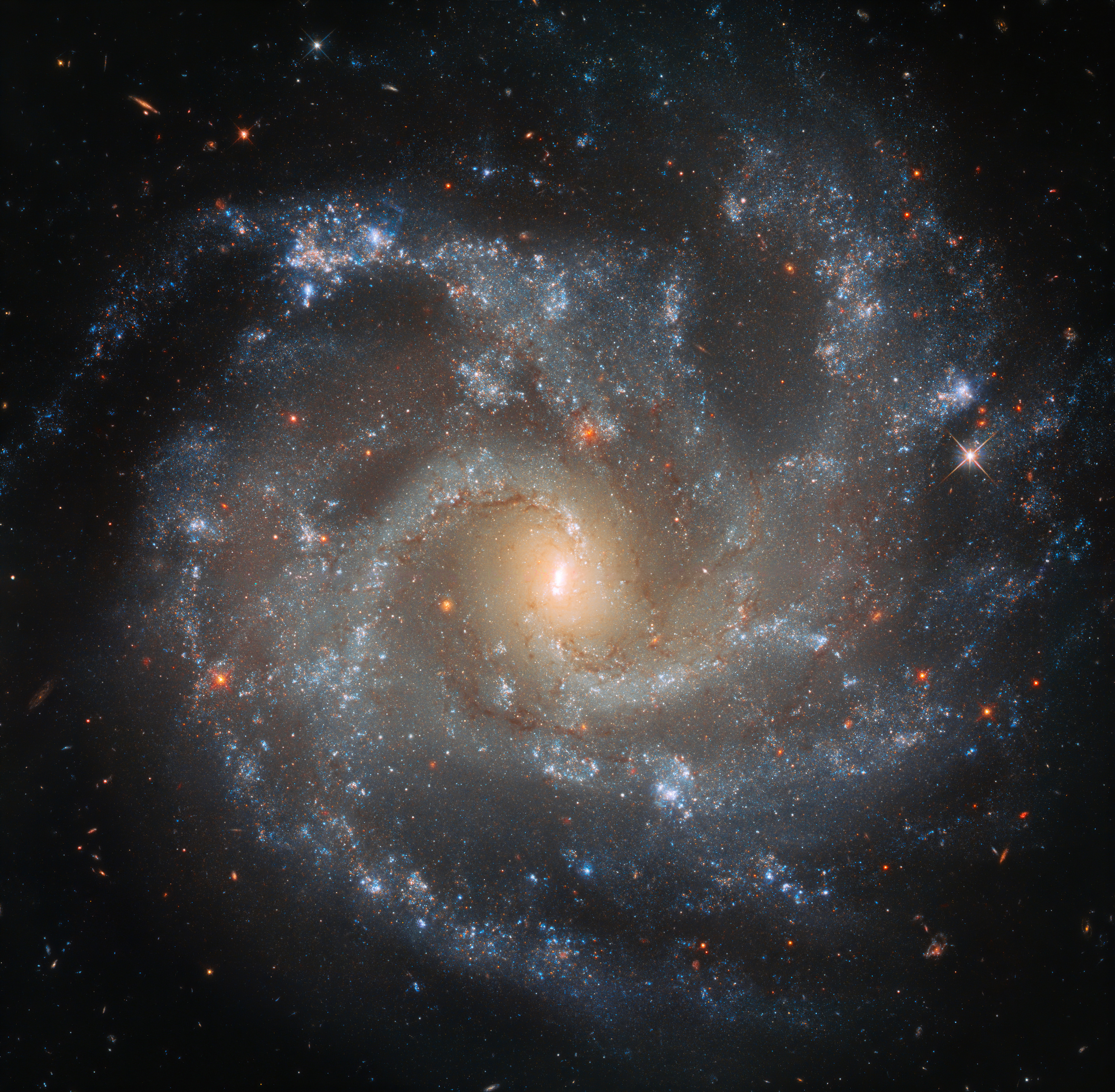
- NGC 5468 imaged by the Hubble Space Telescope

Observation data (J2000 epoch)
- Constellation: Virgo
- Right ascension: 14^{h} 06^{m} 34.9186^{s}
- Declination: −05° 27′ 11.057″
- Redshift: 0.009480 ± 0.000013
- Heliocentric radial velocity: 2,842 ± 4 km/s
- Distance: 138 ± 22.7 Mly (42.5 ± 7.0 Mpc)
- Apparent magnitude (V): 12.5

Characteristics
- Type: SAB(rs)cd
- Size: ~108,700 ly (33.32 kpc) (estimated)
- Apparent size (V): 2.6′ × 2.4′

Other designations
- HOLM 585A, IRAS 14039-0512, UGCA 384, MCG -01-36-007, PGC 50323

NGC 5468 is an intermediate spiral galaxy located in the constellation Virgo. It is located at a distance of about 140 million light-years from Earth, which, given its apparent dimensions, means that NGC 5468 is about 110,000 light-years across. It was discovered by William Herschel on 5 March 1785.

NGC 5468 is seen face-on, and the spiral pattern is open. The two principal arms emanate from a small bar and start to branch into several thin fragments after some distance. Three large H II regions and some fainter ones can be seen in the images of the Carnegie Atlas of Galaxies. These regions feature intense star formation. SN 2005P was located at the edge of one of these regions. As of 2024, NGC 5468 is the most distant galaxy in which Hubble Space Telescope has detected Cepheid variable stars, which are important milepost markers for measuring distances.

NGC 5468 forms a non-interacting pair with NGC 5472, which lies at a projected distance of 5.1 arcminutes. NGC 5468 belongs to the NGC 5493 galaxy group. Other members of the group are the interacting pair Arp 271 (NGC 5426 and NGC 5427), NGC 5476, and NGC 5493.

== Supernovae ==
Six supernovae have been observed in NGC 5468:

- SN 1999cp (Type Ia, mag. 18.2) was discovered by the Lick Observatory Supernova Search (LOSS) on 18 June 1999.
- SN 2002cr (Type Ia, mag. 16.5) was discovered by Reiki Kushida on 1 May 2002.
- SN 2002ed (Type IIP, mag. 16.5) was discovered by Berto Monard (bio-fr) on 24 July 2002. This supernova and SN 2002cr were visible in the galaxy at the same time.
- SN 2005P (Type Ia-pec, mag. 18.1) was discovered by the Lick Observatory Supernova Search (LOSS) on 21 January 2005.
- SN 2018dfg (Type IIb, mag. 17.8) was discovered by the Backyard Observatory Supernova Search (BOSS) on 10 July 2018.
- SN 2023cj (Type Ic, mag. 16.97) was discovered by Gaia Photometric Science Alerts on 5 January 2023.

== Gallery ==
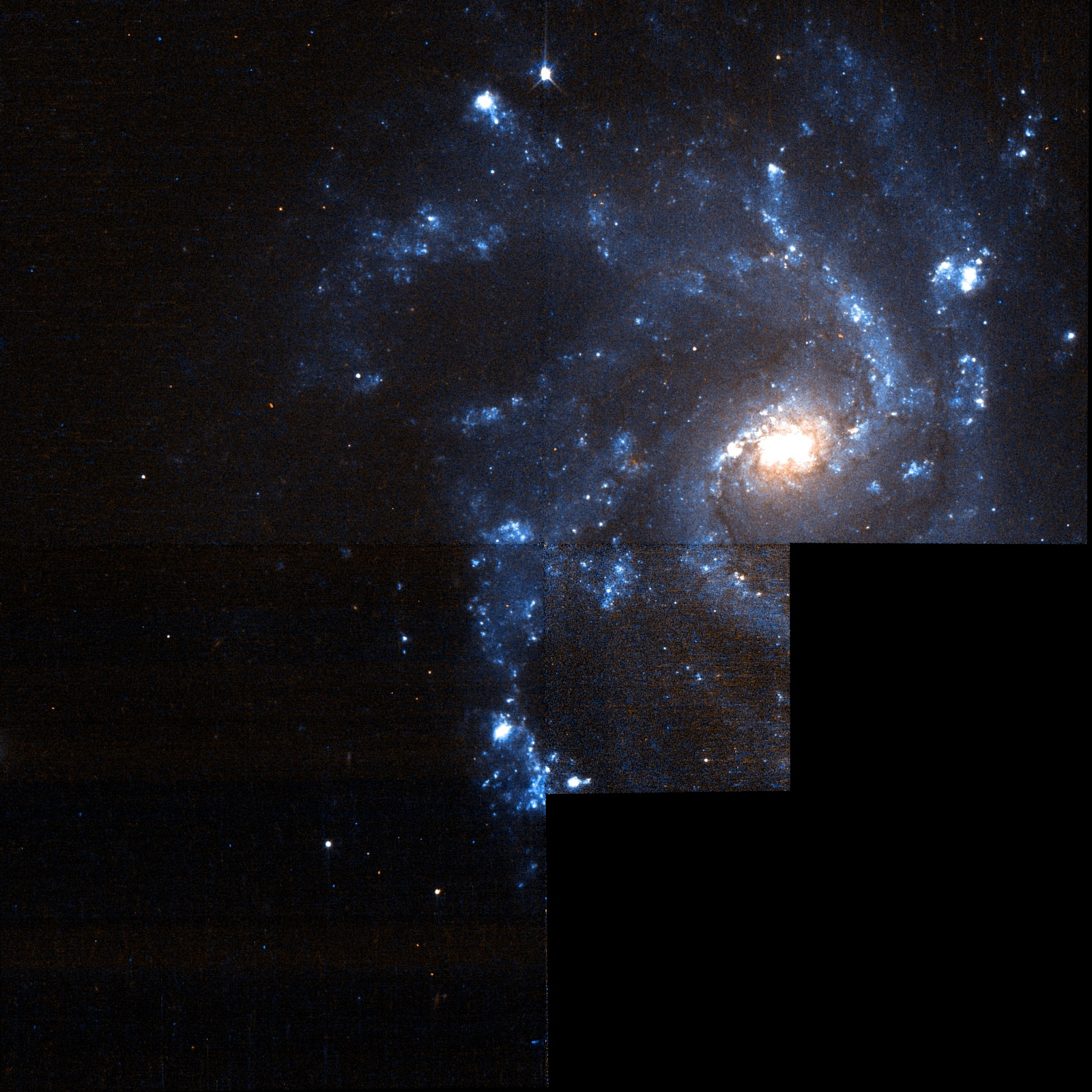
NGC 5468 by the HST

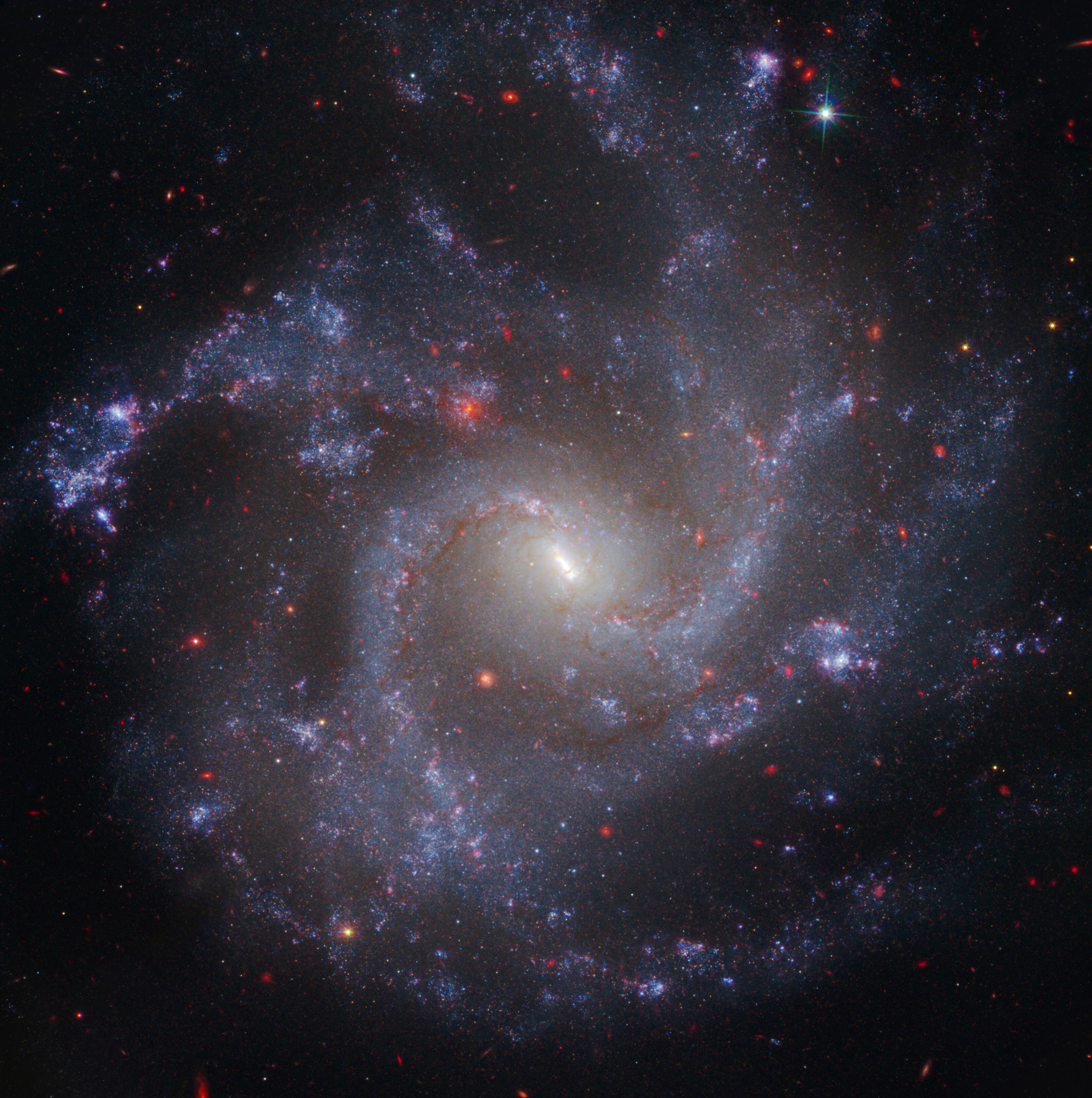
Image of NGC 5468 combining data from HST and James Webb Space Telescope
