= NGC 5701 =

Galaxy in the constellation of Virgo

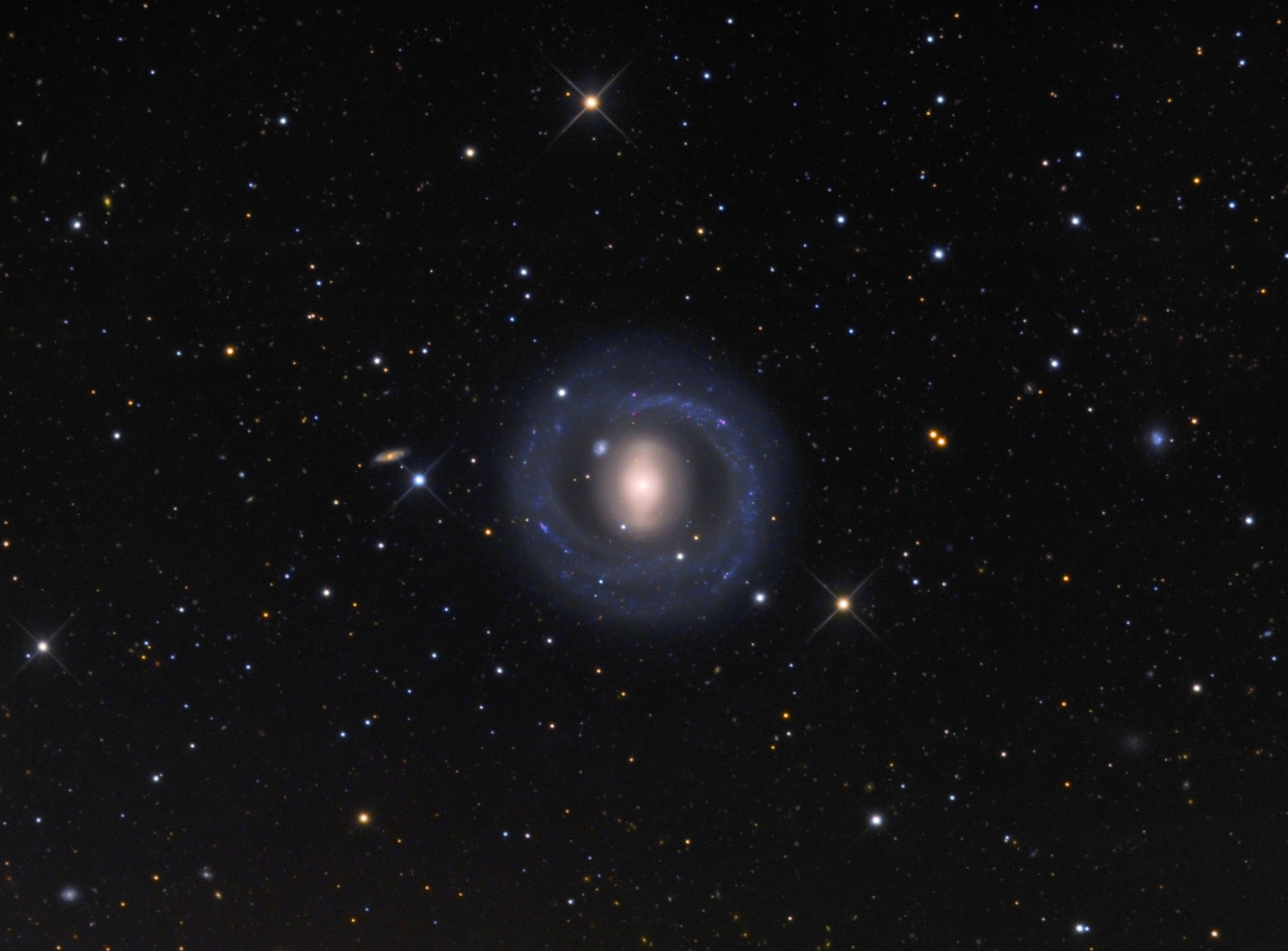
- NGC 5701 by the Mount Lemmon Observatory

Observation data (J2000 epoch)
- Constellation: Virgo
- Right ascension: 14^{h} 39^{m} 11.0737^{s}
- Declination: +05° 21′ 48.722″
- Redshift: 0.005020 ± 0.000002
- Heliocentric radial velocity: 1,505 ± 1 km/s
- Distance: 50 ± 17 Mly (15.4 ± 5.1 Mpc)
- Group or cluster: Virgo III Groups
- Apparent magnitude (V): 10.9

Characteristics
- Type: (R)SB(rs)0/a
- Size: ~66,000 ly (20.1 kpc) (estimated)
- Apparent size (V): 4.3′ × 4.1′

Other designations
- UGC 9436, CGCG 047-127, MCG +01-37-042, PGC 52365

NGC 5701 is a barred lenticular galaxy with a ring located in the constellation Virgo. It lies at a distance of about 50 million light years from Earth based on redshift-independent methods, which, given its apparent dimensions, means that NGC 5701 is about 65,000 light years across. Based on redshift the galaxy lies at a distance of 85 million light years. It was discovered by William Herschel on April 29, 1786.

== Characteristics ==
=== Central region ===
The galaxy is categorised as a barred lenticular galaxy. The bar is faint and diffuse, and almost completely dust-free. At its ends it has elevated brightness, forming ansae. It surrounds a large, bright and slightly elliptical bulge with a bright nucleus. The bar lies inside a disk which mostly lacks features, with the exception of some knots or possible companion galaxies. The bar is strong and dominates the disk, while the bulge component could overlap with the disk, making the galaxy appear to lack a disk. The lack of disk however could be the result of a model that lacks the bar as different models indicate the presence of the disk. An inner ring is detectable at the end of the bar.

The stellar population in the barlens is mostly old, as 70–85% of the stellar mass is older than 10 billion years. The intermediate age stars are more common at the outer edges of the barlens. The bar doesn't show to induse star formation. At the centre the metallicity is solar and becomes subsolar towards the edges, and is higher than that of the bulge of the Milky Way. Gas and stellar velocity fields are slightly offset with each other as indicated by the position angles of their major axes. The isophotes indicate that the bar is also misaligned with the stellar velocity field.

The nucleus of the galaxy has been found to be active and based on its emission lines has been identified as a transitional object between an HII region and a LINER. The most accepted theory for the energy source of active galactic nuclei is the presence of an accretion disk around a supermassive black hole. The mass of the black hole in the centre of NGC 5701 is estimated to be 10^{7.9} (80 million) M_{☉} based on the absolute bulge magnitude.

A faint nuclear spiral is visible in images by the Hubble Space Telescope extending to about 10 arcseconds. As the galaxy is seen nearly face-on it is difficult to detect if an inner disk is present. The nuclear spiral is associated with young stars, whose presence however is negligible as far as the total stellar mass of the bulge is concerned.

=== Outer ring ===
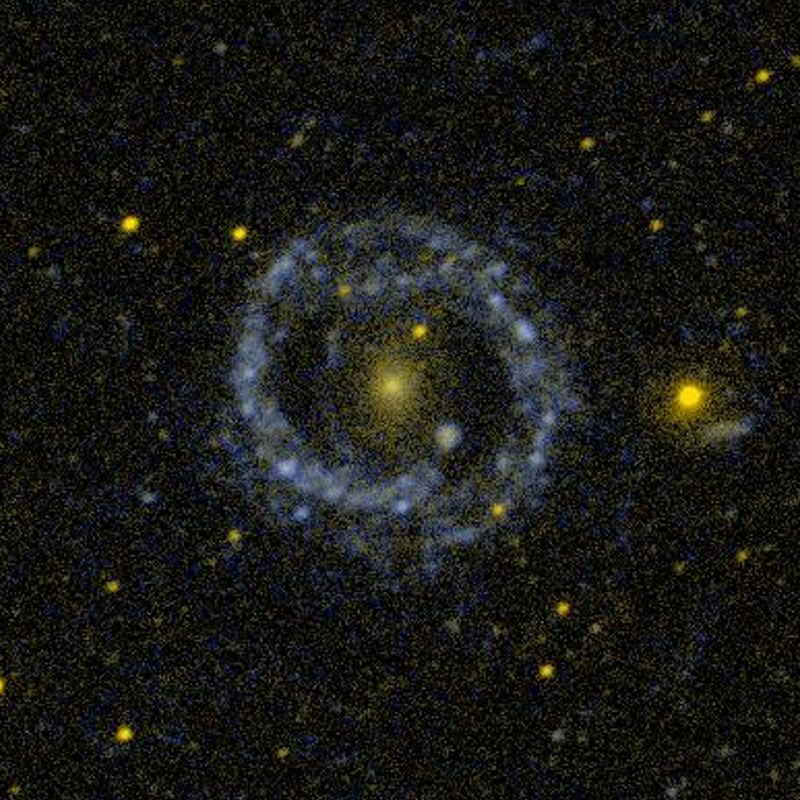
The galaxy in ultraviolet as observed by GALEX, with the ring glowing blue.

The galaxy has an outer pseudo-ring which is more visible in blue light. The ring is created by two arms which emerge from the end of the disk, but they start to branch into smaller arms, creating a ring of multiple fragmented arms. Many HII regions emitting H-alpha are visible in it, indicating it is a location of active star formation. The ring is detached from the disk and gives the galaxy an appearance similar to Hoag's Object. It is possible that the bar prevents the gas infalling to the central region of the galaxy. The ring is elongated perpendicularly to the bar.

=== Hydrogen disk ===
The optical disk is surrounded by a hydrogen envelope which extends to over 10 arcminutes from the nucleus, about two and half times more than the optical edge of the galaxy. The HI emission is about twice as strong at the west of the galaxy than the east but its western edge is sharper. The asymmetry could be the result of a past interaction with another galaxy. Observations by the Arecibo Observatory revealed an HI cloud about 15 arcminutes northwest of the centre but it wasn't detected in observations by the Very Large Array.

== Nearby galaxies ==
NGC 5701 is according to A. M. Garcia a member of the NGC 5746 Group, also known as LGG 386. No companion galaxies are visible in hydrogen line or optical observations. UGC 9385, another member of the group, lies about 56 arcminutes to the west. The group is a member of the Virgo III Groups, a long chain of galaxies extending for about 40 million light years from the Virgo Cluster.
