= NGC 5750 =

Galaxy in the constellation Virgo

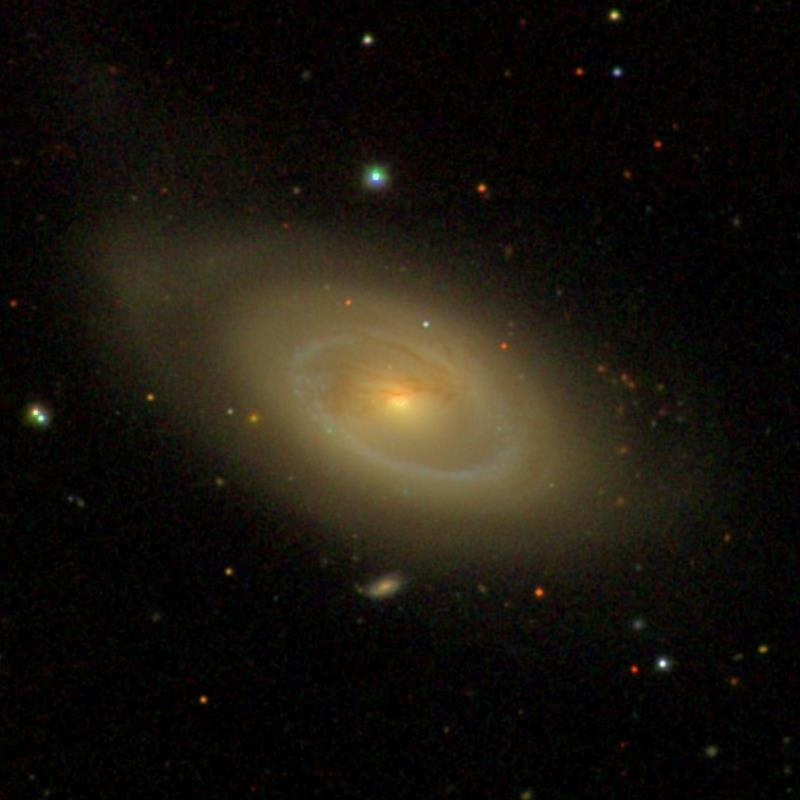
- SDSS image of NGC 5750

Observation data (J2000 epoch)
- Constellation: Virgo
- Right ascension: 14^{h} 46^{m} 11.104^{s}
- Declination: −00° 13′ 22.99″
- Redshift: 0.005554 ± 0.000093
- Heliocentric radial velocity: 1660 km/s
- Apparent magnitude (V): 15.58
- Apparent magnitude (B): 16.23

Characteristics
- Type: SB(r)0/a
- Apparent size (V): 2.420 x 1.646 75 arcminutes (infrared)

Other designations
- UGC 9512, MCG +00-38-006, PGC 52735

NGC 5750 is a barred spiral galaxy with an active galactic nucleus in the constellation Virgo. It was discovered on April 11, 1787 by the astronomer William Herschel. It is a member of the NGC 5746 Group of galaxies, itself one of the Virgo III Groups strung out to the east of the Virgo Supercluster of galaxies.
