= Arp 271 =

Interacting galaxies in the constellation Virgo

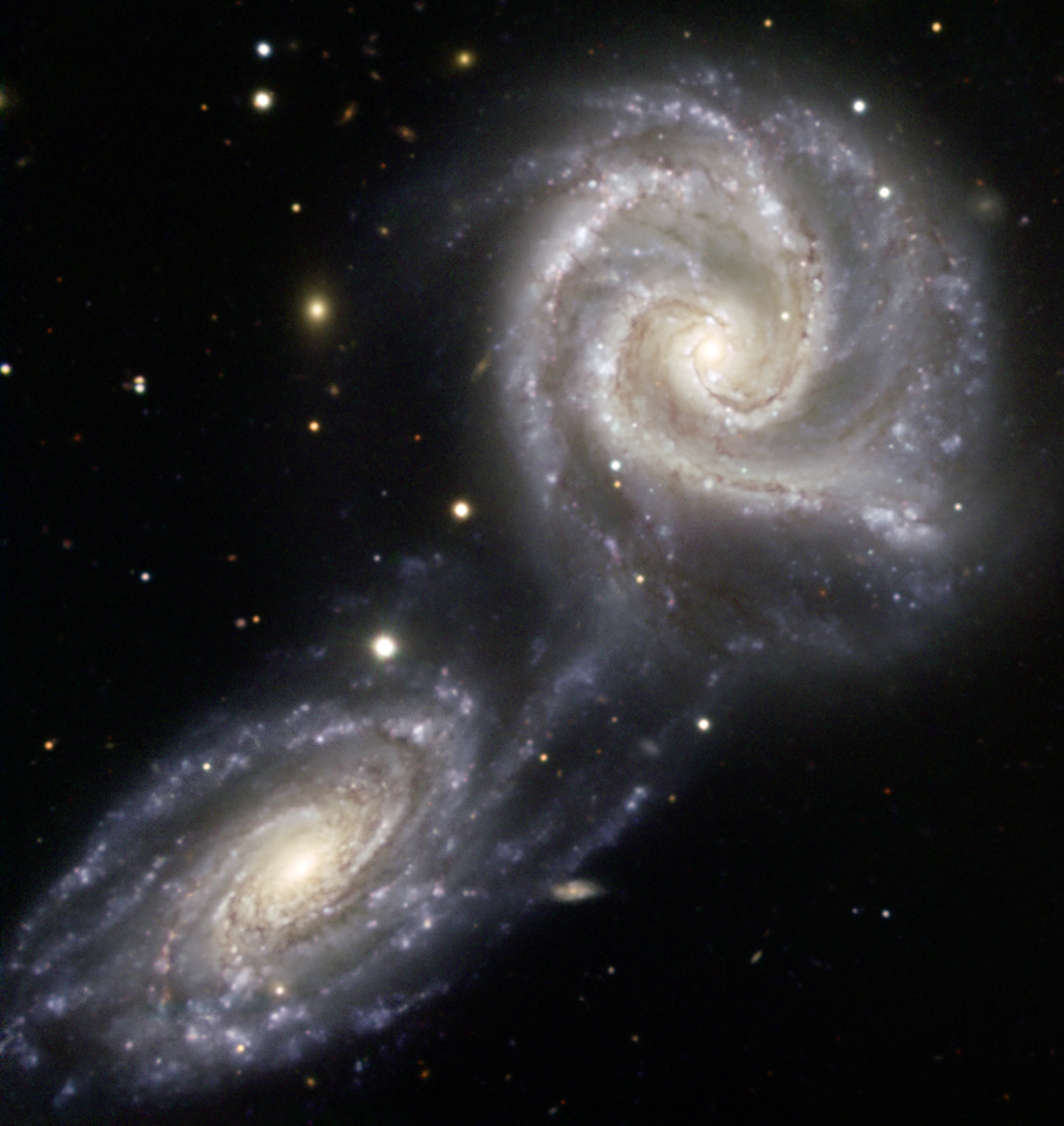
- NGC 5426 (bottom left) and NGC 5427 (top right) imaged by the New Technology Telescope

Observation data (J2000 epoch)
- Constellation: Virgo
- Right ascension: 14^{h} 03^{m} 25.5^{s}
- Declination: −06° 02′ 59″
- Distance: 127 million light-years (39 Mpc)
- Apparent magnitude (V): 11.4

Characteristics
- Type: SA(s)c pec (NGC 5426); SA(s)c pec (NGC 5427)
- Apparent size (V): 2.5

Other designations
- NGC 5426 & NGC 5427, LEDA 50084, VV 21a, [VV2000c] J140325.9-060150, AGC 540006, 2MASX J14032604-0601509, VV 21, [VV2003c] J140325.9-060150, APG 271, MCG-01-36-003, [CHM2007] LDC 1026 J140326.04-0601509, [VV2006c] J140325.9-060150, 6dFGS gJ140326.1-060151, NVSS J140326-060149, [CHM2007] HDC 850 J140326.04-0601509, [VV98c] J140325.9-060150, IRAS 14008-0547, UGCA 380, UGCA 381 [HB91] 1400-057.

Arp 271 is a pair of similarly sized interacting spiral galaxies, NGC 5426 and NGC 5427, in the constellation of Virgo. It is not certain whether the galaxies are going to eventually collide or not. They will continue interacting for tens of millions of years, creating new stars as a result of the mutual gravitational attraction between the galaxies, a pull seen in the bridge of stars already connecting the two. Located about 130 million light-years away, the Arp 271 pair is about 130,000 light-years across. It was originally discovered in 1785 by William Herschel. It is speculated, that the Milky Way will undergo a similar collision in about five billion years with the neighboring Andromeda Galaxy, which is currently located about 2.5 million light-years away.

== Supernovae in NGC 5426 ==
Two supernovae have been observed in NGC 5426:

- SN 1991B (Type Ia, mag. 16) was discovered by The Berkeley Automated Supernova Search on 11 January 1991.
- SN 2009mz (Type Ia, mag. 15.1) was discovered by Berto Monard on 26 December 2009.

== Supernovae in NGC 5427 ==
Two supernovae have been observed in NGC 5427:

- SN 1976D (Type Ia, mag. 14.5) was discovered by Richard A. Wade on 25 August 1976.
- SN 2021pfs (Type Ia, mag. 19.4295) was discovered by the Automatic Learning for the Rapid Classification of Events (ALeRCE) on 9 June 2021.

== Gallery ==
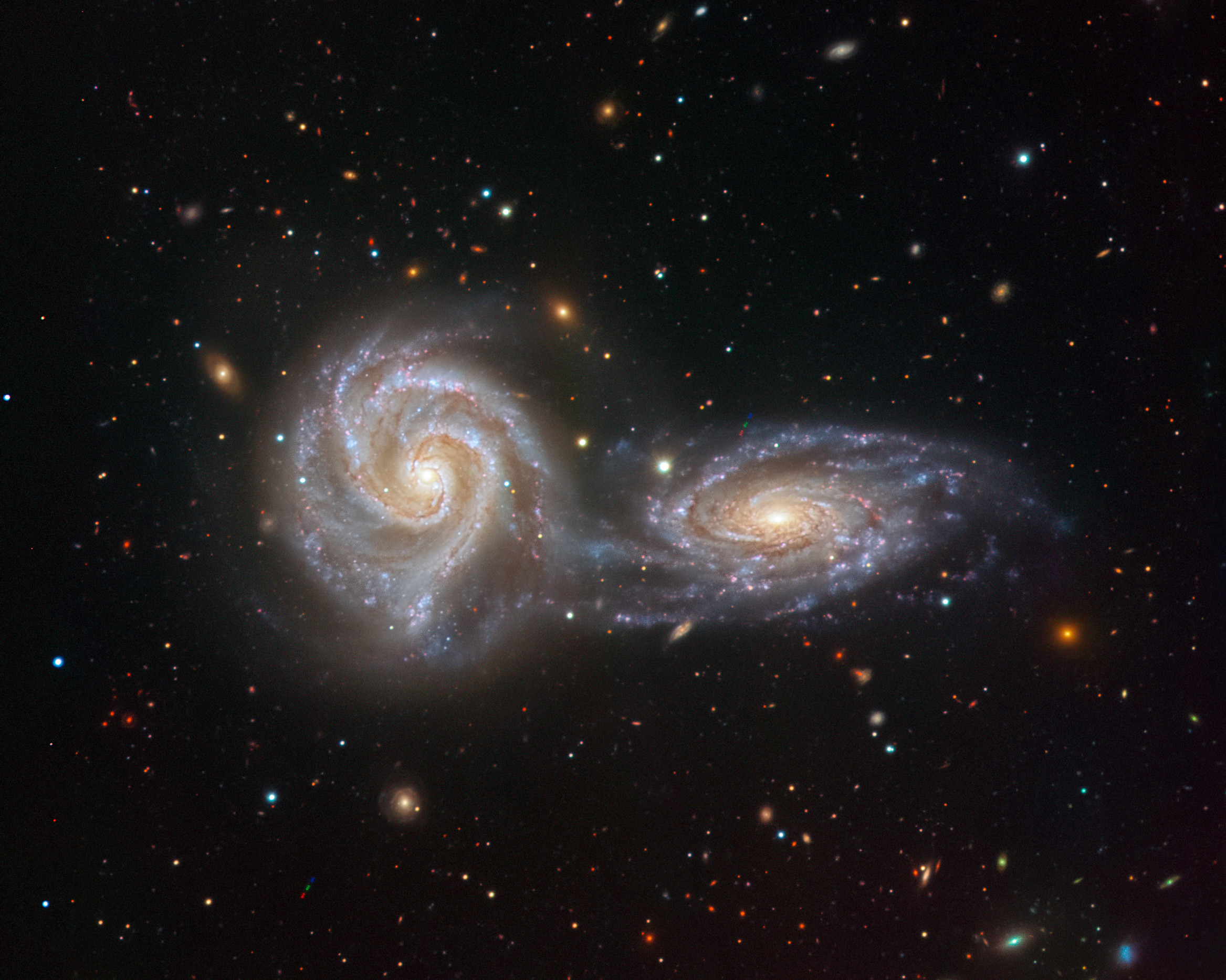
Arp 271 taken by the VIMOS instrument on ESO's Very Large Telescope.

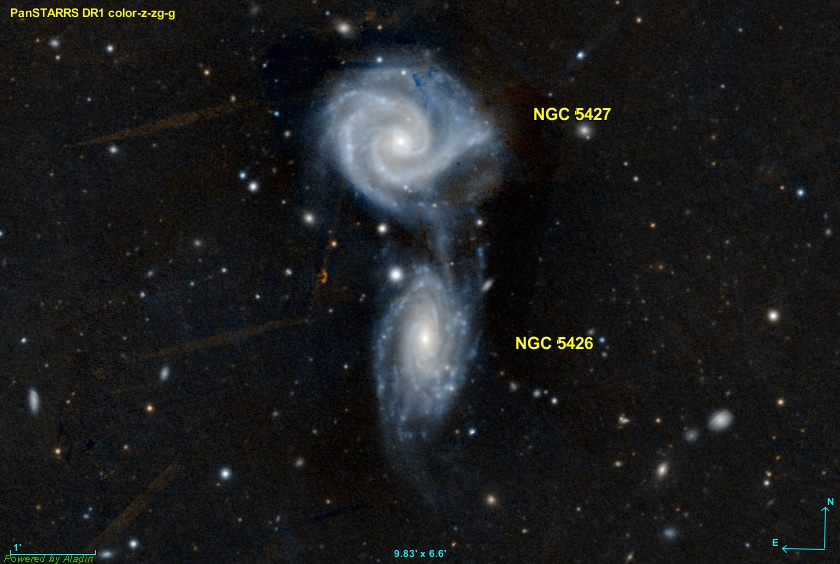
Arp 271, differentiated as NGC 5427 and 5426, taken by PanSTARRS
