= NGC 5746 =

Spiral galaxy in the constellation Virgo

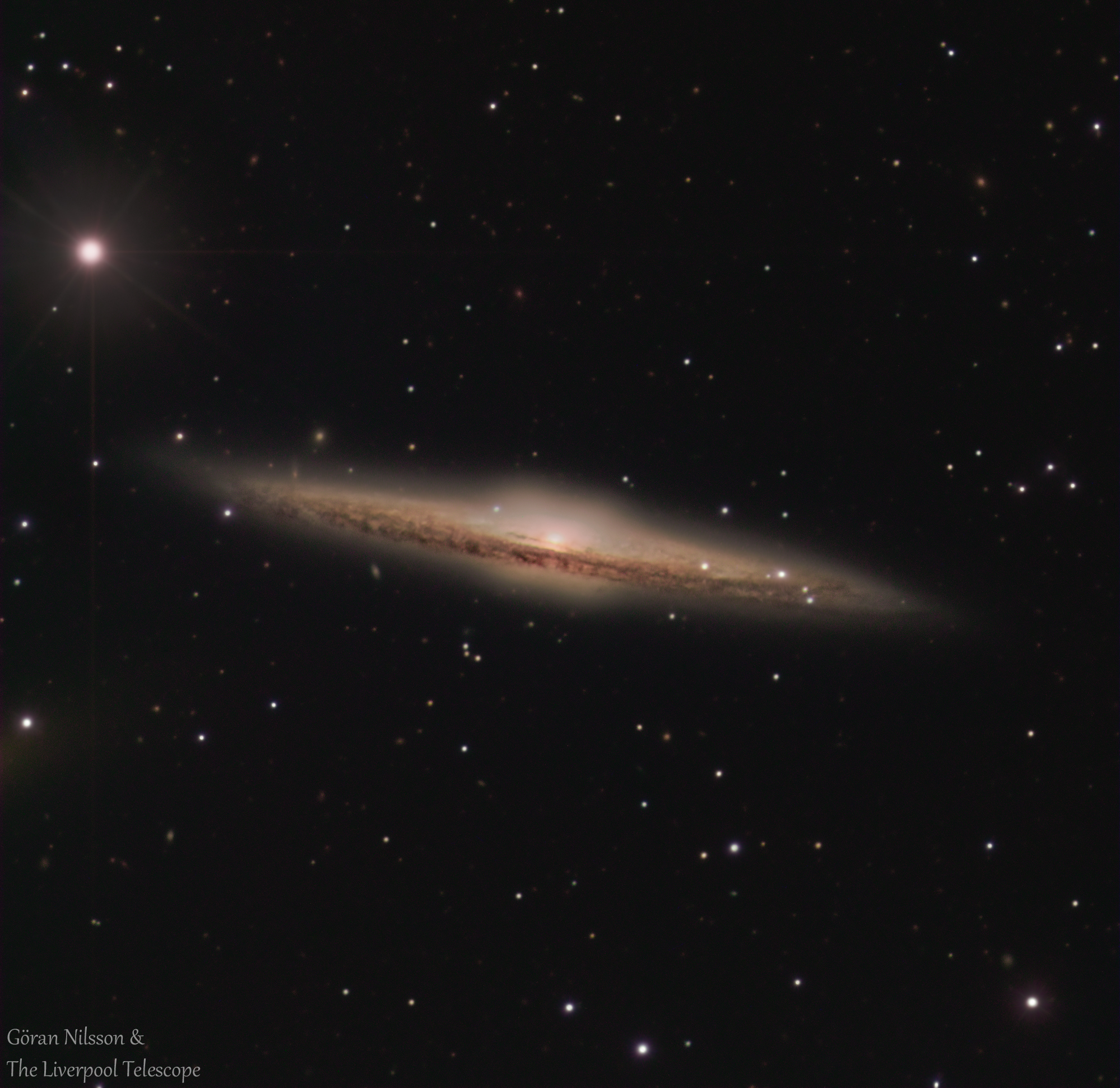
- NGC 5746 imaged by the Liverpool Telescope

Observation data (J2000 epoch)
- Constellation: Virgo
- Right ascension: 14^{h} 44^{m} 55.918^{s}
- Declination: +01° 57′ 18.011″
- Redshift: 0.005764
- Heliocentric radial velocity: 1728 ± 2 km/s
- Distance: 99 Mly
- Group or cluster: NGC 5746 Group (LGG 386)
- Apparent magnitude (V): 11.0

Characteristics
- Type: SAB(rs)b? edge-on
- Size: ~194,300 ly (59.56 kpc) (estimated)
- Apparent size (V): 7.4′ × 1′.

Other designations
- IRAS 14424+0209, UGC 9499, MCG +00-38-005, PGC 52665, CGCG 020-012

NGC 5746 (also known as the Mini Sombrero Galaxy or the Blade and Pearl Galaxy) is a barred spiral galaxy located in the eastern part of the constellation of Virgo. It was discovered on 24 February 1786 by German-British astronomer William Herschel. It is the lead member of the NGC 5746 Group of galaxies (also known as LGG 386), itself one of the Virgo III Groups strung out to the east of the Virgo Supercluster of galaxies.

== Characteristics ==
NGC 5746 is located at a distance of 99 million light years and is seen nearly edge-on, bearing a strong resemblance with the galaxy NGC 4565, that is also seen nearly edge-on.

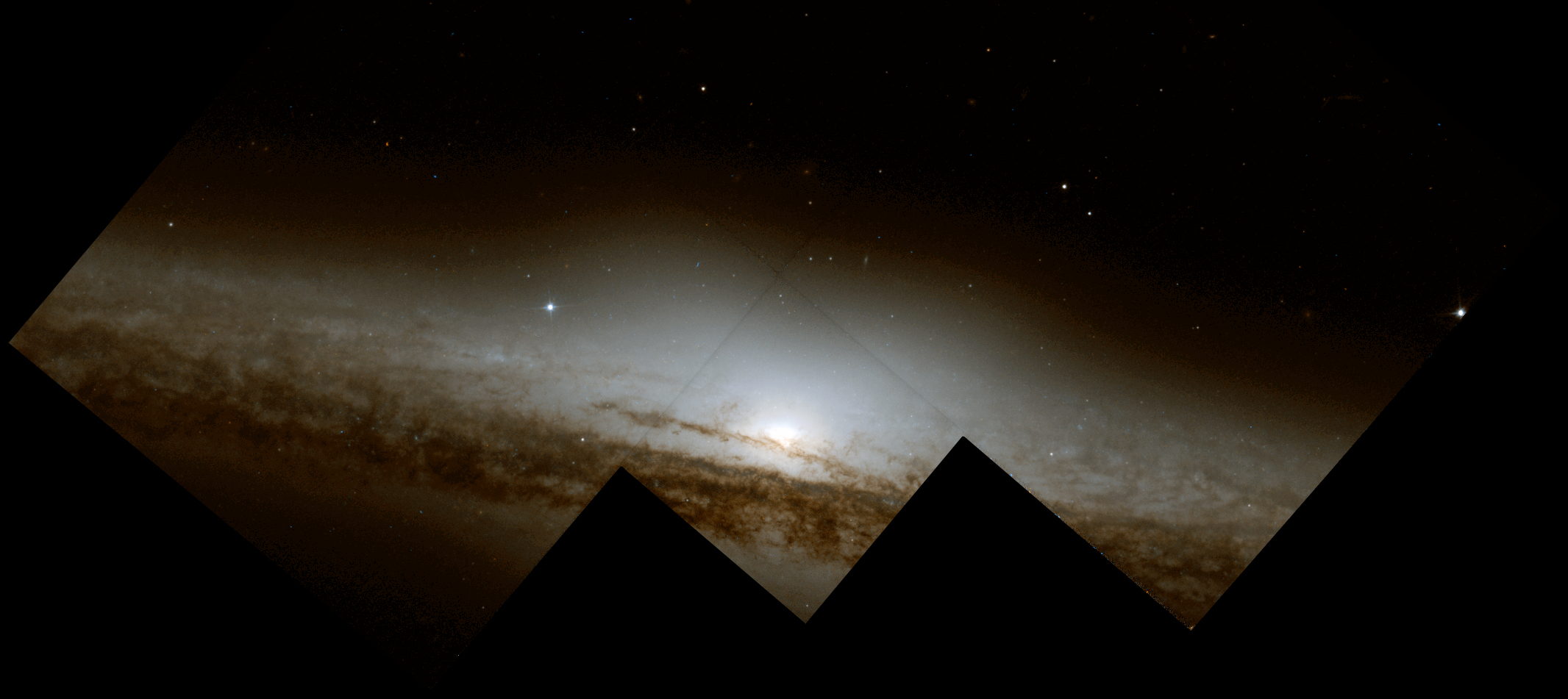
Galaxy NGC 5746, by HST

As with the former, it has a box-shaped bulge that is actually a bar seen from one side and a currently modest star formation activity.

Investigations with the help of the x-ray space telescope Chandra seemed to detect a large cloud of gas surrounding NGC 5746 that was thought to be remnant gas of its formation in the process of being accreted; however, later research has shown that cloud does not actually exist.

Seen in the infrared, NGC 5746 also shows two pseudobulges, one nested within the other – that coincides with its central bar – as well as an inner ring with a radius of 9.1 kiloparsecs and a width of 1.6 kiloparsecs.

== Supernova ==
One supernova has been observed in NGC 5746: SN 1983P (Type Ia, mag. 13) was discovered by Nunes, Pellegreni, et al. on 11 July 1983.

== See also ==
- List of NGC objects (5001–6000)
