= Virgo III Cloud =

Series of galaxy clusters

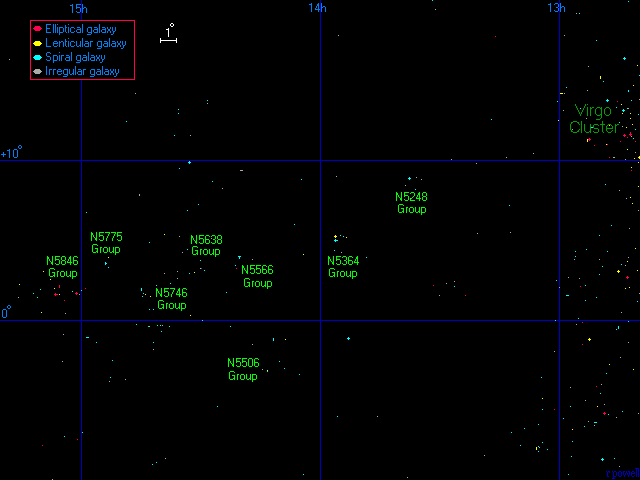
- The Virgo III Groups of galaxies

Observation data (Epoch )
- Parent structure: Virgo Supercluster
- Major axis: 11.3 Mpc (37 Mly)
- Minor axis: 5.7 Mpc (19 Mly)
- Redshift: ~2000 km/s
- Distance: 26.70 Mpc (87 Mly)

Other designations
- Virgo III Groups, Virgo III Cloud, Virgo-Libra Cloud

The Virgo III Groups, Virgo III Cloud, or the Virgo-Libra Cloud is a galaxy filament consisting of at least 13 galaxy groups. It is located approximately 87 Mly (27 Mpc) from the Solar System.

The Virgo III Cloud, like the Leo Cloud, is prolate and points toward the Virgo Cluster.

== List of groups ==
Below is a list of groups in the Virgo III Cloud according to astronomer Brent Tully.

Column 1: The name of the group in Tully's NBGG
Column 2: The right ascension for epoch 2000.
Column 3: The declination for epoch 2000.
Column 4: Number of members of the group.
Column 5: Brightest member of the group
Column 6: Redshift of the group.
Column 7: Distance of the group (Millions of light-years).
Column 8: Cross-Identifications with other catalogs.

(Sources for data columns:)

Groups within the Virgo III Cloud
Name of group	R.A. (J2000)	Dec. (J2000)	Number of members	Brightest member	Redshift	Distance (Mly)	Cross-ID
NBGC 41-1	15h 06m 29.7s	01d 36m 08s	11 (Tully); 9 (Fourque); 8 (Garcia); 13 (Giuricin)	NGC 5846	0.005834	86	NGC 5846 Group, GHCG 150, RXC J1506.4+0136, [FWB89] GrG 70, BAX 226.3853+01.6963, RXGCC 589,[N93] 146, DV 50, MCXC J1506.4+0136, XCLASS 366, [TSK2008] 668 LGG 393, NOGG H 830, NOGG P1 836, NOGG P2 852
NBGC 41-2	14h 53m 24.6s	03d 32m 34s	14 (Tully); 11 (Fourque); 22 (Garcia); 26/12/12 (Giuricin)	NGC 5746	0.005087	77	NOTE: Garcia considers the NGC 5746 Group and the NGC 5775 Group described by Fouque et al. to be two subgroups of a larger NGC 5746 Group or 41-2.; NGC 5746 Group, NGC 5775 Group, LGG 386, LGG 387, NOGG H 806, NOGG P1 812, NOGG P2 828
NBGC 41-3	14h 20m 38.3s	03d 40m 13s	8 (Tully); 5 (Fourque); 6 (Garcia); 5/6/6 (Giuricin)	NGC 5566	0.005117	80	NGC 5566 Group, NGC 5638 Group LGG 379, NOGG H 779, NOGG P1 781, NOGG P2 797, NGC 5560 Group, NOGG H 777
NBGC 41-4	14h 11m 55.1s	-02d 15m 46s	3 (Tully); 5 (Garcia); 3/6/6 (Giuricin)	NGC 5496	0.005257	80	NGC 5496 Group, LGG 377, NOGG H 765, NOGG P1 773, NOGG P2 789, NGC 5506 Group, NOGG P1 770
NBGC 41-5	14h 32m 25.8s	08d 04m 43s	2 (Tully)	NGC 5665	0.007461	70	
NBGC 41-6	15h 09m 16.1s	-11d 19m 18s	2 (Tully)	NGC 5861	0.006174	83	
NBGC 41-7	13h 54m 37.6s	04d 58m 16s	5 (Tully); 5 (Fourque); 7 (Garcia); 4/7/5 (Giuricin)	NGC 5364	0.004206	68	NGC 5364 Group, LGG 362, NOGG H 736, NOGG P1 745, NOGG P2 761
NBGC 41-8	13h 37m 32.0s	08d 53m 07s	3 (Tully); 3 (Fourque); 3 (Giuricin)	NGC 5248	0.003839	64	NGC 5248 Group, NOGG H 724, NOGG P1 735, NOGG P2 751
NBGC 41-10	15h 13m 45.7s	-14d 16m 11s	3 (Tully)	NGC 5878	0.006641	99	
NBGC 41-11	15h 19m 37.1s	-23d 50m 36s	3 (Tully); 3 (Fourque); 5 (Garcia); 3/5/5 (Giuricin)	NGC 5903	0.007972	114	NGC 5898 Group, LGG 398, NGC 5903 Group, NOGG H 837, NOGG P1 847, NOGG P2 862
NBGC 41-12	14h 06m 44.3s	-05d 36m 38s	2 (Tully); 4 (Fourque); 4 (Garcia); 4/5/5 (Giuricin)	NGC 5427	0.008733	110	NOTE: NED considers 42-12 to be the main subgroup of the NGC 5427 Group; NGC 5427 Group, LGG 374, NOGG H 760, NOGG P1 768, NOGG P2 783
NBGC 41-13	14h 06m 44.3s	-05d 36m 38s	2 (Tully)	NGC 5468	0.008733	110	NOTE: NED considers 42-13 to be a subgroup of the NGC 5427 Group
NBGC 41-14	14h 24m 13.2s	-16d 43m 23s	2 (Tully); 2 (Giuricin)	NGC 5595	0.009043	102	NGC 5595 Group, NOGG H 784, NOGG P1 787, NOGG P2 803

== See also ==
- Virgo II Groups
