= NGC 5084 =

Galaxy in the constellation Virgo

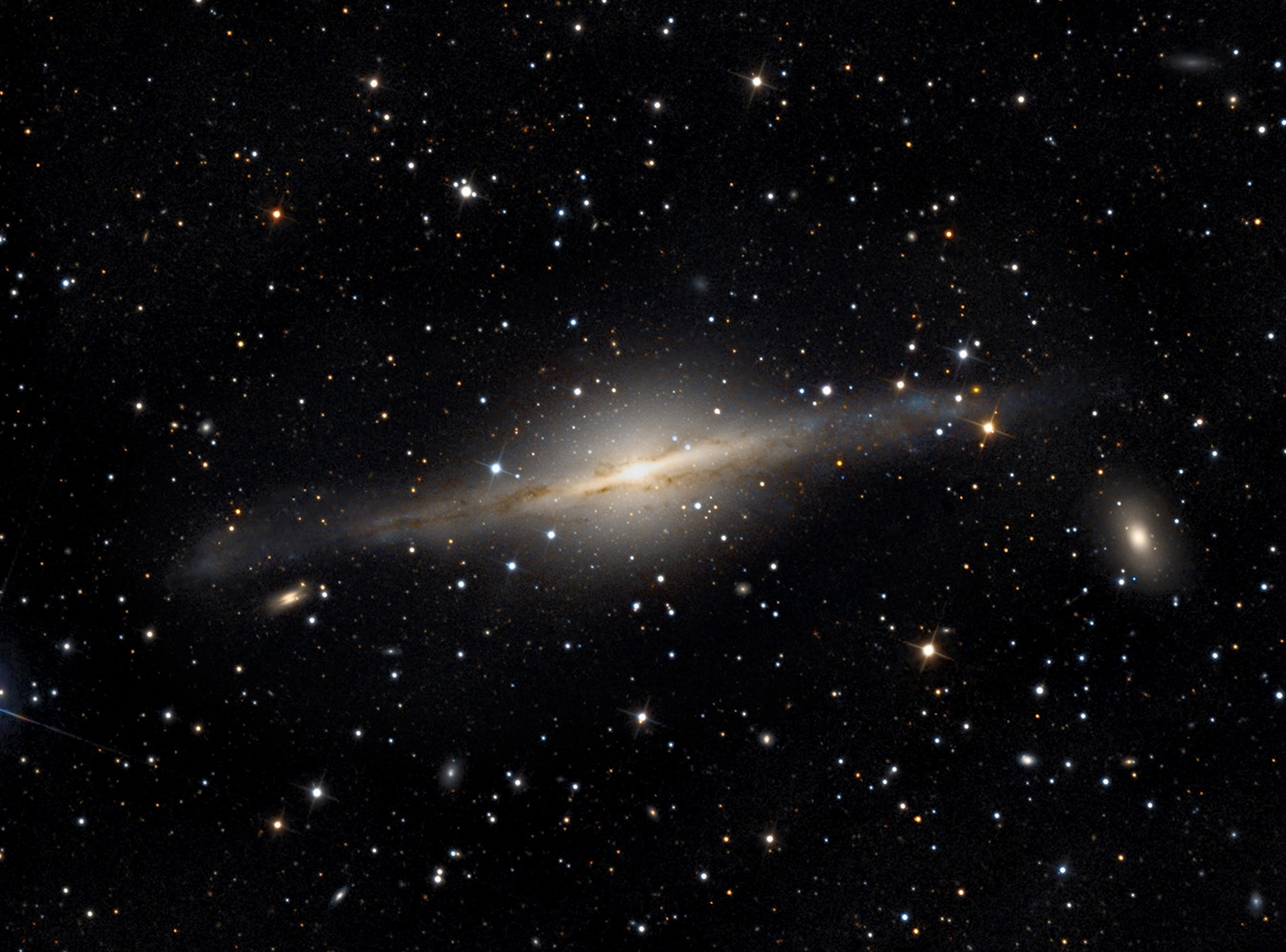
- NGC 5084 by 32 in Schulman Telescope

Observation data (J2000 epoch)
- Constellation: Virgo
- Right ascension: 13^{h} 20^{m} 16.8346^{s}
- Declination: −21° 49′ 38.416″
- Redshift: 0.005741±0.000010
- Heliocentric radial velocity: 1,721±3 km/s
- Galactocentric velocity: 1,599±6 km/s
- Distance: 81.87 ± 5.871 Mly (25.1 ± 1.8 Mpc)h^{−1}_{0.6774} (Comoving); 97 Mly (29.74 Mpc)h^{−1}_{0.6774} (Light-travel)
- Group or cluster: NGC 5084 Group
- Apparent magnitude (V): 12.21
- Apparent magnitude (B): 11.15
- magnitude (J): 8.014±0.018
- magnitude (H): 7.256±0.020
- magnitude (K): 7.058±0.027

Characteristics
- Type: S0
- Mass: (6–10)×10^{12} M_{☉}
- Size: 769,500 ly × 115,430 ly (235.93 kpc × 35.39 kpc) (diameter; 90% total B-band light) (Note: The quick-look major axis physical diameters given by NED of 422.55 by 63.38 kiloparsecs (1,380,000 by 207,000 light-years) and 104.11 by 39.56 kiloparsecs (340,000 by 129,000 light-years) were based on a distance estimate of 44.700 ± 42.360 megaparsecs (145.8 ± 138.2 million light-years). The quoted diameters in this infobox were based on NED's provided scale "Virgo + GA + Shapley" of 121 pc/arcsec multiplied by the given angular diameters.); 189,760 ly × 72,048 ly (58.18 kpc × 22.09 kpc) (diameter; "total" magnitude)
- Apparent size (V): 12.02′ × 2.75′
- Notable features: Supermassive disk galaxy

Other designations
- ESO 576- G 033, MCG -04-32-004, PGC 46525

NGC 5084 is a Seyfert 2 lenticular galaxy in the constellation of Virgo. It is located at a distance of about 25.1 megaparsecs (81.9 million light-years) from Earth, which, given its apparent dimensions using the 90% total light definition, means that NGC 5084 is 236 kiloparsecs (770,000 light-years) across. It is one of the largest and most massive galaxies in the Virgo Supercluster. William Herschel discovered it on March 10, 1785. It is a member of the NGC 5084 Group of galaxies, which is a member of the Virgo II Groups, a series of galaxies and galaxy clusters strung out from the southern edge of the Virgo Supercluster. The galaxy is seen nearly edge-on, with inclination 86°, and features a warped disk and large quantities of HI gas extending along the disk, probably accumulated after multiple accretions of smaller galaxies. NGC 5084 also possess an active galactic nucleus.

== Mass and size estimates ==
NGC 5084 is a very massive system, with a high rotational speed of about 328 km/s. It is categorised as a supermassive disk galaxy. Gottesen (1986) estimated based on the rotational speed that the mass of NGC 5084 is 8.5×10^{11} M_{☉} and its radius to be 34 kpc for an estimated distance of 15.5 Mpc. Gottesman et al. (2002) using the same method adopted as distance the 30 Mpc and calculated the mass of NGC 5084 to be 1.7×10^{12} M_{☉}. Koribalski et al. (2004) measured the rotational speed of NGC 5084 to be 334 km/s and calculated its mass to be 1.3×10^{12} M_{☉} and its radius was estimated at 50 kpc. Carrignan et al. (1997) measured the velocity differences and projected separations of nine galaxies they identified as satellites of NGC 5084 and using different equations they estimated the mass of NGC 5084 to be between 6×10^{12} M_{☉} and 1×10^{13} M_{☉}, which was at that time the highest mass ever derived for a disk galaxy. They estimated the optical diameter of NGC 5084 to be 74 kpc.

An estimation of NGC 5084's size using the 90% total light definition yields a very substantial apparent diameter of 1,949.84 arcseconds, which corresponds to a diameter of 235.93 kiloparsecs (770,000 light-years) assuming the currently accepted distance to the galaxy. This would make it one of the largest known lenticular and supermassive disk galaxies.

== Nearby galaxies ==
NGC 5084 is the largest galaxy in the NGC 5084 group or known as LGG 345, which also includes NGC 5087 and NGC 5134, ESO 576-50 and ESO 576-40. The galaxy group is compact, showing little redshift dispersion. NGC 5068 is a foreground galaxy. Other nearby galaxy groups include the NGC 5078 group, which includes NGC 5078, NGC 5061, and NGC 5101, and NGC 4965 group. NGC 5084 is located at end of Virgo II groups, a filament of galaxy groups that extends southwards from the Virgo Cluster, and is part of the Virgo Supercluster.

== See also ==
- NGC 1961 - a supermassive spiral galaxy
- UGC 12591 - a supermassive lenticular/spiral galaxy

== Gallery ==
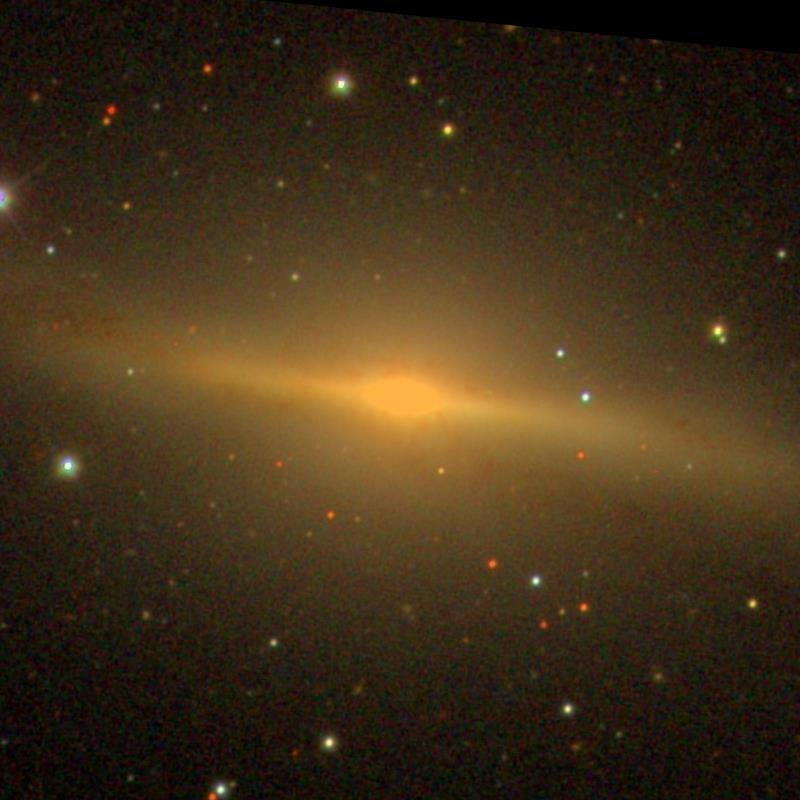
NGC 5084 (SDSS DR14)

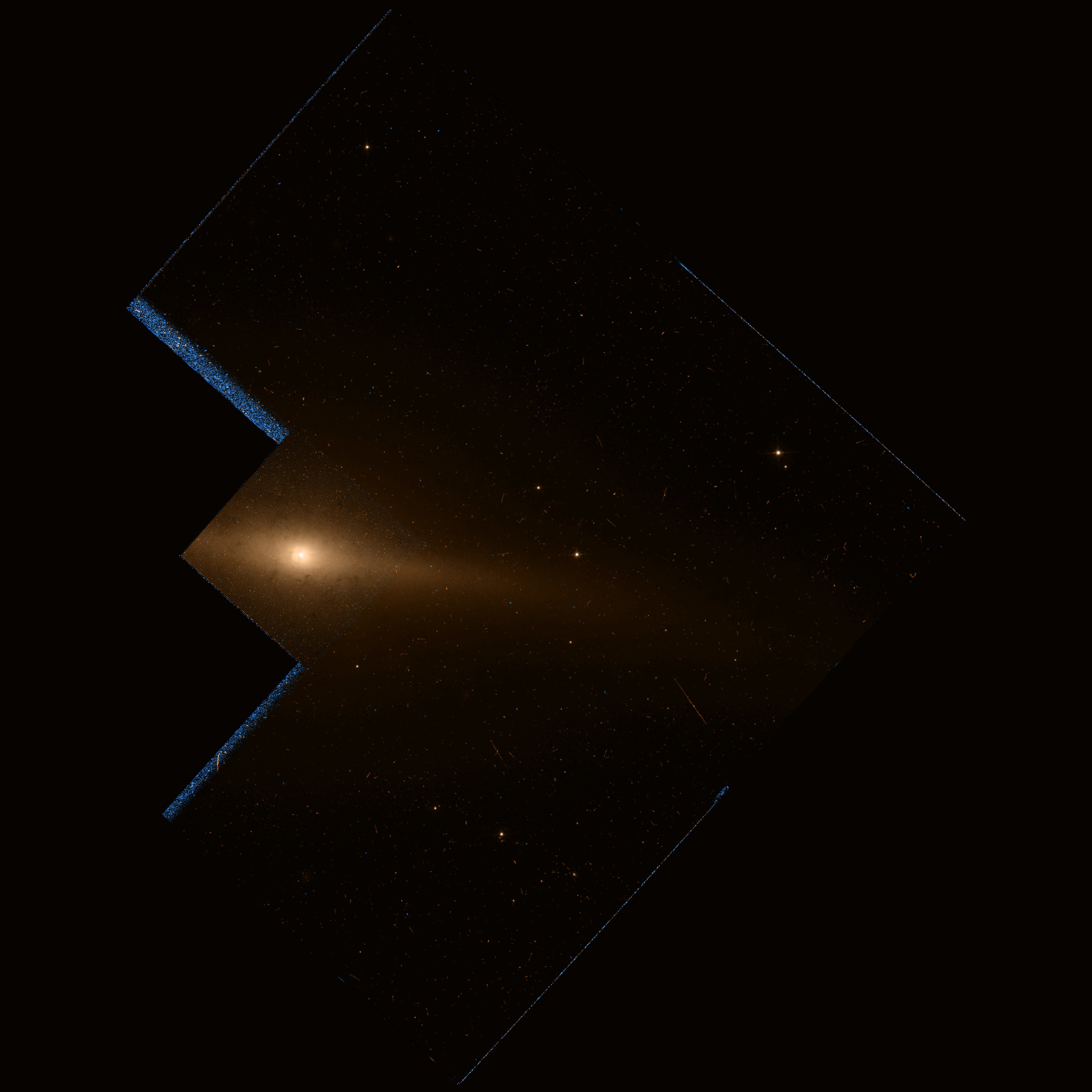
NGC 5084 by Hubble Space Telescope

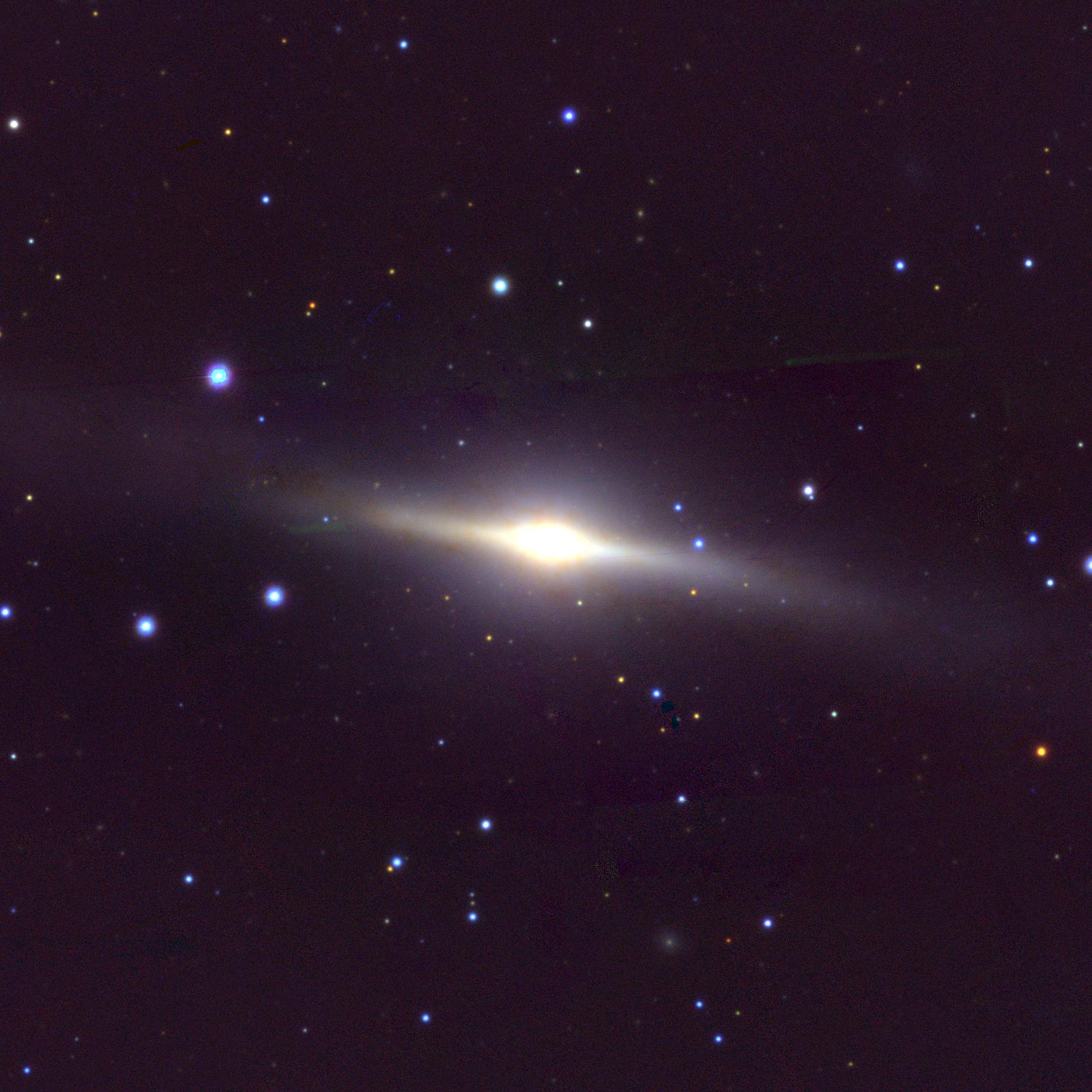
Pan-STARRS image of NGC 5084

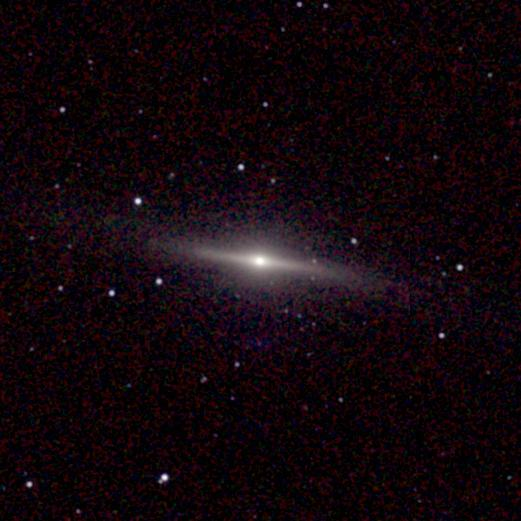
NGC 5084 by 2MASS
