= NGC 5085 =

Galaxy in the constellation Hydra

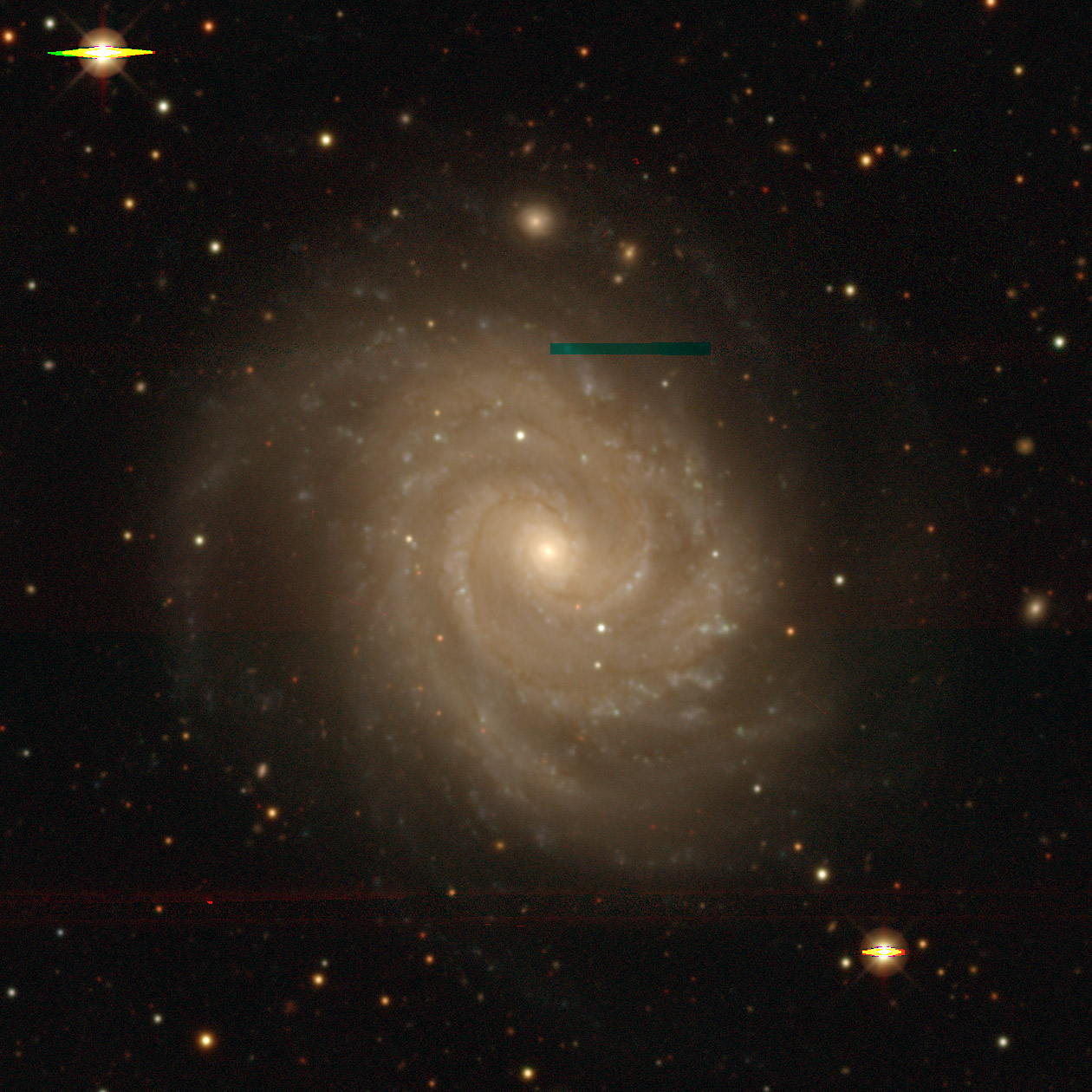
- NGC 5085 imaged by Legacy Surveys

Observation data (J2000 epoch)
- Constellation: Hydra
- Right ascension: 13^{h} 20^{m} 17.7702^{s}
- Declination: −24° 26′ 22.929″
- Redshift: 0.006525 ± 0.000010
- Heliocentric radial velocity: 1,956 ± 3 km/s
- Distance: 90.7 ± 31.9 Mly (27.8 ± 9.8 Mpc)
- Group or cluster: NGC 5078 Group
- Apparent magnitude (V): 11.7

Characteristics
- Type: SA(s)c
- Size: ~131,000 ly (40.3 kpc) (estimated)
- Apparent size (V): 3.4′ × 3.0′

Other designations
- ESO 508- G 050, AM 1317-241, IRAS 13175-2410, UGCA 349, MCG -04-32-005, PGC 46531

NGC 5085 is a barred spiral galaxy in the constellation Hydra. The galaxy lies about 90 million light years away from Earth, which means, given its apparent dimensions, that NGC 5085 is approximately 130,000 light years across. It was discovered by William Herschel on March 26, 1789.

The galaxy has a small but bright bulge with elliptical shape. Two prominent low-surface brightness spiral arms emerge from the bulge in a grand design pattern. After about half a revolution the arms begin to branch. They can be traced for about a full revolution before fading. The kinematics of the galaxy indicate that the arms start about 14 arcseconds from the nucleus while the symmetrical pattern ends a bit further away than the 42 arcseconds radius from the centre of the galaxy. Dust lanes are visible running inside each of the two principal arms for the first half of their length. The outer disk has a flocculent pattern with many dust lanes and spiral fragments. There are many HII regions along both the inner and outer arms. The star formation rate of the galaxy is estimated to be 3.4 M_{☉} per year.

NGC 5085 is a member of the NGC 5078 Group, also known as LGG 341. Other members of the group include NGC 5061, IC 879, NGC 5078, IC 874, IC 4231, and NGC 5101. It lies in the same galaxy cloud as NGC 5084.
