= NGC 6769 =

Galaxy in the constellation Pavo

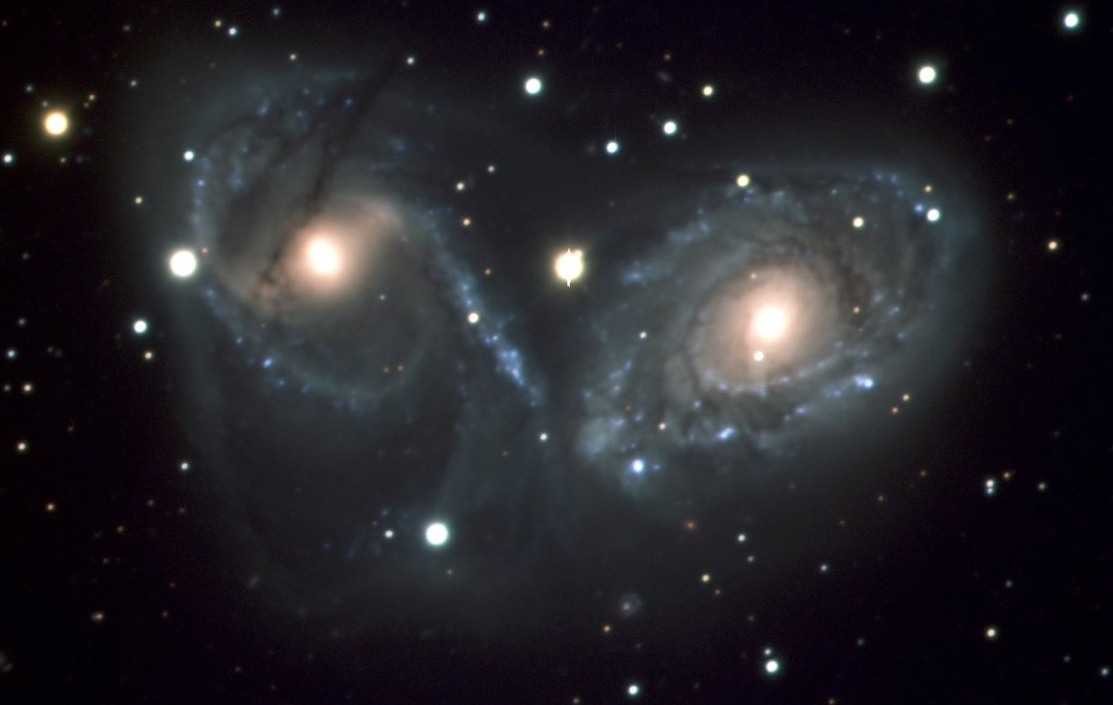
- NGC 6769 (right) with NGC 6770 (left) imaged by ESO's Very Large Telescope

Observation data (J2000 epoch)
- Constellation: Pavo
- Right ascension: 19^{h} 18^{m} 22.5975^{s}
- Declination: −60° 30′ 03.208″
- Redshift: 0.012886±0.000127
- Heliocentric radial velocity: 3,863±38 km/s
- Distance: 183.2 ± 13.1 Mly (56.16 ± 4.01 Mpc)
- Group or cluster: IC 4845 group (LGG 427)
- Apparent magnitude (V): 12.55

Characteristics
- Type: SAB(r)b pec
- Size: ~384,500 ly (117.90 kpc) (estimated)
- Apparent size (V): 2.3′ × 1.5′

Other designations
- The Devil's Mask, ESO 141-IG 048, PGC 63042, VV 304a

NGC 6769 is a peculiar spiral galaxy in the constellation of Pavo. Its velocity with respect to the cosmic microwave background is 3,807±38 km/s, which corresponds to a Hubble distance of 183.2 ± 13.1 Mly (56.16 ± 4.01 Mpc). It was discovered by British astronomer John Herschel on 11 August 1836.

NGC 6769 along with NGC 6770 are listed as VV 304 in the catalog of Vorontsov-Vel'yaminov Interacting Galaxies. Together with NGC 6771, the grouping of the 3 galaxies is sometimes called "The Devil's Mask."

== IC 4845 group ==
NGC 6769 is a member of the IC 4845 galaxy group (also known as LGG 427), which contains 14 members, including NGC 6739, NGC 6746, NGC 6770, NGC 6782, IC 4827, IC 4828, IC 4831, IC 4838, IC 4842, IC 4845, IC 4866, and ESO 141-21.

== Supernovae ==
Two supernovae have been observed in NGC 6769:

- SN 1997de (Type Ia, mag. 18.2) was discovered by Alexander Wassilieff, and independently by Brendan Downs, on 27 August 1997.
- SN 2006ox (type unknown, mag. 15.3) was discovered by Berto Monard on 26 November 2006.

== Image gallery ==
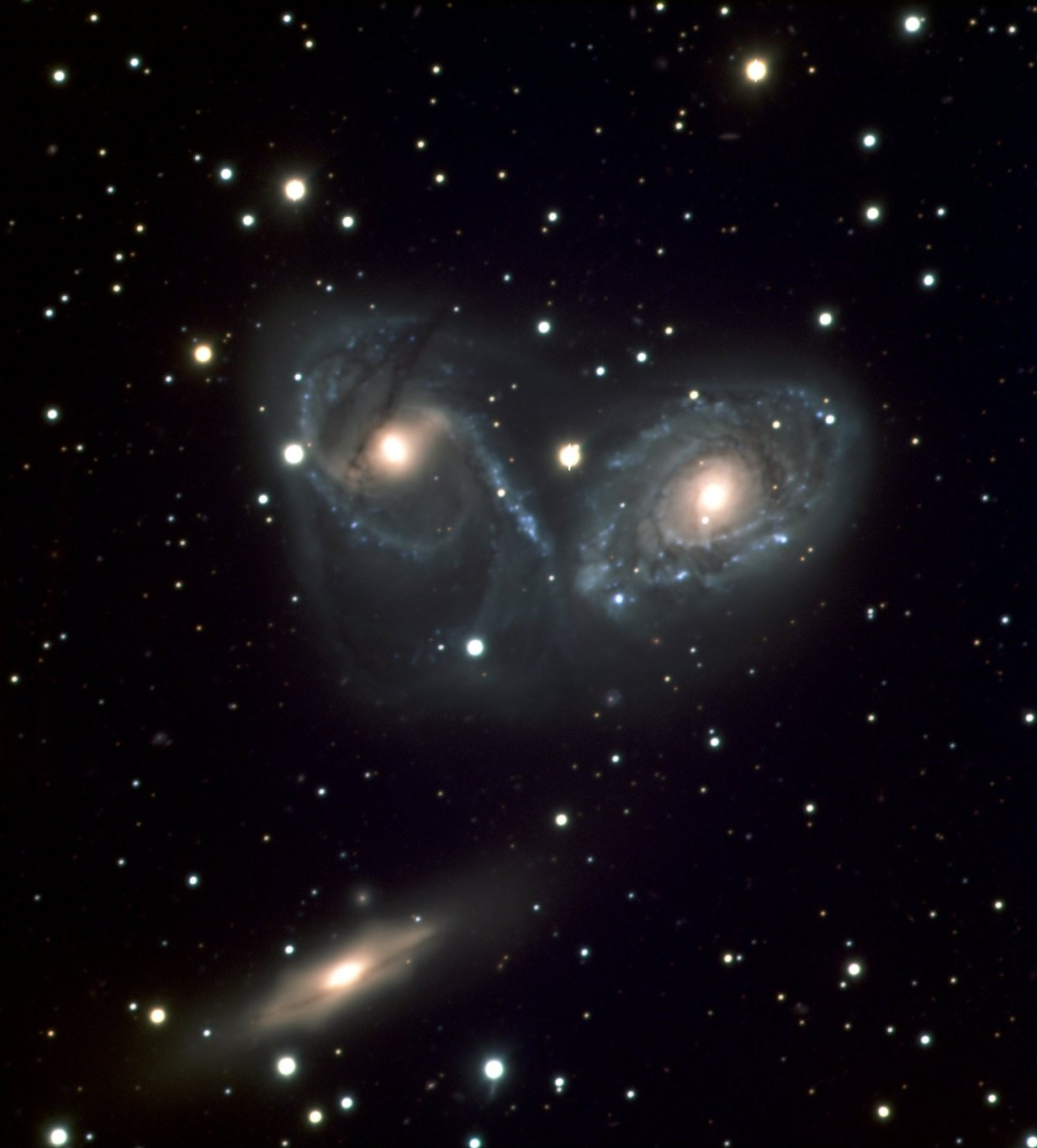
NGC 6769, NGC 6770, and NGC 6771 ("The Devil's Mask") imaged by ESO's Very Large Telescope

== See also ==
- List of NGC objects (6001–7000)
