= NGC 5061 =

Galaxy in the constellation Hydra

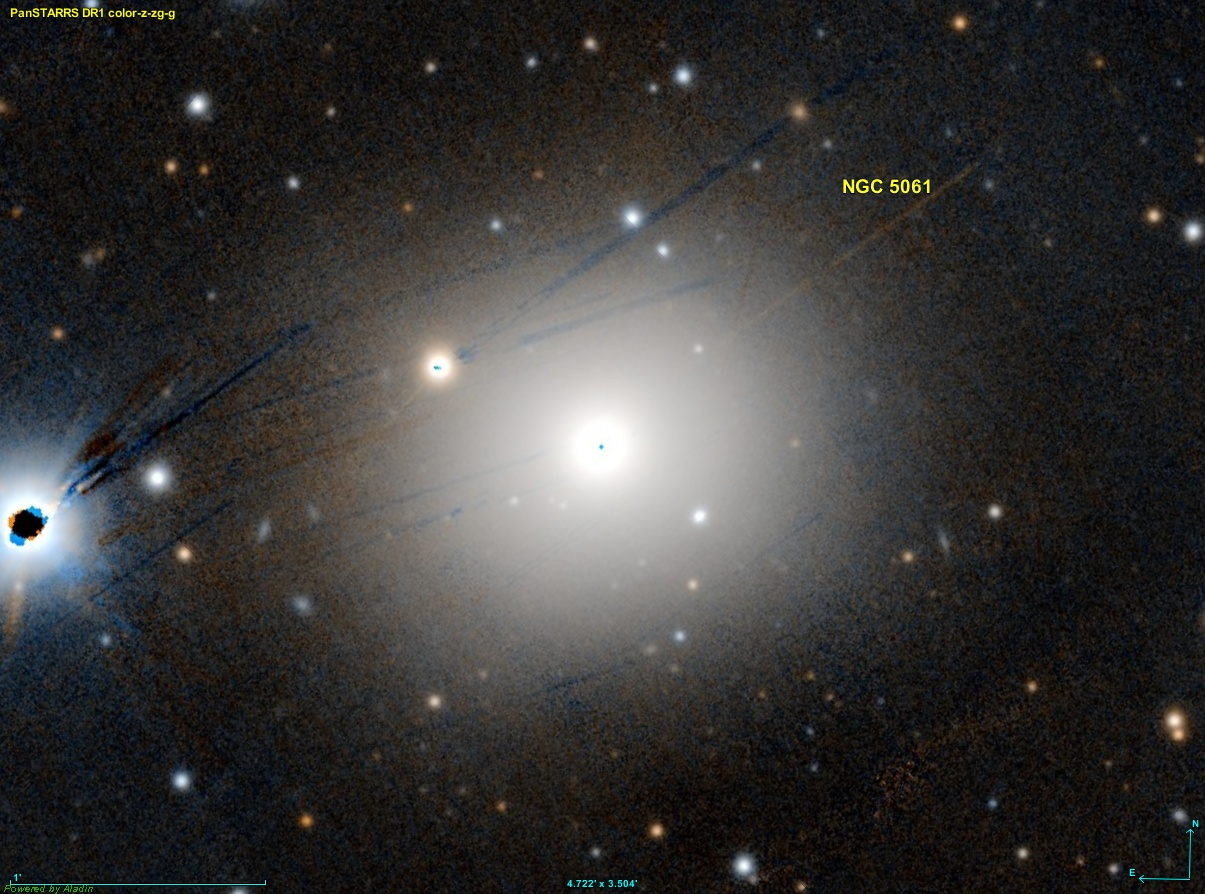
- NGC 5061 imaged by Pan-STARRS

Observation data (J2000 epoch)
- Constellation: Hydra
- Right ascension: 13^{h} 18^{m} 05.1444^{s}
- Declination: −26° 50′ 14.149″
- Redshift: 0.006945±0.0000630
- Heliocentric radial velocity: 2,082±19 km/s
- Distance: 78.54 ± 3.36 Mly (24.080 ± 1.031 Mpc)
- Group or cluster: NGC 5061 group (LGG 341)
- Apparent magnitude (V): 11.44

Characteristics
- Type: E0
- Size: ~178,100 ly (54.61 kpc) (estimated)
- Apparent size (V): 3.5′ × 3.0′

Other designations
- ESO 508- G 038, MCG -04-31-048, PGC 46330

NGC 5061 is an elliptical galaxy in the constellation of Hydra. Its velocity with respect to the cosmic microwave background is 2,383±28 km/s, which corresponds to a Hubble distance of 114.6 ± 8.2 Mly (35.14 ± 2.51 Mpc). However, 25 non-redshift measurements give a closer mean distance of 78.54 ± 3.36 Mly (24.080 ± 1.031 Mpc). It was discovered by German-British astronomer William Herschel on 28 March 1786.

NGC 5061 is a Seyfert II galaxy, i.e. it has a quasar-like nucleus with very high surface brightnesses whose spectra reveal strong, high-ionisation emission lines, but unlike quasars, the host galaxy is clearly detectable.

== NGC 5061 group ==
NGC 5061 is a member of a group of galaxies that bears its name. The NGC 5061 group (also known as LGG 341) contains 10 galaxies, including NGC 5078, NGC 5085, NGC 5101, IC 874, IC 4222, IC 4231, and three galaxies from the ESO catalogue.

== Supernovae ==
Two supernovae have been observed in NGC 5061:

- SN 1996X (Type Ia, mag. 13) was discovered by Robert Evans and Kesao Takamizawa on 12 April 1996. At magnitude 13, it was the brightest supernova of 1996.
- SN 2005cn (Type Ia, mag. 14.6) was discovered by the Brazilian Supernovae Search Team (BRASS) on 19 June 2005.

== See also ==
- List of NGC objects (5001–6000)
