= NGC 5078 =

Spiral galaxy in the constellation Hydra

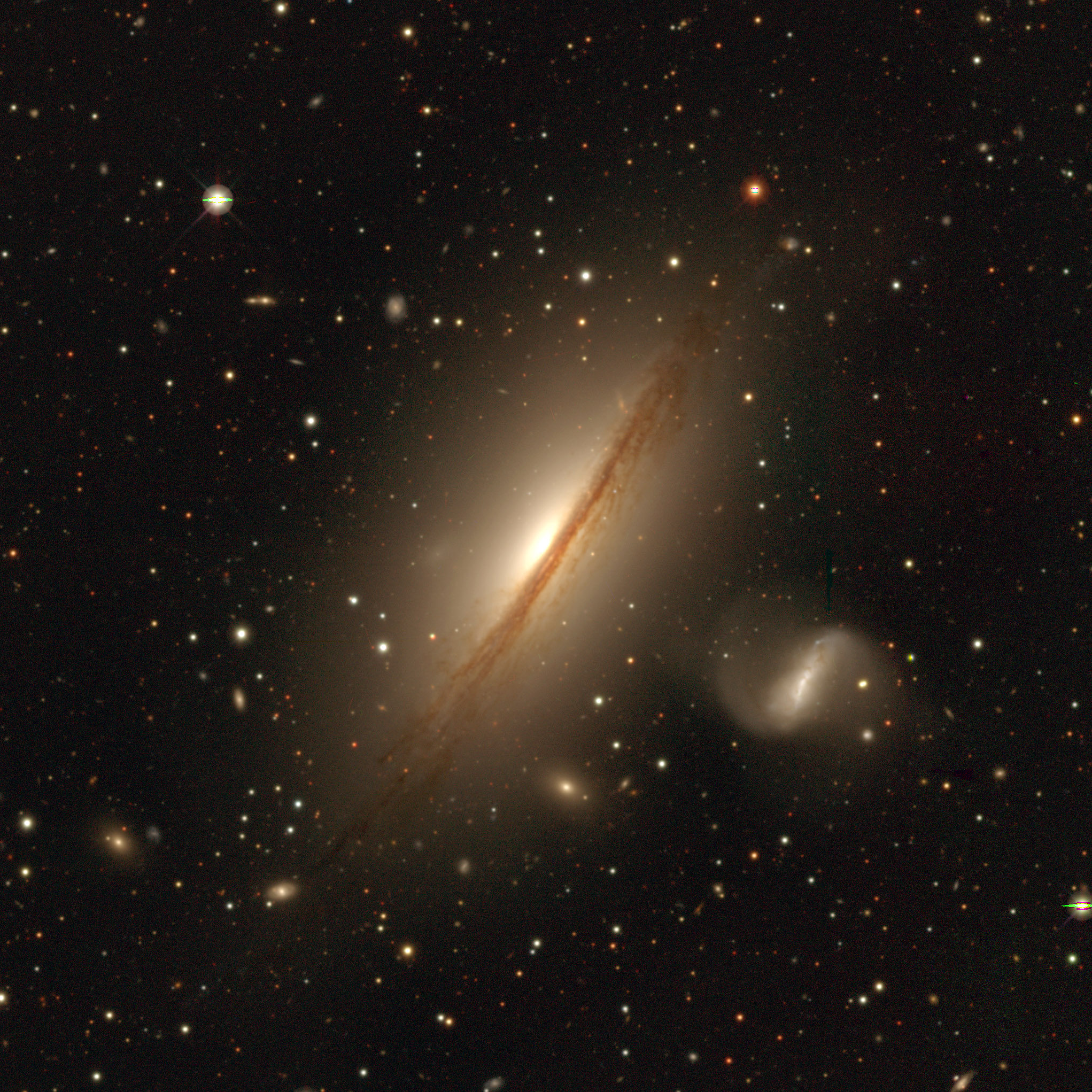
- Legacy surveys image of NGC 5078 and IC 879

Observation data (J2000 epoch)
- Constellation: Hydra
- Right ascension: 13^{h} 19^{m} 50.0110^{s}
- Declination: −27° 24′ 37.015″
- Redshift: 2168 ± 6 km/s
- Distance: 94 Mly
- Group or cluster: NGC 5061 group (LGG 341)
- Apparent magnitude (V): +11.8

Characteristics
- Type: SA(s)a
- Apparent size (V): 4′.0 × 1′.9

Other designations
- ESO 508- G 048, IRAS 13170-2708, MCG -04-32-001, PGC 46490

NGC 5078 is a spiral galaxy in the constellation Hydra, approximately 94 million light-years away from Earth. It has a diameter of 127,000 light-years. It was discovered by German-British astronomer William Herschel on 28 March 1786.

The dust lane of NGC 5078 is warped, probably by interaction with the nearby galaxy IC 879, which is itself distorted into an 'S' shape by the interaction. At the presumed distance the two galaxies would have a minimal separation of about 61,000 light-years. For comparison, the Large Magellanic Cloud is about 160,000 light-years from the Milky Way.

NGC 5078 is also only separated in the sky from the spiral galaxy NGC 5101 by about 0.5 degrees, and both are believed to be at the same distance from the Earth. This would mean they are approximately 800,000 light-years apart.

== NGC 5061 group ==
NGC 5078 is a member of a NGC 5061 group (also known as LGG 341). The group contains 10 galaxies, including NGC 5061, NGC 5085, NGC 5101, IC 874, IC 4222, IC 4231, and three galaxies from the ESO catalogue.

== Supernova ==
One supernova has been observed in NGC 5078: SN 1999cz (Type Ic, mag. 16) was discovered by the Perth Astronomical Research Group on 12 June 1999.
