= NGC 5101 =

Lenticular galaxy in the constellation Hydra

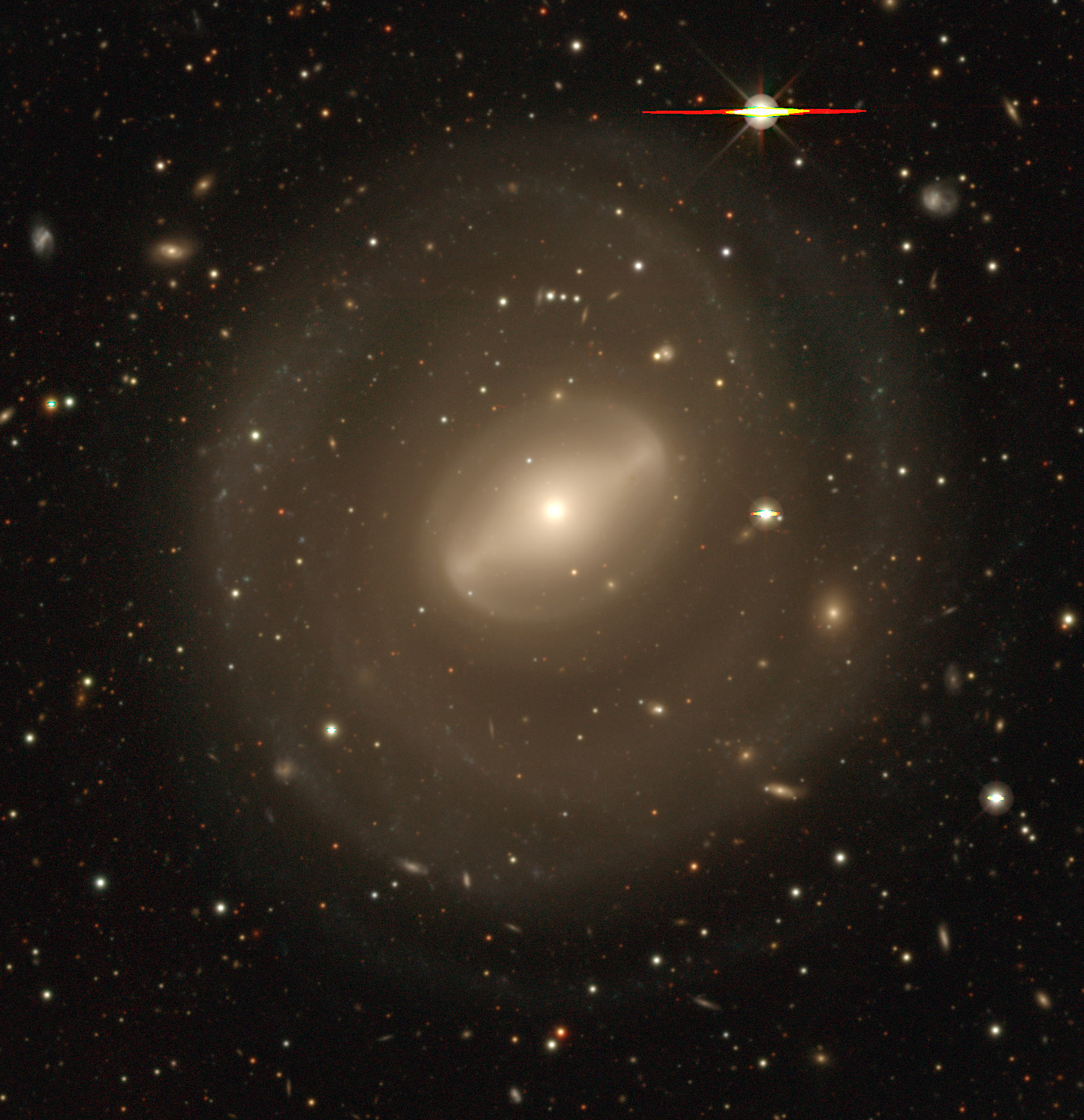
- NGC 5101 with legacy surveys

Observation data (J2000 epoch)
- Constellation: Hydra
- Right ascension: 13^{h} 21^{m} 46.2^{s}
- Declination: −27° 25′ 50″
- Redshift: 0.006231
- Heliocentric radial velocity: 1868 ± 3 km/s
- Distance: 89 Mly (27.4 Mpc)
- Group or cluster: NGC 5061 group (LGG 341)
- Apparent magnitude (V): 11.6

Characteristics
- Type: (R)SB0/a(rs)
- Size: ~150,000 ly (45.91 kpc) (estimated)
- Apparent size (V): 5.4′ × 4.6′

Other designations
- ESO 508- G 058, AM 1319-271, IRAS 13190-2709, UGCA 351, MCG -04-32-008, PGC 46661

NGC 5101 is a lenticular galaxy in the constellation Hydra. It was discovered by German-British astronomer William Herschel on 28 March 1786.

NGC 5101 is separated in the sky from the spiral galaxy NGC 5078 by about 0.5 degrees, and both are believed to be at the same distance from the Earth. This would mean they are approximately 800,000 light-years apart. Both galaxies are believed to be about the size of the Milky Way.

== NGC 5061 group ==
NGC 5101 is a member of the NGC 5061 group (also known as LGG 341). It contains 10 galaxies, including NGC 5061, NGC 5078, NGC 5085, IC 874, IC 4222, IC 4231, and three galaxies from the ESO catalogue.

== Supernova ==
One supernova has been observed in NGC 5101: SN 1986B (Type I, mag. 17) was discovered by Bruno Leibundgut and L. Cameron on 13 February 1986.
