= NGC 6782 =

Galaxy in the constellation Pavo

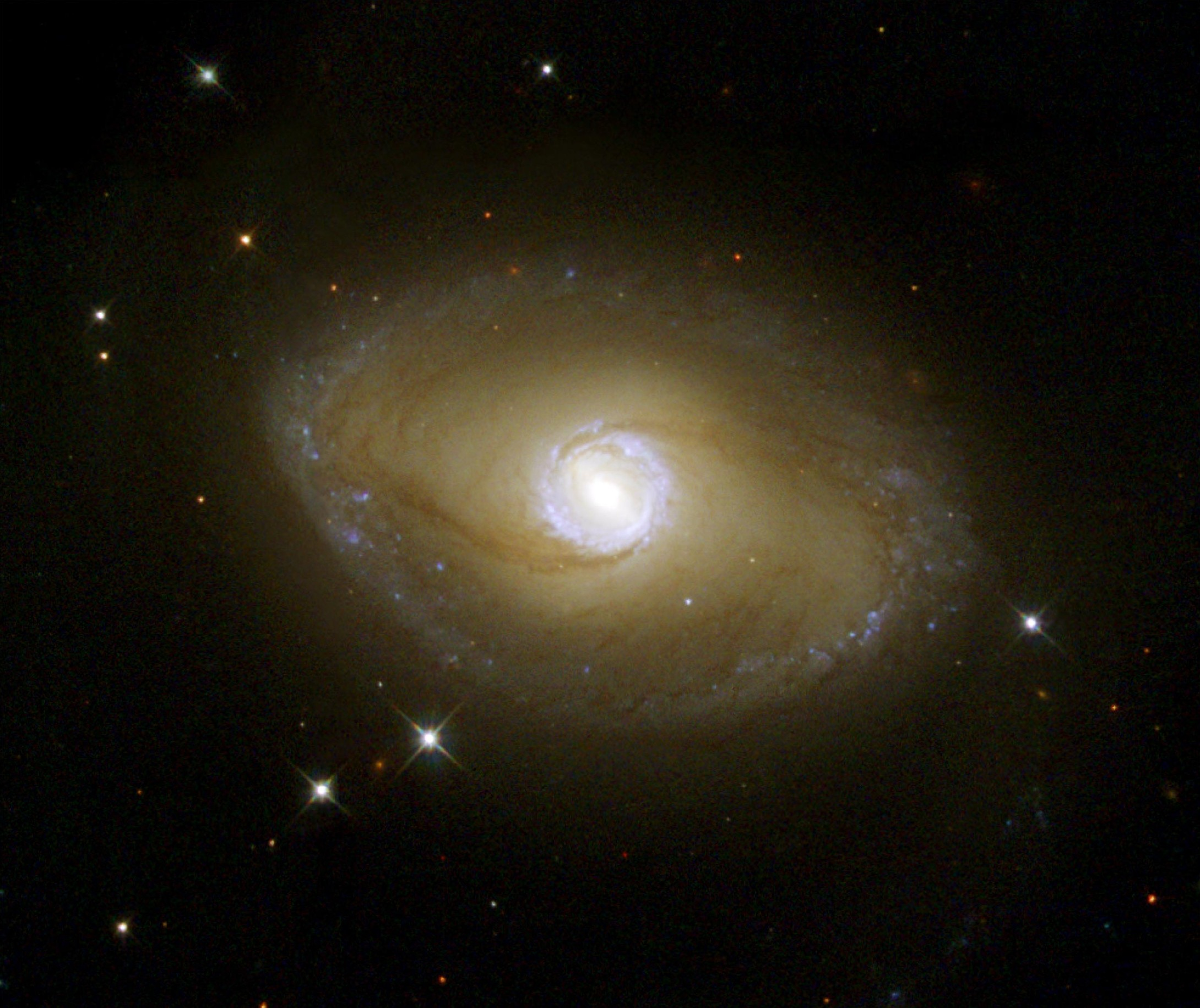
- NGC 6782 imaged by the Hubble Space Telescope

Observation data (J2000 epoch)
- Constellation: Pavo
- Right ascension: 19^{h} 23^{m} 57.935^{s}
- Declination: −59° 55′ 21.04″
- Redshift: 0.012462±0.000123
- Heliocentric radial velocity: 3,736 km/s
- Distance: 173 Mly (53 Mpc)
- Apparent magnitude (V): 11.8

Characteristics
- Type: (R_{1}R′_{2})SB(r)a
- Apparent size (V): 1′.197 × 0′.814 (NIR)

Other designations
- LEDA 63168, ESO 142-1, 2MASX J19235793-5955210, NGC 6782, PGC 63168

NGC 6782 is a barred spiral galaxy located in the southern constellation of Pavo, at a distance of approximately 173 megalight-years from the Milky Way. It was discovered on July 12, 1834 by English astronomer John Herschel. John L. E. Dreyer described it as, "considerably faint, considerably small, round, a little brighter middle, 9th magnitude star to south". The morphological classification of NGC 6782 is (R_{1}R′_{2})SB(r)a, indicating a barred spiral galaxy with a multiple ring system and tightly-wound spiral arms. It is seen nearly face-on, being inclined by an angle of 27.2°±0.2° to the line of sight from the Earth.

At the galactic core is an almost circular nuclear ring at the inner Lindblad resonance. This is attached to the primary bar, which extends out to a somewhat pointy, diamond-shaped inner ring. It is actually a double-barred galaxy, with an interior bar inside the nuclear ring. A pair of faint spiral arms extend out from the inner ring to the outer parts of the galaxy, where it joints a double outer ring system. Both inner rings of the galaxy are undergoing star formation, producing hot OB stars, with little star formation occurring in the remainder.

== IC 4845 group ==
NGC 6782 is a member of the IC 4845 galaxy group (also known as LGG 427), which contains 14 members, including NGC 6739, NGC 6746, NGC 6769, NGC 6770, IC 4827, IC 4828, IC 4831, IC 4838, IC 4842, IC 4845, IC 4866, and ESO 141-21.

== Gallery ==
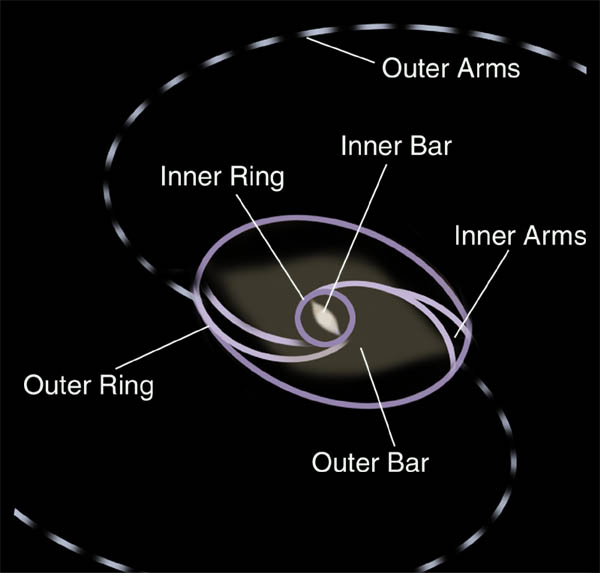
Structure of NGC 6782

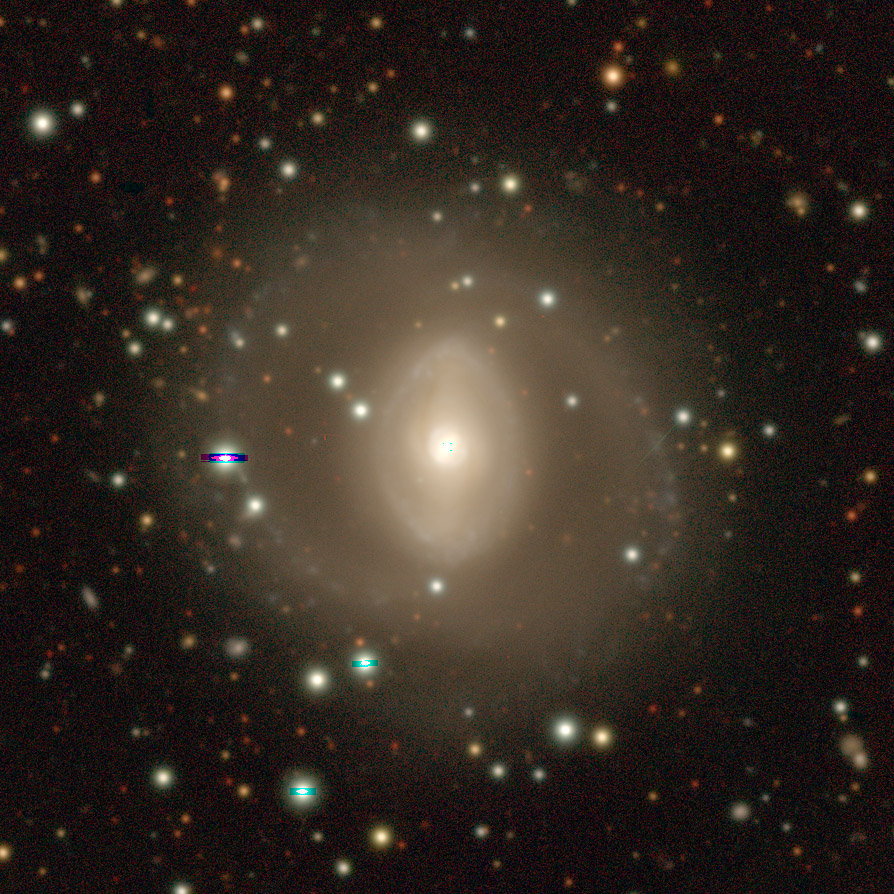
NGC 6782 with legacy survey

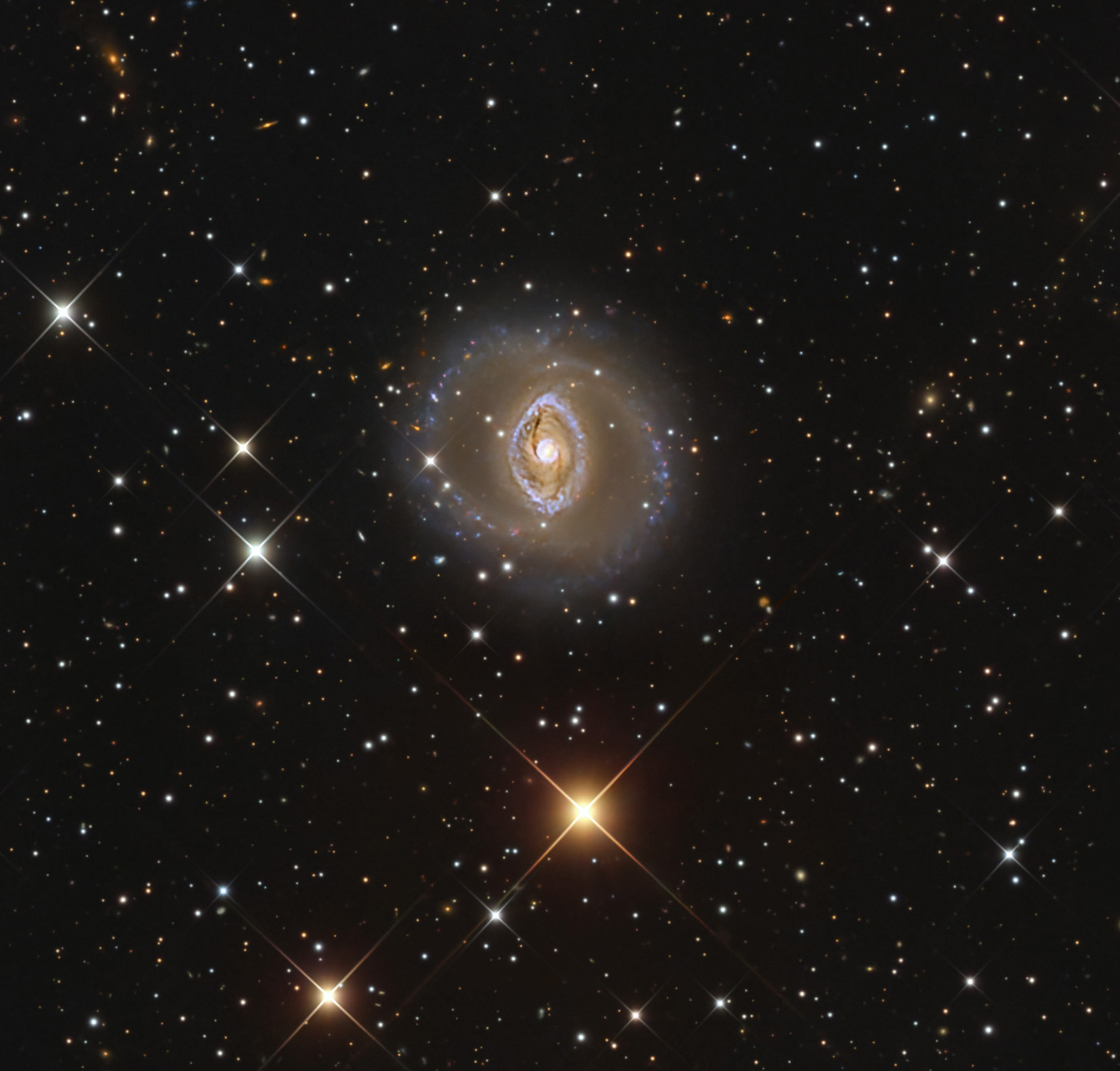
NGC 6782 Barred Spiral Galaxy (Full Color)

== See also ==
- Messier 94 - a similar spiral galaxy
