= Christopher Conselice =

American astronomer

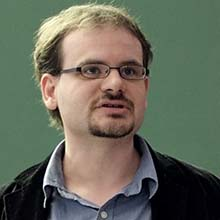
- Born: Jacksonville FL
- Education: University of Chicago; University of Wisconsin-Madison
- Known for: Galaxy Formation and Evolution, Galaxy Classification
- Awards: Leverhulme Prize
- Scientific career
- Workplaces: Space Telescope Science Institute; California Institute of Technology; University of Nottingham; University of Manchester
- Doctoral advisor: John S. Gallagher III
- Website: https://www.nottingham.ac.uk/~ppzcc1/

Christopher J. Conselice is an astrophysicist who is Professor of Extragalactic Astronomy at the University of Manchester.

== Background ==
Conselice grew up in Neptune Beach, Florida and graduated from Stanton College Preparatory School. Conselice received his bachelor's degree in physics from the University of Chicago in 1996 and his PhD in astronomy from the University of Wisconsin–Madison in 2001 where he was a student of John S. Gallagher. He was a post-doctoral fellow at the Space Telescope Science Institute and later a National Science Foundation Fellow at the California Institute of Technology where he led the Palomar Observatory Wide-Field Infrared Survey (POWIR). He obtained a faculty position at the University of Nottingham in 2005. He became Professor of Extragalactic Astronomy at the University of Manchester in 2020.

== Research ==
Conselice specializes in the formation and evolution of galaxies and their structural parameters - the so-called CAS parameters (concentration C, asymmetry A, and clumpiness S). His major contributions have involved new classification systems for galaxies as well as the understanding of early galaxy formation and the formation of low mass galaxies. He has since led major infrared surveys using ground-based telescopes such as the Palomar Observatory, UKIRT and the Hubble Space Telescope. He has taken a leading role in many of the largest Hubble Space Telescope and ground based imaging surveys, including the Hubble Deep Field and GOODS survey.

Conselice is the Principal Investigator on the HST GOODS NICMOS Survey, which utilises 180 orbits of the Hubble Space Telescope to image over 8000 galaxies in the near infrared. This is currently the largest allocation of HST time awarded to an investigator operating outside of the United States.

In 2008 Thompson Scientific declared Conselice as the most cited young Space Scientist in the world during the years 1997–2007.

In 2009, Conselice was awarded the Philip Leverhulme Prize in Astronomy & Astrophysics, and was part of the UKIDSS survey in the UK that won the Royal Astronomical Society's 2012 Group Achievement Award.

Since 2015 he has been a member of the Euclid Science Coordination Group, leading aspects of the missions Legacy (non-cosmological) Science.

=== Galaxy formation and evolution ===
Conselice has been one of the pioneers in using the fact that the speed of light is constant to determine how galaxy evolution has occurred. With this assumption more distant galaxies appear as they did billions of years ago. His work has shown the role of merging in forming galaxies over cosmic time, finding that when the universe was a few billion years old a large fraction, up to 40% of galaxies, are undergoing a merger. This was later found to contribute a significant amount to the build up of galaxy mass over the history of the universe.

=== Number of galaxies in the Universe ===
Conselice led a team in 2016 which showed that the number of galaxies in the universe was 2 trillion. This was roughly 10 times higher than previous estimates of 100-200 billion. This was carried out using deep Hubble Space Telescope observations of the deepest imaging surveys ever taken with the Hubble Space Telescope. This news story was the 6th most popular story in physical sciences in 2016. This result has implications for galaxy evolution as well as insights into the Olbers Paradox and the amount of background light in the universe.

=== Intelligent life in our galaxy ===
Conselice working with student Tom Westby developed a new methodology for calculating the number of possible communicating intelligent extraterrestrial civilizations there could be in our galaxy. This method was a major update to the Drake equation using the assumption that life and intelligent life form on other planets in the same way as it did on earth. This idea expands on the principles of Convergent evolution. Specifically, five billion years of uninterrupted evolution is needed. If these Communicating Extraterreestial Intelligent (CETI) civilizations can survive as such for on average of 100 years without destruction, similar to the current life-span of earth's communicating intelligence, then there should be $36^{+175}_{-34}$ actively communicating civilizations within our Galaxy. This assumption is called the Astrobiological Copernican Principle.

== Outreach and editorial work ==
Conselice was the "Research Notebook" columnist for the Astronomical Society of the Pacific's Mercury Magazine from 1999 to 2003. He has also written for other popular astronomy magazines such as Scientific American, Discovery, and Astronomy, as well as having published over 200 articles in refereed scientific journals. He has partaken in the I'm a Scientist, Get me out of Here! program in the UK, interacting with school-age children to describe and answer questions about science.

Conselice's 2007 Scientific American article, "The Universe's Invisible Hand" appeared in the 2008 edition of "The Best American Science and Nature Writing." In 2014, Conselice published his first book about the discovery of galaxies, 'Galactic Encounters', with William Sheehan.

Since 2010 he has been a Scientific Editor for the Astrophysical Journal and since 2018 the Lead Editor of the Galaxies and Cosmology corridor for the American Astronomical Society (AAS) Journals.
