= NGC 1961 =

Galaxy in the constellation Camelopardalis

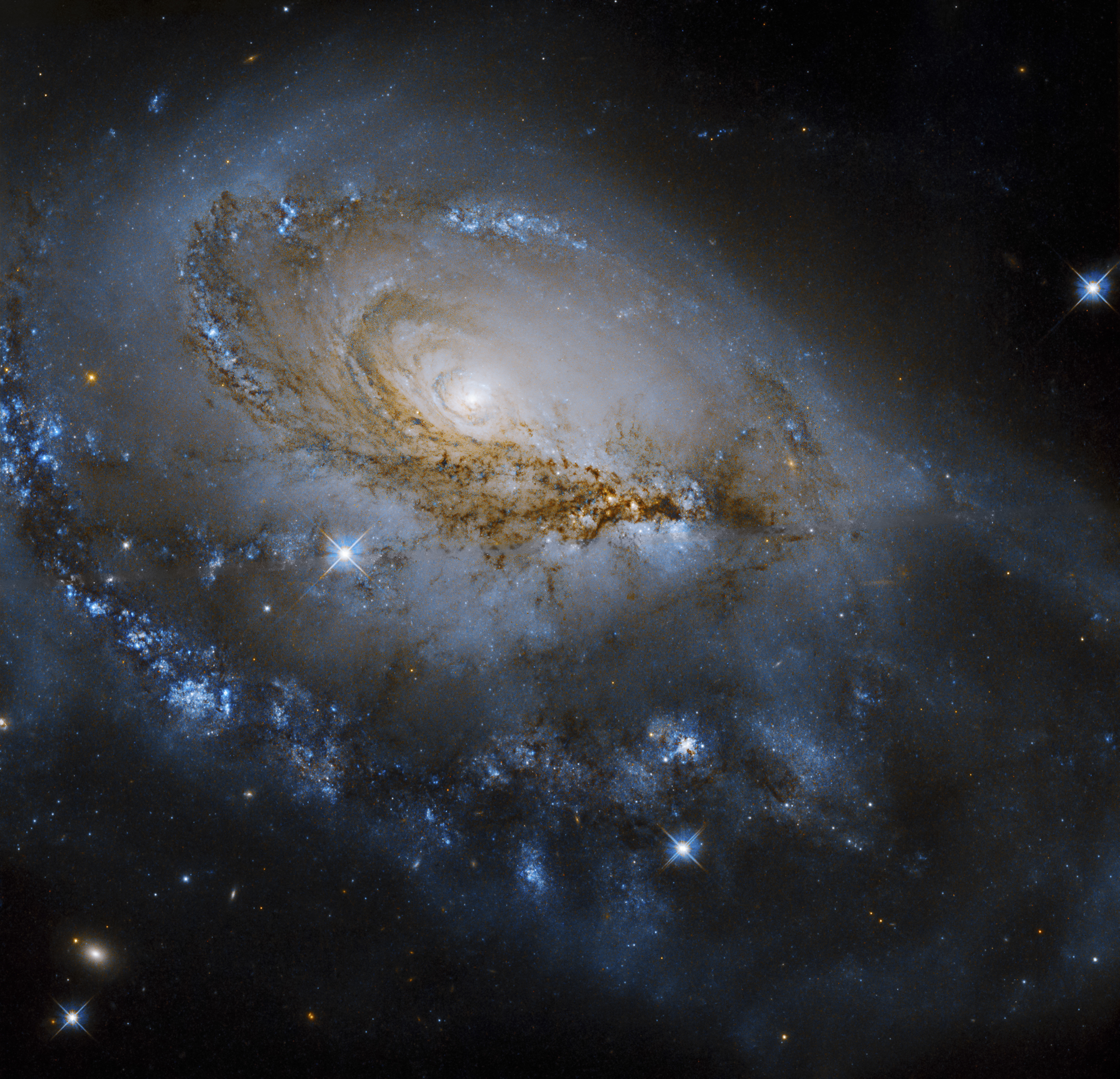
- NGC 1961 imaged by the Hubble Space Telescope

Observation data (J2000 epoch)
- Constellation: Camelopardalis
- Right ascension: 05^{h} 42^{m} 04.6477^{s}
- Declination: +69° 22′ 42.375″
- Redshift: 0.013122
- Heliocentric radial velocity: 3,934±1 km/s
- Distance: 145.42 ± 27.36 Mly (44.586 ± 8.390 Mpc)
- Apparent magnitude (V): 10.9

Characteristics
- Type: SAB(rs)c
- Size: ~240,100 ly (73.62 kpc) (estimated)
- Apparent size (V): 4.5′ × 3.1′

Other designations
- IRAS 05365+6921, IC 2133, Arp 184, UGC 3334, MCG +12-06-007, PGC 17625, CGCG 329-008

NGC 1961 is a spiral galaxy in the constellation Camelopardalis. It was discovered by German-British astronomer William Herschel on 3 December 1788. It was also observed by Guillaume Bigourdan on 22 December 1891, causing it to be listed in the Index Catalogue as IC 2133. Its velocity with respect to the cosmic microwave background for is 3,909±2 km/s, which corresponds to a Hubble distance of 188.0 ± 13.2 Mly (57.65 ± 4.04 Mpc). However, seven non redshift measurements give a much closer distance of 145.42 ± 27.36 Mly (44.586 ± 8.390 Mpc).

The galaxy has been distorted, however no companion has been detected nor double nuclei that could show a recent merger. Its outer arms are highly irregular. Two long straight arms extend from the north side of the galaxy. A luminous X-ray corona has been detected around the galaxy. NGC 1961 is the central member of the small group of nine galaxies, the NGC 1961 group.

== Supernovae ==
Four supernovae have been observed in NGC 1961:

- SN 1998eb (Type Ia, mag. 17.8) was discovered by the Lick Observatory Supernova Search (LOSS) on 17 August 1998.
- SN 2001is (Type Ib, mag. 17.6) was discovered by BAO and LOTOSS (Lick Observatory and Tenagra Observatory Supernova Searches) on 22 December 2001.
- SN 2013cc (Type II, mag. 17) was discovered by Kōichi Itagaki on 28 April 2013.
- SN 2021vaz (Type II, mag. 17.5) was discovered by Kōichi Itagaki on 5 August 2021.

== Gallery ==
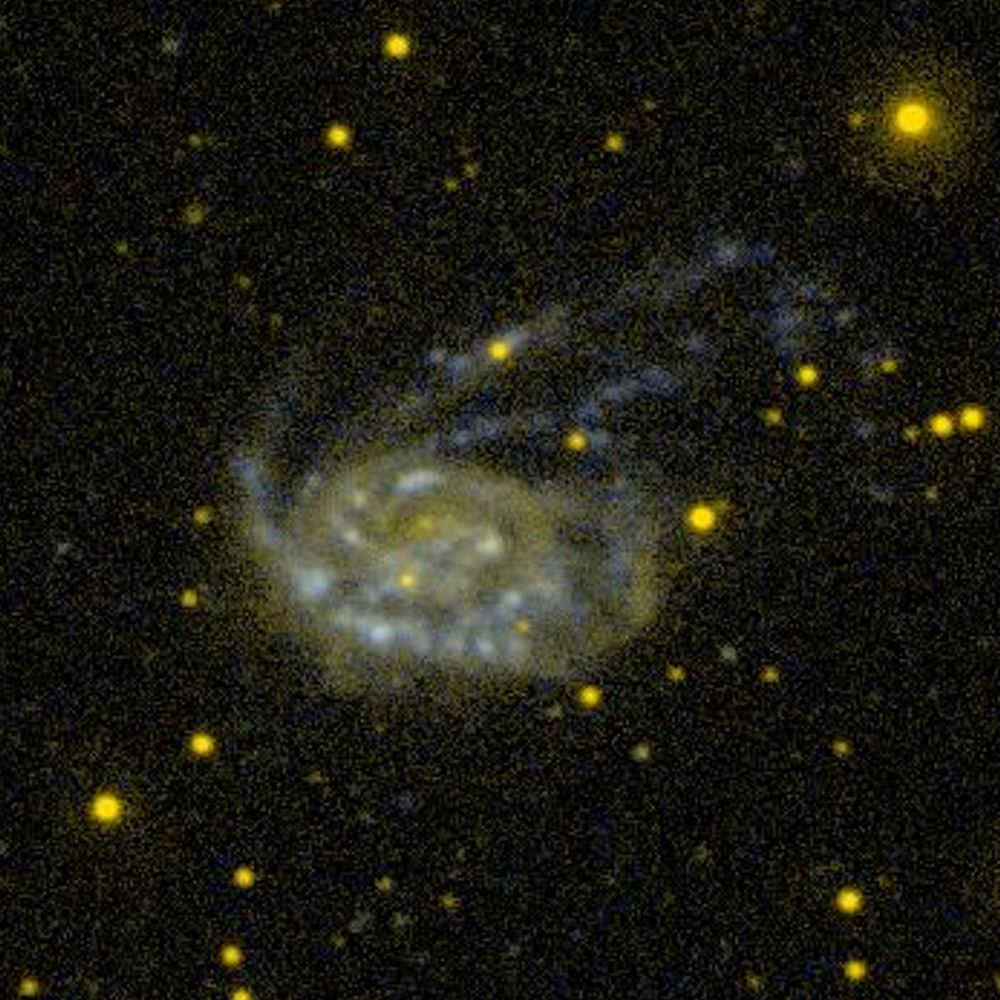
NGC 1961 by GALEX

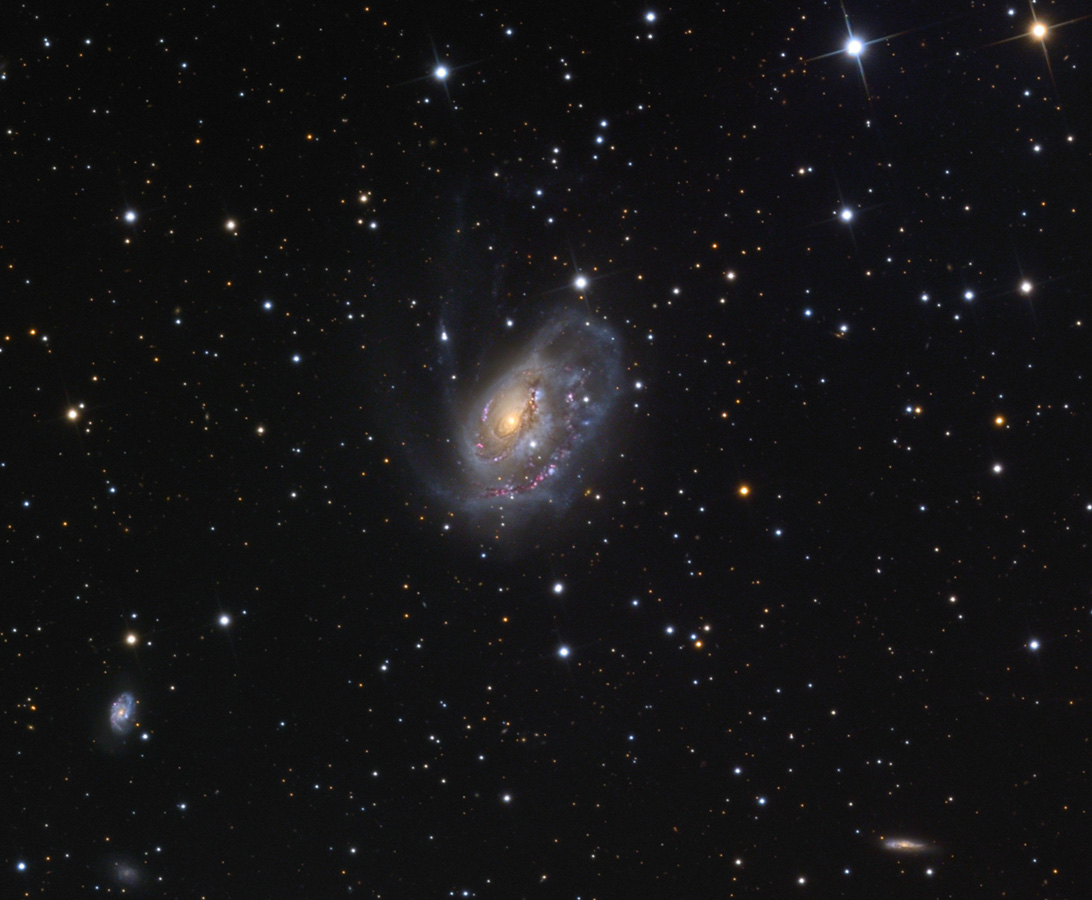
NGC 1961 by Mount Lemmon Observatory

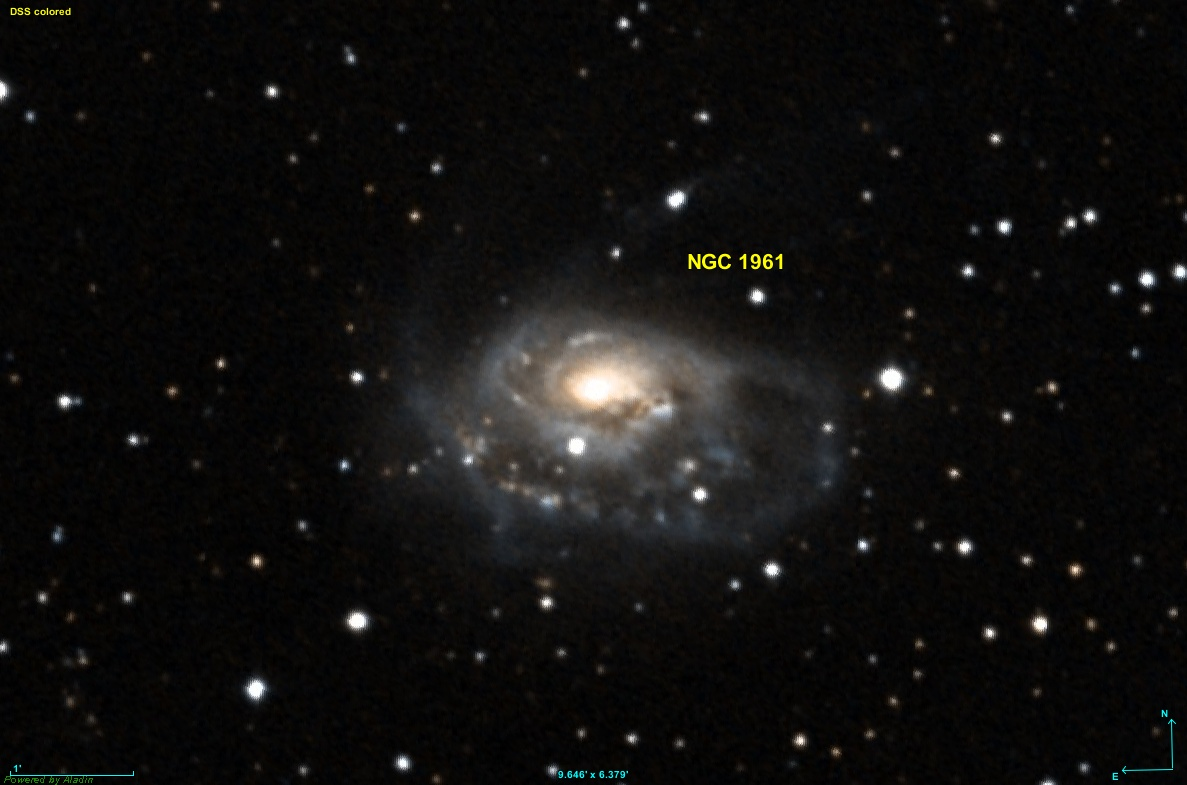
NGC 1961 by DSS

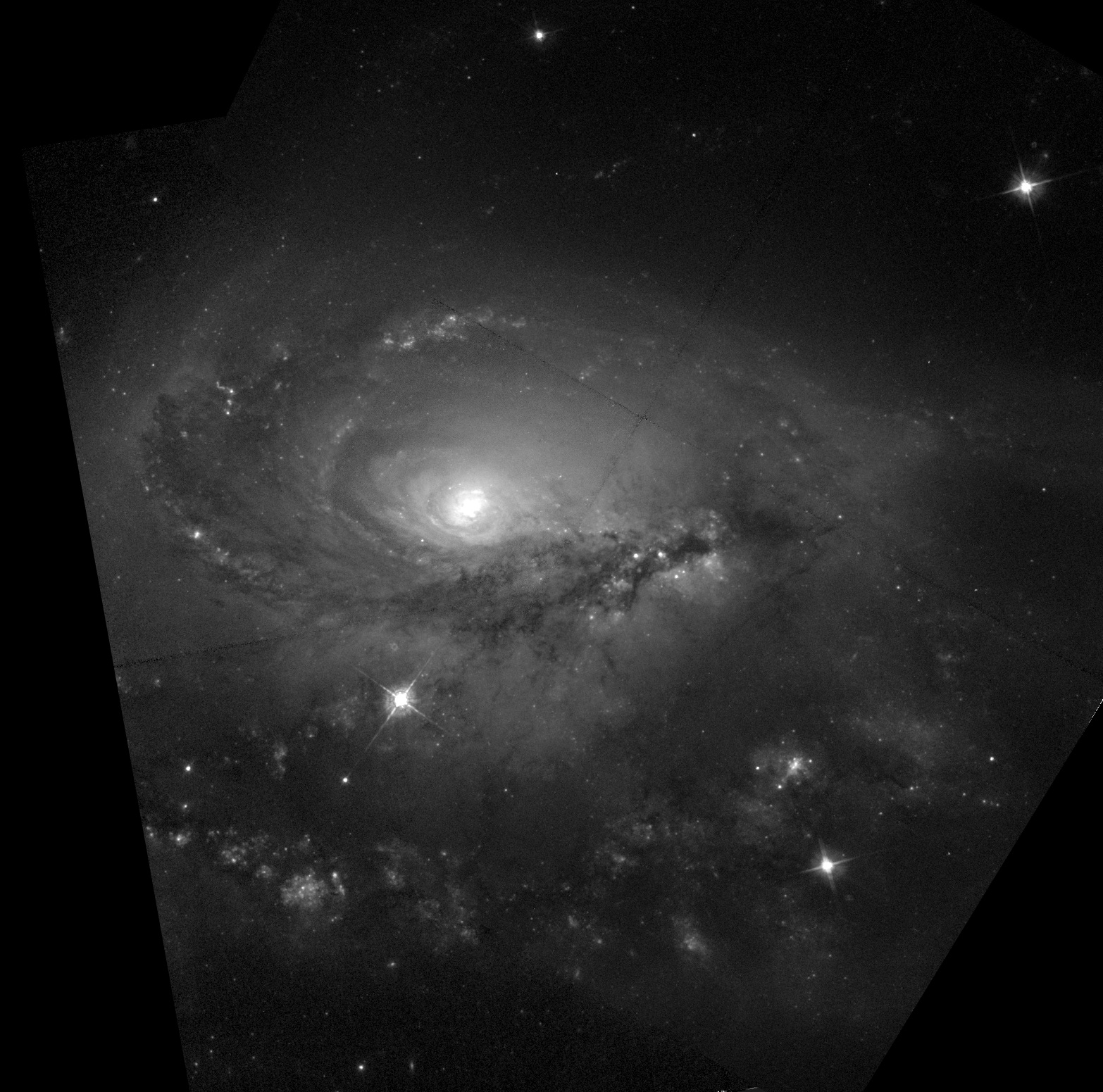
NGC 1961 by Hubble Space Telescope
