= UGC 12591 =

Spiral Galaxy in Pegasus

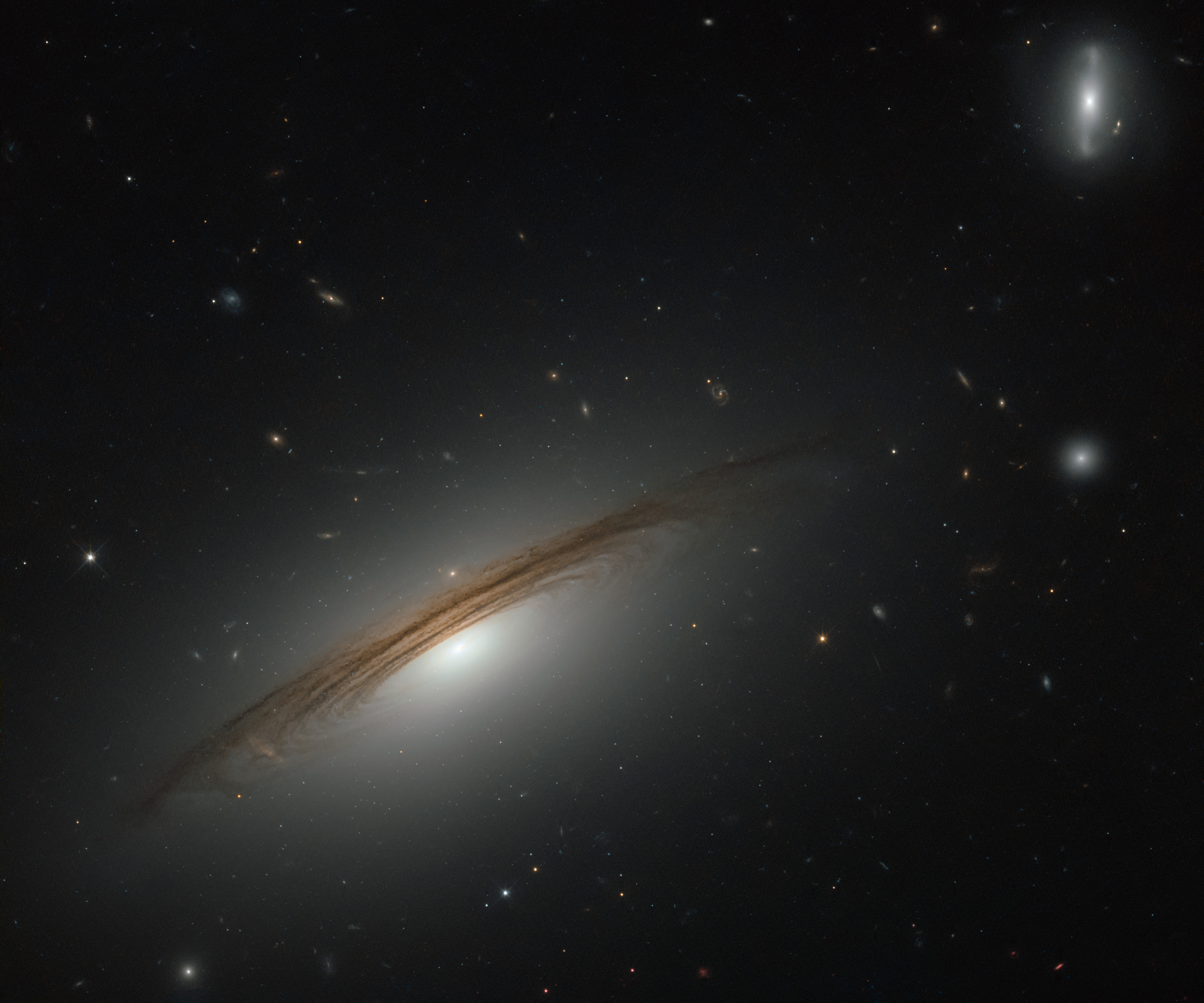
- UGC 12591 imaged by the Hubble Space Telescope

Observation data (J2000 epoch)
- Constellation: Pegasus
- Right ascension: 23^{h} 25^{m} 21.7979^{s}
- Declination: +28° 29′ 43.281″
- Redshift: 0.023166
- Heliocentric radial velocity: 6945 ± 3
- Distance: 394.26 ± 59.86 Mly (120.880 ± 18.352 Mpc)
- Apparent magnitude (B): 13.90

Characteristics
- Type: S0/a
- Mass: 1.9×10^{12} M_{☉}
- Size: ~273,300 ly (83.80 kpc) (estimated)
- Apparent size (V): 1.7′ × 0.7′

Other designations
- MCG +05-55-015, PGC 71392, CGCG 497-015

UGC 12591 is a spiral galaxy in the constellation Pegasus. Its velocity with respect to the cosmic microwave background is 6,600±24 km/s, which corresponds to a Hubble distance of 317.5 ± 22.2 Mly (97.35 ± 6.82 Mpc). However, five non-redshift measurements give a farther mean distance of 394.26 ± 59.86 Mly (120.880 ± 18.352 Mpc). The first known reference to this galaxy comes from Part 2 of the Morphological Catalogue of Galaxies, published in 1964, where it is listed as MCG +05-55-015.

UGC 12591 is the spiral galaxy with the highest known rotational speed of about 500 km/s, almost twice that of the Milky Way galaxy. The high rotational speed means the galaxy must be very massive at the center; the galaxy has a mass estimated at 4 times that of the Milky Way.

UGC 12591 is relatively isolated; the nearest galaxy to it, WISEA J232529.77+283021.3, is 3.55 million light-years (1.09 Mpc) away. However, its morphology suggests a merger or accretion event in its past: it is somewhat lenticular-like, with a central bulge and dust lanes reminiscent of the Sombrero Galaxy.
