= CAS parameters =

The CAS (concentration, asymmetry, smoothness) parameters are a tool originally developed in astronomy to characterize the shapes and images of objects with some central concentration. Each parameter is a single number which represents some aspect of the structure of the object under study. These parameters were originally developed by astronomers to quantify the light distribution of galaxies, as a way to avoid having to use visual estimates of galaxy morphological classification. They have also been used in biological imaging, and other areas of imaging analysis. Each parameter is measured in a well defined way and within a well defined radius.

== Asymmetry (A) ==
The asymmetry index is a measure of how symmetric an object is. It is defined by rotating and subtracting an image by 180 deg from its center. This parameter has been used in astronomy to determine galaxy mergers and its history. The asymmetry is a measure of skewness in terms of the 2-dimensional distribution of light.

== Concentration (C) ==
The concentration index is used to measure how concentrated the light is within the object under study. It is an analog of the mean for a spatial distribution in two dimensions. It is usually measured at the radii of the image under studied which contains 80% and 20% of the light. Other methods are used, such as the fraction of light within set radii.

== Smoothness (S) ==
The smoothness (also called clumpiness) is a measure of the fraction of light in an object which is in small scale structures. It is an analog of the standard deviation for a 2-dimensional image. In astronomy galaxies which are elliptical have a low smoothness as there is little in the way of small scale structure within these types of galaxies.
