= Galaxy morphological classification =

System for categorizing galaxies based on appearance

Tuning-fork-style diagram of the Hubble sequence

Galaxy morphological classification is a system used by astronomers to divide galaxies into groups based on their visual appearance, shape, structure, and distribution of light. There are several schemes in use by which galaxies can be classified according to their morphologies, the most famous being the Hubble sequence, devised by Edwin Hubble and later expanded by Gérard de Vaucouleurs and Allan Sandage. However, galaxy classification and morphology are now largely done using computational methods and physical morphology.

== Hubble sequence ==
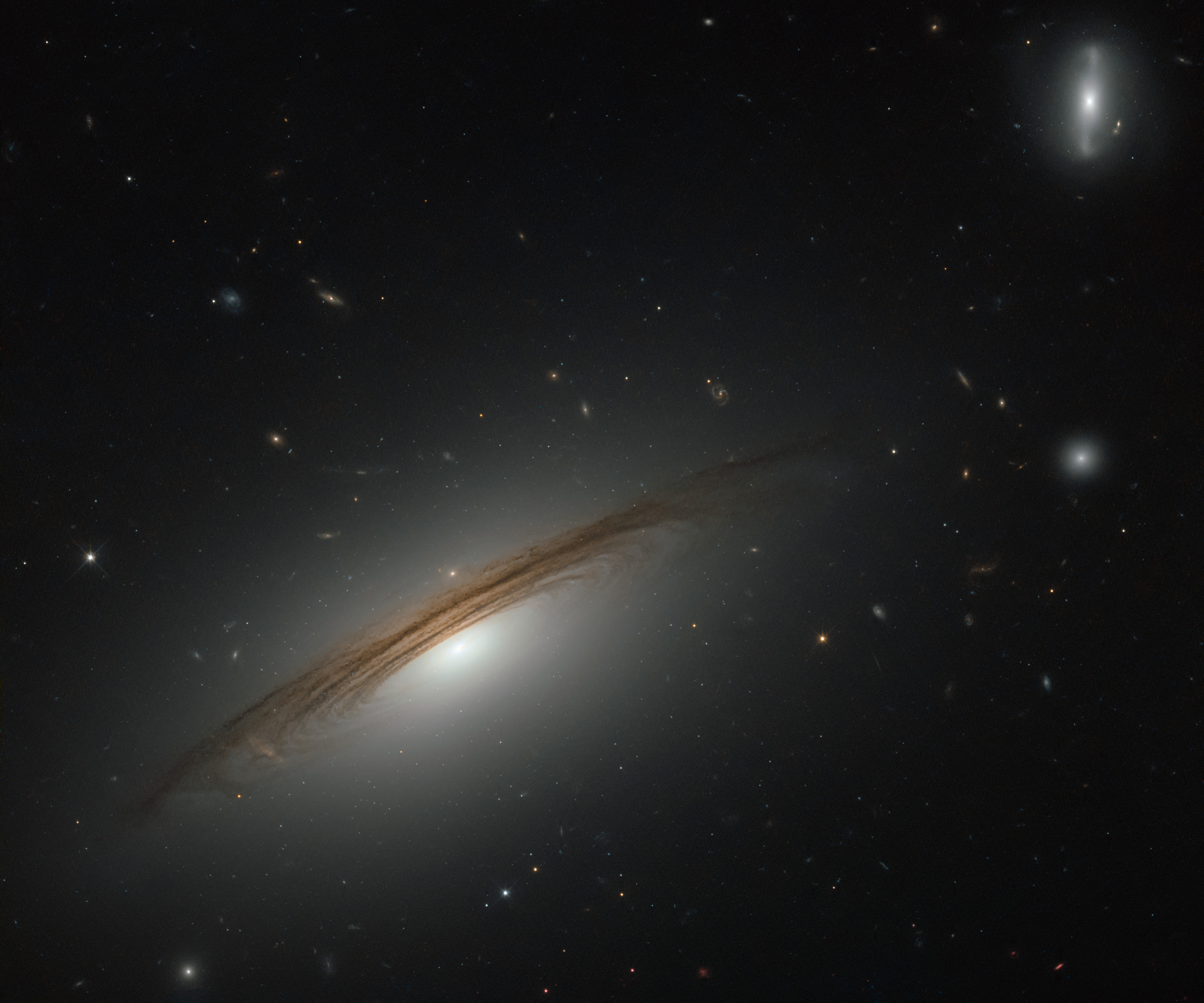
Spiral galaxy UGC 12591 is classified as an S0/Sa galaxy.

The Hubble sequence is a morphological classification scheme for galaxies invented by Edwin Hubble in 1926. It is often known colloquially as the "Hubble tuning-fork" because of the shape in which it is traditionally represented. Hubble's scheme divides galaxies into three broad classes based on their visual appearance (originally on photographic plates):

- Elliptical galaxies have smooth, featureless light distributions and appear as ellipses in images. They are denoted by the letter "E", followed by an integer n representing their degree of ellipticity on the sky. The specific ellipticity rating depends on ratio of the major (a) to minor axes (b), thus:

$$E = 10 \times \left( 1-\frac{b}{a} \right)$$

- Spiral galaxies consist of a flattened disk, with stars forming a (usually two-armed) spiral structure, and a central concentration of stars known as the bulge, which is similar in appearance to an elliptical galaxy. They are given the symbol "S". Roughly half of all spirals are also observed to have a bar-like structure, extending from the central bulge. These barred spirals are given the symbol "SB".
- Lenticular galaxies (designated S0) also consist of a bright central bulge surrounded by an extended, disk-like structure but, unlike spiral galaxies, the disks of lenticular galaxies have no visible spiral structure and are not actively forming stars in any significant quantity.

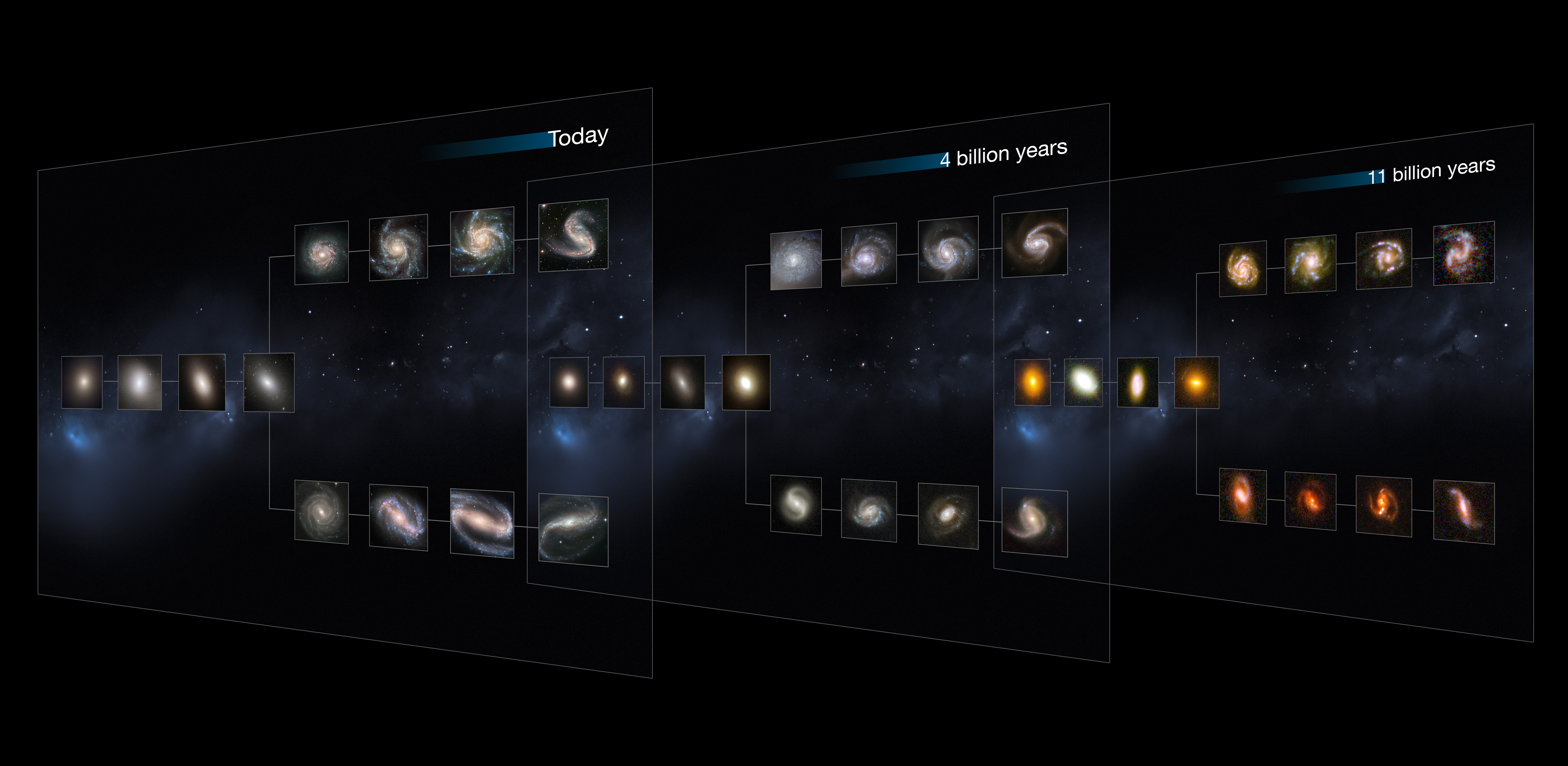
The Hubble sequence throughout the universe's history

These broad classes can be extended to enable finer distinctions of appearance and to encompass other types of galaxies, such as irregular galaxies, which have no obvious regular structure (either disk-like or ellipsoidal).

The Hubble sequence is often represented in the form of a two-pronged fork, with the ellipticals on the left (with the degree of ellipticity increasing from left to right) and the barred and unbarred spirals forming the two parallel prongs of the fork on the right. Lenticular galaxies are placed between the ellipticals and the spirals, at the point where the two prongs meet the "handle".

To this day, the Hubble sequence is the most commonly used system for classifying galaxies, both in professional astronomical research and in amateur astronomy. Nonetheless, in June 2019, citizen scientists through Galaxy Zoo reported that the usual Hubble classification, particularly concerning the relationship between spiral arms and galactic nucleus in spiral galaxies, may need reassessment.

== De Vaucouleurs system ==
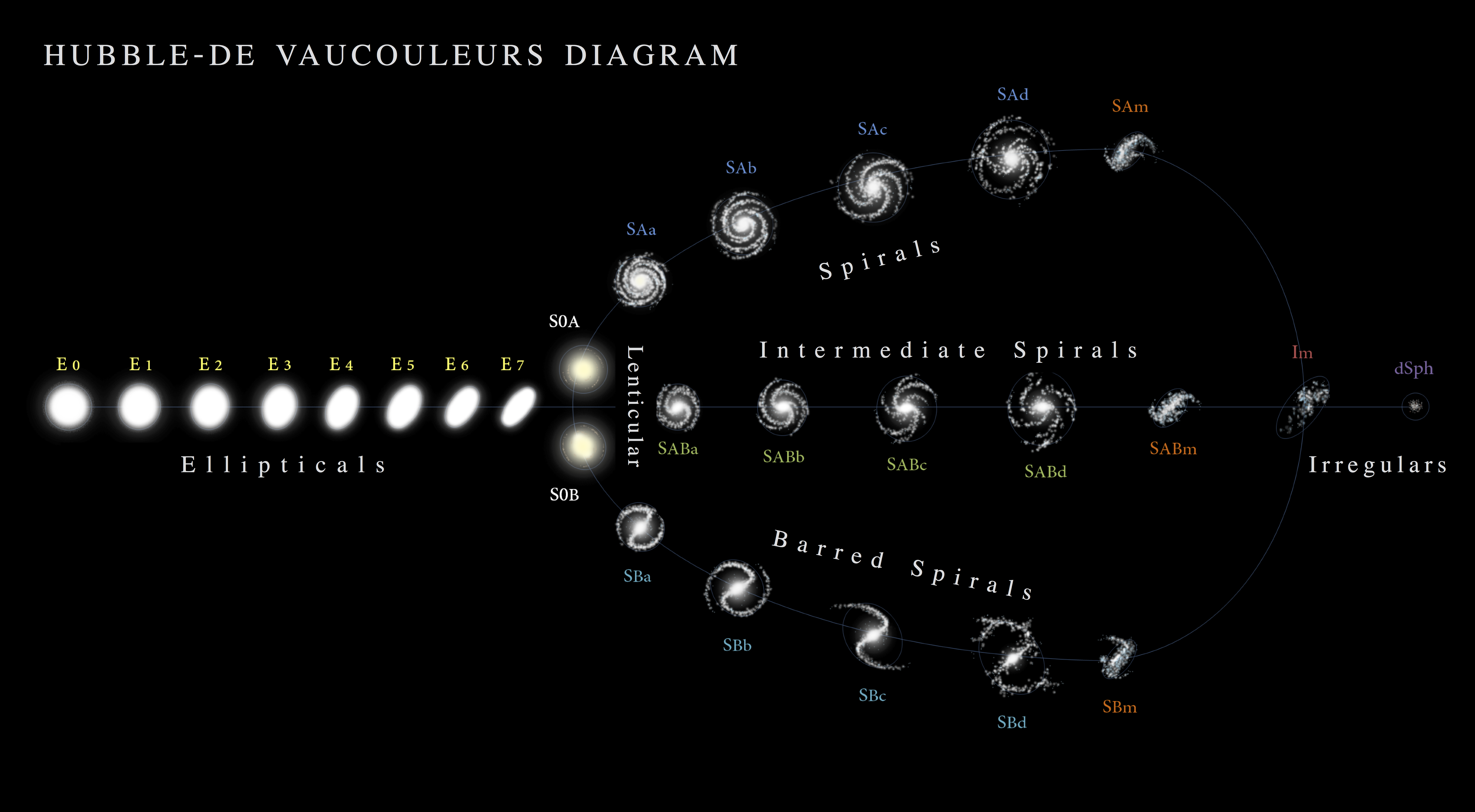
Hubble – de Vaucouleurs Galaxy Morphology Diagram

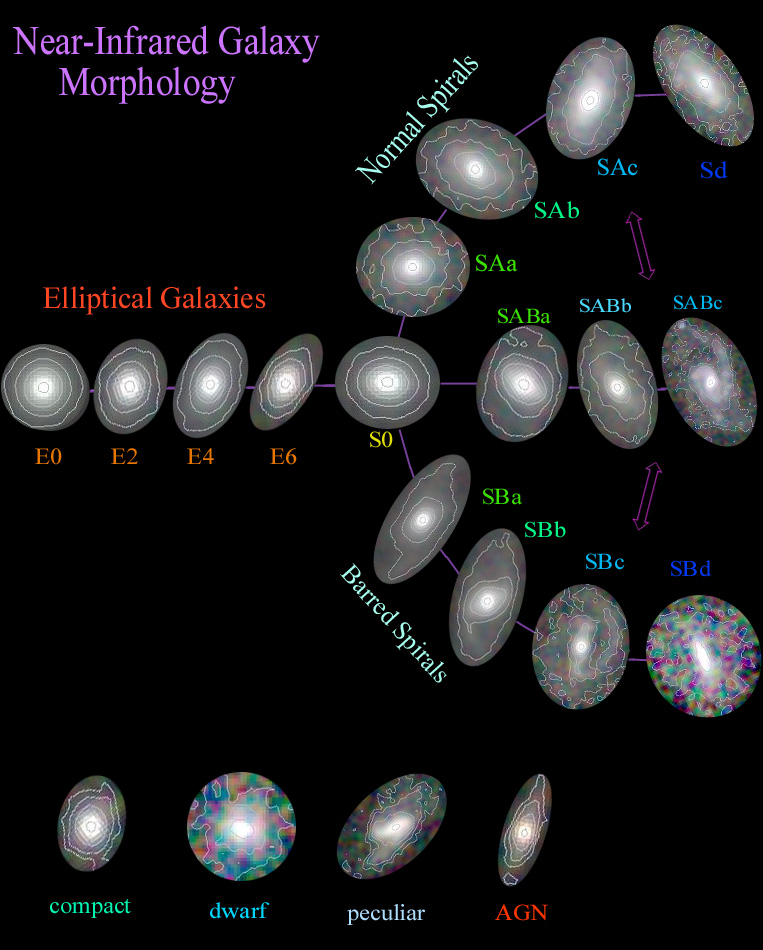

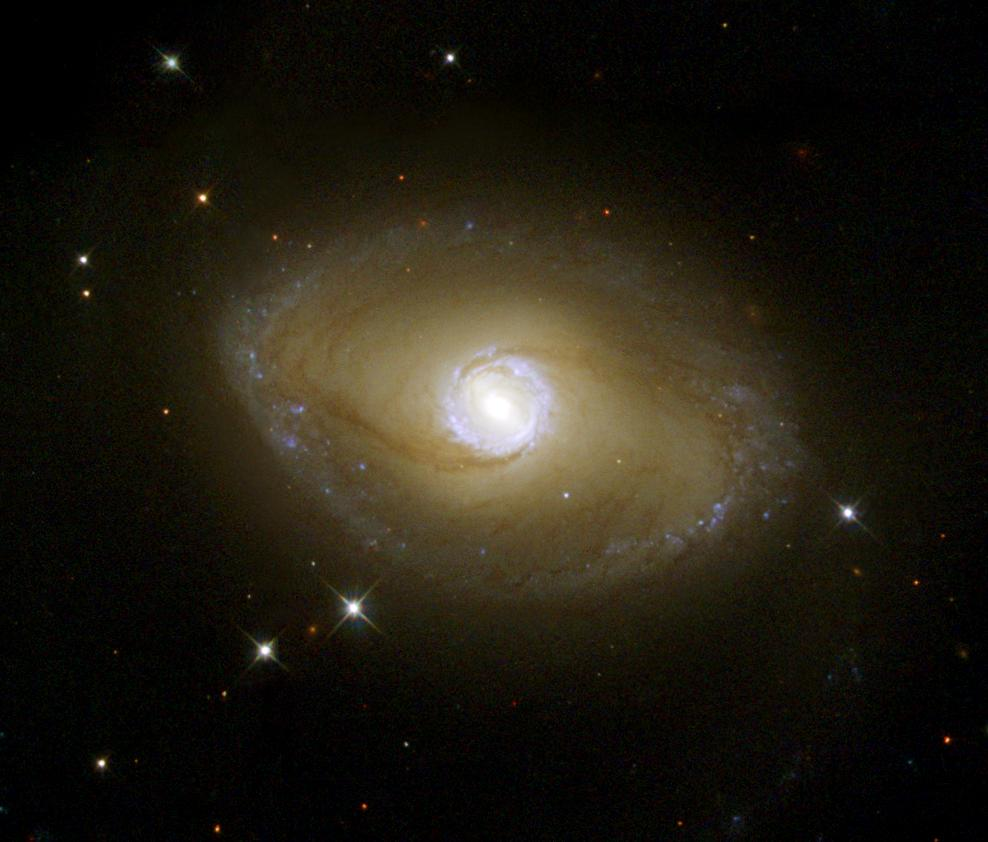
NGC 6782: a spiral galaxy (type SB(r)0/a) with three rings of different radii, as well as a bar

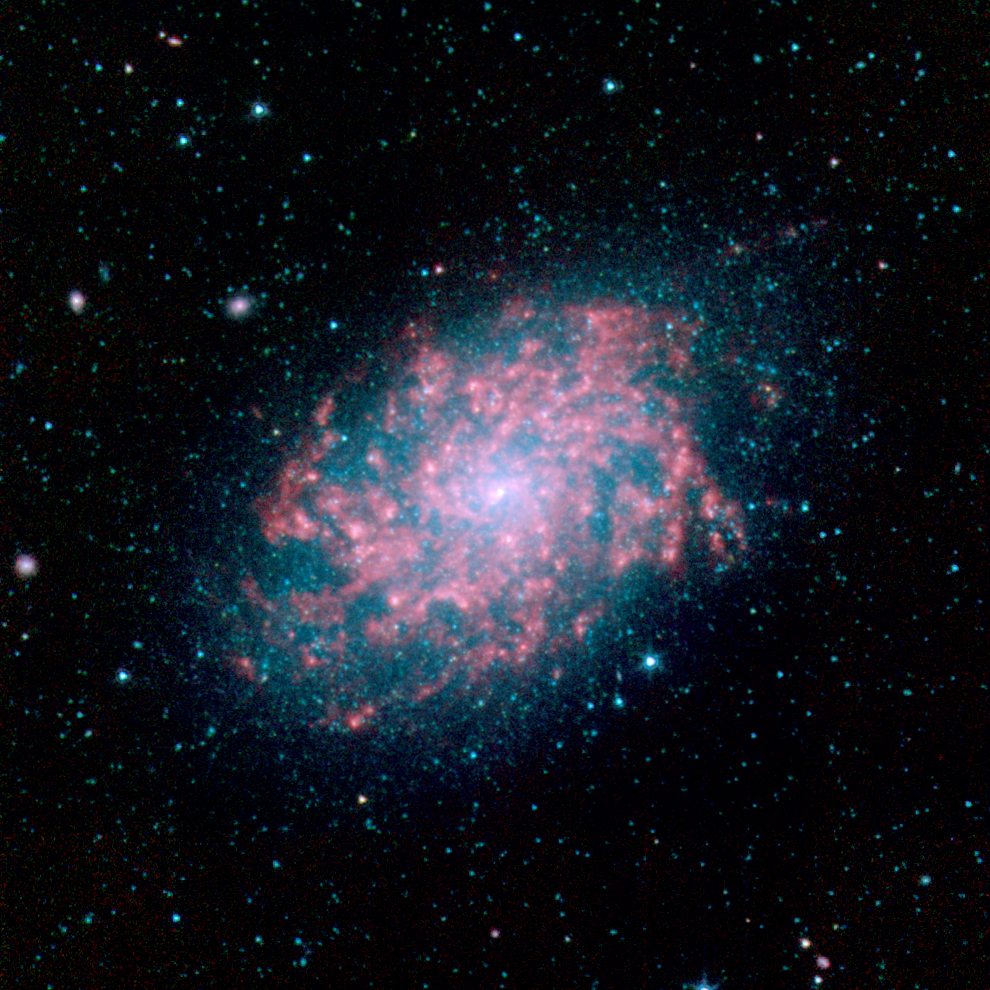
NGC 7793: a spiral galaxy of type SA(s)d

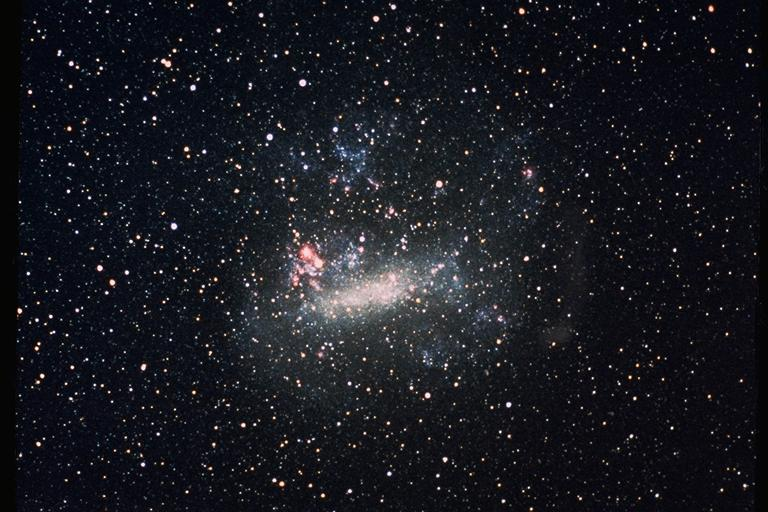
The Large Magellanic Cloud: a type SBm galaxy

The de Vaucouleurs system for classifying galaxies is a widely used extension to the Hubble sequence, first described by Gérard de Vaucouleurs in 1959. De Vaucouleurs argued that Hubble's two-dimensional classification of spiral galaxies—based on the tightness of the spiral arms and the presence or absence of a bar—did not adequately describe the full range of observed galaxy morphologies. In particular, he argued that rings and lenses are important structural components of spiral galaxies.

The de Vaucouleurs system retains Hubble's basic division of galaxies into ellipticals, lenticulars, spirals and irregulars. To complement Hubble's scheme, de Vaucouleurs introduced a more elaborate classification system for spiral galaxies, based on three morphological characteristics:

- Bars. Galaxies are divided on the basis of the presence or absence of a nuclear bar. De Vaucouleurs introduced the notation SA to denote spiral galaxies without bars, complementing Hubble's use of SB for barred spirals. He also allowed for an intermediate class, denoted SAB, containing weakly barred spirals. Lenticular galaxies are also classified as unbarred (SA0) or barred (SB0), with the notation S0 reserved for those galaxies for which it is impossible to tell if a bar is present or not (usually because they are edge-on to the line-of-sight).
- Rings. Galaxies are divided into those possessing ring-like structures (denoted '(r)') and those without rings (denoted '(s)'). So-called 'transition' galaxies are given the symbol (rs).
- Spiral arms. As in Hubble's original scheme, spiral galaxies are assigned to a class based primarily on the tightness of their spiral arms. The de Vaucouleurs scheme extends the arms of Hubble's tuning fork to include several additional spiral classes:
  - Sd (SBd) – diffuse, broken arms made up of individual stellar clusters and nebulae; very faint central bulge
  - Sm (SBm) – irregular in appearance; no bulge component
  - Im – highly irregular galaxy
  Most galaxies in these three classes were classified as Irr I in Hubble's original scheme. In addition, the Sd class contains some galaxies from Hubble's Sc class. Galaxies in the classes Sm and Im are termed the "Magellanic" spirals and irregulars, respectively, after the Magellanic Clouds. The Large Magellanic Cloud is of type SBm, while the Small Magellanic Cloud is an irregular (Im).

The different elements of the classification scheme are combined — in the order in which they are listed — to give the complete classification of a galaxy. For example, a weakly barred spiral galaxy with loosely wound arms and a ring is denoted SAB(r)c.

Visually, the de Vaucouleurs system can be represented as a three-dimensional version of Hubble's tuning fork, with stage (spiralness) on the x-axis, family (barredness) on the y-axis, and variety (ringedness) on the z-axis.

=== Numerical Hubble stage ===
De Vaucouleurs also assigned numerical values to each class of galaxy in his scheme. Values of the numerical Hubble stage T run from −6 to +10, with negative numbers corresponding to early-type galaxies (ellipticals and lenticulars) and positive numbers to late types (spirals and irregulars). Thus, as a rough rule, lower values of T correspond to a larger fraction of the stellar mass contained in a spheroid/bulge relative to the disk. The approximate mapping between the spheroid-to-total stellar mass ratio (M_{B}/M_{T}) and the Hubble stage is M_{B}/M_{T}=(10−T)^{2}/256 based on local galaxies.

Elliptical galaxies are divided into three 'stages': compact ellipticals (cE), normal ellipticals (E) and late types (E^{+}). Lenticulars are similarly subdivided into early (S^{−}), intermediate (S^{0}) and late (S^{+}) types. Irregular galaxies can be of type magellanic irregulars (T = 10) or 'compact' (T = 11).

Numerical Hubble stage
Hubble stage T	−6	−5	−4	−3	−2	−1	0	1	2	3	4	5	6	7	8	9	9-10	10	11	12	13
de Vaucouleurs class	cE	E	E^{+}	S0^{−}	S0^{0}	S0^{+}	S0/a	Sa	Sab	Sb	Sbc	Sc	Scd	Sd	Sdm	Sm	Ir	Im	Irp	d Trans	dSph
approximate Hubble class	E			S0			S0/a	Sa	Sa-b	Sb	Sb-c	Sc			Sc-Irr	Irr I			Irr Il	d E	dSph

The use of numerical stages allows for more quantitative studies of galaxy morphology.

== Yerkes (or Morgan) scheme ==
The Yerkes scheme was created by American astronomer William Wilson Morgan. Together with Philip Keenan, Morgan also developed the MK system for the classification of stars through their spectra. The Yerkes scheme uses the spectra of stars in the galaxy; the shape, real and apparent; and the degree of the central concentration to classify galaxies.

Spectral Type	Explanation
a	Prominent A stars
af	Prominent A–F stars
f	Prominent F stars
fg	Prominent F–G stars
g	Prominent G stars
gk	Prominent G–K stars
k	Prominent K stars

Galactic Shape	Explanation
B	Barred spiral
D	Rotational symmetry without pronounced spiral or elliptical structure
E	Elliptical
Ep	Elliptical with dust absorption
I	Irregular
L	Low surface brightness
N	Small bright nucleus
S	Spiral

Inclination	Explanation
1	Galaxy is "face-on"
2	
3	
4	
5	
6	
7	Galaxy is "edge-on"

Thus, for example, the Andromeda Galaxy is classified as kS5.

== Quantitative morphology ==
Quantitative morphological parameters have been in use in astronomy since the late 20th century. A 1985 paper by S. M. Kent first introduced the concept of "concentration," the ratio of two radii, each of which contain some portion of total galaxy luminosity. The formal definition of concentration is

$C = 5 \log [\frac{r(0.8)}{r(0.2)}]$,

where $r(0.8)$ and $r(0.2)$ are the radii containing 80% and 20% of total light measured from a galaxy, respectively. In 1995, D. Schade et al. developed the asymmetry parameter, a measure of the residual flux after a 180 degree rotation and subtraction of a galaxy image. The definition of asymmetry is

$A = \frac{\sum \frac{1}{2}|R_{ij}-R_{ij}^{180}|}{\sum I_{ij}}$,

where $R_{ij}$ is the residual image after subtraction and $I_{ij}$ is the original image.

In 1998, Sidney van den Bergh published a book on galaxy morphology in which he interrogated weaknesses in the Hubble sequence as a classification scheme. Subsequent work revealed further weaknesses. In 2003, Christopher Conselice formalized the CAS parameters, a set of quantitative morphological parameters which could be used to approximate the Hubble types of galaxy populations at low redshift. In 2004, a paper by Jennifer Lotz found that the Gini coefficient, when used in tandem with the second-order moment of the brightest 20% of the galaxy's flux (referred to as M_{20}) and the CAS parameters, could distinguish normal galaxies from mergers.

== See also ==
- Morphological Catalogue of Galaxies – Russian catalogue of 30,642 galaxies
- Galaxy color–magnitude diagram – Chart depicting the relationship between brightness and mass of large star systems
- Galaxy Zoo – Crowdsourced astronomy project
- William Wilson Morgan – American astronomer
- Fritz Zwicky – Swiss astronomer (1898–1974)
- CAS parameters – Scheme of quantitative morphological indicators
- Gini coefficient – Measure of economic inequality also used as a morphological indicator
