= NGC 931 =

Galaxy in the constellation Triangulum

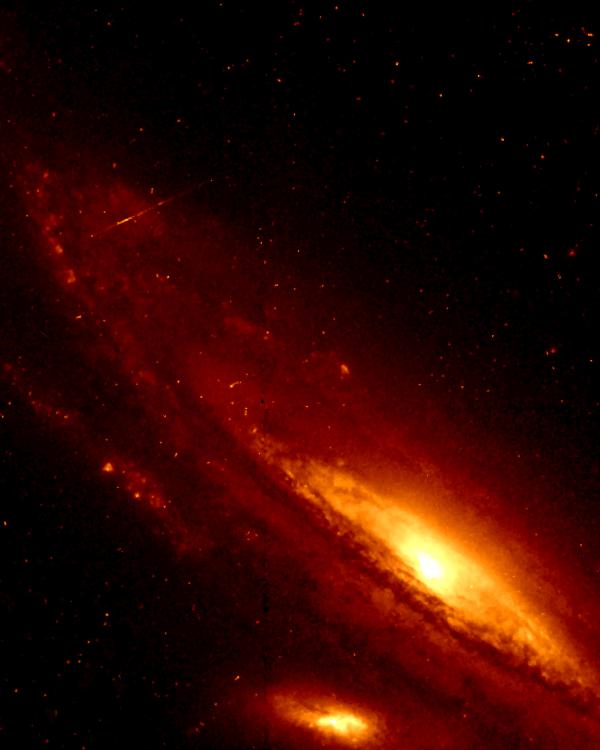
- NGC 931 imaged by the Hubble Space Telescope

Observation data (J2000 epoch)
- Constellation: Triangulum
- Right ascension: 02^{h} 28^{m} 14.5^{s}
- Declination: +31° 18′ 42″
- Redshift: 0.016652 ± 0.000020
- Heliocentric radial velocity: 4,992 ± 6 km/s
- Distance: 159 ± 30 Mly (48.7 ± 9.3 Mpc)
- Apparent magnitude (V): 13.5

Characteristics
- Type: Sbc
- Apparent size (V): 3.9′ × 0.8′
- Notable features: Seyfert galaxy

Other designations
- UGC 1935, Mrk 1040, KUG 0225+310, CGCG 504-089, MCG +05-06-049, PGC 9399

NGC 931 is a spiral galaxy located in the constellation Triangulum. It is located at a distance of circa 200 million light-years from Earth, which, given its apparent dimensions, means that NGC 931 is about 200,000 light years across. It was discovered by Heinrich d'Arrest on September 26, 1865. It is classified as a Seyfert galaxy.

== Characteristics ==
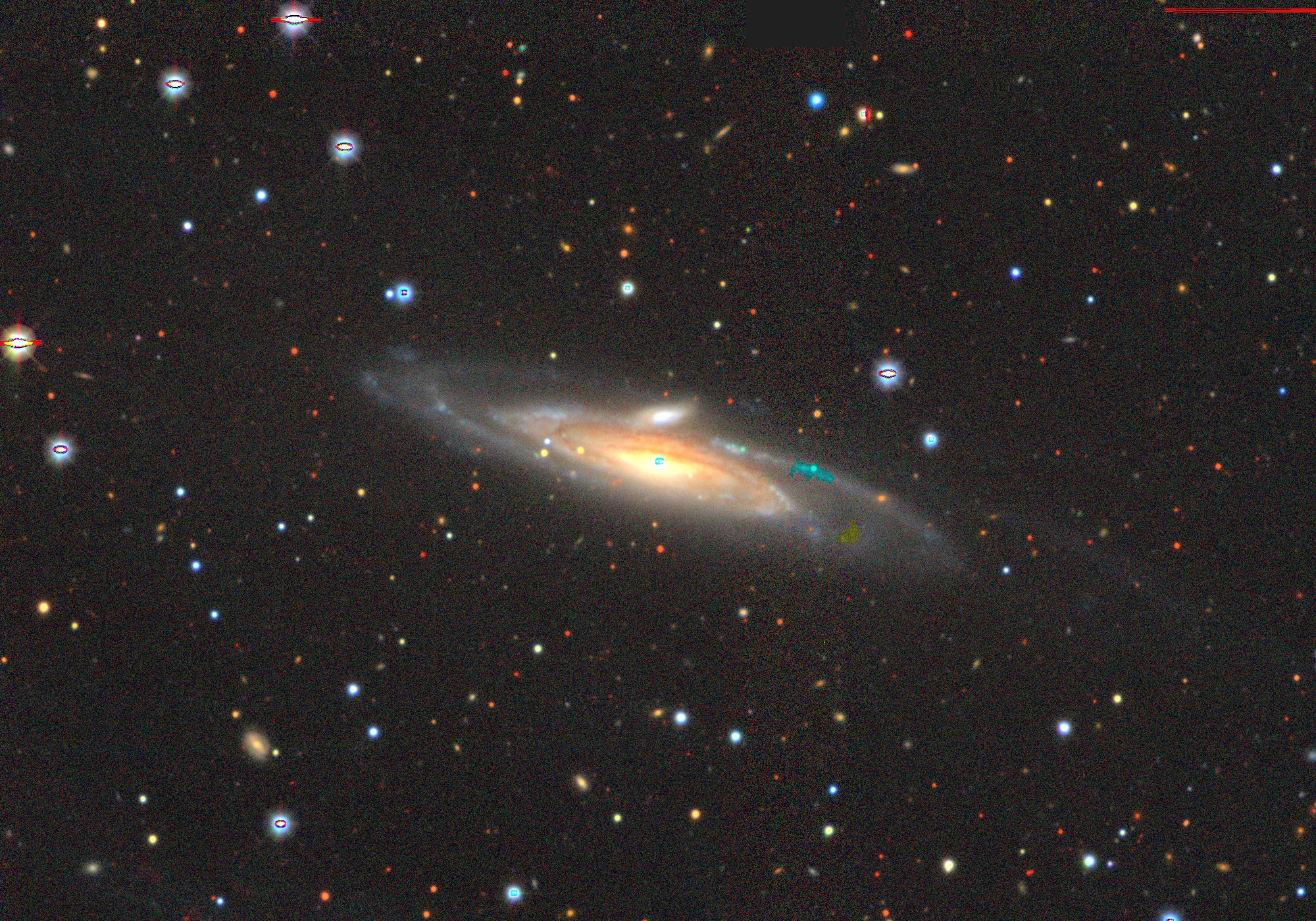
NGC 931 imaged by Legacy Surveys

The nucleus of NGC 931 has been found to be active and it has been categorised as a type I Seyfert galaxy due to its narrow H-beta emission line. The most accepted theory for the energy source of active galactic nuclei is the presence of an accretion disk around a supermassive black hole. The mass of the black hole in the centre of NGC 931 is estimated to be 10^{7.64 ± 0.40} (17- 110 million) M_{☉} based on the stellar velocity dispersion.

NGC 931 has been found to emit radiowaves, ultraviolet and X-rays. Observations by ASCA revealed the X-ray spectrum was composed of soft and hard emission. The hard element was identified as a strong and wide fluorescent FeKa line, which is created when X-rays meet an optically cold thick material. The soft element has been identified as warm absorbing material. The galaxy was further observed by XMM-Newton, where it was observed that there were significant fluctuations and time lags in the flux changes observed both in the soft and hard elements.

A detail X-ray spectrum of NGC 931 was obtained by Chandra X-ray Observatory. It revealed the presence of many absorption lines from neon, magnesium, and silicon, with a variety of ionisation states. These lines were attributed to low ionisation gases surrounding the nuclear X-ray source. No significant outflowing gas was detected in the large scale.

== Supernova ==
One supernova has been observed in NGC 931. SN 2009lw was discovered by W. Li, S. B. Cenko, and A. V. Filippenko during the Lick Observatory Supernova Search on 24.24 November 2009, when it had an apparent magnitude of 18.8. It was identified as a Type-Ib or possibly a Type-IIb supernova a few months past maximum light.

== Nearby galaxies ==
NGC 931 has been identified as a member of the NGC 973 group, one of the largest galaxy groups of the Perseus–Pisces Supercluster, with at least 39 galaxies identified as its members. Other members of the group include NGC 917, NGC 940, NGC 969, NGC 973, NGC 974, NGC 978, NGC 987, NGC 983, NGC 1060, NGC 1066, NGC 1067, and UGC 2105. On the other hand, Garcia recognised NGC 931 as the largest galaxy in a galaxy group known as the NGC 931 group, which also included NGC 940.

A smaller companion galaxy, PGC 212995, measuring 0.2 by 0.1 arcminutes, is superimposed on the galaxy, lying about 0.35 arcminutes towards the north.

== See also ==
- NGC 1532 - a similar spiral galaxy
