= NGC 5957 =

Galaxy in the constellation of Serpens

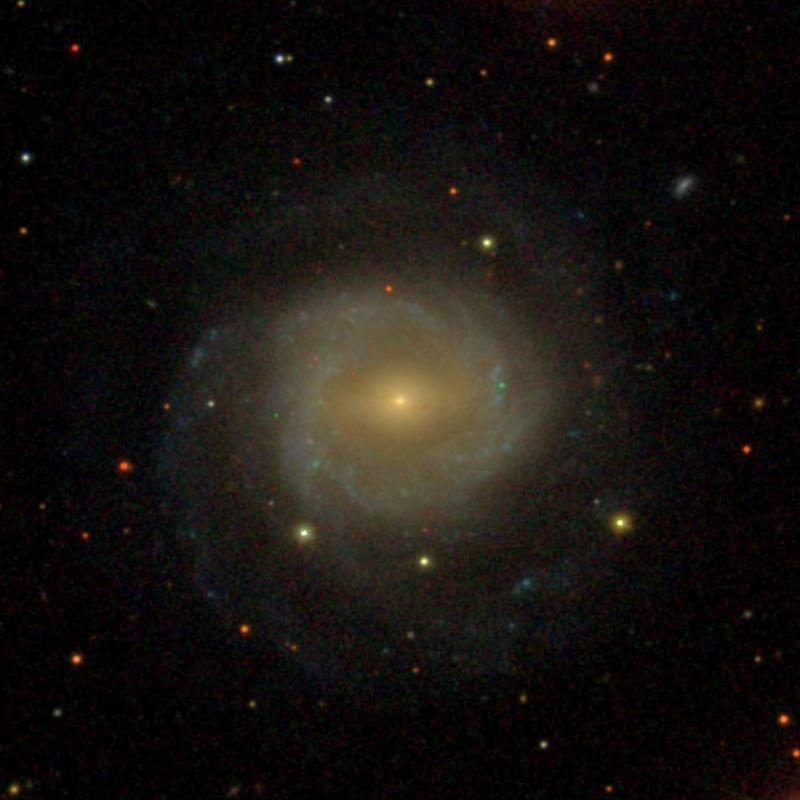
- NGC 5957 imaged by the Sloan Digital Sky Survey

Observation data (J2000 epoch)
- Constellation: Serpens
- Right ascension: 15^{h} 35^{m} 23.2342^{s}
- Declination: +12° 02′ 51.203″
- Redshift: 0.006051 ± 0.000009
- Heliocentric radial velocity: 1,814 ± 3 km/s
- Distance: 104 ± 7.2 Mly (31.8 ± 2.2 Mpc)
- Apparent magnitude (V): 12.1

Characteristics
- Type: (R')SAB(r)b
- Size: ~75,000 ly (23.1 kpc) (estimated)
- Apparent size (V): 2.8′ × 2.6′

Other designations
- IRAS 15330+1212, UGC 9915, MCG +02-40-004, PGC 55520, CGCG 078-018

NGC 5957 is a spiral galaxy located in the constellation Serpens. It lies at a distance of about 100 million light years from Earth based on redshift-independent methods, which, given its apparent dimensions, means that NGC 5957 is about 75,000 light years across. It was discovered by Heinrich d'Arrest on April 29, 1865.

NGC 5957 has a bar which is 0.96 arcminutes across. At the end of the bar lies an inner ring with a diameter of 0.94 arcminutes. From the ring emerge multiple spiral arms which form an outer ring with a diameter of 2.38 arcminutes. The nucleus of the galaxy has been found to be active and has been identified as a LINER. The nucleus emits H-alpha that can't be resolved.

One supernova has been discovered in NGC 5957, SN 2025fvw. It was discovered by Kōichi Itagaki on 26 March 2025 at an apparent magnitude of 17.4. It was identified as a Type Ia supernova.

NGC 5957 forms a pair with NGC 5956. A. M. Garcia considers NGC 5970 a member of the group, naming it LGG 401. Other nearby galaxies include NGC 5953, NGC 5954, and NGC 5962.
