= NGC 973 =

Galaxy in the constellation Triangulum

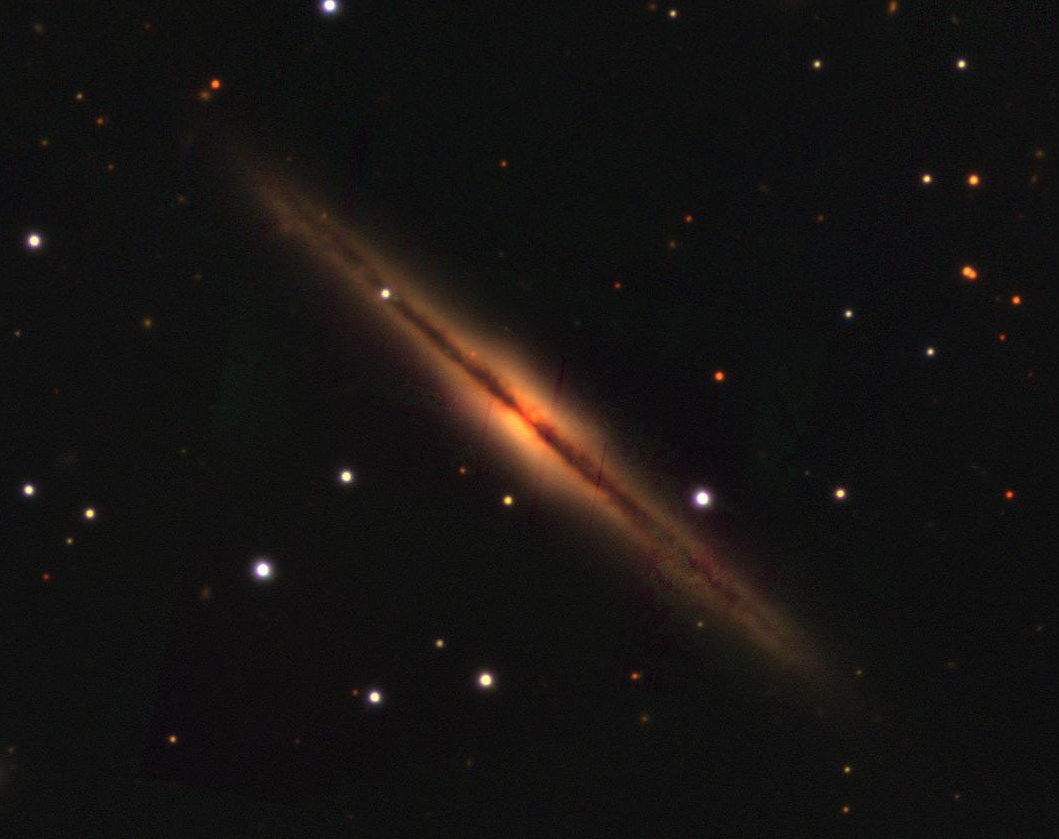
- NGC 973 by Pan-STARRS

Observation data (J2000 epoch)
- Constellation: Triangulum
- Right ascension: 02^{h} 34^{m} 20.1^{s}
- Declination: +32° 30′ 20″
- Redshift: 0.016195 ± 0.000027
- Heliocentric radial velocity: 4,855 ± 8 km/s
- Distance: 195 ± 16 Mly (60.0 ± 4.8 Mpc)
- Apparent magnitude (V): 12.8

Characteristics
- Type: Sbc
- Size: 224,800 ly (68.94 kpc) (estimated)
- Apparent size (V): 4.03′ × 0.47′
- Notable features: Seyfert galaxy

Other designations
- UGC 2048, CGCG 505-014, MCG +05-07-013, PGC 9795

NGC 973 is a giant spiral galaxy located in the constellation Triangulum. It is located at a distance of circa 200 million light-years from Earth, which, given its apparent dimensions, means that NGC 973 is about 230,000 light years across. It was discovered by Lewis Swift on October 30, 1885.

== Characteristics ==
NGC 973 is seen edge-on, with an inclination of nearly 90°. Its bulge is shaped like a box or peanut. The subtraction of axisymmetric components from the profile of the galaxy showed that its bulge has an X-like morphology, which indicates the presence of a bar. A prominent dust lane runs across the galaxy.

The galaxy kinematics revealed that the northeast side is the approaching one and the southwest is receding. The disk appears flat, without warps. The total hydrogen mass of the galaxy is estimated to be about 9×10^{9} M_{☉}, and the total dust mass is estimated to be 1.4×10^{8} M_{☉}, with clumpy distribution. Faint emission from gas lying outside the plane of the galaxy was detected in H-alpha, correlated with the galactic disk and halo.

The nucleus of NGC 973 appears to be active based on its emission. It is categorised as a Type II Seyfert galaxy. The most accepted theory for the energy source of active galactic nuclei is the presence of an accretion disk around a supermassive black hole.

== Nearby galaxies ==
NGC 973 is the largest galaxy in a galaxy group known as the NGC 973 group. The NGC 973 group is one of the largest galaxy groups of the Perseus–Pisces Supercluster, with at least 39 galaxies identified as its members. Other members of the group include NGC 917, NGC 931, NGC 940, NGC 969, NGC 974, NGC 978, NGC 987, NGC 983, NGC 1060, NGC 1066, NGC 1067, and UGC 2105.

NGC 973 forms a pair with IC 1815, which lies 4.6 arcminutes to the south. A small satellite was discovered in HI imaging near the northeast edge of the disk of NGC 973, with no optical counterpart.

== Supernova ==
One supernova has been observed in NGC 973:

- SN 2025agyg (Type Ia, mag. 19.72) was discovered by Pan-STARRS on 24 November 2025.

== Gallery ==
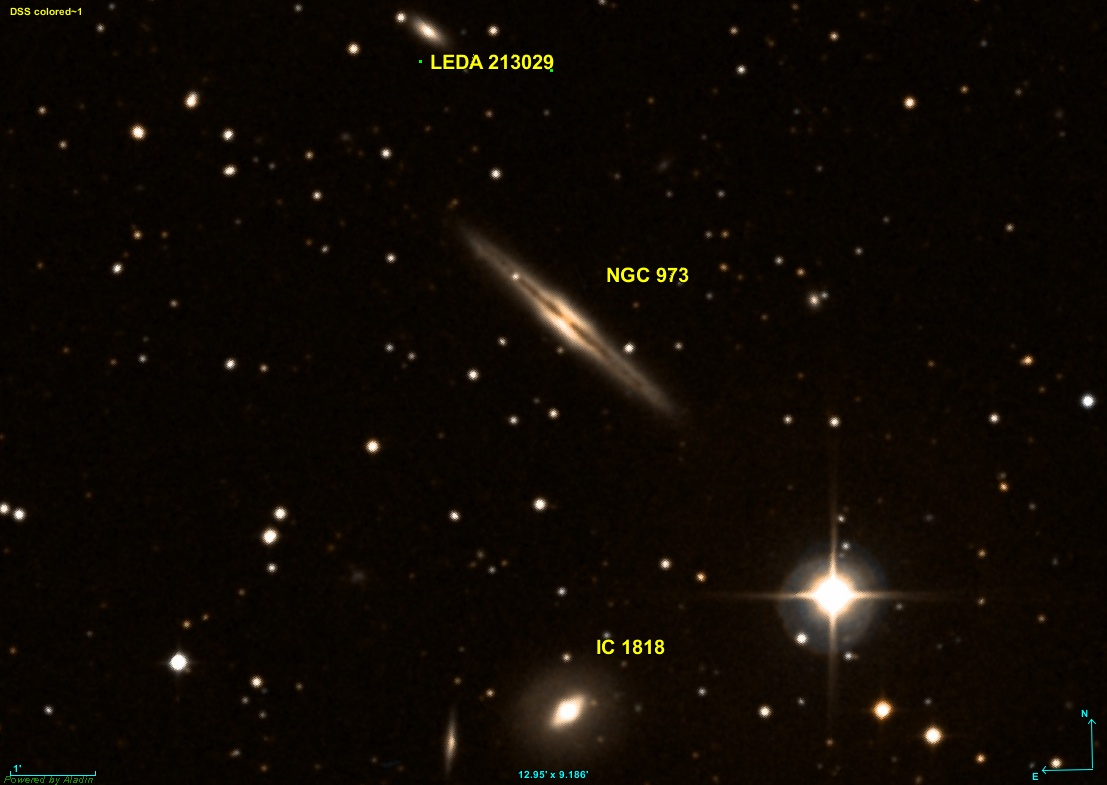
NGC 973 (DSS)

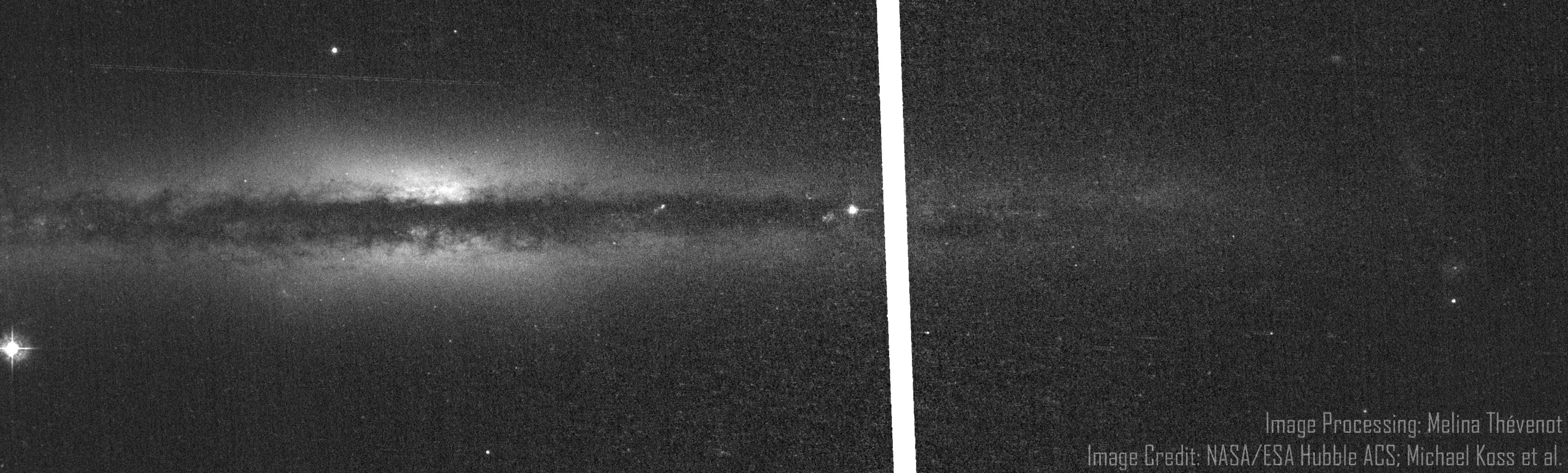
Hubble image
