= NGC 5953 =

Galaxy in the constellation Serpens

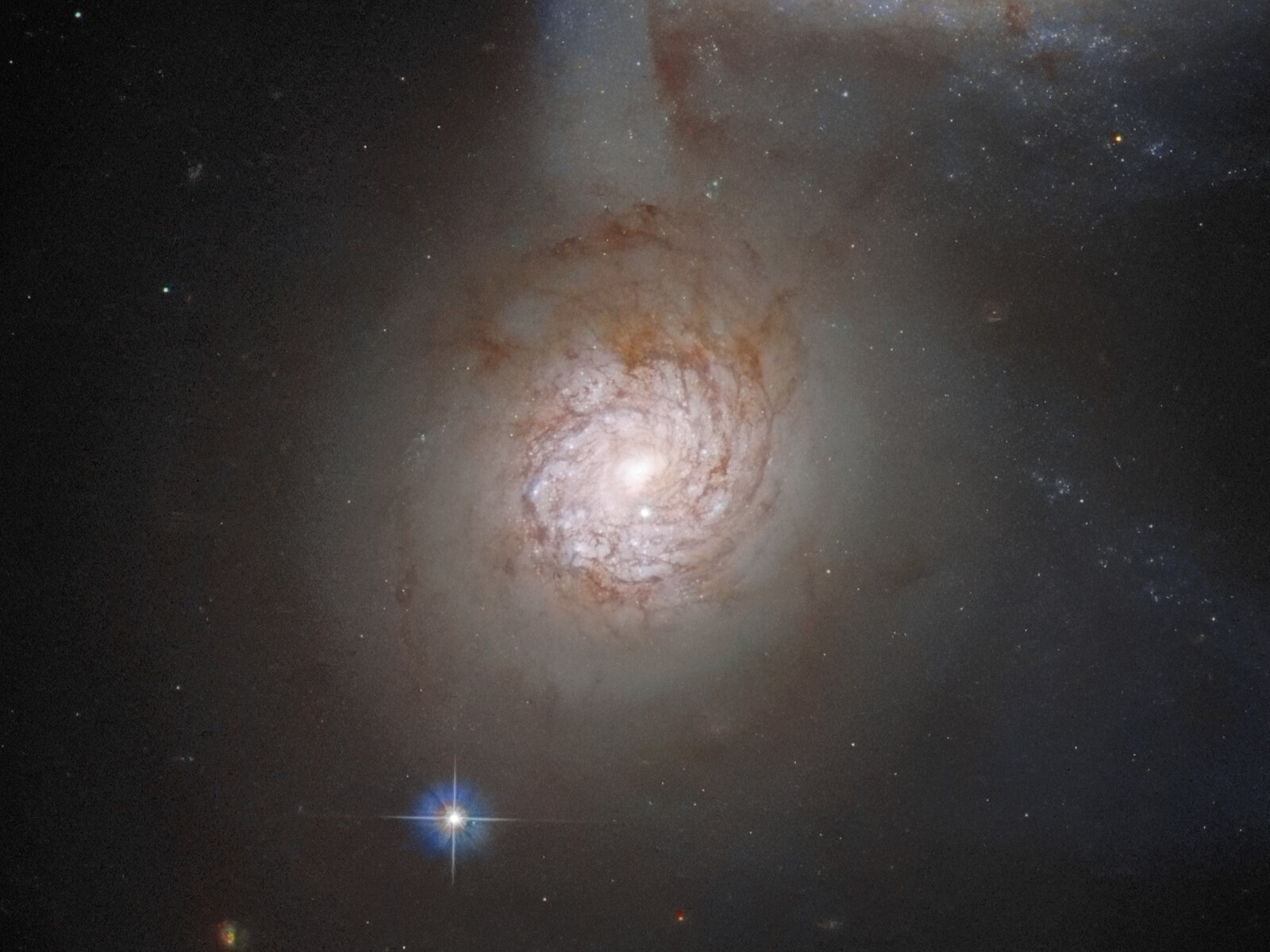
- NGC 5953 by Hubble Space Telescope

Observation data (J2000 epoch)
- Constellation: Serpens
- Right ascension: 15^{h} 34^{m} 32.4^{s}
- Declination: 15° 11′ 38″
- Redshift: 0.006555 ± 0.000020
- Heliocentric radial velocity: 1965 ± 6 km/s
- Distance: 78 ± 15 Mly (26 ± 4.7 Mpc)
- Apparent magnitude (V): 13.0

Characteristics
- Type: SAa: pec
- Apparent size (V): 1.35′ × 1.16′
- Notable features: interacting galaxy, Seyfert galaxy

Other designations
- UGC 9903, Arp 91B, VV 244a, MRK 9031, MCG +03-40-005, PGC 55480

NGC 5953 is a peculiar spiral galaxy in the constellation Serpens. The galaxy lies about 80 million light years away from Earth, which means, given its apparent dimensions, that NGC 5953 is approximately 35,000 light years across. It was discovered by William Herschel on April 17, 1784. NGC 5953 interacts with NGC 5954 forming a pair known as Arp 91.

== Characteristics ==
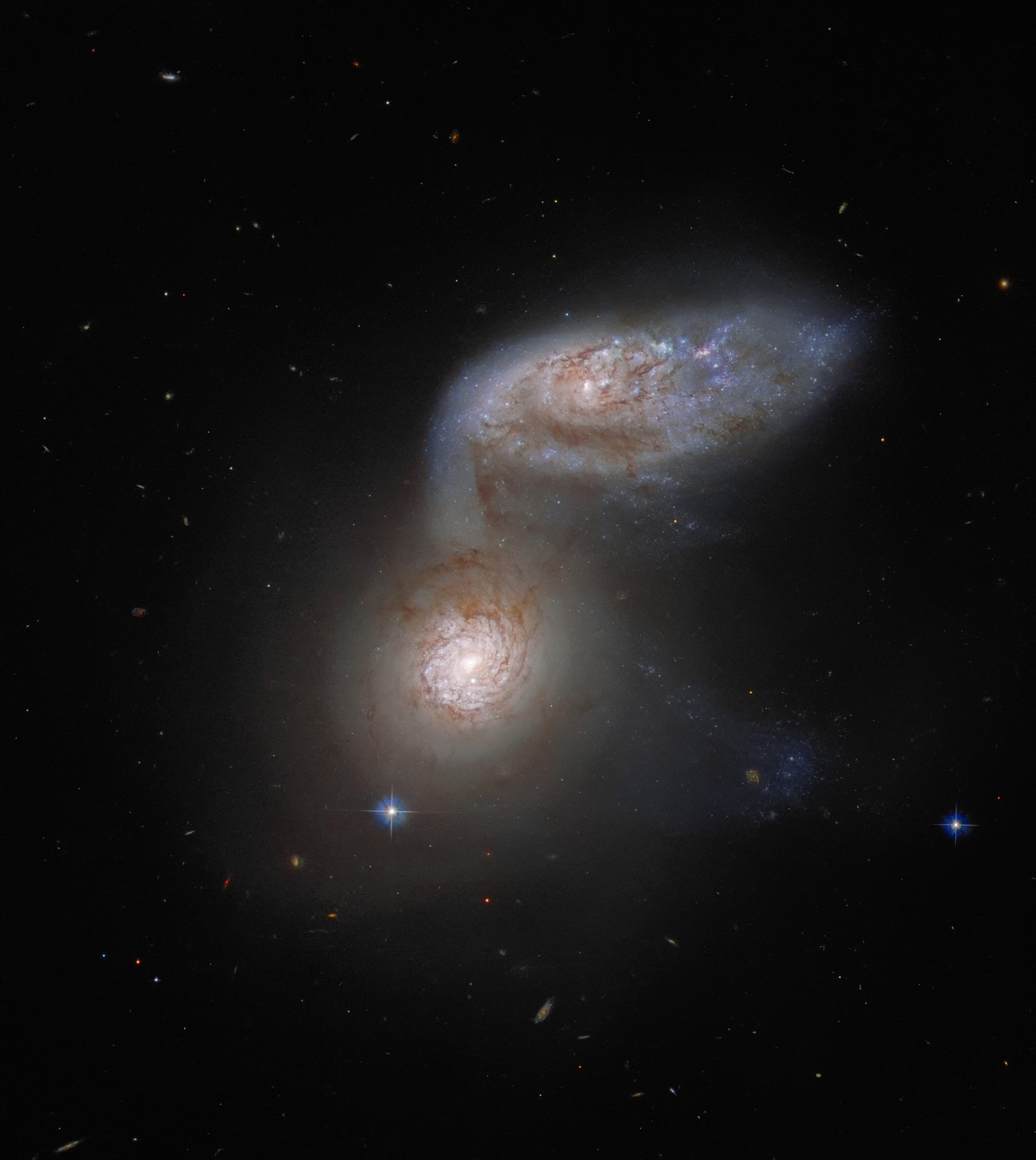
NGC 5953 and NGC 5954 pair

NGC 5953 is an unbarred spiral galaxy seen face on with many dust lanes. Two tidal plumes are visible, one to the northwest and one to the south of the galaxy. The spiral arms are flocculent and appear fragmented and are associated with star formation regions.

The galaxy has recently undergone intense star formation in the circumnuclear region around the nucleus where there are huge HII regions, probably as a result of its interaction with NGC 5954. The large HII region has been found to emit radio waves, appearing as a discrete source 5 arcseconds from the nucleus. A circumnuclear star ring with a diameter of 10–14 arcseconds is visible, which coincides with a disk of CO gas. Based on near infrared observations the ring hosts a red giant but not hot gas. The total star formation rate of the galaxy is estimated to be 2.56 ± 0.1 M_{☉} per year.

=== Active nucleus ===
The nucleus of the galaxy has been found to be active and it is categorised as a type 2 Seyfert galaxy or as a LINER. The most accepted theory for the energy source of active galactic nuclei is the presence of an accretion disk around a supermassive black hole. The black hole in the nucleus of NGC 5953 is estimated to have a mass of 7×10^{6} M_{☉} based on velocity dispersion.

A jet is visible to the north of the nucleus in radio waves extending for 0.3 arcseconds, which corresponds to a projected distance of 40 parsecs in the distance of the galaxy.

== Nearby galaxies ==
NGC 5953 forms a pair with another spiral galaxy, NGC 5954, which lies 43 arcminutes away. The interaction has distorted NGC 5954. The pair is part of the NGC 5962 group or LGG 400. Other members of the group, apart from NGC 5962, include UGC 9925 and UGC 9951. A bit further away lie NGC 5951, NGC 5956, and NGC 5957.
