= NGC 2446 =

Galaxy in the constellation Lynx

- NGC 2446 imaged by Pan-STARRS

Observation data (J2000 epoch)
- Constellation: Lynx
- Right ascension: 07^{h} 48^{m} 39.2173^{s}
- Declination: +54° 36′ 42.570″
- Redshift: 0.018906±0.0000200
- Heliocentric radial velocity: 5,668±6 km/s
- Distance: 233.94 ± 7.66 Mly (71.725 ± 2.350 Mpc)
- Group or cluster: LDC 537
- Apparent magnitude (V): 13.73

Characteristics
- Type: Sb
- Size: ~158,200 ly (48.51 kpc) (estimated)
- Apparent size (V): 1.9′ × 1.0′

Other designations
- IRAS 07446+5444, 2MASX J07483926+5436430, UGC 4027, MCG +09-13-058, PGC 21860, CGCG 262-030

NGC 2446 is a spiral galaxy in the constellation of Lynx. Its velocity with respect to the cosmic microwave background is 5,766±9 km/s, which corresponds to a Hubble distance of 277.4 ± 19.4 Mly (85.04 ± 5.96 Mpc). However, eight non-redshift measurements give a closer mean distance of 233.94 ± 7.66 Mly (71.725 ± 2.350 Mpc). It was discovered by British astronomer John Herschel on 10 February 1831.

NGC 2446 has a possible active galactic nucleus, i.e. it has a compact region at the center of a galaxy that emits a significant amount of energy across the electromagnetic spectrum, with characteristics indicating that this luminosity is not produced by the stars.

== Galaxy group ==
NGC 2446 is member of a small galaxy group known as LDC 537. The other three galaxies in the group are Z 262-54, UGC 4035, and Z 262-35.

== Supernovae ==
Two supernovae have been observed in NGC 2446:

- SN 2014ak (Type Ia, mag. 17.9) was discovered by the Xingming Observatory Sky Survey (XOSS) on 26 March 2014.
- SN 2026aesj (Type Ia, mag. 18.435) was discovered by ATLAS on 7 October 2026.

== See also ==
- List of NGC objects (2001–3000)
