= UGC 3855 =

Spiral galaxy in the Lynx constellation

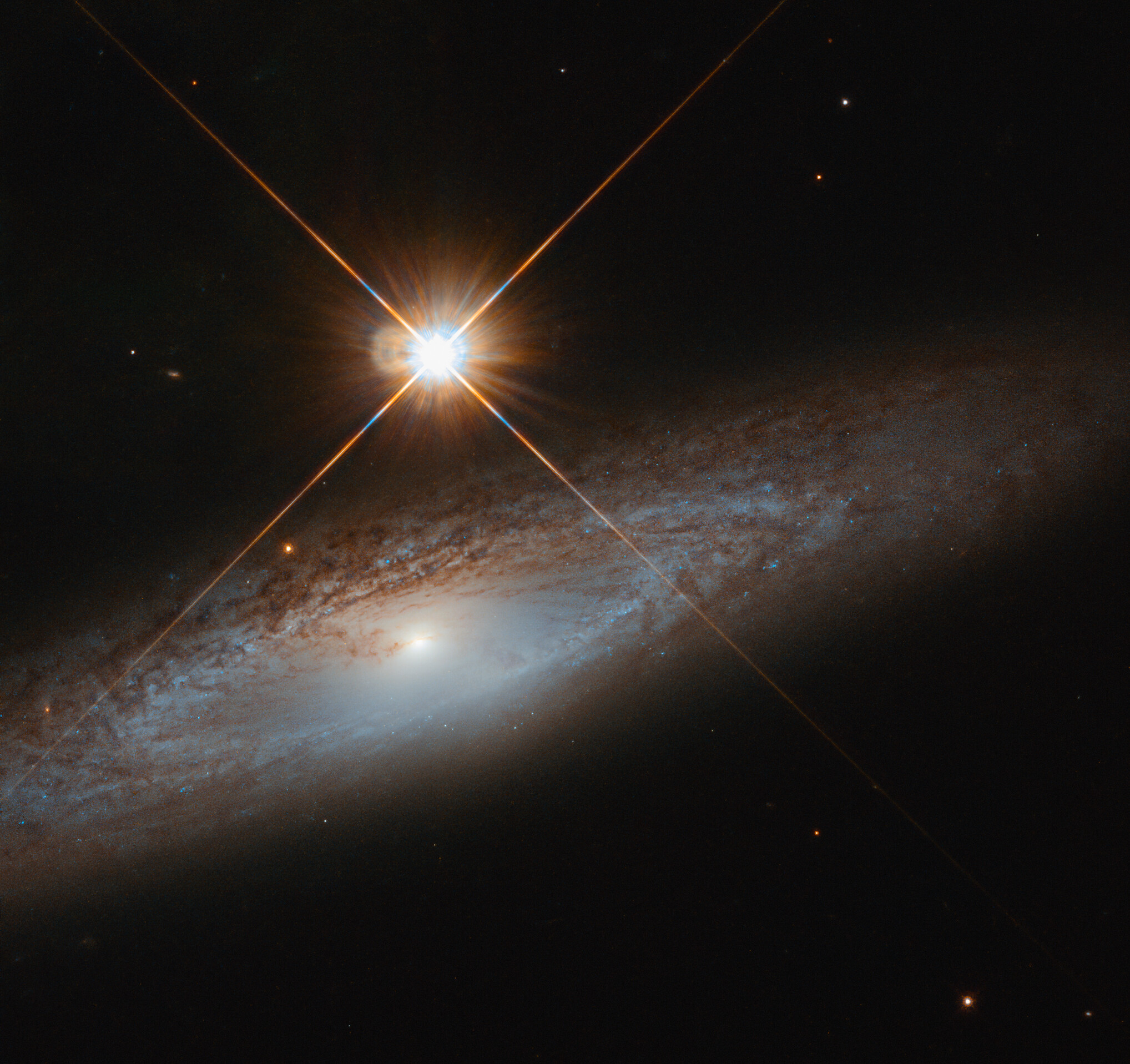
- UGC 3855 and a foreground star imaged by the Hubble Space Telescope

Observation data (J2000 epoch)
- Constellation: Lynx
- Right ascension: 07^{h} 28^{m} 12.8469^{s}
- Declination: +58° 30′ 22.881″
- Redshift: 0.010564±0.0000270
- Heliocentric radial velocity: 3,167±8 km/s
- Distance: 130.95 ± 11.37 Mly (40.150 ± 3.486 Mpc)

Characteristics
- Type: Sab
- Size: ~93,200 ly (28.59 kpc) (estimated)

Other designations
- IRAS F07239+5836, 2MASX J07281299+5830242, MCG +10-11-052, PGC 21067, CGCG 286-020

UGC 3855, also known as PGC 21067 or sometimes as the Modest galaxy, is a spiral galaxy in the constellation of Lynx. Its velocity with respect to the cosmic microwave background is 3,236±9 km/s, which corresponds to a Hubble distance of 155.7 ± 10.9 Mly (47.73 ± 3.35 Mpc). However, 4 non-redshift measurements give a closer mean distance of 130.95 ± 11.37 Mly (40.150 ± 3.486 Mpc). The first known reference to this galaxy comes from Part 1 of the Morphological Catalogue of Galaxies, published in 1962, where it is listed as MCG +10-11-052.

It is a relatively old galaxy with a stellar population around 10.6 billion years old. It also has a low rate of star formation of about 0.2 solar masses per year.

== Supernova ==
One supernova has been observed in UGC 3855: SN 2021agco (Type Ib, mag. 17.6) was discovered by the Xingming Observatory Sky Survey (XOSS) on 5 December 2021. It is the closest ultra-stripped supernova yet discovered.
