= NGC 5162 =

Galaxy in the constellation Virgo

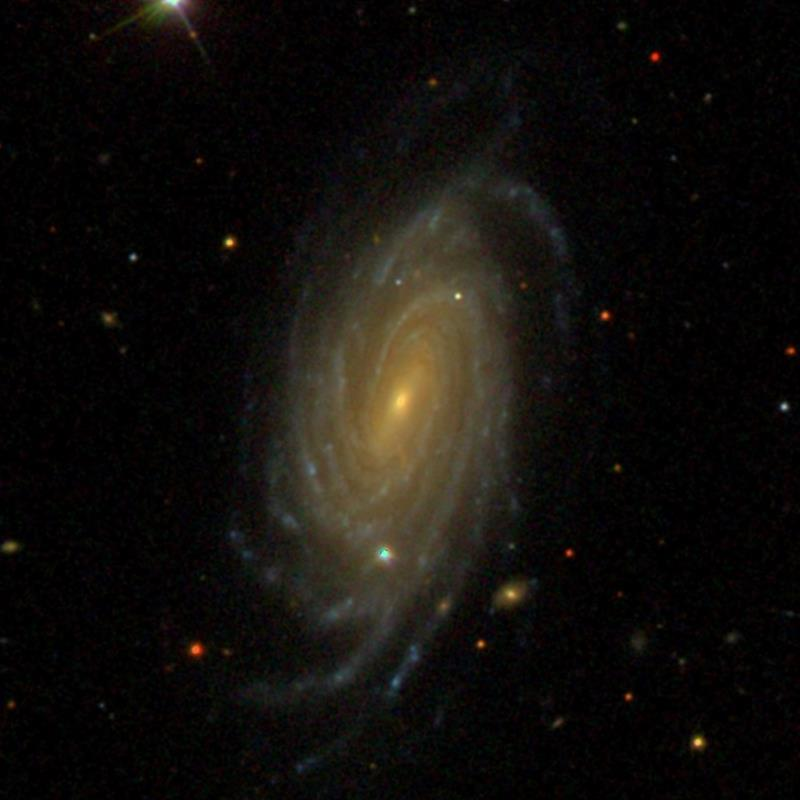
- NGC 5162 imaged by SDSS

Observation data (J2000 epoch)
- Constellation: Virgo
- Right ascension: 13^{h} 29^{m} 25.9296^{s}
- Declination: +11° 00′ 28.534″
- Redshift: 0.022799
- Heliocentric radial velocity: 6835 ± 1 km/s
- Distance: 342.8 ± 24.0 Mly (105.09 ± 7.36 Mpc)
- Apparent magnitude (V): 13.0

Characteristics
- Type: Scd?
- Size: ~326,900 ly (100.22 kpc) (estimated)
- Apparent size (V): 2.7′ × 1.4′

Other designations
- IRAS 13269+1115, 2MASX J13292596+1100285, NGC 5174, UGC 8475, MCG +02-34-018, PGC 47346, CGCG 072-087

NGC 5162 is a very large spiral galaxy in the constellation of Virgo. Its velocity with respect to the cosmic microwave background is 7125 ± 20 km/s, which corresponds to a Hubble distance of 342.8 ± 24.0 Mly (105.09 ± 7.36 Mpc). In addition, 11 non redshift measurements give a distance of 303.71 ± 12.41 Mly (93.118 ± 3.806 Mpc). The galaxy was discovered by German-British astronomer William Herschel on 15 March 1784. It was also observed by Lewis Swift on 19 April 1887, resulting in the galaxy being included twice in the New General Catalogue, as both NGC 5162 and NGC 5174.

The SIMBAD database lists NGC 5162 as a LINER galaxy, i.e. a galaxy whose nucleus has an emission spectrum characterized by broad lines of weakly ionized atoms. NGC 5162 is a field galaxy, i.e. it does not belong to a larger galaxy group or cluster and hence is gravitationally alone.

== Supernovae ==
Two supernovae have been observed in NGC 5162:

- Kōichi Itagaki discovered SN 2007cd (type unknown, mag. 17.5) on 27 April 2007.
- The Xingming Observatory Sky Survey discovered SN 2024aawh (Type II, mag. 18.11) on 10 November 2024.

== See also ==
- List of NGC objects (5001–6000)
