= NGC 3780 =

Galaxy in the constellation Ursa Major

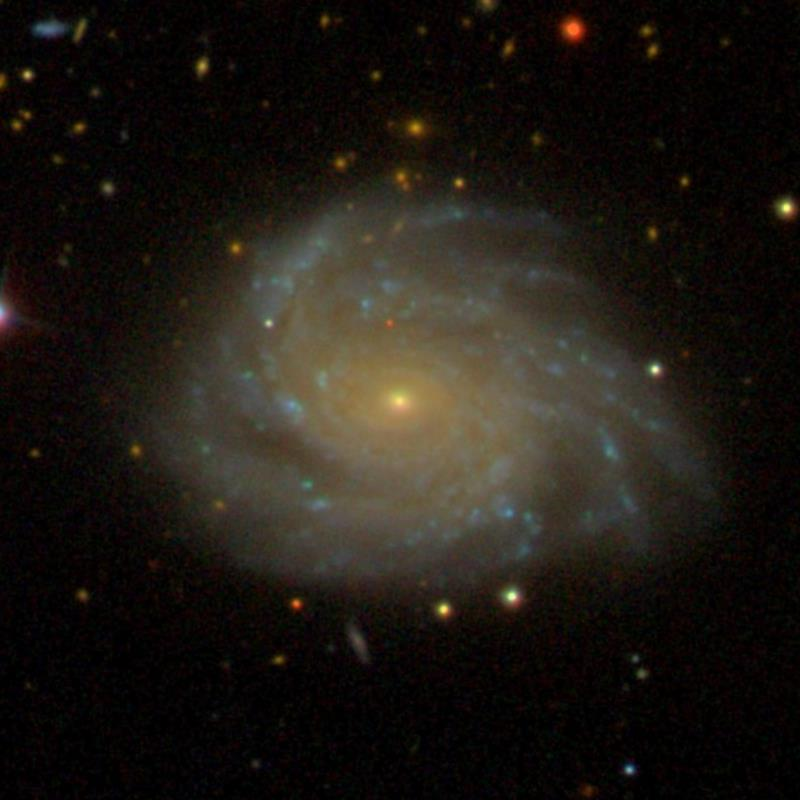
- NGC 3780 imaged by SDSS

Observation data (J2000 epoch)
- Constellation: Ursa Major
- Right ascension: 11^{h} 39^{m} 22.3603^{s}
- Declination: +56° 16′ 14.452″
- Redshift: 0.007976±0.00000667
- Heliocentric radial velocity: 2,391±2 km/s
- Distance: 109.65 ± 9.10 Mly (33.620 ± 2.789 Mpc)
- Group or cluster: NGC 3780 group (LGG 247)
- Apparent magnitude (V): 12.16

Characteristics
- Type: SA(s)c
- Size: ~98,900 ly (30.32 kpc) (estimated)
- Apparent size (V): 3.1′ × 2.5′

Other designations
- IRAS 11366+5632, UGC 6615, MCG +09-19-150, PGC 36138, CGCG 292-014

NGC 3780 is a spiral galaxy in the constellation of Ursa Major. Its velocity with respect to the cosmic microwave background is 2,557±12 km/s, which corresponds to a Hubble distance of 123.0 ± 8.6 Mly (37.71 ± 2.65 Mpc). However, 10 non-redshift measurements give a closer mean distance of 109.65 ± 9.10 Mly (33.620 ± 2.789 Mpc). It was discovered by German-British astronomer William Herschel on 14 April 1789.

NGC 3780 is a LINER galaxy, i.e. a galaxy whose nucleus has an emission spectrum characterized by broad lines of weakly ionized atoms. It also has an active galaxy nucleus, i.e. it has a compact region at the center of a galaxy that emits a significant amount of energy across the electromagnetic spectrum, with characteristics indicating that this luminosity is not produced by the stars.

== NGC 3780 group ==
According to A. M. Garcia, NGC 3780 is the namesake of a small group of galaxies. The NGC 3780 group (also known as LGG 247) includes at least four galaxies, including NGC 3888, UGC 6596, and UGC 6774.

== Supernovae ==
Three supernovae have been observed in NGC 3780:

- SN 1978H (Type II, mag. 16.5) was discovered by Swiss astronomer Paul Wild on 7 November 1978.
- SN 1992bt (Type II, mag. 16) was discovered by the Leuschner Observatory Supernova Search on 19 December 1992.
- SN 2024btj (Type II, mag. 18.53) was discovered by the Xingming Observatory Sky Survey (XOSS) on 5 February 2024.

== See also ==
- List of NGC objects (3001–4000)
