= NGC 3888 =

Galaxy in the constellation Ursa Major

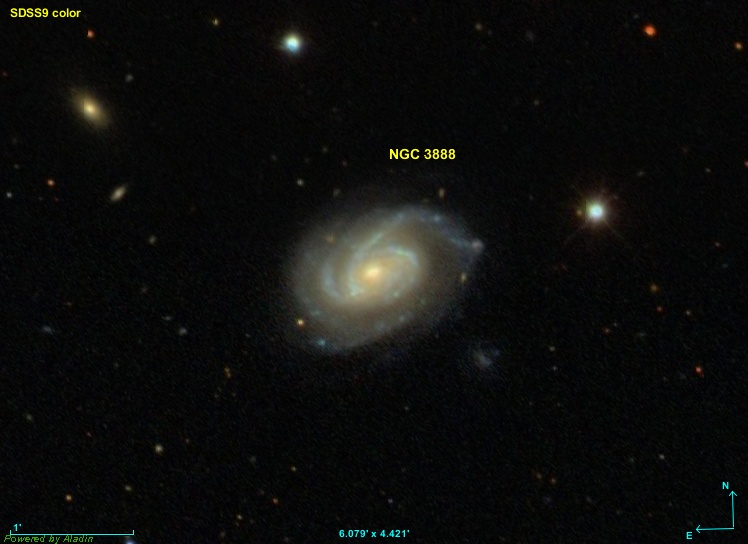
- NGC 3888 imaged by SDSS

Observation data (J2000 epoch)
- Constellation: Ursa Major
- Right ascension: 11^{h} 47^{m} 34.3762^{s}
- Declination: +55° 58′ 01.664″
- Redshift: 0.007986±0.0000100
- Heliocentric radial velocity: 2,394±3 km/s
- Distance: 129.97 ± 2.51 Mly (39.850 ± 0.770 Mpc)
- Group or cluster: NGC 3780 group (LGG 247)
- Apparent magnitude (V): 12.7g

Characteristics
- Type: SAB(rs)c
- Size: ~74,200 ly (22.74 kpc) (estimated)
- Apparent size (V): 1.31′ × 1.15′

Other designations
- IRAS 11449+5614, 2MASX J11473433+5558021, UGC 6765, MCG +09-19-189, Mrk 188, PGC 36789, CGCG 268-085, VV 455

NGC 3888 is an intermediate spiral galaxy in the constellation of Ursa Major. Its velocity with respect to the cosmic microwave background is 2,560±12 km/s, which corresponds to a Hubble distance of 123.2 ± 8.6 Mly (37.76 ± 2.65 Mpc). Additionally, six non-redshift measurements give a farther mean distance of 129.97 ± 2.51 Mly (39.850 ± 0.770 Mpc). It was discovered by German-British astronomer William Herschel on 14 April 1789.

NGC 3888 is a starburst galaxy. It also has a nucleus which shines in the ultraviolet range, and is thus listed in Markarian's catalogue as Mrk 188.

== NGC 3780 group ==
NGC 3888 is a member of the NGC 3780 group (also known as LGG 247). This group contains 4 galaxies, including NGC 3780, UGC 6596, and UGC 6774.

== Supernova ==
One supernova has been observed in NGC 3888:

- SN 2015Q (Type Ib, mag. 16) was discovered by American amateur astronomer Patrick Higgins on 17 June 2015.

== See also ==
- List of NGC objects (3001–4000)
