= NGC 1531 =

Galaxy in the constellation Eridanus

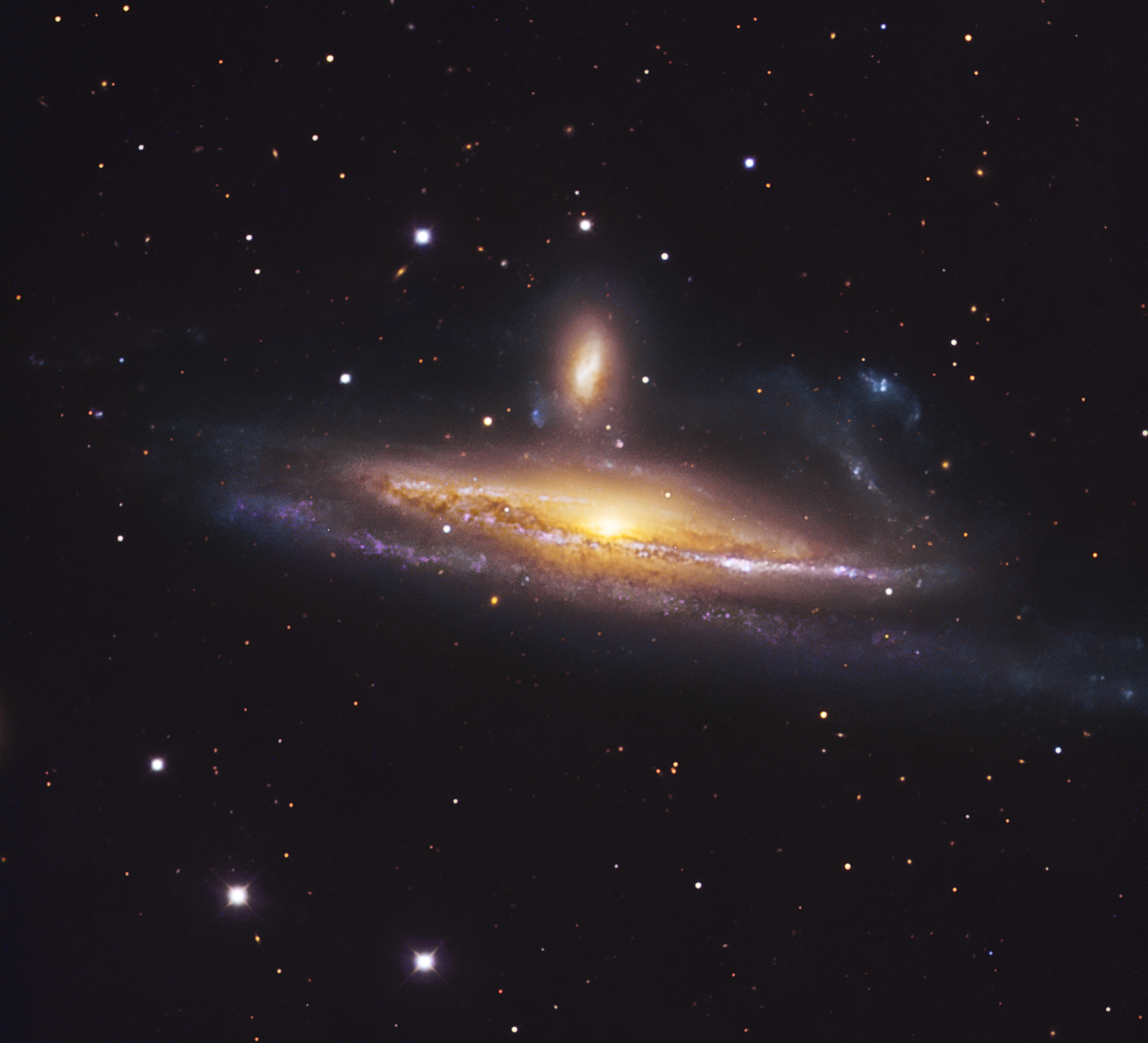
- NGC 1531 (above) with large barred spiral galaxy NGC 1532

Observation data (J2000 epoch)
- Constellation: Eridanus
- Right ascension: 04^{h} 11^{m} 59.3^{s}
- Declination: −32° 51′ 03″
- Redshift: 1169 ± 29 km/s
- Distance: 42.4 million light-years
- Apparent magnitude (V): 12.9

Characteristics
- Type: S0 pec
- Size: 59,200 ly (18.16 kpc)
- Apparent size (V): 1.3′ × 0.9′

Other designations
- PGC 14635

NGC 1531 is a dwarf galaxy in the constellation Eridanus that is interacting with the larger spiral galaxy NGC 1532. It was discovered by John Herschel on 19 October 1835. Although technically classified as a peculiar lenticular galaxy, the galaxy's structure is better described as amorphous.

== See also ==
- NGC 4627 – a similar interacting dwarf galaxy
- M51B – a similar interacting dwarf galaxy
