= NGC 5962 =

Galaxy in the constellation Serpens

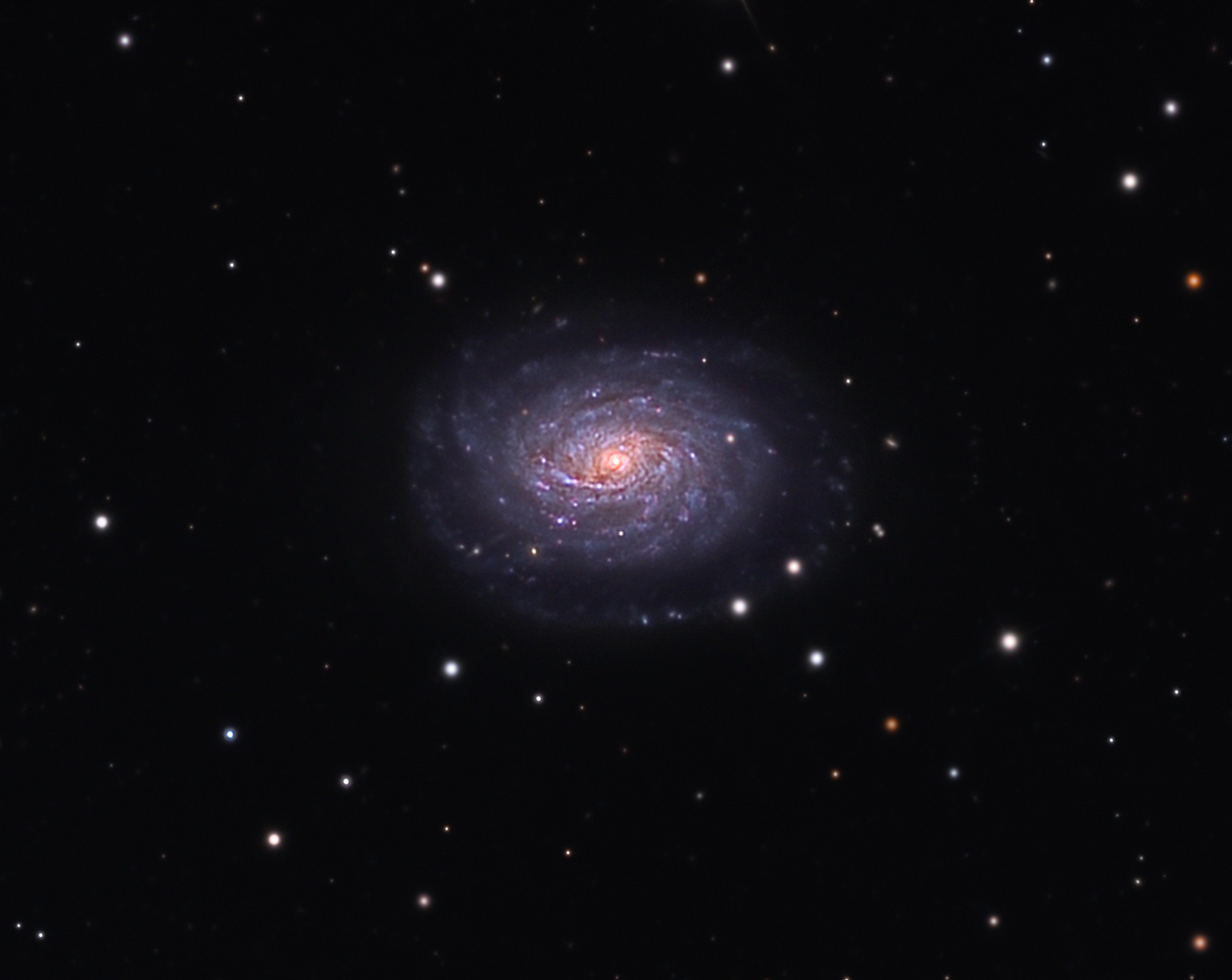
- NGC 5962, 32 inch Schulman Foundation telescope on Mt. Lemmon, AZ

Observation data (J2000 epoch)
- Constellation: Serpens Caput
- Right ascension: 15^{h} 36^{m} 31.681^{s}
- Declination: +16° 36′ 27.93″
- Heliocentric radial velocity: 1,957 km/s
- Distance: 119.5 Mly (36.64 Mpc)
- Group or cluster: NGC 5962/5970 group
- Apparent magnitude (V): 11.34
- Apparent magnitude (B): 11.98

Characteristics
- Type: SAB(rs,nrl)c
- Apparent size (V): 1.490′ × 1.073′ (NIR)

Other designations
- NGC 5962, UGC 9926, LEDA 55588, MCG +03-40-011, PGC 55588

NGC 5962 is a spiral galaxy in the equatorial constellation of Serpens Caput. It was discovered by the Anglo-German astronomer William Herschel on March 21, 1784. The NGC 5962 galaxy is located at a distance of 120 million light years and is receding with a heliocentric radial velocity of 1,957 km/s. It is the brightest member of the eponymously-named NGC 5962 group, which overlaps with the nearby NGC 5970 group; the two groups may be gravitationally bound.

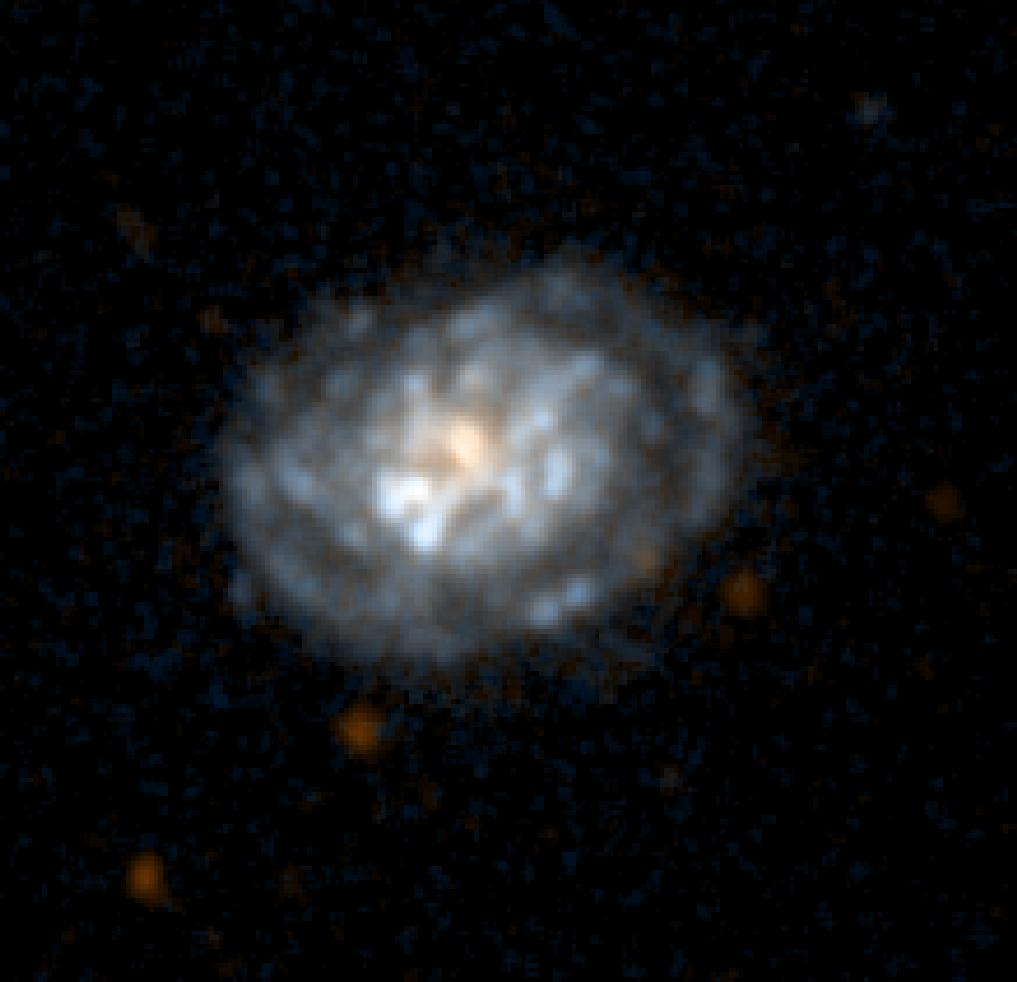
Ultraviolet image of the pseudo-ring structure in the center of the galaxy

The morphological (shape) class of NGC 5962 in the infrared is SAB(rs,nrl)c. This notation indicates the galaxy has a bar structure around the nucleus (SAB), an inner pseudo-ring likely associated with the outer Lindblad resonance (rs), a ring-lens structure at the nucleus (nrl), and loosely-wound spiral arms (c). In the optical band, this galaxy is classed as Hubble type SA(r)c, displaying an inner ring with no visible bar. The galactic plane is inclined at an angle of 45°±2° to the line of sight from the Earth, giving it an oval profile with the major axis aligned along a position angle of 109°±4°.

Along with a populated nucleus, it has a relatively large core, but a small central bulge, in which the spiral arms begin to unfurl. There is some evidence for a low level of nuclear activity, and it has been classed as a nuclear H II region galaxy. Based on its emission of far ultraviolet radiation, the pseudo-ring structure is actively undergoing star formation. The galaxy is forming stars at the rate of 6 M_{☉}·yr^{−1}. There are two confirmed satellite galaxies; a third candidate proved to be too distant based on its redshift value.

== Supernovae ==
Two supernovae have been observed in NGC 5962:

- SN 2016afa (Type II, mag. 17.1) was discovered by Xingming Observatory Sky Survey (XOSS) on 12 February 2016.
- SN 2017ivu (Type II-P, mag. 15.4) was discovered by Kōichi Itagaki on 11 December 2017.
