= SN 2021agco =

Nearest ultra-stripped supernova

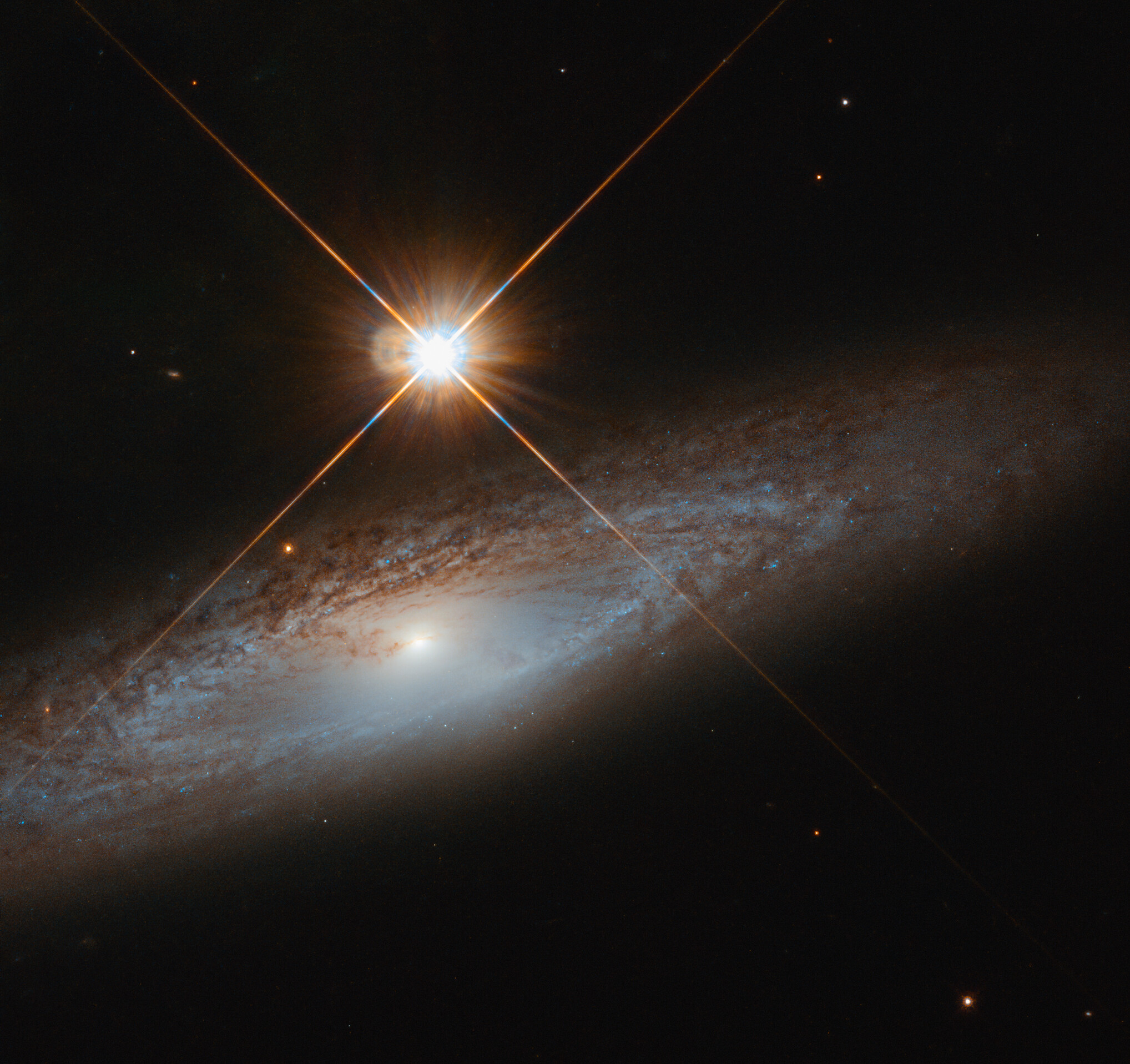
- Image of the host galaxy UGC 3855 captured by the Hubble Space Telescope (HST). The bright object is not a supernova but instead a star in the foreground
- Event type: Supernova
- Ib
- Date: 2021
- Constellation: Lynx
- Right ascension: 04^{h} 45^{m} 50.526^{s}
- Declination: +61° 59′ 33.82″
- Epoch: J2000
- Distance: ~40 mpc
- Redshift: 0.010564
- Host: UGC 3855
- Notable features: closest ultra-stripped supernova
- Total energy output: KE: 9.59×10^{49} ergs; IE: 8.93×10^{49} ergs

SN 2021agco was a Type Ib supernova event located in the spiral galaxy UGC 3855 at a distance of around ~40 Mpc from Earth. It is the closest ultra-stripped supernova (USSN) known. It is known as an ultra-stripped SN due to the progenitor star of SN 2021agco suffered through violent mass loss with the majority of its outer layer being stripped. It was discovered in the year 2021 by a team of astronomers who were led by Shengyu Yan of the Tsinghua University in Beijing, China.

It produced a total kinetic energy of 9.69×10^{49} ergs and an injection energy of 8.93×10^{49} ergs. There was only 0.26 solar masses of supernova ejecta with 2.2×10^{−2} solar masses of nickel-56.

SN 2021agco exist within an unusual environment for Ultra-stripped Supernovas. The host galaxy (UGC 3855) is around 10.6 billion years old making it, and the stellar population it has, relatively old. That, with its low rate of star formation, makes SN 2021agco located in an area where USSN's are not often found.
