= NGC 1532 =

Galaxy in the constellation Eridanus

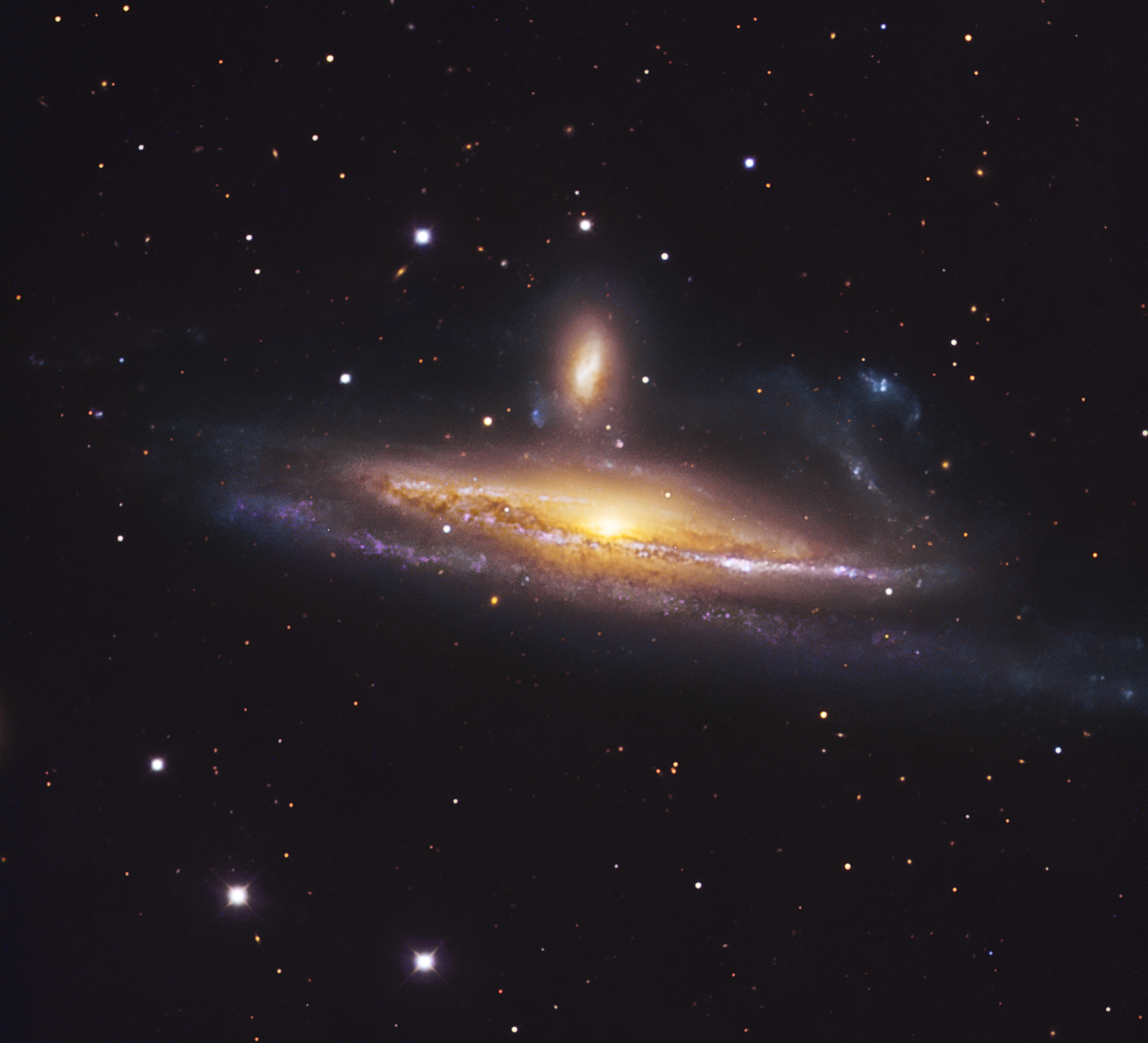
- NGC 1532 with smaller dwarf galaxy NGC 1531 (above)

Observation data (J2000 epoch)
- Constellation: Eridanus
- Right ascension: 04^{h} 12^{m} 04.335^{s}
- Declination: −32° 52′ 26.745″
- Redshift: 0.003468±0.000017
- Heliocentric radial velocity: 1,040±5 km/s
- Distance: 58.34 ± 1.47 Mly (17.887 ± 0.451 Mpc)
- Apparent magnitude (V): 10.65

Characteristics
- Type: SB(s)b pec
- Size: ~373,400 ly (114.47 kpc) (estimated)
- Apparent size (V): 12.6′ × 3.3′

Other designations
- ESO 359- G 027, IRAS F04101-3300, MCG -05-11-002, PGC 14638

NGC 1532, also known as Haley's Coronet, is an edge-on barred spiral galaxy located approximately 58 million light-years from the Solar System in the constellation Eridanus. The galaxy was discovered by James Dunlop on 29 October 1826.

== Bar ==
NGC 1532 is one of many edge-on spiral galaxies that possesses a box-shaped bulge. This is an indication that the bulge is actually a bar. Such bars are easy to detect in face-on galaxies, where the structures can be identified visually. In inclined galaxies such as this one, however, careful analyses are needed to distinguish between bulges and bar structures.

== Companion galaxies and interactions ==
NGC 1532 may possess several dwarf companion galaxies. The galaxy is clearly interacting with one of these galaxies, the amorphous dwarf galaxy NGC 1531. The tidal forces from this interaction have created unusual plumes above the disk of NGC 1532.

NGC 1532 is also an outlying member of the Fornax Cluster.

== Supernovae ==
Three supernovae have been observed in NGC 1532:

- SN 1981A (Type II, mag. 13.5) was discovered by Robert Evans on 24 February 1981.
- SN 2016iae (Type Ic, mag. 17.32) was discovered by ATLAS on 7 November 2016.
- SN 2016ija (Type II, mag. 16.5) was discovered by the Distance Less Than 40 Mpc Survey (DLT40) on 22 November 2016.

== See also ==
- NGC 4631 – an edge-on spiral galaxy also interacting with a dwarf companion.
- List of NGC objects (1001–2000)
