= NGC 940 =

Galaxy in the constellation Triangulum

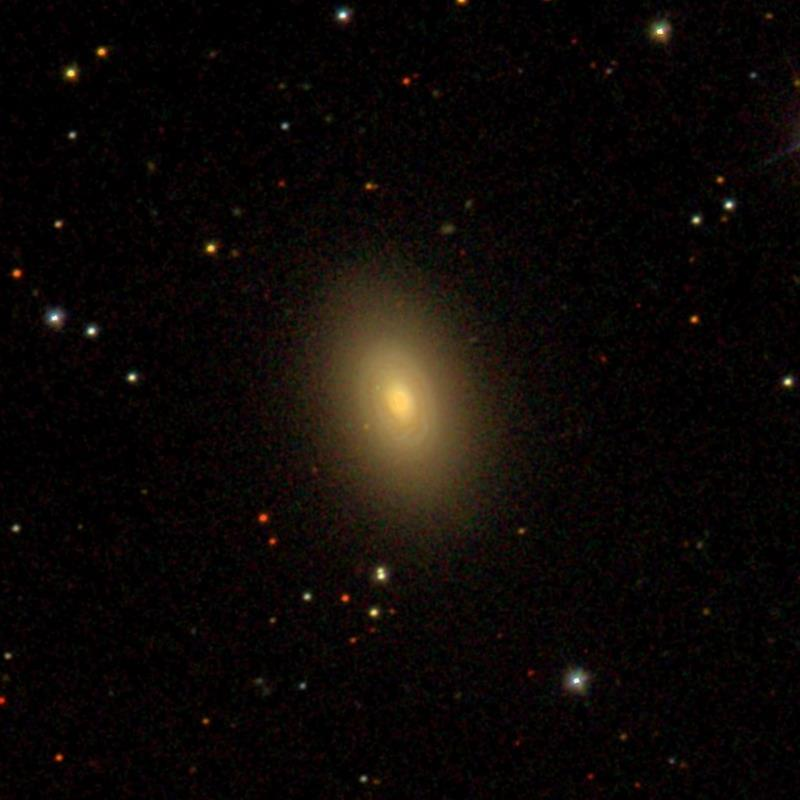
- SDSS image of NGC 940

Observation data (J2000 epoch)
- Constellation: Triangulum
- Right ascension: 02^{h} 29^{m} 27.51472^{s}
- Declination: +31° 38′ 27.5640″
- Redshift: 0.017172
- Heliocentric radial velocity: 5104 km/s
- Distance: 221.6 Mly (67.93 Mpc)
- Apparent magnitude (B): 13.4

Characteristics
- Type: S0

Other designations
- UGC 1964, MCG +05-06-050, PGC 9478

NGC 940 is a lenticular galaxy in the constellation Triangulum. It is estimated to be 222 million light-years from the Milky Way and has a diameter of approximately 80,000 ly. NGC 940 was discovered by German astronomer Heinrich d'Arrest on 26 September 1865.

One supernova has been observed in NGC 940: SN 2021vtl (Type Ia, mag. 17.3) was discovered by Xingming Observatory Sky Survey (XOSS) on 11 August 2021.

== See also ==
- List of NGC objects (1–1000)
