= NGC 1060 =

Galaxy in the constellation Triangulum

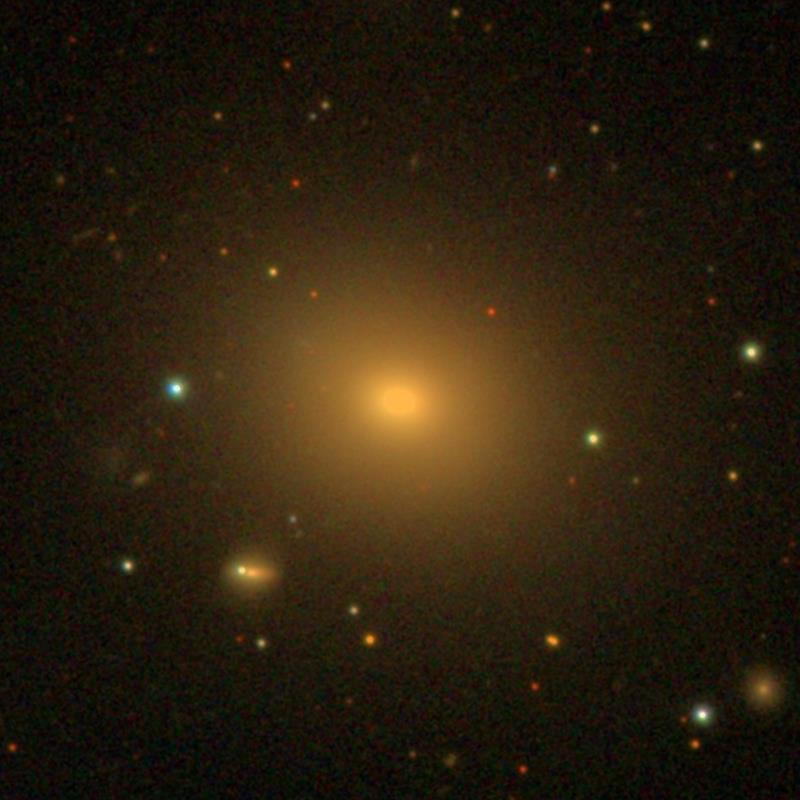
- NGC 1060 (SDSS)

Observation data (J2000.0 epoch)
- Constellation: Triangulum
- Right ascension: 02^{h} 43^{m} 15.05^{s}
- Declination: +32° 25′ 29.90″
- Redshift: 0.017312
- Heliocentric radial velocity: 5190 ± 22 km/s
- Distance: 256 Mly
- Apparent magnitude (V): 12.00
- Apparent magnitude (B): 13.00

Characteristics
- Type: S0
- Apparent size (V): 2.3 x 1.7

Other designations
- PGC 10302, MCG 5-7-35, UGC 2191

NGC 1060 is a lenticular galaxy approximately 256 million light-years away from Earth in the constellation of Triangulum. It was discovered by William Herschel on September 12, 1784.

NGC 1060 is the brightest member of the galaxy group LGG 72, which contains approximately 15 galaxies. Intergalactic medium (IGM) in this system is highly disturbed, with separate X-ray peaks centred on the two main galaxies of the group, NGC 1060 and NGC 1066. A ~250 kpc arc of hot gas is linking these two galaxies. The system appears to be undergoing a merger, which may have triggered the nuclear activity in NGC 1060.

In 2013 a small-scale (20”/7.4 kpc) jet source was detected in NGC 1060, indicating a remnant of an old, low power outburst. The radio emission which arises from this jet was also detected.

NGC 1060 is an active galaxy, with confirmed active galactic nucleus (AGN).

== Supernova SN 2004fd ==
Supernova SN 2004fd of magnitude 15.70 was detected in NGC 1060 on October 22, 2004. It was discovered by Tom Boles who was using 0.35m Schmidt-Cassegrain telescope during searches for the UK Nova/Supernova Patrol. The supernova was classified as type Ia, and was located very close to the nucleus of its host galaxy (the J2000 epoch celestial coordinates: RA 02h 43m 15.20s, Dec +32° 25′ 26.00″).

== See also ==
- List of NGC objects (1001–2000)
