= NGC 5970 =

Barred spiral galaxy in the constellation Serpens

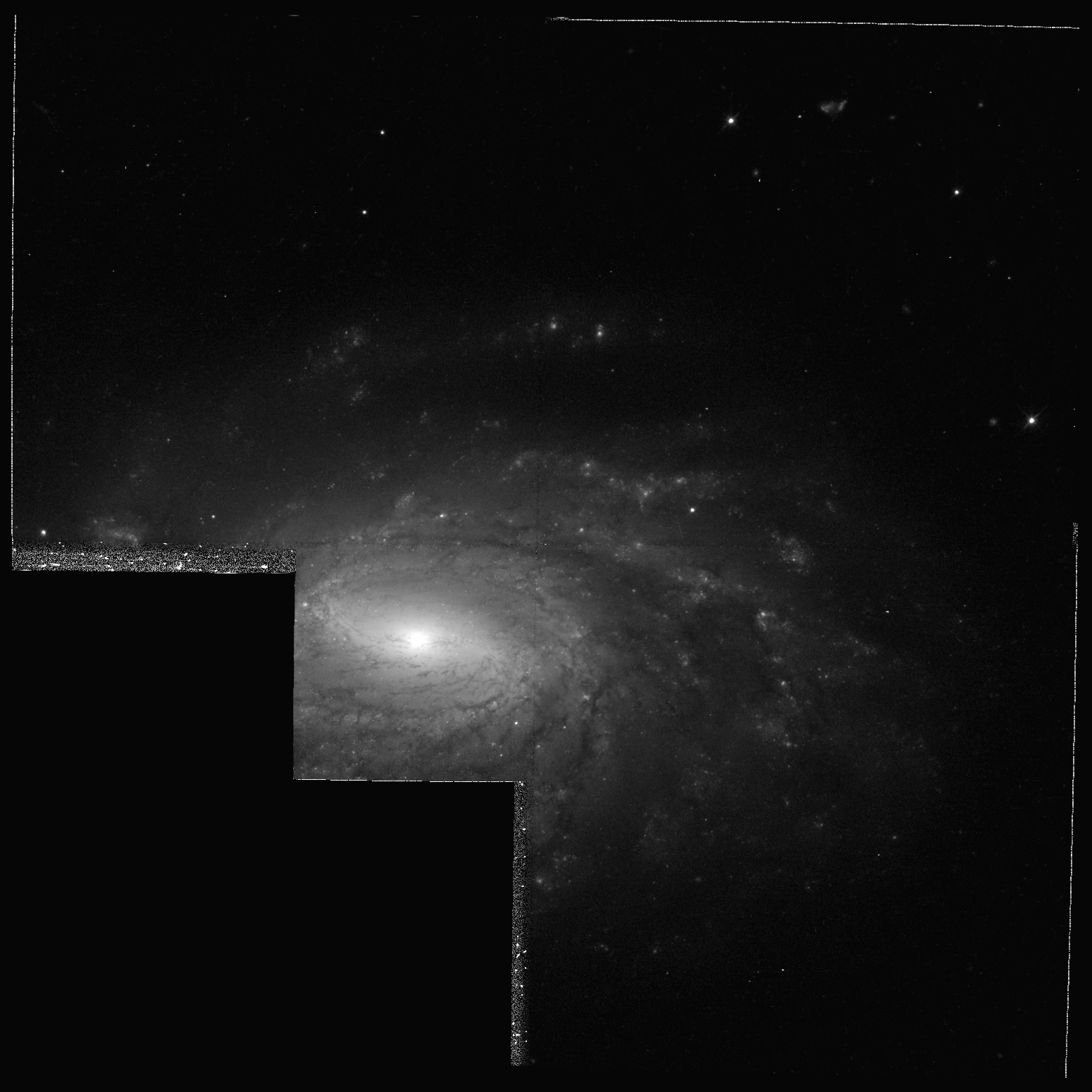
- NGC 5970 imaged by Hubble Space Telescope

Observation data (J2000 epoch)
- Constellation: Serpens Caput
- Right ascension: 15^{h} 38^{m} 29.96^{s}
- Declination: +12° 11′ 11.9″
- Redshift: 0.00661
- Heliocentric radial velocity: 1974 km/s
- Distance: 91.91 ± 0.65 Mly (28.18 ± 0.20 Mpc)
- Apparent magnitude (V): 11.61
- Apparent magnitude (B): 12.00

Characteristics
- Type: SB(r)c

Other designations
- UGC 9943, MCG +02-40-006, PGC 55665

NGC 5970 is a large barred-spiral galaxy located about 90 million light years away in the constellation Serpens Caput. It appears to have two satellite or companion galaxies. It was discovered on March 15, 1784, by the astronomer William Herschel.

LINER-type emission has been detected from the disk of NGC 5970.

== Observations ==
NGC 5970 can be seen 1° southwest of the star Chi Serpentis. A faint halo of dust can be seen around the galaxy's outer spiral arms.
