= Xingming Observatory =

- Observatory code: C42, N86, N88, N89
- Location: Ürümqi, People's Republic of China
- Coordinates: 43°28′15.0″N 87°10′39.6″E
- Altitude: 2,080 m (6,820 ft)
- Established: 2007
- Website: xjltp.china-vo.org

Telescopes
- NEXT: 60cm f/8 Ritchey-Chrétien
- HMT: 50cm f/3.5 reflector
- PSP: 36cm f/6.9 Schmidt–Cassegrain

Xingming Observatory (Chinese: 星明天文台; pinyin: xīng míng tiān wén tái) is a private amateur astronomical observatory located in Gangou Township, Ürümqi, Xinjiang, China. The observatory was founded by amateur astronomer Gao Xing in 2007. The name "Xingming" is chosen partly to commemorate Zhou Xingming, a pioneer of amateur astronomy in China.

As of 2024, discoveries made by Xingming Observatory include 3 comets, 15 asteroids, 90 supernovae, 63 novae, and 111 dwarf novae.

== Research Programs ==
The observatory conducts research in time-domain astronomy and solar system observations in collaboration with professional astronomers. It hosts XOSS (Xingming Observatory Sky Survey), an amateur sky survey that searches for transients, asteroids and comets. Observational data from Xingming Observatory contributed to published astronomy research since 2011.

== Public Outreach ==
The observatory shares a number of telescopes with the public through the XPRO (Xingming Public Remote Observatory) program. It also operates PSP (Popular Supernova Project), a citizen science project for supernovae search, in collaboration with National Astronomical Observatories of China.
