= NGC 5322 =

Galaxy in the constellation Ursa Major

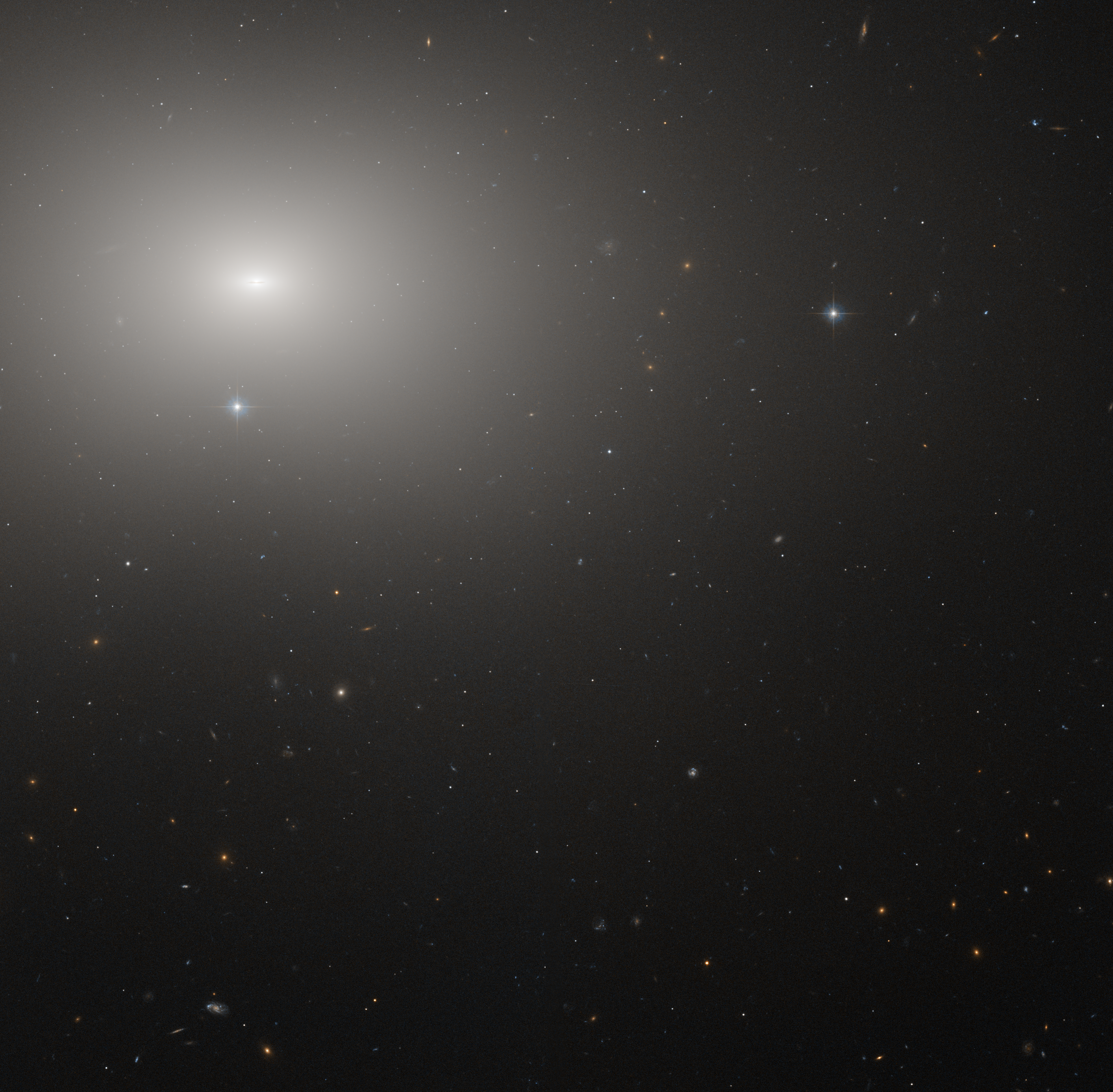
- NGC 5322 by Hubble Space Telescope

Observation data (J2000 epoch)
- Constellation: Ursa Major
- Right ascension: 13^{h} 49^{m} 15.3^{s}
- Declination: +60° 11′ 26″
- Redshift: 0.005937±0.000017
- Heliocentric radial velocity: 1,780 ± 5 km/s
- Distance: 79 ± 22 Mly (24.3 ± 6.9 Mpc)
- Apparent magnitude (V): 10.1

Characteristics
- Type: E3-4
- Apparent size (V): 5.9′ × 3.9′
- Notable features: LINER

Other designations
- UGC 8745, CGCG 295-017, MCG +10-20-035, PGC 49044

NGC 5322 is an elliptical galaxy located in the constellation Ursa Major. It is located at a distance of circa 80 million light years from Earth, which, given its apparent dimensions, means that NGC 5322 is about 140,000 light years across. It was discovered by William Herschel on March 19, 1790.

The galaxy has been found to possess an inner stellar disc and an edge-on nuclear dust disc across the centre, aligned along the major-axis of the galaxy. The stellar disk counter-rotates the galaxy with respect to the spheroid and is believed to be the remnant of a gas-rich satellite. The spheroid has a boxy shape. The galaxy also has an outer halo. In the centre of the galaxy is predicted to lie a supermassive black hole with mass 10^{8.51±0.40} (129–813 million) M_{☉}. Observed in radio waves, NGC 5322 is a weak source and features two symmetric jets emanating from the galactic core and having a linear length of 1.6 kpc. The two jets are nearly perpendicular to the major axis of the galaxy and the circumnuclear dust disk. NGC 5322 is thought to contain a low-luminosity active galactic nucleus (AGN), powered by the accretion of gaseous material. The AGN then creates the radio jets.

NGC 5322 is the foremost galaxy in the NGC 5322 galaxy group, which also includes the galaxies NGC 5372, NGC 5379, and NGC 5389. Further away lie the galaxies NGC 5109, NGC 5205, NGC 5308, NGC 5342, NGC 5376, NGC 5422, NGC 5443, NGC 5475, NGC 5473, NGC 5484, NGC 5485, NGC 5526, NGC 5631, NGC 5667, NGC 5687, and NGC 5678.

== Gallery ==
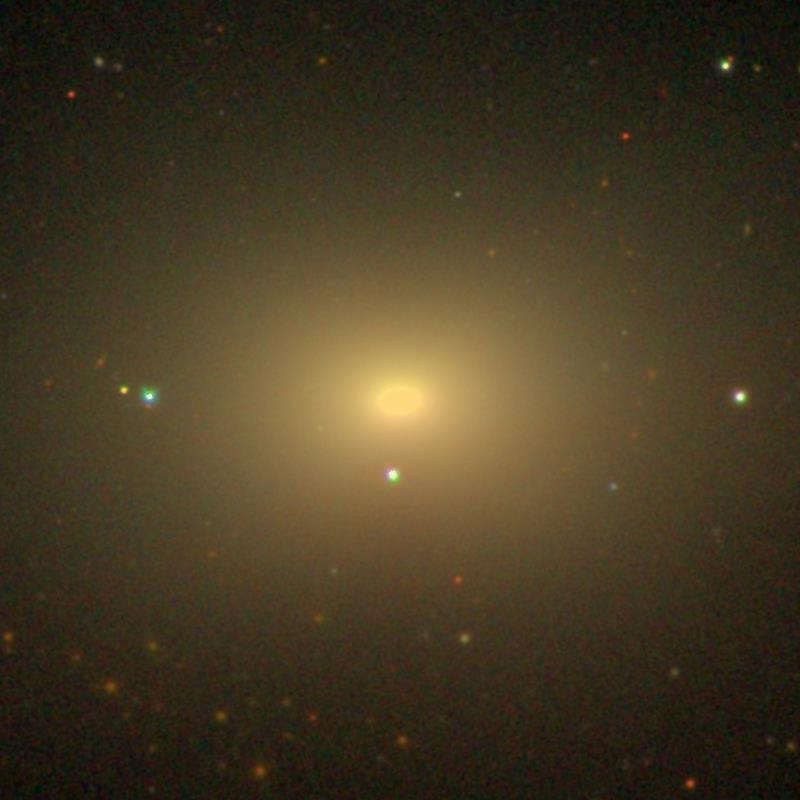
NGC 5322 (SDSS DR14)
