= NGC 5308 =

Edge-on lenticular galaxy in the constellation Ursa Major

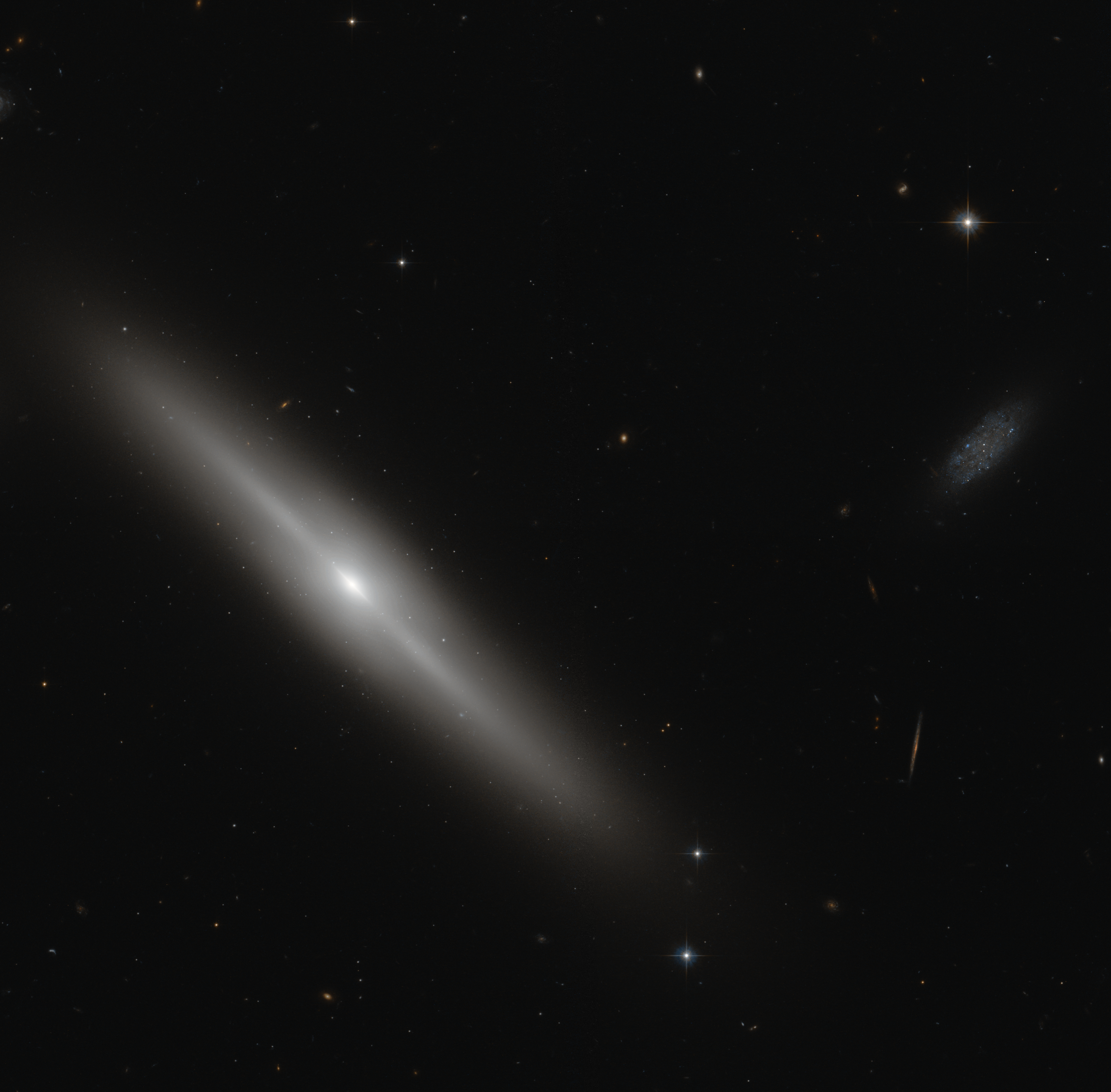
- NGC 5308 imaged by the Hubble Space Telescope, along with LEDA 2802348 (right)

Observation data (J2000 epoch)
- Constellation: Ursa Major
- Right ascension: 13^{h} 47^{m} 00.392^{s}
- Declination: +60° 58′ 22.94″
- Redshift: 0.006665
- Heliocentric radial velocity: 1998 km/s
- Distance: 95.48 ± 16.78 Mly (29.275 ± 5.144 Mpc)
- Group or cluster: NGC 5322 group (LGG 360)
- Apparent magnitude (B): 12.5

Characteristics
- Type: S0^{−}
- Size: 103,200 ly (31,640 pc)
- Apparent size (V): 3.7′ × 0.7′

Other designations
- UGC 8722, PGC 48860, CGCG 295-012

NGC 5308 is an edge-on lenticular galaxy in the constellation of Ursa Major. It was discovered on 19 March 1790 by William Herschel. It was described by John Louis Emil Dreyer as "bright, pretty large" when he compiled the New General Catalogue. A small, irregular galaxy near NGC 5308 has been given the designation LEDA 2802348.

NGC 5308 was imaged by the Hubble Space Telescope in 2016. The galaxy appears to be a flat, smooth disk, typical of most lenticular galaxies. Many large globular clusters orbit the galaxy; these are visible as tiny dots surrounding the galaxy, and are mostly made of old, aging stars similar to the galaxy itself.

== NGC 5322 Group ==
According to A.M. Garcia, the galaxy NGC 5308 is a member of the NGC 5322 group (also known as LGG 360), which contains at least ten other galaxies, including NGC 5322, NGC 5342, NGC 5372, NGC 5376, NGC 5379, NGC 5389, UGC 8684, UGC 8714, and UGC 8716.

== Supernova ==
One supernova has been observed in NGC 5308: SN 1996bk (Type Ia, mag. 14.5) was discovered by Piero Mazza and Stefano Pesci on 12 October 1996, located 10.5" south and 17.9" west of center of the galaxy.

== See also ==
- List of NGC objects (5001–6000)
