= NGC 5422 =

Galaxy in the constellation of Ursa Major

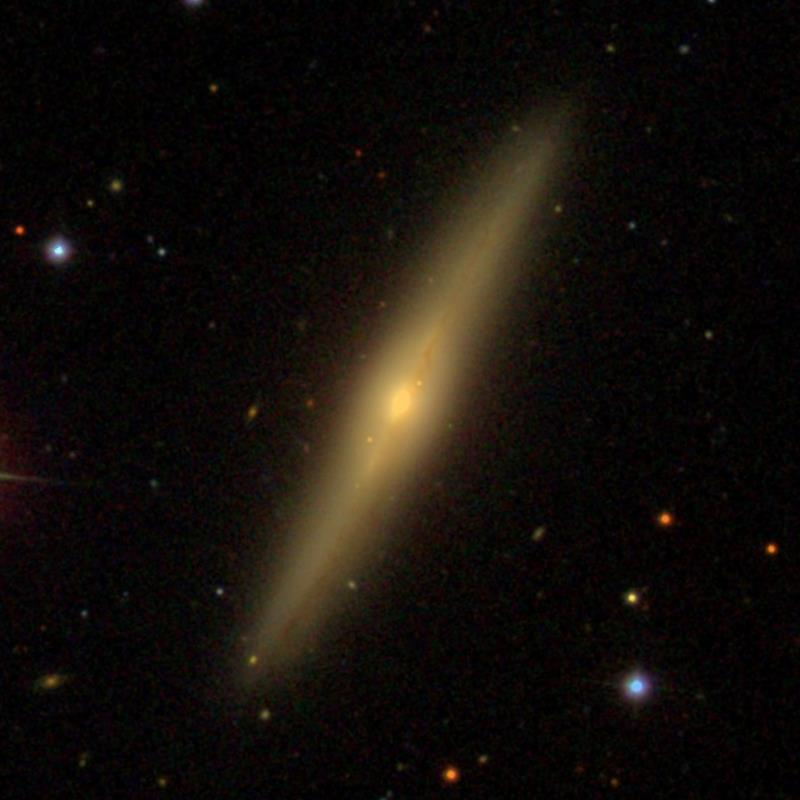
- SDSS image of NGC 5422

Observation data (J2000 epoch)
- Constellation: Ursa Major
- Right ascension: 14^{h} 00^{m} 42.063^{s}
- Declination: +55° 09′ 52.12″
- Redshift: 0.006084
- Heliocentric radial velocity: 1818 ± 46 km/s
- Distance: 101 Mly (30.9 Mpc)
- Group or cluster: NGC 5485 group
- Apparent magnitude (V): 11.80
- Apparent magnitude (B): 12.81

Characteristics
- Type: S0-a

Other designations
- UGC 8935, MCG +09-23-024, PGC 49874

NGC 5422 is a lenticular galaxy located in the constellation Ursa Major. It was discovered on April 14, 1789, by the astronomer William Herschel.

At a distance of about 100 million light-years (30 megaparsecs), NGC 5422 is located within the sparse NGC 5485 group, which is dominated by lenticular galaxies. It has only a single, thick, disk component. Like other galaxies in the group, it has no recent star formation, as its stellar disk is relatively old (about 10 billion years old). Its disk appears similar to the face-on galaxy NGC 6340, but appears edge-on.
