= NGC 5473 =

Galaxy in the constellation Ursa Major

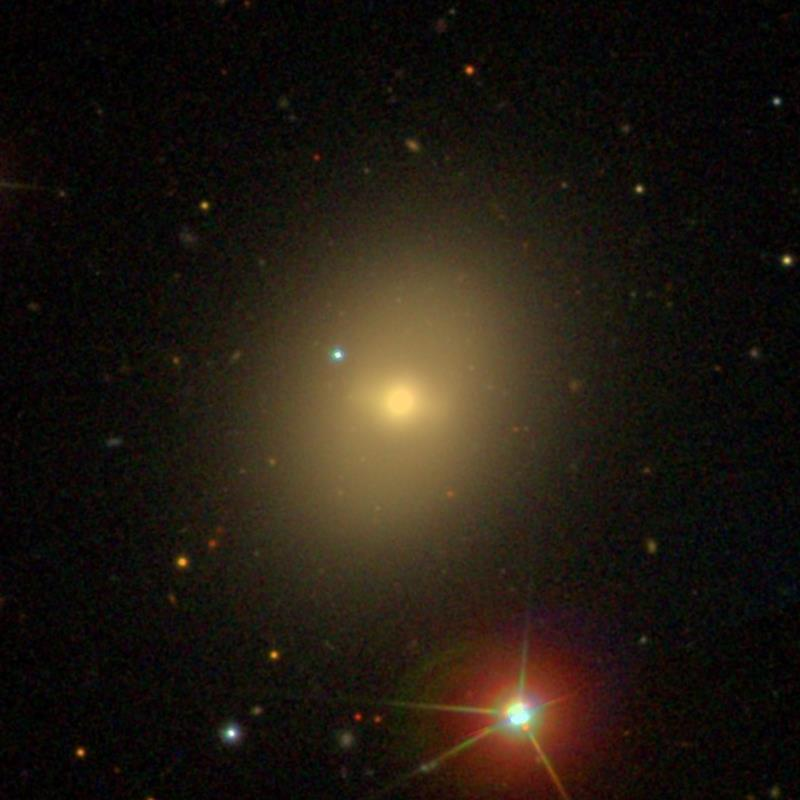
- SDSS image of NGC 5473

Observation data (J2000 epoch)
- Constellation: Ursa Major
- Right ascension: 14^{h} 04^{m} 43.22677^{s}
- Declination: +54° 53′ 33.5103″
- Redshift: 0.006558
- Heliocentric radial velocity: 1960 km/s
- Distance: 85 Mly (26.2 Mpc)
- Apparent magnitude (V): 11.47
- Apparent magnitude (B): 12.37

Characteristics
- Type: SAB0^{−}(s):

Other designations
- UGC 9011, MCG +09-23-031, PGC 50191

NGC 5473 is a lenticular galaxy in the constellation Ursa Major. It was discovered on April 14, 1789, by the astronomer William Herschel. Located roughly 85 million light-years (26.2 megaparsecs) away, it is part of a small galaxy group including NGC 5475 and NGC 5485.
