= NGC 6340 =

Galaxy in the constellation Draco

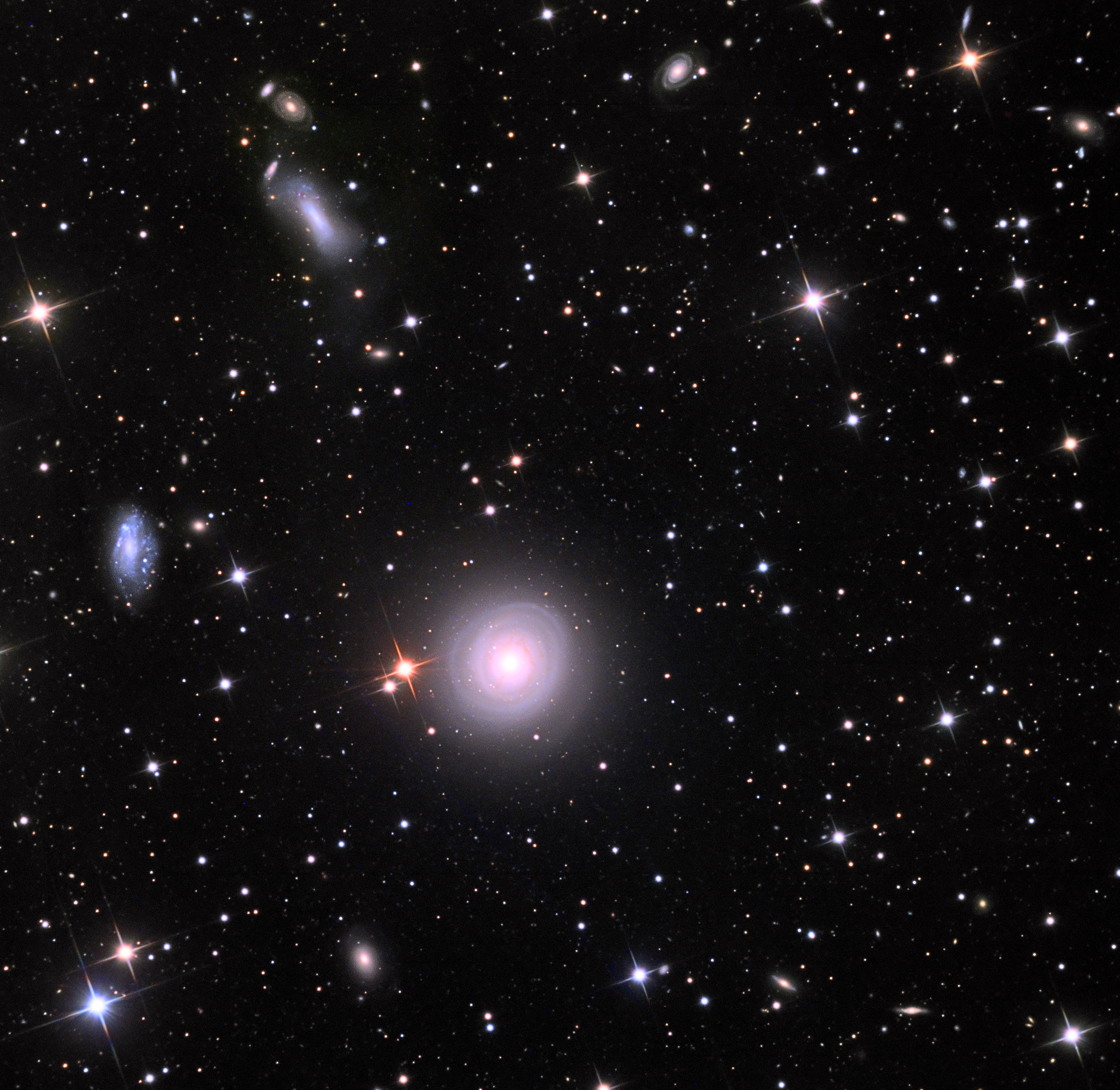
- NGC 6340 (center) in a 32 in (81 cm) telescope

Observation data (J2000 epoch)
- Constellation: Draco
- Right ascension: 17^{h} 10^{m} 24.835^{s}
- Declination: +72° 18′ 15.92″
- Redshift: 0.003996(20)
- Heliocentric radial velocity: 1,217 km/s
- Distance: 55 Mly (17 Mpc)h^{−1}_{0.73}
- Apparent magnitude (V): 11.9

Characteristics
- Type: SA(s)0/a
- Apparent size (V): 3.2′ × 3.0′

Other designations
- NGC 6340, UGC 10762, PGC 59742

NGC 6340 is an unbarred spiral galaxy in the northern constellation of Draco. It was discovered by German-British astronomer William Herschel on June 6, 1788. The galaxy is located approximately 55 million light-years (17 Mpc) away, and is receding with a heliocentric radial velocity of 1,217 km/s. It is the largest member of a triplet of galaxies known as the NGC 6340 group.

The morphological classification of NGC 6340 is SA(s)0/a, indicating a lenticular or spiral galaxy with no central bar (SA), no ring structure (s), and tightly wound spiral arms. It is being viewed nearly face on, with an inclination of about 20° to the plane of the sky. There is a prominent central bulge with little in the way of spiral structure in the outer disk. The nucleus is chemically distinct, having a higher metallicity than the surroundings. There is a polar ring orbiting the nucleus with a radius of about 1.6 kly (0.5 kpc).

Velocity measurements show that there are separate components with the inner and outer parts of the galaxy. This may have been created through a merger of two galaxy, with one possibly elliptical and the other a spiral.
