= NGC 5443 =

Spiral galaxy in Ursa Major

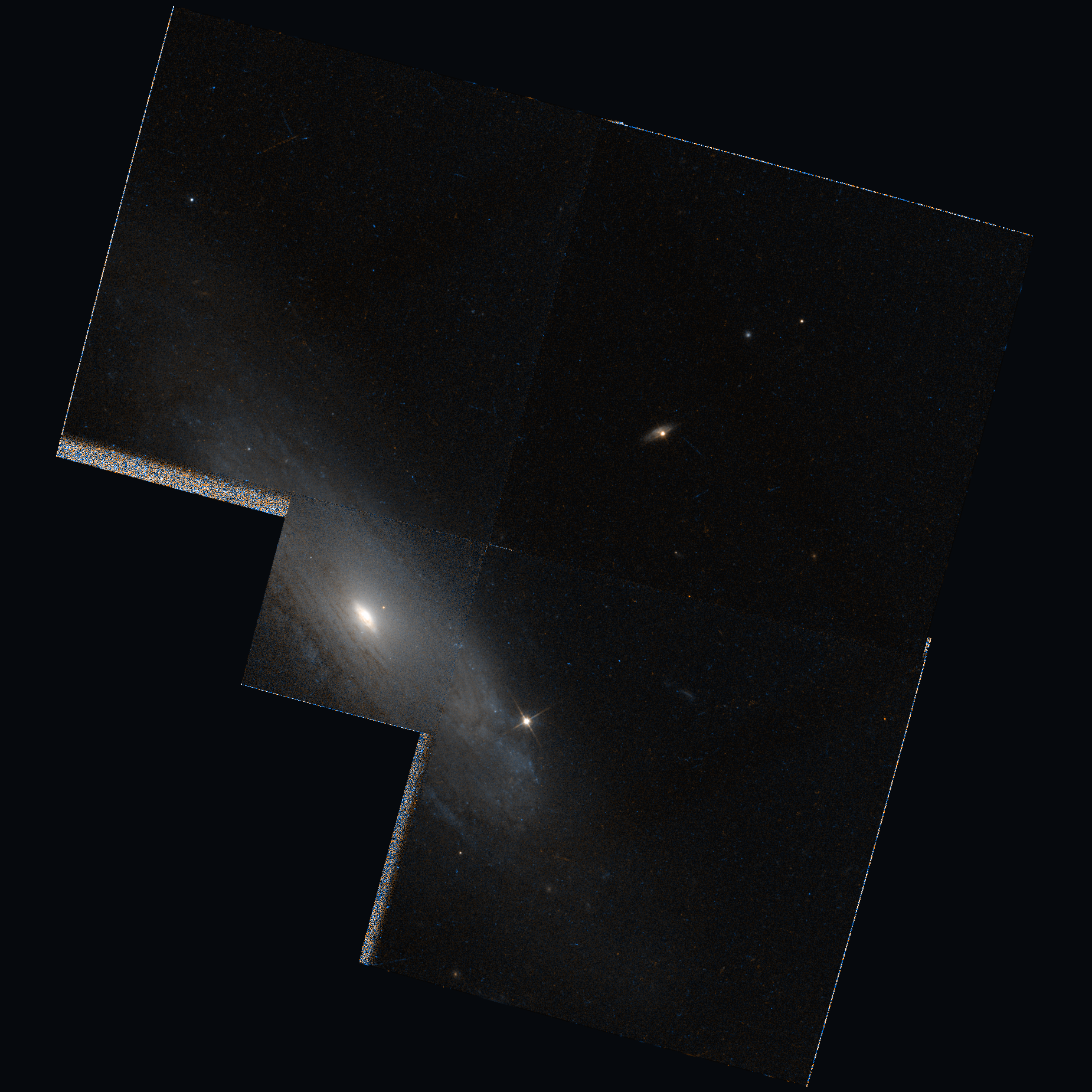
- Hubble Space Telescope image of NGC 5443

Observation data
- Constellation: Ursa Major
- Right ascension: 14^{h} 02^{m} 12^{s}
- Declination: +55° 48′ 50″
- Surface brightness: 22.41 mag/arcsec^{2}

Characteristics
- Type: SAb

NGC 5443 is a spiral galaxy located in the constellation Ursa Major. It was discovered on April 14, 1789 by the astronomer William Herschel. It is also believed to be a Type-II Seyfert galaxy, meaning it contains a bright, active galactic nucleus.
