= NGC 5485 =

Galaxy in the constellation Ursa Major

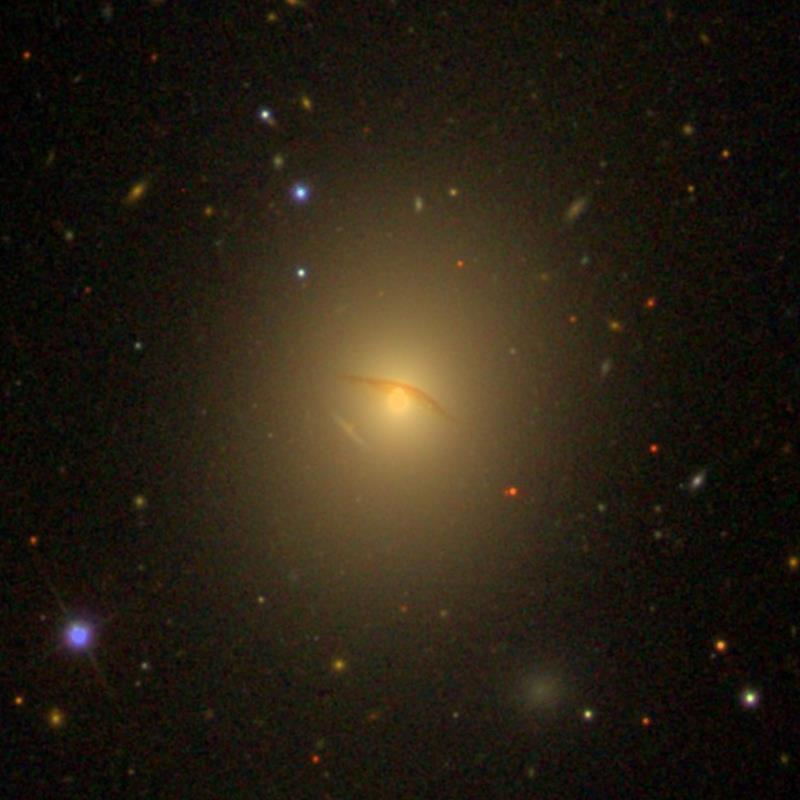
- Image of NGC 5485 by the Sloan Digital Sky Survey

Observation data (J2000 epoch)
- Right ascension: 14^{h} 07^{m} 11.359^{s}
- Declination: 55° 00′ 06.084″
- Redshift: 0.00635
- Apparent magnitude (V): 12.22
- Apparent magnitude (B): 13.82
- Magnitude (J): 9.318
- Magnitude (H): 8.640
- Magnitude (K): 8.402

Characteristics
- Type: Lenticular

NGC 5485 is a lenticular galaxy located in the constellation Ursa Major. It was discovered by William Herschel on April 14, 1789.

== Supernova ==
One supernova has been observed in NGC 5485: SN 1982W (Type I, mag. 15) was discovered by Miklós Lovas on 14 December 1982. The original report had mistakenly identified the host galaxy as NGC 5473, but R. Wood and J. Sinclair at the Royal Greenwich Observatory correctly confirmed the host as NGC 5485.
