= NGC 5342 =

Galaxy in the constellation Ursa Major

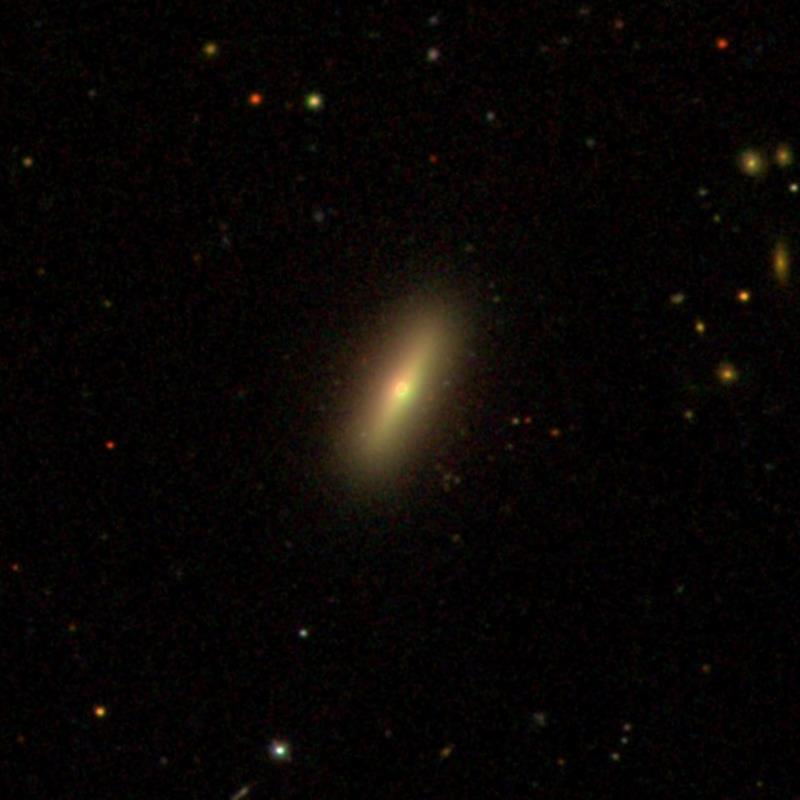

Observation data
- Constellation: Ursa Major
- Right ascension: 13^{h} 52^{m} 17^{s}
- Declination: +59° 44′ 10″

NGC 5342 is a lenticular galaxy located in the constellation Ursa Major. It was discovered on March 19, 1790 by the astronomer William Herschel.
