= NGC 5475 =

Galaxy in the constellation Ursa Major

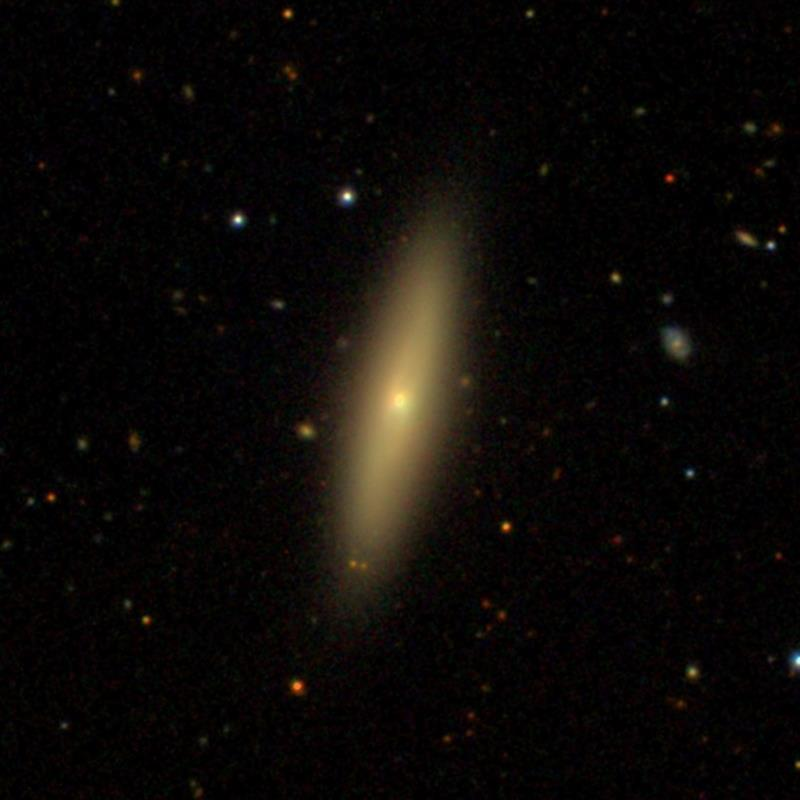

Observation data
- Constellation: Ursa Major
- Right ascension: 14^{h} 05^{m} 12^{s}
- Declination: 55° 44′ 30″

NGC 5475 is a spiral galaxy located in the constellation Ursa Major. It was discovered by the astronomer William Herschel on April 14, 1789 and was observed by John Herschel on April 16, 1828. It has an apparent magnitude of 12.6.
