= NGC 5376 =

Galaxy in the constellation Ursa Major

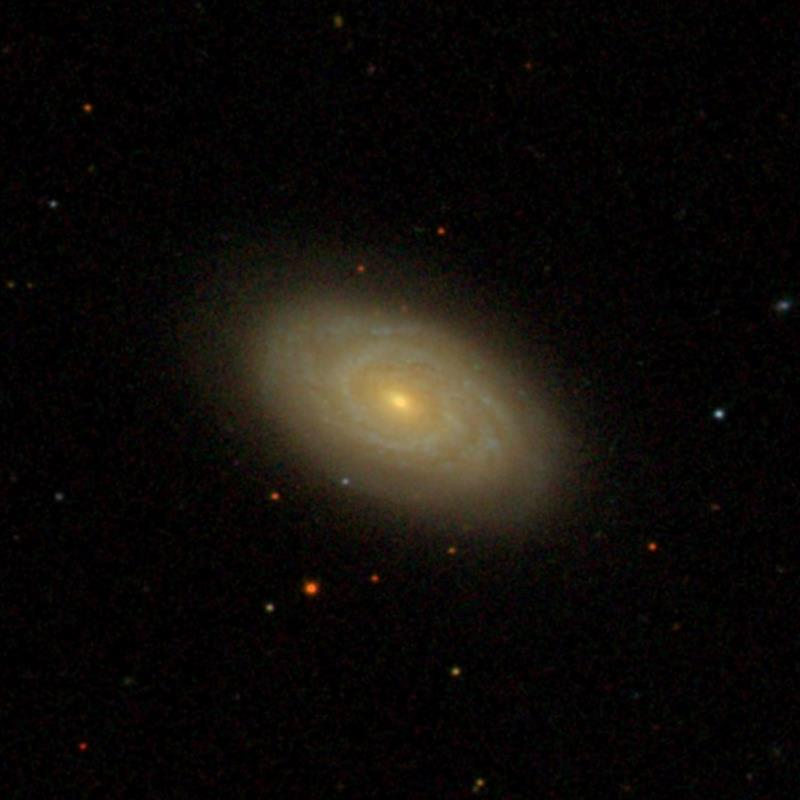

Observation data
- Constellation: Ursa Major
- Right ascension: 13^{h} 56^{m} 07^{s}
- Declination: +59° 22′ 47″

NGC 5376 is an intermediate spiral galaxy located in the constellation Ursa Major. It was discovered on April 24, 1789 by the astronomer William Herschel.
