= List of NGC objects (4001–5000) =

This is a list of NGC objects 4001–5000 from the New General Catalogue (NGC). The astronomical catalogue is composed mainly of star clusters, nebulae, and galaxies. Other objects in the catalogue can be found in the other subpages of the list of NGC objects.

The constellation information in these tables is taken from The Complete New General Catalogue and Index Catalogue of Nebulae and Star Clusters by Jjiko. L. E. Dreyer, which was accessed using the "VizieR Service". Galaxy types are identified using the NASA/IPAC Extragalactic Database. The other data in these tables are from the SIMBAD Astronomical Database unless otherwise stated.

== 4001–4100 ==
NGC number	Other names	Object type	Constellation	Right ascension (J2000)	Declination (J2000)	Apparent magnitude
4002		Lenticular galaxy	Leo	11^{h} 57^{m} 59.3^{s}	23° 12′ 07″	14.96
4003		Barred lenticular galaxy	Leo	11^{h} 57^{m} 59.0^{s}	23° 07′ 30″	14.28
4005		Spiral galaxy	Leo	11^{h} 58^{m} 10.163^{s}	+25° 07′ 20.03″	13.0
4013		Spiral galaxy	Ursa Major	11^{h} 58^{m} 31.4^{s}	+43° 56′ 51″	12.4
4014	NGC 4028	Spiral galaxy	Coma Berenices	11^{h} 58^{m} 35.9^{s}	+16° 10′ 36″	13.5
4015	Arp 138	Interacting galaxies	Coma Berenices	11^{h} 58^{m} 42.5^{s}	+25° 02′ 13″	14.2
4016		Spiral galaxy	Leo	11^{h} 58^{m} 29.2^{s}	+27° 31′ 43″	14.6
4017		Spiral galaxy	Coma Berenices	11^{h} 58^{m} 45.8^{s}	+27° 27′ 08″	13.5
4018		Spiral galaxy	Coma Berenices	11^{h} 58^{m} 31.4^{s}	+43° 56′ 48″	12.4
4019	IC 755	Barred spiral galaxy	Coma Berenices	12^{h} 01^{m} 10.382^{s}	+14° 06′ 16.25″	13.9
4026		Lenticular galaxy	Ursa Major	11^{h} 59^{m} 25.2^{s}	+50° 57′ 42″	10.7
4027		Spiral galaxy	Corvus	11^{h} 59^{m} 27.8^{s}	−19° 16′ 32″	11.7
4028	(Duplicate of NGC 4014)	Spiral galaxy	Coma Berenices	11^{h} 58^{m} 35.9^{s}	+16° 10′ 36″	13.5
4030		Grand design spiral galaxy	Virgo	12^{h} 00^{m} 23.64^{s}	–01° 05′ 59.87″	10.6
4033		Elliptical galaxy	Corvus	12^{h} 00^{m} 34.74^{s}	−17° 50′ 33″	13.18
4036		Lenticular galaxy	Ursa Major	12^{h} 01^{m} 26.89^{s}	+61° 53′ 44.52″	10.66
4038	Antennae Galaxies	Interacting galaxy	Corvus	12^{h} 01^{m} 52.5^{s}	−18° 52′ 03″	11.0
4039	Antennae Galaxies	Interacting galaxy	Corvus	12^{h} 01^{m} 52.5^{s}	−18° 52′ 03″	11.0
4041		Spiral galaxy	Ursa Major	12^{h} 02^{m} 12.17^{s}	+62° 08′ 14.23″	
4045	NGC 4046	Barred spiral galaxy	Virgo	12^{h} 02^{m} 42.2488^{s}	+01° 58′ 36.271″	12.9g
4051		Intermediate spiral galaxy	Ursa Major	12^{h} 03^{m} 09.68^{s}	+44° 31′ 52.54″	12.92
4053		Lenticular galaxy	Coma Berenices	12^{h} 03^{m} 11.6^{s}	19° 43′ 44″	14.6
4055	NGC 4061	Elliptical galaxy	Coma Berenices	12^{h} 04^{m} 01.5^{s}	20° 13′ 56″	14.12
4056		Elliptical galaxy	Coma Berenices	12^{h} 03^{m} 57.8^{s}	10° 18′ 45″	17.68
4057	(Duplicate of NGC 4065)	Elliptical galaxy	Coma Berenices	12^{h} 04^{m} 06.2^{s}	20° 14′ 06″	13.58
4059	(Duplicate of NGC 4070)	Elliptical galaxy	Coma Berenices	12^{h} 04^{m} 11.3^{s}	+20° 24′ 35″	14.14
4060		Lenticular galaxy	Coma Berenices	12^{h} 04^{m} 01.0^{s}	20° 20′ 15″	15.6
4061	(Duplicate of NGC 4055)	Elliptical galaxy	Coma Berenices	12^{h} 04^{m} 01.5^{s}	20° 13′ 56″	14.12
4062		Spiral galaxy	Ursa Major	12^{h} 04^{m} 03.7915^{s}	+31° 53′ 44.765″	11.2
4065	NGC 4057	Elliptical galaxy	Coma Berenices	12^{h} 04^{m} 06.2^{s}	20° 14′ 06″	13.58
4066		Elliptical galaxy	Coma Berenices	12^{h} 04^{m} 09.4^{s}	20° 20′ 53″	13.95
4068	IC 757	Dwarf irregular galaxy	Ursa Major	12^{h} 04^{m} 2.49^{s}	+52° 35′ 26″	
4070	Also listed as NGC 4059	Elliptical galaxy	Coma Berenices	12^{h} 04^{m} 11.3^{s}	+20° 24′ 35″	14.14
4072		Lenticular galaxy	Coma Berenices	12^{h} 04^{m} 13.8^{s}	+20° 12′ 35″	15.6
4074		Peculiar galaxy / Lenticular galaxy	Coma Berenices	12^{h} 04^{m} 29.7^{s}	+20° 18′ 58″	14.5
4076		Spiral galaxy	Coma Berenices	12^{h} 04^{m} 32.5^{s}	+20° 12′ 18″	14.35
4084		Elliptical galaxy	Coma Berenices	12^{h} 05^{m} 15.2^{s}	+21° 12′ 52″	15.4
4086		Lenticular galaxy	Coma Berenices	12^{h} 05^{m} 29.4^{s}	+20° 14′ 48″	14.59
4088		Spiral galaxy	Ursa Major	12^{h} 05^{m} 33.7^{s}	+50° 32′ 23″	11.2
4089		Elliptical galaxy	Coma Berenices	12^{h} 05^{m} 37.4^{s}	20° 33′ 21″	14.65
4090		Spiral galaxy	Coma Berenices	12^{h} 05^{m} 27.9^{s}	20° 18′ 32″	14.85
4091		Spiral galaxy	Coma Berenices	12^{h} 05^{m} 40.1^{s}	20° 33′ 21″	15.2
4092		Spiral galaxy	Coma Berenices	12^{h} 05^{m} 50.1^{s}	20° 28′ 37″	14.19
4093		Elliptical galaxy	Coma Berenices	12^{h} 05^{m} 51.4^{s}	20° 31′ 19″	14.52
4095		Elliptical galaxy	Coma Berenices	12^{h} 05^{m} 54.2^{s}	20° 34′ 21″	14.6
4096		Spiral galaxy	Ursa Major	12^{h} 06^{m} 01.1^{s}	+47° 28′ 43″	10.8
4098	NGC 4099	Interacting galaxies	Coma Berenices	12^{h} 06^{m} 03.9^{s}	20° 36′ 22″	14.5
4099	(Duplicate of NGC 4098)	Interacting galaxies	Coma Berenices	12^{h} 06^{m} 03.9^{s}	20° 36′ 22″	14.5
4100		Spiral galaxy	Ursa Major	12^{h} 06^{m} 08^{s}	+49° 34′ 56″	11.7

== 4101–4200 ==
NGC number	Other names	Object type	Constellation	Right ascension (J2000)	Declination (J2000)	Apparent magnitude
4102		Intermediate barred spiral galaxy	Ursa Major	12^{h} 06^{m} 23.115^{s}	+52° 42′ 39.42″	11.2
4103		Open cluster	Crux	12^{h} 00^{m} 39^{s}	−61° 55′ 00″	7.4
4111		Lenticular galaxy	Canes Venatici	12^{h} 07^{m} 03.1^{s}	43° 03′ 57″	10.7
4117		Lenticular galaxy	Canes Venatici	12^{h} 07^{m} 46.1^{s}	43° 07′ 35″	13.0
4121		Elliptical galaxy	Draco	12^{h} 07^{m} 56.6^{s}	+65° 06′ 50″	14.1
4123		Barred spiral galaxy	Virgo	12^{h} 08^{m} 11.119^{s}	+02° 52′ 41.78″	13.10
4125		Elliptical galaxy	Draco	12^{h} 08^{m} 06.3^{s}	+65° 10′ 27″	10.9
4129	NGC 4130	Barred spiral galaxy	Virgo	12^{h} 08^{m} 53.2828^{s}	−09° 02′ 12.127″	12.5
4130	(Duplicate of NGC 4129)	Barred spiral galaxy	Virgo	12^{h} 08^{m} 53.2828^{s}	−09° 02′ 12.127″	12.5
4136		Barred spiral galaxy	Coma Berenices	12^{h} 09^{m} 17.7147^{s}	+29° 55′ 39.556″	11.1
4138		Lenticular galaxy	Canes Venatici	12^{h} 09^{m} 29.788^{s}	+43° 41′ 07.14″	11.32
4141		Barred spiral galaxy	Ursa Major	12^{h} 09^{m} 47.3208^{s}	+58° 50′ 57.066″	14.6g
4144		Barred spiral galaxy	Ursa Major	12^{h} 09^{m} 58^{s}	+46° 27′ 25″	12.17
4145		Barred spiral galaxy	Canes Venatici	12^{h} 10^{m} 01.52^{s}	39° 53′ 01.9″	11.30
4147		Globular cluster	Coma Berenices	12^{h} 10^{m} 06.149^{s}	+18° 32′ 31.78″	10.74
4150		Elliptical galaxy	Coma Berenices	12^{h} 10^{m} 33^{s}	+30° 25′ 05″	11.64
4151		Spiral galaxy	Canes Venatici	12^{h} 10^{m} 32.7^{s}	+39° 24′ 20″	11.2
4156		Barred spiral galaxy	Canes Venatici	12^{h} 10^{m} 49.6010^{s}	+39° 28′ 22.125″	13.1
4157		Spiral galaxy	Ursa Major	12^{h} 11^{m} 04.4^{s}	+50° 29′ 05″	11.3
4162		Spiral galaxy	Coma Berenices	12^{h} 11^{m} 52.5190^{s}	+24° 07′ 25.346″	12.87
4163	NGC 4167	Irregular galaxy	Canes Venatici	12^{h} 12.9^{m}	36° 10′	14.5
4167	(Duplicate of NGC 4163)	Irregular galaxy	Canes Venatici	12^{h} 12.9^{m}	36° 10′	14.5
4168		Elliptical galaxy	Virgo	12^{h} 12^{m} 17.2685^{s}	+13° 12′ 18.701″	12.4g
4172		Spiral galaxy	Ursa Major	12^{h} 12^{m} 14.9210^{s}	+56° 10′ 39.053″	13.9g
4178		Spiral galaxy	Virgo	12^{h} 12^{m} 47^{s}	+10° 52′ 0″	11.4
4179		Lenticular galaxy	Virgo	12^{h} 12^{m} 52.11142^{s}	+01° 17′ 58.9523″	12.8
4183		Spiral galaxy	Canes Venatici	12^{h} 13^{m} 16.860^{s}	43° 41′ 53.77″	
4185		Spiral galaxy	Coma Berenices	12^{h} 13^{m} 22.2035^{s}	+28° 30′ 39.600″	12.90
4189		Intermediate spiral galaxy	Coma Berenices	12^{h} 13^{m} 47.2668^{s}	+13° 25′ 29.074″	12.5B
4192	Messier 98	Spiral galaxy	Coma Berenices	12^{h} 13^{m} 48.4^{s}	+14° 52′ 58″	11.0
4194	Medusa Merger	Galaxy merger	Ursa Major	12^{h} 14^{m} 09.64^{s}	+54° 31′ 34.60″	13.30
4197		Spiral galaxy	Virgo	12^{h} 14^{m} 38.529^{s}	+05° 48′ 19.95″	12.8
4200		Lenticular galaxy	Virgo	12^{h} 14^{m} 44.225^{s}	+12° 10′ 50.70″	

== 4201–4300 ==
NGC number	Other names	Object type	Constellation	Right ascension (J2000)	Declination (J2000)	Apparent magnitude
4203		Lenticular galaxy	Coma Berenices	12^{h} 15^{m} 05.0^{s}	+33° 11′ 50″	11.99
4206		Spiral galaxy	Virgo	12^{h} 15^{m} 16.8^{s}	13° 01′ 26.4″	12.15
4207		Spiral galaxy	Virgo	12^{h} 15^{m} 30.5^{s}	09° 35′ 06″	13.3
4208	NGC 4212	Flocculent spiral galaxy	Coma Berenices	12^{h} 15^{m} 39.3^{s}	13° 54′ 05″	11.83
4212	(Duplicate of NGC 4208)	Flocculent spiral galaxy	Coma Berenices	12^{h} 15^{m} 39.3^{s}	13° 54′ 05″	11.83
4214	NGC 4228	Irregular galaxy	Canes Venatici	12^{h} 15^{m} 39.2^{s}	+36° 19′ 41″	10.3
4216		Spiral galaxy	Virgo	12^{h} 15^{m} 54.4^{s}	+13° 09′ 00″	11.2
4217		Spiral galaxy	Canes Venatici	12^{h} 15^{m} 50.900^{s}	+47° 05′ 30.44″	12.4
4219		Spiral galaxy	Centaurus	12^{h} 16^{m} 27.3732^{s}	−43° 19′ 26.839″	12.71
4220		Lenticular galaxy	Canes Venatici	12^{h} 16^{m} 11.7292^{s}	47° 53′ 00.352″	12.4
4221		Barred lenticular galaxy	Draco	12^{h} 15^{m} 59.860^{s}	+66° 13′ 50.90″	13.6
4222		Spiral galaxy	Coma Berenices	12^{h} 16^{m} 22.5^{s}	13° 18′ 25″	13.86
4228	(Duplicate of NGC 4214)	Irregular galaxy	Canes Venatici	12^{h} 15^{m} 39.2^{s}	+36° 19′ 41″	10.3
4230		Open cluster	Centaurus	12^{h} 17^{m} 09.4^{s}	−55° 17′ 10″	9.0
4236		Spiral galaxy	Draco	12^{h} 16^{m} 41.8^{s}	+69° 28′ 10″	10.7
4237		Flocculent spiral galaxy	Coma Berenices	12^{h} 17^{m} 11.4^{s}	15° 19′ 26″	12.4
4242		Spiral galaxy	Canes Venatici	12^{h} 17^{m} 30.174^{s}	+45° 37′ 09.46″	11.37
4244		Spiral galaxy	Canes Venatici	12^{h} 17^{m} 30.1^{s}	+37° 48′ 30″	10.2
4245		Lenticular galaxy	Coma Berenices	12^{h} 17^{m} 36.78283^{s}	+29° 36′ 28.9010″	11.42
4246	IC 3113	Spiral galaxy	Virgo	12^{h} 17^{m} 58.1131^{s}	+07° 11′ 09.376″	12.7
4252		Spiral galaxy	Virgo	12^{h} 18^{m} 30.9^{s}	+05° 33′ 34.1″	14.1
4253		Barred spiral galaxy	Coma Berenices	12^{h} 18^{m} 26.5^{s}	+29° 48′ 46″	13.5
4254	Messier 99	Spiral galaxy	Coma Berenices	12^{h} 18^{m} 49.6^{s}	+14° 25′ 00″	10.2
4256		Spiral Galaxy	Draco	2^{h} 18^{m} 43.0813^{s}	65° 53′ 53.788″	12.1
4258	Messier 106	Spiral galaxy	Canes Venatici	12^{h} 18^{m} 57.5^{s}	+47° 18′ 14″	9.6
4260		Barred spiral galaxy	Virgo	12^{h} 19^{m} 22^{s}	+06° 05′ 55″	13.1
4261		Elliptical galaxy	Virgo	12^{h} 19^{m} 23.2^{s}	+05° 49′ 30″	10.4
4262		Barred lenticular galaxy	Coma Berenices	12^{h} 19^{m} 30.6^{s}	+14° 52′ 40″	12.49
4267		Barred lenticular galaxy	Virgo	12^{h} 19^{m} 45.2^{s}	12° 47′ 54″	11.86
4273		Spiral galaxy	Virgo	12^{h} 19^{m} 56.0407^{s}	+05° 20′ 36.497″	11.9
4274		Barred spiral galaxy	Coma Berenices	12^{h} 19^{m} 50.6^{s}	29° 36′ 52″	10.4
4277		Intermediate spiral galaxy	Virgo	12^{h} 20^{m} 03.7208^{s}	+05° 20′ 28.904″	14.2g
4278		Elliptical galaxy	Coma Berenices	12^{h} 20^{m} 06.8^{s}	+29° 16′ 51″	10.2
4293		Lenticular galaxy	Coma Berenices	12^{h} 21^{m} 12.891^{s}	+18° 22′ 56.64″	10.4
4294		Barred spiral galaxy	Virgo	12^{h} 21^{m} 17.8^{s}	11° 30′ 38″	12.5
4296		Barred lenticular galaxy	Virgo	12^{h} 21^{m} 28.4^{s}	06° 39′ 13″	13.66
4297		Lenticular galaxy	Virgo	12^{h} 21^{m} 27.4^{s}	06° 40′ 16″	15.7
4298		Flocculent spiral galaxy	Coma Berenices	12^{h} 21^{m} 32.7^{s}	14° 36′ 22″	12.5
4299		Spiral galaxy	Virgo	12^{h} 21^{m} 40.5^{s}	11° 30′ 00″	12.88

== 4301–4400 ==
NGC number	Other names	Object type	Constellation	Right ascension (J2000)	Declination (J2000)	Apparent magnitude
4301	NGC 4303A	Barred spiral galaxy	Virgo	12^{h} 22^{m} 27.1969^{s}	+04° 33′ 58.361″	12.5
4302		Spiral galaxy	Coma Berenices	12^{h} 21^{m} 42.5^{s}	14° 35′ 54″	13.6
4303	Messier 61	Spiral galaxy	Virgo	12^{h} 21^{m} 55.0^{s}	+04° 28′ 29″	10.9
4305		Dwarf spiral galaxy	Virgo	12^{h} 22^{m} 03.6^{s}	12° 44′ 27″	13.4
4306		Dwarf barred lenticular galaxy	Virgo	12^{h} 22^{m} 04.1^{s}	12° 47′ 15″	13.8
4307		Spiral galaxy	Virgo	12^{h} 22^{m} 05.7^{s}	09° 02′ 37″	13.0
4308		Elliptical galaxy	Coma Berenices	12^{h} 21^{m} 56.9^{s}	+30° 04′ 27″	14.3
4309		Lenticular galaxy	Virgo	12^{h} 22^{m} 12.4^{s}	+07° 08′ 38″	14.3
4310	NGC 4338	Dwarf spiral galaxy	Coma Berenices	12^{h} 22^{m} 26.3^{s}	29° 12′ 33″	13.22
4312		Unbarred spiral galaxy	Coma Berenices	12^{h} 22^{m} 31.3^{s}	15° 32′ 17″	12.53
4313		Spiral galaxy	Virgo	12^{h} 22^{m} 38.5^{s}	11° 48′ 03″	12.5
4314		Spiral galaxy	Coma Berenices	12^{h} 22^{m} 32.0^{s}	+29° 53′ 44″	11.5
4316		Spiral galaxy	Virgo	12^{h} 22^{m} 42.2^{s}	09° 19′ 57″	13.5
4318		Lenticular galaxy	Virgo	12^{h} 22^{m} 43.3^{s}	08° 11′ 54″	13.8
4319	NGC 4345	Spiral galaxy	Draco	12^{h} 21^{m} 44.1^{s}	+75° 19′ 21″	13.0
4320		Peculiar galaxy	Virgo	12^{h} 22^{m} 57.7^{s}	10° 32′ 54″	15.3
4321	Messier 100	Spiral galaxy	Coma Berenices	12^{h} 22^{m} 55.0^{s}	+15° 49′ 20″	10.6
4323		Lenticular or dwarf elliptical galaxy	Coma Berenices	12^{h} 23^{m} 01.7^{s}	15° 54′ 20″	15.1
4324		Lenticular galaxy	Virgo	12^{h} 23^{m} 06.2^{s}	05° 15′ 01″	12.51
4325	NGC 4368	Elliptical galaxy	Virgo	12^{h} 23^{m} 06.6812^{s}	+10° 37′ 16.288″	14.2
4326		Barred spiral galaxy	Virgo	12^{h} 23^{m} 11.6^{s}	06° 04′ 20″	14.19
4328		Dwarf elliptical or lenticular galaxy	Coma Berenices	12^{h} 23^{m} 20.0^{s}	15° 49′ 13″	14.3
4329		Elliptical galaxy	Corvus	12^{h} 23^{m} 20.7^{s}	−12° 33′ 31″	14.5
4330		Spiral galaxy	Virgo	12^{h} 23^{m} 17.2512^{s}	+11° 22′ 04.692″	12.4
4331		Irregular galaxy	Draco	12^{h} 22^{m} 35.9^{s}	76° 10′ 21″	14.64
4332		Barred spiral galaxy	Draco	12^{h} 22^{m} 46.7^{s}	65° 50′ 38″	13.3
4333		Barred spiral galaxy	Virgo	12^{h} 23^{m} 22.3^{s}	06° 02′ 27″	14.48
4335		Elliptical galaxy	Ursa Major	12^{h} 23^{m} 01.8985^{s}	+58° 26′ 40.432″	13.40
4338	(Duplicate of NGC 4310)	Dwarf spiral galaxy	Coma Berenices	12^{h} 22^{m} 26.3^{s}	29° 12′ 33″	13.22
4340		Double-barred lenticular galaxy	Coma Berenices	12^{h} 23^{m} 35.3^{s}	16° 43′ 20″	12.10
4343		Unbarred spiral galaxy	Virgo	12^{h} 23^{m} 38.69184^{s}	06° 57′ 14.7024″	12.29
4345	(Duplicate of NGC 4319)	Spiral galaxy	Draco	12^{h} 21^{m} 44.1^{s}	+75° 19′ 21″	13.0
4349		Open cluster	Crux	12^{h} 24^{m} 08^{s}	−61° 52′ 18″	7.4
4359		Dwarf barred spiral galaxy	Coma Berenices	12^{h} 24^{m} 11.2^{s}	31° 31′ 19″	13.6
4361	Lawn Sprinkler Nebula; Garden Sprinkler Nebula	Planetary nebula	Corvus	12^{h} 24^{m} 24.8^{s}	−18° 47′ 5.6″	10.9
4363		Spiral galaxy	Draco	12^{h} 23^{m} 28.4^{s}	+74° 57′ 08.0″	13.5
4365		Elliptical galaxy	Virgo	12^{h} 24^{m} 28.228^{s}	+07° 19′ 03.07″	11.5
4368	(Duplicate of NGC 4325)	Elliptical galaxy	Virgo	12^{h} 23^{m} 06.6812^{s}	+10° 37′ 16.288″	14.2
4372	Caldwell 108	Globular cluster	Musca	12^{h} 25^{m} 45.43^{s}	−72° 39′ 32.7″	9.85
4374	Messier 84	Elliptical galaxy	Virgo	12^{h} 25^{m} 03.7^{s}	+12° 53′ 13″	10.8
4375		Barred spiral galaxy	Coma Berenices	12^{h} 25^{m} 00.4734^{s}	+28° 33′ 30.952″	12.6
4378		Spiral galaxy	Virgo	12^{h} 25^{m} 00.4734^{s}	+28° 33′ 30.952″	12.6
4380		Unbarred spiral galaxy	Virgo	12^{h} 25^{m} 18.1071^{s}	+04° 55′ 30.524″}	12.63
4382	Messier 85	Lenticular galaxy	Coma Berenices	12^{h} 25^{m} 24.2^{s}	+18° 11′ 27″	10.2
4383		Spiral galaxy	Coma Berenices	12^{h} 25^{m} 25.5^{s}	16° 28′ 12″	12.12
4388		Spiral galaxy	Virgo	12^{h} 25^{m} 46.820^{s}	+12° 39′ 43.45″	11.02
4393		Spiral galaxy	Coma Berenices	12^{h} 25^{m} 51.2^{s}	27° 33′ 42″	12.7
4394		Barred spiral galaxy	Coma Berenices	12^{h} 25^{m} 55.624^{s}	+18° 12′ 50.13″	10.9
4395	NGC 4399; NGC 4400; NGC 4401	Spiral galaxy	Canes Venatici	12^{h} 25^{m} 48.9^{s}	+33° 32′ 48″	11.7
4399	(Duplicate NGC 4395)	Spiral galaxy	Canes Venatici	12^{h} 25^{m} 48.9^{s}	+33° 32′ 48″	11.7
4400	(Duplicate of NGC 4395)	Spiral galaxy	Canes Venatici	12^{h} 25^{m} 48.9^{s}	+33° 32′ 48″	11.7

== 4401–4500 ==
NGC number	Other names	Object type	Constellation	Right ascension (J2000)	Declination (J2000)	Apparent magnitude
4401	(Duplicate of NGC 4395)	Spiral galaxy	Canes Venatici	12^{h} 25^{m} 48.9^{s}	+33° 32′ 48″	11.7
4402		Spiral galaxy	Virgo	12^{h} 26^{m} 07.566^{s}	+13° 06′ 46.06″	12.55
4406	Messier 86	Lenticular galaxy /Elliptical galaxy	Virgo	12^{h} 26^{m} 12.2^{s}	+12° 56′ 45″	10.9
4411	NGC 4411A	Barred spiral galaxy	Virgo	12^{h} 26^{m} 29.9337^{s}	+08° 52′ 19.121″	13.41
4414		Spiral galaxy	Coma Berenices	12^{h} 26^{m} 27.1^{s}	+31° 13′ 21″	10.9
4415		Lenticular galaxy	Virgo	12^{h} 26^{m} 40.5369^{s}	+08° 26′ 08.868″	13.8
4419		Barred spiral galaxy	Coma Berenices	12^{h} 26^{m} 56.4494^{s}	+15° 02′ 50.861″	12.2g
4420		Unbarred spiral galaxy	Virgo	12^{h} 26^{m} 58.50^{s}	+02° 29′ 35.0″	17.9
4424		Spiral galaxy	Virgo	12^{h} 27^{m} 11.575^{s}	+09° 25′ 14.32″	
4429		Lenticular galaxy	Virgo	12^{h} 27^{m} 26.5^{s}	11° 06′ 28″	11.02
4435	Eyes Galaxies	Lenticular galaxy	Virgo	12^{h} 27^{m} 40.6^{s}	+13° 04′ 44″	11.9
4436		Lenticular or dwarf elliptical galaxy	Virgo	12^{h} 27^{m} 41.2^{s}	12° 18′ 57″	14.0
4437	Also listed as NGC 4517	Spiral galaxy	Virgo	12^{h} 32^{m} 45.586^{s}	+00° 06′ 54.14″	12.4
4438	Eyes Galaxies	Spiral galaxy	Virgo	12^{h} 27^{m} 45.9^{s}	+13° 00′ 32″	12.0
4441		Lenticular galaxy	Draco	12^{h} 27^{m} 20.3315^{s}	+64° 48′ 06.253″	13.5g
4443	(Duplicate of NGC 4461)	Lenticular galaxy	Virgo	12^{h} 29^{m} 03.0^{s}	13° 11′ 02″	12.09
4444		Intermediate spiral galaxy	Centaurus	12^{h} 28^{m} 36.39^{s}	−43° 15′ 42.35″	
4448		Spiral galaxy	Coma Berenices	12^{h} 28^{m} 15.2^{s}	+28° 37′ 16″	11.9
4449		Irregular galaxy	Canes Venatici	12^{h} 28^{m} 11.0^{s}	+44° 05′ 33.4″	10.0
4450		Spiral galaxy	Coma Berenices	12^{h} 28^{m} 29.6^{s}	+17° 05′ 05″	11.2
4451		Spiral galaxy	Virgo	12^{h} 28^{m} 40.558^{s}	09° 15′ 32.13″	13.29
4452		Lenticular galaxy	Virgo	12^{h} 28.7^{m} 00^{s}	+11° 45′ 00″	12.4
4453		Spiral galaxy	Virgo	12^{h} 28^{m} 46.8456^{s}	+06° 30′ 43.138″	15.68
4454		Barred spiral galaxy	Virgo	12^{h} 28^{m} 50.7^{s}	−01° 56′ 21″	13.2
4455		Spiral galaxy	Coma Berenices	12^{h} 28^{m} 44.1266093618^{s}	+22° 49′ 13.542101138″	15.5
4457		Intermediate spiral galaxy	Virgo	12^{h} 28^{m} 59.0^{s}	03° 34′ 14″	11.76
4458		Elliptical galaxy	Virgo	12^{h} 28^{m} 57.5^{s}	13° 24′ 31″	12.93
4459		Lenticular galaxy	Coma Berenices	12^{h} 29^{m} 00.0^{s}	13° 58′ 42″	11.32
4461	NGC 4443	Lenticular galaxy	Virgo	12^{h} 29^{m} 03.0^{s}	13° 11′ 02″	12.09
4463		Open cluster	Musca	12^{h} 30^{m}	−64° 47′	7.6
4464		Elliptical galaxy	Virgo	12^{h} 29^{m} 21.3^{s}	08° 09′ 24″	13.46
4466		Spiral galaxy	Virgo	12^{h} 29^{m} 30.6^{s}	07° 41′ 47″	14.2
4467		Elliptical galaxy	Virgo	12^{h} 29^{m} 30.2^{s}	07° 59′ 34″	14.8
4468		Dwarf elliptical galaxy	Coma Berenices	12^{h} 29^{m} 30.9^{s}	14° 02′ 57″	13.7
4469		Spiral galaxy	Virgo	12^{h} 29^{m} 28.0^{s}	08° 45′ 00″	12.0
4470	NGC 4610	Spiral galaxy	Virgo	12^{h} 19^{m} 37.7893^{s}	+07° 49′ 27.624″	12.2
4472	Messier 49	Elliptical galaxy	Virgo	12^{h} 29^{m} 46.7^{s}	+08° 00′ 02″	8.4
4473		Elliptical galaxy	Coma Berenices	12^{h} 29^{m} 48.9^{s}	13° 25′ 46″	11.16
4474		Lenticular galaxy	Coma Berenices	12^{h} 29^{m} 53.5^{s}	14° 04′ 07″	12.5
4475		Spiral galaxy	Coma Berenices	12^{h} 29^{m} 47.5825^{s}	+27° 14′ 36.039″	14.3
4476		Lenticular galaxy	Virgo	12^{h} 29^{m} 59.1^{s}	12° 20′ 55″	13.0
4477		Barred lenticular galaxy	Coma Berenices	12^{h} 30^{m} 02.2^{s}	13° 38′ 12″	11.38
4478		Elliptical galaxy	Virgo	12^{h} 30^{m} 17.4^{s}	+12° 19′ 43″	12.36
4479		Barred lenticular galaxy	Coma Berenices	12^{h} 30^{m} 18.4^{s}	13° 34′ 40″	13.4
4482		Dwarf elliptical galaxy	Virgo	12^{h} 30^{m} 10.3^{s}	10° 46′ 46″	13.9
4483		Barred lenticular galaxy	Virgo	12^{h} 30^{m} 40.6^{s}	09° 00′ 56″	12.9
4485		Irregular galaxy	Canes Venatici	12^{h} 30^{m} 31.113^{s}	+41° 42′ 04.22″	11.93
4486	Messier 87	Elliptical galaxy	Virgo	12^{h} 30^{m} 49.4^{s}	+12° 23′ 28″	12.9
4486B		Elliptical galaxy	Virgo	12^{h} 31^{m} 49^{s}	+12° 20′ 56″	
4487		Spiral galaxy	Virgo	12^{h} 31^{m} 04.4322^{s}	−08° 03′ 14.110″	11.0
4488		Lenticular galaxy	Virgo	12^{h} 30^{m} 51.4^{s}	08° 21′ 36″	13.1
4489		Dwarf elliptical galaxy	Coma Berenices	12^{h} 30^{m} 52.2^{s}	16° 45′ 32″	12.84
4490		Barred spiral galaxy	Canes Venatici	12^{h} 30^{m} 36.2^{s}	+41° 38′ 38″	9.8
4491		Dwarf barred spiral galaxy	Virgo	12^{h} 30^{m} 57.1^{s}	11° 29′ 01″	13.5
4492	IC 3438	Spiral galaxy	Virgo	12^{h} 30^{m} 59.7^{s}	08° 04′ 40″	13.0
4493		Elliptical galaxy	Virgo	12^{h} 31^{m} 08.3699^{s}	+00° 36′ 49.325″	14.5
4494		Elliptical galaxy	Coma Berenices	12^{h} 31^{m} 24.1^{s}	+25° 46′ 31″	9.7
4495		Spiral galaxy	Coma Berenices	12^{h} 31^{m} 22.9217^{s}	+29° 08′ 11.472″	13.3
4496	NGC 4505	Spiral galaxy	Virgo	12^{h} 31^{m} 39.2^{s}	+03° 56′ 22″	11.4
4497		Lenticular galaxy	Virgo	12^{h} 31^{m} 32.5^{s}	11° 37′ 29″	13.3
4498		Barred spiral galaxy	Coma Berenices	12^{h} 31^{m} 39.5^{s}	16° 51′ 10″	12.79
4500		Barred spiral galaxy	Ursa Major	12^{h} 31^{m} 22.15431^{s}	+57° 57′ 52.6226″	12.52

== 4501–4600 ==
NGC number	Other names	Object type	Constellation	Right ascension (J2000)	Declination (J2000)	Apparent magnitude
4501	Messier 88	Spiral galaxy	Coma Berenices	12^{h} 31^{m} 59.3^{s}	+14° 25′ 13″	10.6
4502		Spiral galaxy	Coma Berenices	12^{h} 32^{m} 03.3^{s}	+16° 41′ 16″	14.8
4503		Barred lenticular galaxy	Virgo	12^{h} 32^{m} 06.2^{s}	11° 10′ 35″	12.05
4504		Spiral galaxy	Virgo	12^{h} 32^{m} 17.4095^{s}	−07° 33′ 48.897″	13.2
4505	(Duplicate of NGC 4496)	Spiral galaxy	Virgo	12^{h} 31^{m} 39.2^{s}	+03° 56′ 22″	11.4
4506		Spiral galaxy	Coma Berenices	12^{h} 32^{m} 10.5^{s}	13° 25′ 11″	13.7
4513		Lenticular galaxy, ring galaxy	Draco	12^{h} 32^{m} 01.5^{s}	66° 19′ 57″	13.7
4515		Lenticular galaxy	Coma Berenices	12^{h} 33^{m} 05.0^{s}	16° 15′ 56″	13.3
4516		Barred spiral galaxy	Coma Berenices	12^{h} 33^{m} 07.5349^{s}	+14° 34′ 29.892″	13.6
4517		Spiral galaxy	Virgo	12^{h} 32^{m} 45.586^{s}	+00° 06′ 54.14″	12.4
4519		Barred spiral galaxy	Virgo	12^{h} 33^{m} 30.2^{s}	08° 39′ 17″	12.9
4522		Spiral galaxy	Virgo	12^{h} 33^{m} 39.7^{s}	09° 10′ 30″	13.0
4523		Magellanic spiral galaxy	Coma Berenices	12^{h} 33^{m} 48.0^{s}	15° 10′ 06″	14.42
4525		Spiral galaxy	Coma Berenices	12^{h} 33^{m} 55.1^{s}	+30° 16′ 39″	13.0
4526		Lenticular galaxy	Virgo	12^{h} 34^{m} 03.2^{s}	+07° 41′ 58″	10.6
4527		Spiral galaxy	Virgo	12^{h} 34^{m} 08.466^{s}	+02° 39′ 14.414″	11.4
4528		Barred lenticular galaxy	Virgo	12^{h} 34^{m} 06.1^{s}	11° 19′ 17″	12.97
4530	Beta Canum Venaticorum	Star	Canes Venatici	12^{h} 33^{m} 44.54425^{s}	+41° 21′ 26.9214″	4.25
4531		Spiral galaxy	Virgo	12^{h} 34^{m} 15.9^{s}	13° 04′ 31″	12.42
4534		Spiral galaxy	Canes Venatici	12^{h} 34^{m} 05.420^{s}	+35° 31′ 06.00″	13.20
4535		Barred spiral galaxy	Virgo	12^{h} 34^{m} 20.310^{s}	+08° 11′ 51.94″	10.73
4536		Spiral galaxy	Virgo	12^{h} 34^{m} 27.2^{s}	+02° 11′ 15″	12.3
4540		Spiral galaxy	Coma Berenices	12^{h} 34^{m} 50.9^{s}	15° 33′ 06″	12.44
4541		Intermediate spiral galaxy	Virgo	12^{h} 35^{m} 10.6731^{s}	−00° 13′ 16.085″	13.6g
4544		Spiral galaxy	Virgo	12^{h} 35^{m} 36.6^{s}	03° 02′ 04″	14.00
4545		Barred spiral galaxy	Draco	12^{h} 34^{m} 34.1587^{s}	+63° 31′ 30.63″	12.3
4546		Lenticular field galaxy	Virgo	12^{h} 35^{m} 29.5^{s}	−03° 47′ 35.5″	10.57
4548	Messier 91	Spiral galaxy	Coma Berenices	12^{h} 35^{m} 26.6^{s}	+14° 29′ 45″	11.5
4550		Barred lenticular galaxy	Virgo	12^{h} 35^{m} 30.6^{s}	+12° 13′ 15″	12.2
4551		Elliptical galaxy	Virgo	12^{h} 35^{m} 37.9^{s}	12° 15′ 50″	12.97
4552	Messier 89	Elliptical galaxy	Virgo	12^{h} 35^{m} 40.0^{s}	+12° 33′ 23″	11.1
4555		Elliptical galaxy	Coma Berenices	12^{h} 35^{m} 41.3^{s}	+26° 31′ 23″	13.5
4559		Spiral galaxy	Coma Berenices	12^{h} 35^{m} 57.8^{s}	+27° 57′ 35″	10.7
4561		Barred spiral galaxy	Coma Berenices	12^{h} 36^{m} 08.137^{s}	+19° 19′ 21.32″	12.70
4564		Elliptical galaxy	Virgo	12^{h} 36^{m} 27.0^{s}	11° 26′ 21″	12.05
4565		Spiral galaxy	Coma Berenices	12^{h} 36^{m} 21.1^{s}	+25° 59′ 14″	10.3
4567	Siamese Twins	Interacting galaxy	Virgo	12^{h} 36^{m} 32.8^{s}	+11° 15′ 27″	12.1
4568	Siamese Twins	Interacting galaxy	Virgo	12^{h} 36^{m} 34.3^{s}	+11° 14′ 18″	12.1
4569	Messier 90	Spiral galaxy	Virgo	12^{h} 36^{m} 50.1^{s}	+13° 09′ 46″	11.8
4570		Lenticular galaxy	Virgo	12^{h} 36^{m} 53.4^{s}	07° 14′ 48″	11.84
4571		Spiral galaxy	Coma Berenices	12^{h} 36^{m} 56.4^{s}	+14° 13′ 02″	11.8
4578		Lenticular galaxy	Virgo	12^{h} 37^{m} 30.5^{s}	09° 33′ 18″	12.38
4579	Messier 58	Spiral galaxy	Virgo	12^{h} 37^{m} 43.5^{s}	+11° 49′ 04″	11.5
4580		Unbarred spiral galaxy	Virgo	12^{h} 37^{m} 48.4^{s}	05° 22′ 07″	12.7
4586		Spiral galaxy	Virgo	12^{h} 38^{m} 28.4^{s}	04° 19′ 09″	12.7
4589		Elliptical galaxy	Draco	12^{h} 37^{m} 24.9875^{s}	+74° 11′ 30.903″	10.73 ±0.15
4590	Messier 68	Globular cluster	Hydra	12^{h} 39^{m} 28.0^{s}	−26° 44′ 35″	10.3
4593		Barred spiral galaxy	Virgo	12^{h} 39^{m} 39.4^{s}	−05° 20′ 39″	11.67
4594	Messier 104; Sombrero Galaxy	Spiral galaxy	Virgo	12^{h} 39^{m} 59.4^{s}	−11° 37′ 23″	10.3
4595		Spiral galaxy	Coma Berenices	12^{h} 39^{m} 51.9^{s}	15° 17′ 52″	12.91
4596		Barred lenticular galaxy	Virgo	12^{h} 39^{m} 55.9^{s}	10° 10′ 34″	11.35
4598		Barred lenticular galaxy	Virgo	12^{h} 40^{m} 11.9^{s}	08° 23′ 01″	13.6

== 4601–4700 ==
NGC number	Other names	Object type	Constellation	Right ascension (J2000)	Declination (J2000)	Apparent magnitude
4603		Spiral galaxy	Centaurus	12^{h} 40^{m} 55.3^{s}	−40° 58′ 32″	12.1
4605		Spiral galaxy	Ursa Major	12^{h} 40^{m} 00.4^{s}	+61° 36′ 32″	10.8
4606		Spiral galaxy	Virgo	12^{h} 40^{m} 57.5^{s}	11° 54′ 44″	12.67
4607		Spiral galaxy	Virgo	12^{h} 41^{m} 12.4^{s}	11° 53′ 12″	13.75
4608		Barred lenticular galaxy	Virgo	12^{h} 41^{m} 13.286^{s}	+10° 09′ 20.38″	11.97
4609	Caldwell 98	Open cluster	Crux	12^{h} 42^{m} 19.7^{s}	−62° 59′ 42″	6.9
4610	(Duplicate of NGC 4470)	Spiral galaxy	Virgo	12^{h} 19^{m} 37.7893^{s}	+07° 49′ 27.624″	12.2
4611	IC 805	Intermediate spiral galaxy	Coma Berenices	12^{h} 41^{m} 25.45^{s}	+13° 43′ 46.3″	14.3
4612		Barred lenticular galaxy	Virgo	12^{h} 41^{m} 32.7^{s}	07° 18′ 54″	12.3
4614		Barred lenticular galaxy	Coma Berenices	12^{h} 41^{m} 31.46397^{s}	+26° 02′ 33.6235″	14.2
4615	Arp 34	Spiral galaxy	Coma Berenices	12^{h} 41^{m} 37.3313^{s}	+26° 04′ 21.871″	13.84
4617		Spiral galaxy	Canes Venatici	12^{h} 41^{m} 05.8961^{s}	+50° 23′ 36.233″	13.9g
4618		Irregular galaxy	Canes Venatici	12^{h} 41^{m} 32.5^{s}	+41° 09′ 00″	11.5
4619		Barred spiral galaxy	Canes Venatici	12^{h} 41^{m} 44.5498^{s}	+35° 03′ 45.776″	13.5g
4620		Lenticular galaxy	Virgo	12^{h} 41^{m} 59.3^{s}	12° 56′ 34″	13.5
4621	Messier 59	Elliptical galaxy	Virgo	12^{h} 42^{m} 02.4^{s}	+11° 38′ 45″	11.0
4622		Spiral galaxy	Centaurus	12^{h} 42^{m} 37.6^{s}	−40° 44′ 35″	13.5
4623		Lenticular galaxy	Virgo	12^{h} 42^{m} 10.8^{s}	+07° 40′ 34″	13.6
4624		Spiral galaxy	Virgo	12^{h} 42^{m} 50.0^{s}	+02° 41′ 17″	11.8
4625		Irregular galaxy	Canes Venatici	12^{h} 41^{m} 52.8^{s}	+41° 16′ 26″	13.0
4626		Spiral galaxy	Virgo	12^{h} 42^{m} 25.3^{s}	−07° 02′ 38″	14
4627		Elliptical galaxy	Canes Venatici	12^{h} 41^{m} 59.7^{s}	+32° 34′ 24″	13.3
4630		Irregular galaxy	Virgo	12^{h} 42^{m} 31.1^{s}	03° 57′ 37″	13.15
4631	Whale Galaxy Caldwell 32	Spiral galaxy	Canes Venatici	12^{h} 42^{m} 07.8^{s}	+32° 32′ 27″	9.8
4632		Spiral galaxy	Virgo	12^{h} 42^{m} 31.9896^{s}	−00° 04′ 57.684″	11.7
4633	IC 3688	Spiral galaxy	Coma Berenices	12^{h} 42^{m} 37.4^{s}	14° 21′ 26″	13.8
4634		Barred spiral galaxy	Coma Berenices	12^{h} 42^{m} 40.986^{s}	+14° 17′ 45.15″	11.67
4636		Elliptical galaxy	Virgo	12^{h} 42^{m} 49.8264^{s}	+02° 41′ 16.08″	9.4
4637		Lenticular galaxy	Virgo	12^{h} 42^{m} 54.1^{s}	11° 26′ 18″	16.00
4638		Lenticular galaxy	Virgo	12^{h} 42^{m} 47.4^{s}	11° 26′ 33″	12.1
4639		Spiral galaxy	Virgo	12^{h} 42^{m} 52.5^{s}	+13° 15′ 24″	12.4
4643		Lenticular galaxy	Virgo	12^{h} 43^{m} 20.134^{s}	+01° 58′ 42.24″	10.65
4647		Spiral galaxy	Virgo	12^{h} 43^{m} 32.6^{s}	+11° 34′ 55″	12.5
4649	Messier 60	Elliptical galaxy	Virgo	12^{h} 43^{m} 40.2^{s}	+11° 33′ 09″	10.3
4650		Spiral galaxy	Centaurus	12^{h} 44^{m} 19.7^{s}	−40° 43′ 50″	12.8
4653		Intermediate spiral galaxy	Virgo	12^{h} 43^{m} 50.9247^{s}	−00° 33′ 40.241″	13.4
4656		Interacting galaxy	Canes Venatici	12^{h} 43^{m} 58.2^{s}	+32° 10′ 09″	10.6
4657		Interacting galaxy	Canes Venatici	12^{h} 44^{m} 11.3^{s}	+32° 12′ 19″	
4666		Spiral galaxy	Virgo	12^{h} 45^{m} 08.3^{s}	−00° 27′ 49″	10.8
4674		Barred spiral galaxy	Virgo	12^{h} 46^{m} 03.5^{s}	−08° 39′ 20″	13.1
4676	Mice Galaxies	Interacting galaxies	Coma Berenices	12^{h} 46^{m} 10.2^{s}	+30° 43′ 54″	14.1
4680		spiral or lenticular galaxy	Virgo	12^{h} 46^{m} 54.7221^{s}	−11° 38′ 12.899″	12.8
4683		Barred lenticular galaxy	Centaurus	12^{h} 47^{m} 42.4^{s}	−41° 31′ 42″	13.8
4688		Barred spiral galaxy	Virgo	12^{h} 47^{m} 46.5187^{s}	+04° 20′ 08.927″	12.62
4689		Spiral galaxy	Coma Berenices	12^{h} 47^{m} 45.5^{s}	13° 45′ 46″	11.6
4691		Barred spiral galaxy	Virgo	12^{h} 48^{m} 13.600^{s}	−03° 19′ 57.73″	11.1
4694		Lenticular galaxy	Virgo	12^{h} 48^{m} 15.0422^{s}	+10° 59′ 01.671″	13.36
4696		Elliptical galaxy	Centaurus	12^{h} 48^{m} 49.3^{s}	−41° 18′ 40″	11.4
4697	Caldwell 52	Elliptical galaxy	Virgo	12^{h} 48^{m} 35.9^{s}	−05° 48′ 03″	10.97
4698		Barred spiral galaxy	Virgo	12^{h} 34^{m} 20.310^{s}	+08° 11′ 51.94″	10.6
4699		Intermediate spiral galaxy	Virgo	12^{h} 49^{m} 02.2^{s}	−08° 39′ 54″	9.6
4700		Spiral galaxy	Virgo	12^{h} 49^{m} 08.148^{s}	−11° 24′ 35.48″	14.32

== 4701–4800 ==
NGC number	Other names	Object type	Constellation	Right ascension (J2000)	Declination (J2000)	Apparent magnitude
4701		Unbarred spiral galaxy	Virgo	12^{h} 49^{m} 11.59329^{s}	+03° 23′ 19.3906″	
4706		Lenticular galaxy	Centaurus	12^{h} 49^{m} 54.1^{s}	−41° 16′ 46″	13.93
4707		Irregular galaxy	Canes Venatici	12^{h} 48^{m} 21.666^{s}	+51° 09′ 53.81″	12.91
4708		Spiral galaxy	Virgo	12^{h} 49^{m} 41.4813^{s}	−11° 05′ 34.679″	13.1
4709		Elliptical galaxy	Centaurus	12^{h} 50^{m} 03.9^{s}	−41° 22′ 55″	12.0
4710		Lenticular galaxy	Coma Berenices	12^{h} 49^{m} 38.9^{s}	+15° 09′ 54″	11.6
4712		Spiral galaxy	Coma Berenices	12^{h} 49^{m} 34.2^{s}	+25° 28′ 12″	13.3
4713		Spiral galaxy	Virgo	12^{h} 49^{m} 57.8972^{s}	+05° 18′ 40.795″	11.4
4722		Lenticular galaxy	Corvus	12^{h} 51^{m} 32.3681^{s}	−13° 19′ 47.993″	12.8
4725		Spiral galaxy	Coma Berenices	12^{h} 50^{m} 26.7^{s}	+25° 30′ 02″	10.2
4727	NGC 4740	Barred spiral galaxy	Corvus	12^{h} 50^{m} 57.2497^{s}	−14° 19′ 58.350″	11.8
4729		Elliptical galaxy	Centaurus	12^{h} 51^{m} 46.3^{s}	−41° 07′ 56″	13.42
4730		Lenticular galaxy	Centaurus	12^{h} 52^{m} 00.5^{s}	−41° 08′ 50″	13.87
4731		Barred spiral galaxy	Virgo	12^{h} 51^{m} 01.095^{s}	−06° 23′ 34.98″	
4733		Barred lenticular galaxy	Virgo	12^{h} 51^{m} 06.8^{s}	10° 54′ 43″	12.7
4734		Spiral galaxy	Virgo	12^{h} 51^{m} 12.8925^{s}	+04° 51′ 32.555″	13.5
4736	Messier 94	Spiral galaxy	Canes Venatici	12^{h} 50^{m} 52.6^{s}	+41° 07′ 09″	8.7
4740	(Duplicate of NGC 4727)	Barred spiral galaxy	Corvus	12^{h} 50^{m} 57.2497^{s}	−14° 19′ 58.350″	11.8
4743		Lenticular galaxy	Centaurus	12^{h} 52^{m} 16.0^{s}	−41° 23′ 26″	13.97
4744		Barred lenticular galaxy	Centaurus	12^{h} 52^{m} 19.6^{s}	−41° 03′ 36″	13.77
4746		Spiral galaxy	Virgo	12^{h} 51^{m} 55.36^{s}	12° 04′ 58.7″	
4747		Barred spiral galaxy	Coma Berenices	12^{h} 51^{m} 45.9^{s}	+25° 46′ 37″	12.4
4753		Lenticular galaxy	Virgo	12^{h} 52^{m} 22.0682^{s}	−01° 11′ 58.597″	10.85
4754		Barred lenticular galaxy	Virgo	12^{h} 52^{m} 17.5^{s}	11° 18′ 50″	11.52
4755	Jewel Box; Kappa Crucis Cluster; Caldwell 94	Open cluster	Crux	12^{h} 53^{m} 42^{s}	−60° 22′	
4762		Barred lenticular galaxy	Virgo	12^{h} 52^{m} 56.05^{s}	+11° 13′ 51″	11.12
4769		Double star	Virgo	12^{h} 53^{m} 18.1^{s}	−09° 40′ 23″	
4772		Spiral galaxy	Virgo	12^{h} 53^{m} 29.1613^{s}	+02° 10′ 06.157″	10.7
4774	Kidney Bean Galaxy	Ring galaxy	Canes Venatici	12^{h} 53^{m} 06.2^{s}	+36° 49′ 22″	14.3
4775		Spiral galaxy	Virgo	12^{h} 53^{m} 45.7048^{s}	−06° 37′ 20.669″	11.1
4777		Intermediate spiral ring galaxy	Virgo	12^{h} 53^{m} 58.54196^{s}	−08° 46′ 32.5147″	
4780		Intermediate spiral galaxy	Virgo	12^{h} 54^{m} 05.240^{s}	−08° 37′ 15.97″	
4781		Barred spiral galaxy	Virgo	12^{h} 54^{m} 23^{s}	−10° 32′ 13″	
4782		Elliptical galaxy	Corvus	12^{h} 54^{m} 35.7318^{s}	−12° 34′ 07.420″	11.7
4790		Barred spiral galaxy	Virgo	12^{h} 54^{m} 51.956^{s}	−10° 14′ 52.2″	12.4
4800		Spiral galaxy	Canes Venatici	12^{h} 54^{m} 37.78208^{s}	+46° 31′ 52.2815″	

== 4801–4900 ==
NGC number	Other names	Object type	Constellation	Right ascension (J2000)	Declination (J2000)	Apparent magnitude
4815		Open cluster	Musca	12^{h} 58^{m} 01^{s}	−64° 57′ 36″	8.6
4818		Spiral galaxy	Virgo	12^{h} 56^{m} 48.8829^{s}	−08° 31′ 30.906″	11.1
4825		Lenticular galaxy	Virgo	12^{h} 57^{m} 12.20^{s}	−13° 39′ 56.00″	11.9
4826	Messier 64; Black Eye Galaxy	Spiral galaxy	Coma Berenices	12^{h} 56^{m} 43.9^{s}	+21° 41′ 00″	8.9
4833		Globular cluster	Musca	12^{h} 59^{m} 35.0^{s}	−70° 52′ 29″	8.7
4835		Intermediate spiral galaxy	Centaurus	12^{h} 58^{m} 07.8403^{s}	−46° 15′ 51.559″	12.45
4839		Lenticular galaxy	Coma Berenices	12^{h} 57^{m} 24.361^{s}	+27° 29′ 52.14″	
4845	NGC 4910	Spiral galaxy	Virgo	12^{h} 58^{m} 01.2^{s}	+01° 34′ 33″	11.2"
4848		Barred spiral galaxy	Coma Berenices	12^{h} 58^{m} 05.6^{s}	+28° 14′ 34″	13.7
4856		Barred lenticular galaxy	Virgo	12^{h} 59^{m} 21.2482^{s}	−15° 02′ 31.153″	10.6
4860		Elliptical galaxy	Coma Berenices	12^{h} 59^{m} 03.91^{s}	+28° 07′ 25.3″	13.5
4861	Arp 266	Spiral galaxy or dwarf irregular galaxy	Canes Venatici	12^{h} 59^{m} 02.340^{s}	+34° 51′ 33.98″	12.32
4866		Unbarred lenticular galaxy	Virgo	12^{h} 59^{m} 27.140^{s}	+14° 10′ 15.78″	11.08
4868		Unbarred spiral galaxy	Canes Venatici	12^{h} 59^{m} 08.88278^{s}	+37° 18′ 37.4675″	
4869		Elliptical galaxy	Coma Berenices	12^{h} 59^{m} 23.36^{s}	27° 54′ 41.78″	13.52
4871		Lenticular galaxy	Coma Berenices	12^{h} 59^{m} 29.9^{s}	27° 57′ 23″	14.9
4872		Barred lenticular galaxy	Coma Berenices	12^{h} 59^{m} 34.0^{s}	27° 56′ 49″	15.2
4873		Lenticular galaxy	Coma Berenices	12^{h} 59^{m} 32.8^{s}	27° 59′ 01″	15.1
4874		Elliptical galaxy	Coma Berenices	12^{h} 59^{m} 35.709^{s}	+27° 57′ 33.80″	11.4
4875		Lenticular galaxy	Coma Berenices	12^{h} 59^{m} 37.9^{s}	27° 54′ 26″	15.4
4876		Elliptical galaxy	Coma Berenices	12^{h} 59^{m} 44.4^{s}	27° 54′ 45″	15.1
4881		Elliptical galaxy	Coma Berenices	12^{h} 59^{m} 57.8^{s}	+28° 14′ 48″	14.7
4882	(Duplicate of NGC 4886)	Elliptical galaxy	Coma Berenices	13^{h} 00^{m} 04.4^{s}	27° 59′ 15″	14.9
4883		Barred lenticular galaxy	Coma Berenices	12^{h} 59^{m} 56.0^{s}	28° 02′ 05″	15.0
4884	(Duplicate of NGC 4889)	Elliptical galaxy	Coma Berenices	13^{h} 00^{m} 08.1^{s}	+27° 58′ 37″	11.4
4886	NGC 4882	Elliptical galaxy	Coma Berenices	13^{h} 00^{m} 04.4^{s}	27° 59′ 15″	14.9
4889	Caldwell 35; NGC 4884	Elliptical galaxy	Coma Berenices	13^{h} 00^{m} 08.1^{s}	+27° 58′ 37″	11.4
4892		Spiral or lenticular galaxy	Coma Berenices	13^{h} 00^{m} 03.5^{s}	26° 53′ 53″	14.2
4895	NGC 4896	Lenticular galaxy	Coma Berenices	13^{h} 00^{m} 17.9^{s}	28° 12′ 08″	14.0
4896	(Duplicate of NGC 4895)	Lenticular galaxy	Coma Berenices	13^{h} 00^{m} 17.9^{s}	28° 12′ 08″	14.0
4900		Barred spiral galaxy	Virgo	13^{h} 00^{m} 39.2568^{s}	+02° 30′ 02.687″	

== 4901–5000 ==
NGC number	Other names	Object type	Constellation	Right ascension (J2000)	Declination (J2000)	Apparent magnitude
4907		Barred spiral galaxy	Coma Berenices	13^{h} 00^{m} 48.8^{s}	+28° 09′ 30″	14.1
4909		Ring galaxy	Centaurus	13^{h} 03^{m} 28^{s}	−42° 54′ 25″	12.7
4910	(Duplicate of NGC 4845)	Spiral galaxy	Virgo	12^{h} 58^{m} 01.2^{s}	+01° 34′ 33″	11.2
4911		Spiral galaxy	Coma Berenices	13^{h} 00^{m} 56.1^{s}	+27° 47′ 25.5″	12.8
4914		Elliptical galaxy	Canes Venatici	13^{h} 00^{m} 42.9213^{s}	+37° 18′ 55.086″	12.49
4918		Spiral galaxy	Virgo	13^{h} 01^{m} 50.62^{s}	−04° 30′ 02.01″	15.1
4919		Lenticular galaxy	Coma Berenices	13^{h} 01^{m} 17.6^{s}	27° 48′ 33″	14.6
4921		Barred spiral galaxy	Coma Berenices	13^{h} 01^{m} 26.1196^{s}	+27° 53′ 09.602″	13.04
4930		Barred spiral galaxy	Centaurus	13^{h} 04^{m} 05.2162^{s}	−41° 24′ 41.343″	11.5
4939		Spiral galaxy	Virgo	13^{h} 04^{m} 14.3133^{s}	−10° 20′ 22.417″	11.3
4941		Spiral galaxy	Virgo	13^{h} 04^{m} 13.0970^{s}	−05° 33′ 05.744″	11.2
4944		Lenticular galaxy	Coma Berenices	13^{h} 03^{m} 49.9481^{s}	+28° 11′ 08.490″	13.5g
4945	Caldwell 83	Spiral galaxy	Centaurus	13^{h} 05^{m} 26.1^{s}	−49° 28′ 15″	9.6
4958		Barred lenticular galaxy	Virgo	13^{h} 05^{m} 48.9027^{s}	−08° 01′ 12.799″	10.7
4976		Elliptical galaxy	Centaurus	13^{h} 08^{m} 37.4^{s}	−49° 30′ 20″	11.2
4980		Spiral galaxy	Hydra	13^{h} 09^{m} 10.082^{s}	−28° 38′ 30.44″	
4981		Barred spiral galaxy	Virgo	13^{h} 08^{m} 48.7580^{s}	−06° 46′ 38.938″	12.1
4984		Lenticular galaxy	Virgo	13^{h} 08^{m} 57.3^{s}	−15° 30′ 59″	12
4993	NGC 4994	Lenticular galaxy	Hydra	13^{h} 09^{m} 47.7^{s}	−23° 23′ 02″	13.32
4994	(Duplicate of NGC 4993)	Lenticular galaxy	Hydra	13^{h} 09^{m} 47.7^{s}	−23° 23′ 02″	13.32
4995		Intermediate spiral galaxy	Virgo	13^{h} 09^{m} 40.6390105944^{s}	−07° 50′ 00.223871892″	11.2
4999		Barred spiral galaxy	Virgo	13^{h} 09^{m} 33.131^{s}	01° 40′ 23.01″	
5000		Spiral galaxy	Coma Berenices	13^{h} 09^{m} 47.6^{s}	+28° 54′ 23″	14.2

== See also ==
- Lists of astronomical objects
