= NGC 4511 =

Galaxy in the constellation Ursa Major

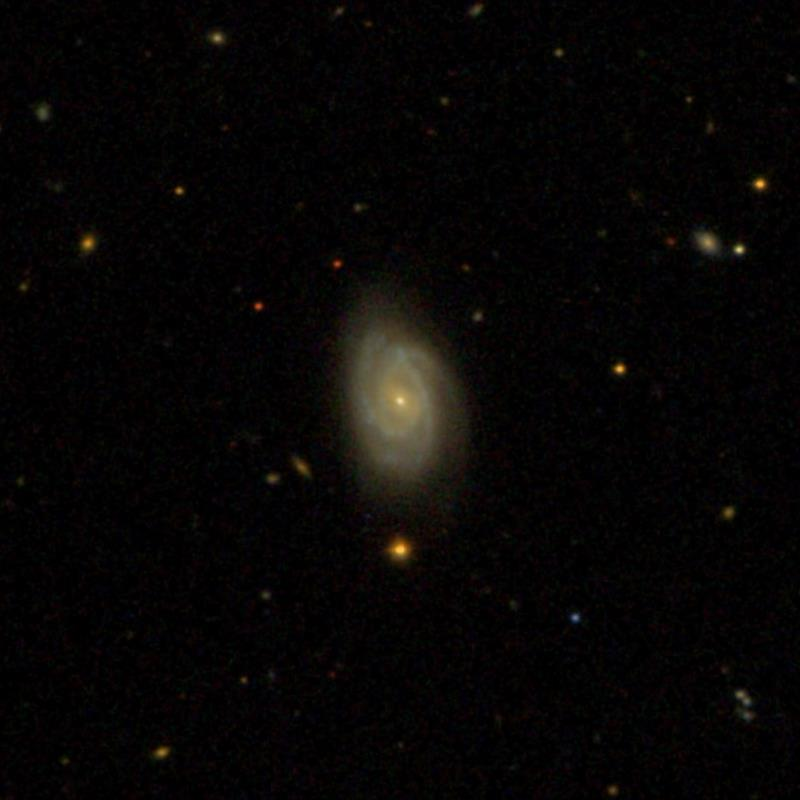

Observation data (J2000.0 epoch)
- Constellation: Ursa Major
- Right ascension: 12^{h} 32^{m} 8,1^{s}
- Declination: +58° 28′ 16″
- Redshift: 0.01535
- Distance: 212 million LY
- Apparent magnitude (V): 14.5

Characteristics
- Apparent size (V): 1.10 x 0.5

Other designations
- PGC 41560

NGC 4511 is a spiral galaxy in the constellation Ursa Major. It is currently classified as a type Sb(c?) galaxy. The galaxy was first discovered in 1790 by astronomer William Herschel. The compiler of the New General Catalogue, John Louis Emil Dreyer, described the galaxy as, "pretty faint, very small, irregular round, very gradually brighter middle."

According to measurements relative to the Cosmic microwave background, its radial velocity is 4757±11 km/s, corresponding to a Hubble distance of 70.2±4.9 Mpc.

== See also ==
- List of NGC objects (4001-5000)
