= NGC 4335 =

Galaxy in the constellation Ursa Major

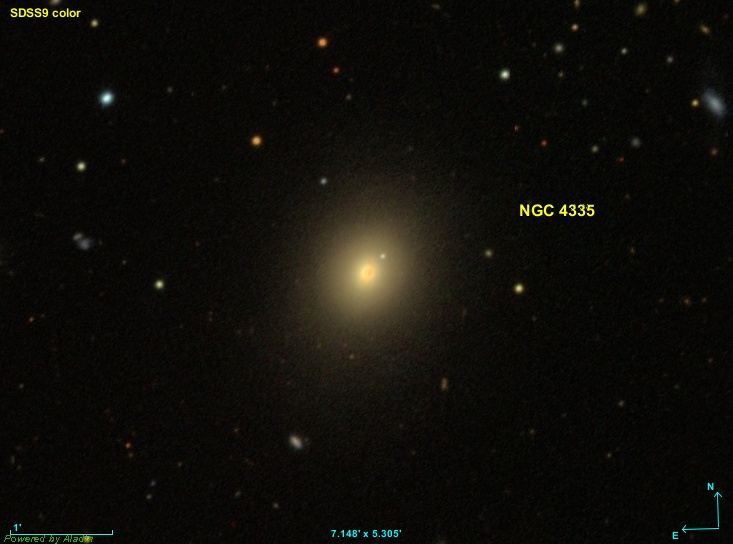
- NGC 4335 imaged by SDSS

Observation data (J2000 epoch)
- Constellation: Ursa Major
- Right ascension: 12^{h} 23^{m} 01.8985^{s}
- Declination: +58° 26′ 40.432″
- Redshift: 0.015371±0.00000418
- Heliocentric radial velocity: 4,608±1 km/s
- Distance: 228.7 ± 16.0 Mly (70.11 ± 4.91 Mpc)
- Apparent magnitude (V): 13.40

Characteristics
- Type: E
- Size: ~134,200 ly (41.15 kpc) (estimated)
- Apparent size (V): 1.9′ × 1.5′

Other designations
- IRAS F12206+5843, UGC 7455, MCG +10-18-035, PGC 40169, CGCG 293-015

NGC 4335 is an elliptical galaxy in the constellation of Ursa Major. It was discovered by German-British astronomer William Herschel on 17 April 1789. Its velocity with respect to the cosmic microwave background is 4,753±10 km/s, which corresponds to a Hubble distance of 228.7 ± 16.0 Mly (70.11 ± 4.91 Mpc).

NGC 4335 is a radio galaxy, i.e. it has giant regions of radio emission extending well beyond its visible structure.

According to Abraham Mahtessian, NGC 4335 and NGC 4362 form a pair of galaxies.

== Supermassive black hole ==
According to a study published in 2009, and based on the internal velocity of the galaxy measured by the Hubble Space Telescope, the mass of the supermassive black hole at the center of NGC 4335 is between 130 and 550 million M_{☉}.

== Supernova ==
One supernova has been observed in NGC 4335:

- SN 1955E (type unknown, mag. 16.3) was discovered by Fritz Zwicky on photographic plates dated 10 May 1955, but they were not found until early 1968.

== Image gallery ==
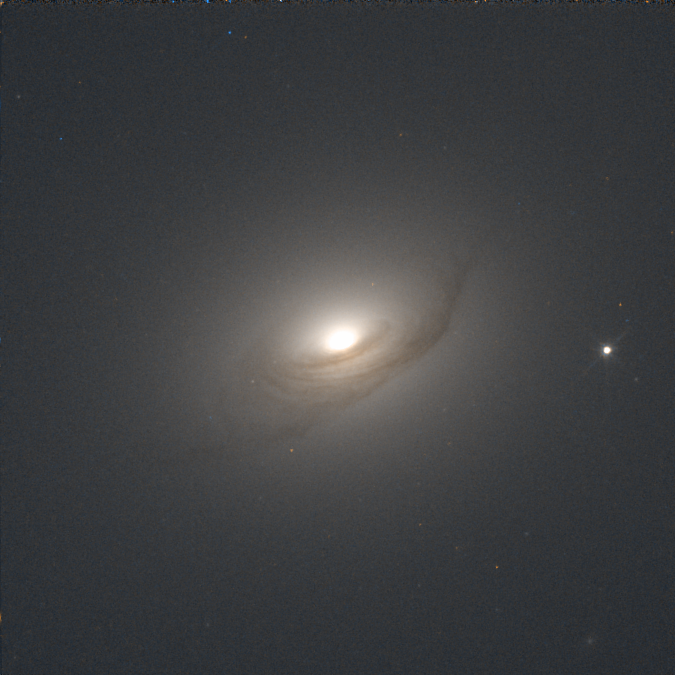
NGC 4335 imaged by the Hubble Space Telescope

== See also ==
- List of NGC objects (4001–5000)
