= NGC 4168 =

Galaxy in the constellation Virgo

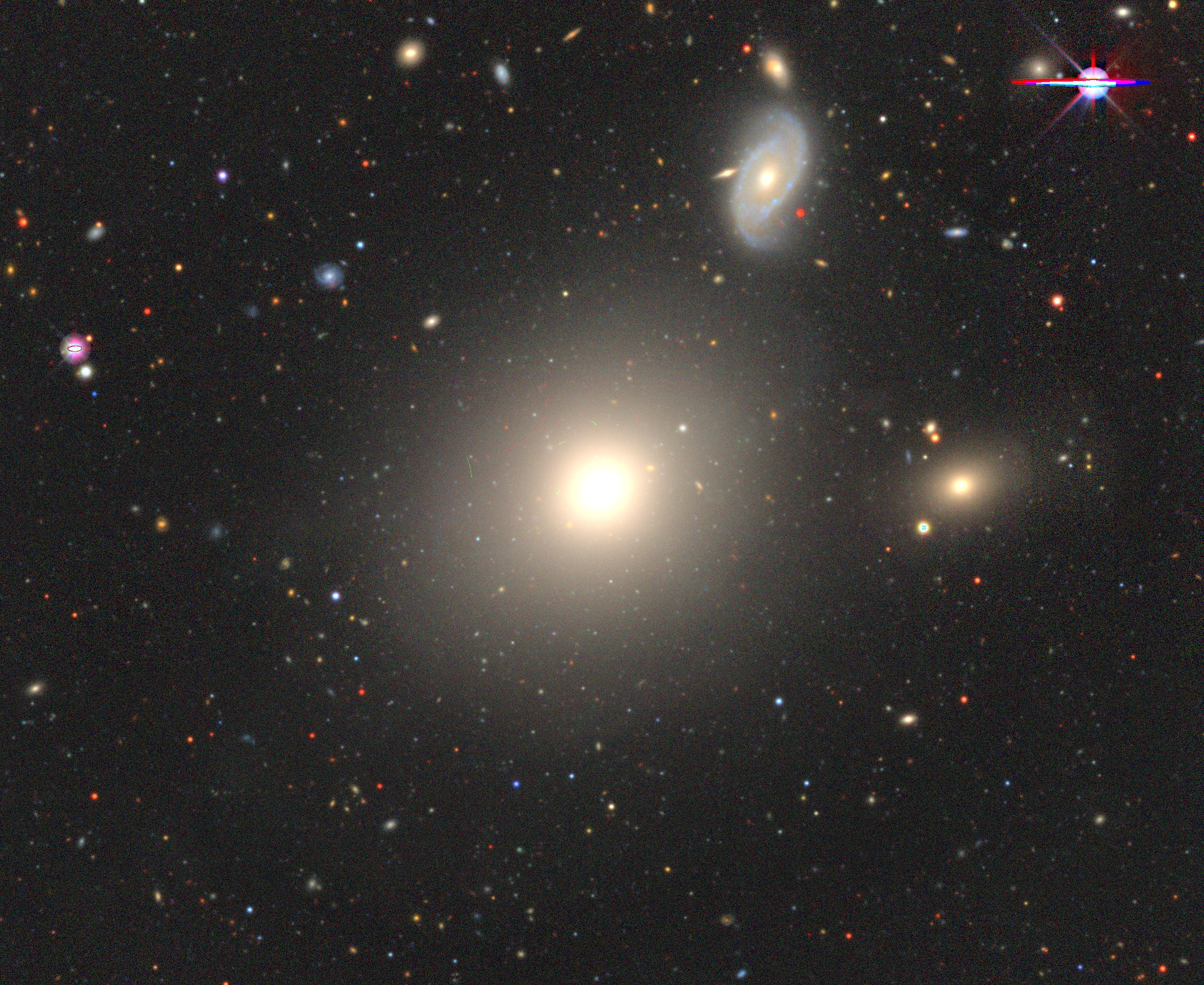
- NGC 4168 with NGC 4165 (above, to the right) and NGC 4164 (to the right), imaged by Legacy Surveys

Observation data (J2000 epoch)
- Constellation: Virgo
- Right ascension: 12^{h} 12^{m} 17.2685^{s}
- Declination: +13° 12′ 18.701″
- Redshift: 0.007582±0.00000667
- Heliocentric radial velocity: 2,273±2 km/s
- Distance: 98.35 ± 10.89 Mly (30.154 ± 3.338 Mpc)
- Group or cluster: Virgo Cluster
- Apparent magnitude (V): 12.4g

Characteristics
- Type: E2
- Size: ~80,100 ly (24.56 kpc) (estimated)
- Apparent size (V): 2.03′ × 1.58′

Other designations
- VCC 49, 2MASX J12121723+1312192, UGC 7203, MCG +02-31-046, PGC 38890, CGCG 069-081

NGC 4168 is an elliptical galaxy in the constellation of Virgo. Its velocity with respect to the cosmic microwave background is 2,609±24 km/s, which corresponds to a Hubble distance of 125.5 ± 8.9 Mly (38.48 ± 2.72 Mpc). However, 13 non-redshift measurements give a closer mean distance of 98.35 ± 10.89 Mly (30.154 ± 3.338 Mpc). It was discovered by German-British astronomer William Herschel on 8 April 1784.

NGC 4168 is a Seyfert II galaxy, i.e. it has a quasar-like nucleus with very high surface brightnesses whose spectra reveal strong, high-ionisation emission lines, but unlike quasars, the host galaxy is clearly detectable.

== Virgo cluster ==
NGC 4168 is a member of the Virgo Cluster.

== Supernova ==
One supernova has been observed in NGC 4168:

- SN 2026acd (Type Ia, mag. 18.876) was discovered by ATLAS on 14 January 2026.

== See also ==
- List of NGC objects (4001–5000)
