= NGC 4474 =

Galaxy in the constellation Coma Berenices

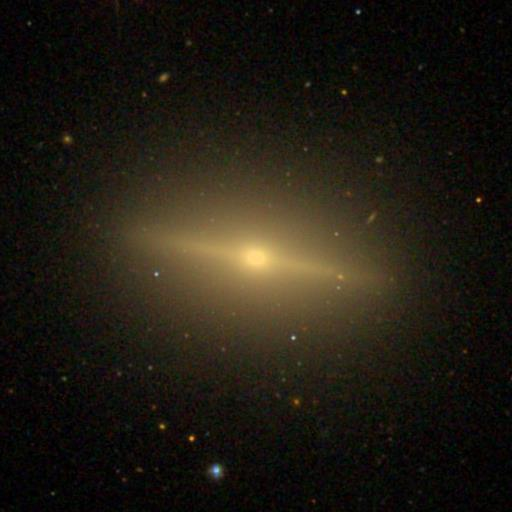
- SDSS image of NGC 4474.

Observation data (J2000 epoch)
- Constellation: Coma Berenices
- Right ascension: 12^{h} 29^{m} 53.5^{s}
- Declination: 14° 04′ 07″
- Redshift: 0.005374/1611 km/s
- Distance: 51,481,920 ly
- Group or cluster: Virgo Cluster
- Apparent magnitude (V): 12.5

Characteristics
- Type: S0 pec
- Size: ~36,055.6 ly (estimated)
- Apparent size (V): 2.11 x 1.12

Other designations
- PGC 41241, UGC 7634, VCC 1242

NGC 4474 is an edge-on lenticular galaxy located about 50 million light-years away in the constellation Coma Berenices. NGC 4474 was discovered by astronomer William Herschel on April 8, 1784. It is a member of the Virgo Cluster.

== See also ==
- List of NGC objects (4001–5000)
