= NGC 4619 =

Galaxy in the constellation Canes Venatici

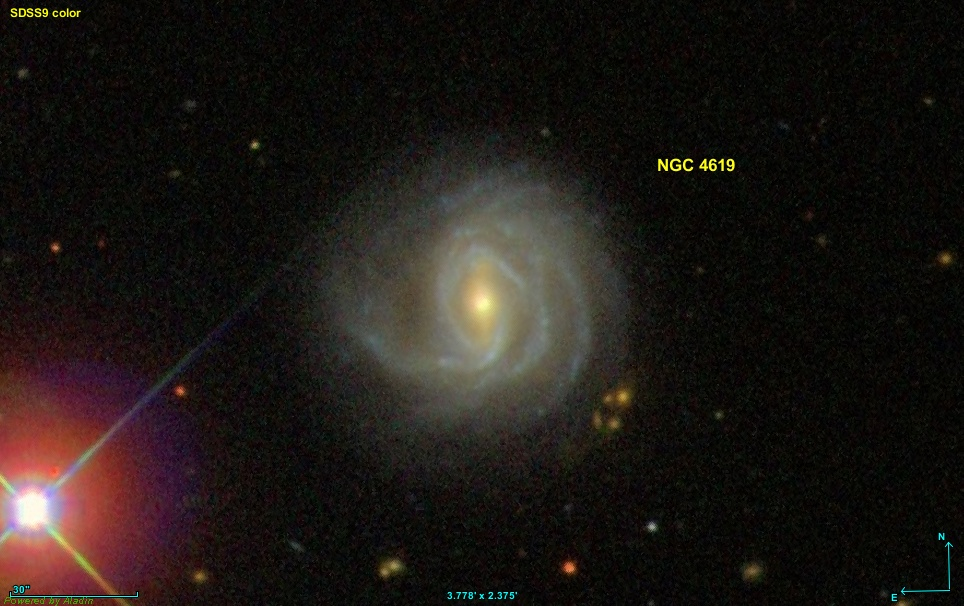
- NGC 4619 imaged by SDSS. The foreground star in the lower left is catalogued as HD 110438.

Observation data (J2000 epoch)
- Constellation: Canes Venatici
- Right ascension: 12^{h} 41^{m} 44.5498^{s}
- Declination: +35° 03′ 45.776″
- Redshift: 0.023093±0.00000667
- Heliocentric radial velocity: 6,923±2 km/s
- Distance: 331.74 ± 12.34 Mly (101.713 ± 3.783 Mpc)
- Apparent magnitude (V): 13.5g

Characteristics
- Type: SB(r)b pec
- Size: ~149,200 ly (45.76 kpc) (estimated)
- Apparent size (V): 1.25′ × 1.06′

Other designations
- IRAS 12393+3520, 2MASX J12414453+3503463, UGC 7856, MCG +06-28-018, PGC 42594, CGCG 188-014

NGC 4619 is a barred spiral galaxy in the constellation of Canes Venatici. Its velocity with respect to the cosmic microwave background is 7,176±18 km/s, which corresponds to a Hubble distance of 345.2 ± 24.2 Mly (105.84 ± 7.41 Mpc). However, 15 non-redshift measurements give a closer mean distance of 331.74 ± 12.34 Mly (101.713 ± 3.783 Mpc). It was discovered by German-British astronomer William Herschel on 1 May 1785.

NGC 4619 is a Seyfert II galaxy, i.e. it has a quasar-like nucleus with very high surface brightnesses whose spectra reveal strong, high-ionisation emission lines, but unlike quasars, the host galaxy is clearly detectable.

== Supernova ==
One supernova has been observed in NGC 4619:

- SN 2006ac (Type Ia, mag. 16.0) was discovered by the Lick Observatory Supernova Search (LOSS) on 9 February 2006.

== See also ==
- List of NGC objects (4001–5000)
