= NGC 4219 =

Galaxy in the constellation Centaurus

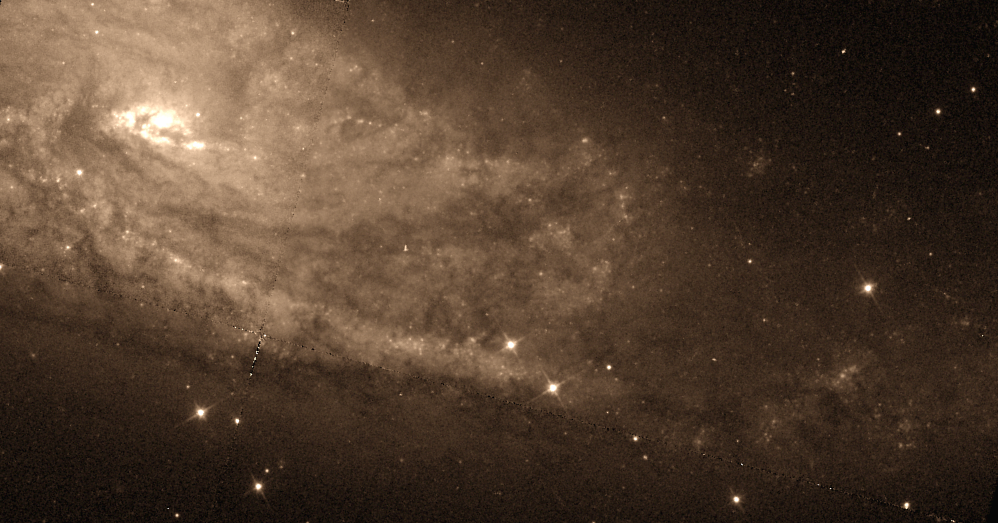
- NGC 4219 imaged by the Hubble Space Telescope

Observation data (J2000 epoch)
- Constellation: Centaurus
- Right ascension: 12^{h} 16^{m} 27.3732^{s}
- Declination: −43° 19′ 26.839″
- Redshift: 0.006635±0.0000100
- Heliocentric radial velocity: 1,989±3 km/s
- Distance: 72.00 ± 2.21 Mly (22.075 ± 0.679 Mpc)
- Apparent magnitude (V): 12.71

Characteristics
- Type: SA(s)bc
- Size: ~111,000 ly (34.03 kpc) (estimated)
- Apparent size (V): 4.3′ × 1.3′

Other designations
- ESO 267- G 037, IRAS 12138-4302, 2MASX J12162731-4319274, MCG -07-25-005, PGC 39315

NGC 4219 is a spiral galaxy in the constellation of Centaurus. Its velocity with respect to the cosmic microwave background is 2,277±20 km/s, which corresponds to a Hubble distance of 109.6 ± 7.7 Mly (33.59 ± 2.37 Mpc). However, 16 non-redshift measurements give a closer mean distance of 72.00 ± 2.21 Mly (22.075 ± 0.679 Mpc). It was discovered by British astronomer John Herschel on 3 June 1834.

NGC 4219 is a Seyfert I galaxy, i.e. it has a quasar-like nucleus with very high surface brightnesses whose spectra reveal strong, high-ionisation emission lines, but unlike quasars, the host galaxy is clearly detectable.

== Supernovae ==
Two supernovae have been observed in NGC 4219:

- SN 2011am (Type Ib, mag. 17.4) was discovered by Australian amateur astronomer Stuart Parker on 27 February 2011.
- SN 2011hp (Type Ic, mag. 15.7) was discovered by South African amateur astronomer Berto Monard on 3 November 2011.

== Image gallery ==
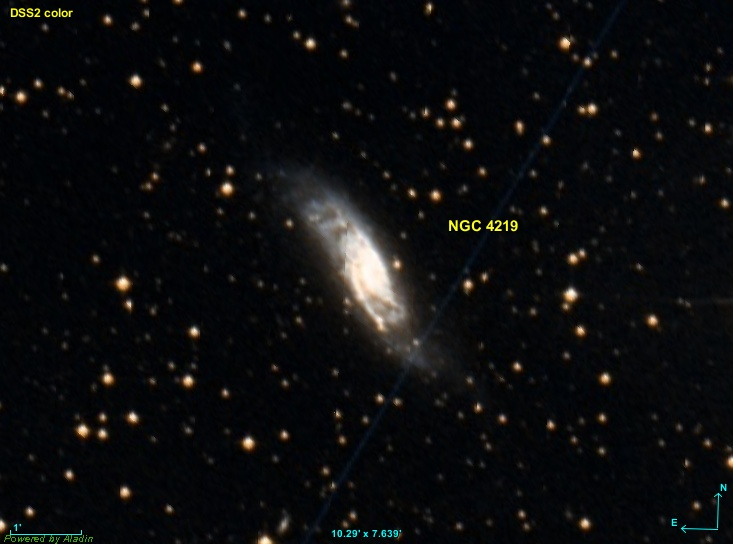
NGC 4219 imaged by SDSS

== See also ==
- List of NGC objects (4001–5000)
