= NGC 4528 =

Galaxy in the constellation Virgo

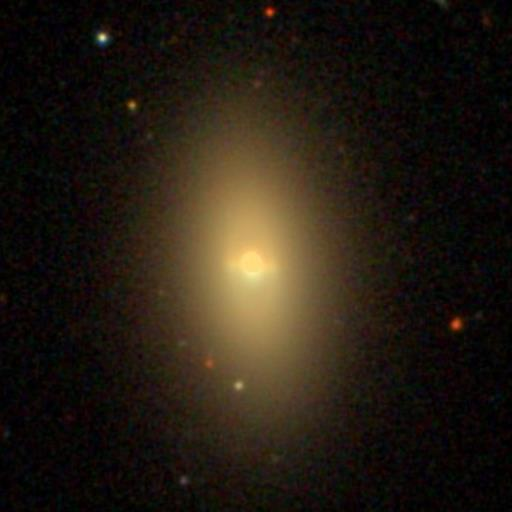
- SDSS image of NGC 4528.

Observation data (J2000 epoch)
- Constellation: Virgo
- Right ascension: 12^{h} 34^{m} 06.1^{s}
- Declination: 11° 19′ 17″
- Redshift: 0.004597
- Heliocentric radial velocity: 1378 km/s
- Distance: 50.5 Mly
- Group or cluster: Virgo Cluster
- Apparent magnitude (V): 12.97

Characteristics
- Type: SB0
- Size: ~27,400 ly (estimated)
- Apparent size (V): 1.7 x 1.0

Other designations
- PGC 41781, UGC 7722, VCC 1537

NGC 4528 is a barred lenticular galaxy located about 50 million light-years away in the constellation Virgo. It was discovered by astronomer William Herschel on March 15, 1784. The galaxy is a member of the Virgo Cluster.

== See also ==
- List of NGC objects (4001–5000)
- NGC 4340
