= NGC 4746 =

Spiral galaxy in the constellation Virgo

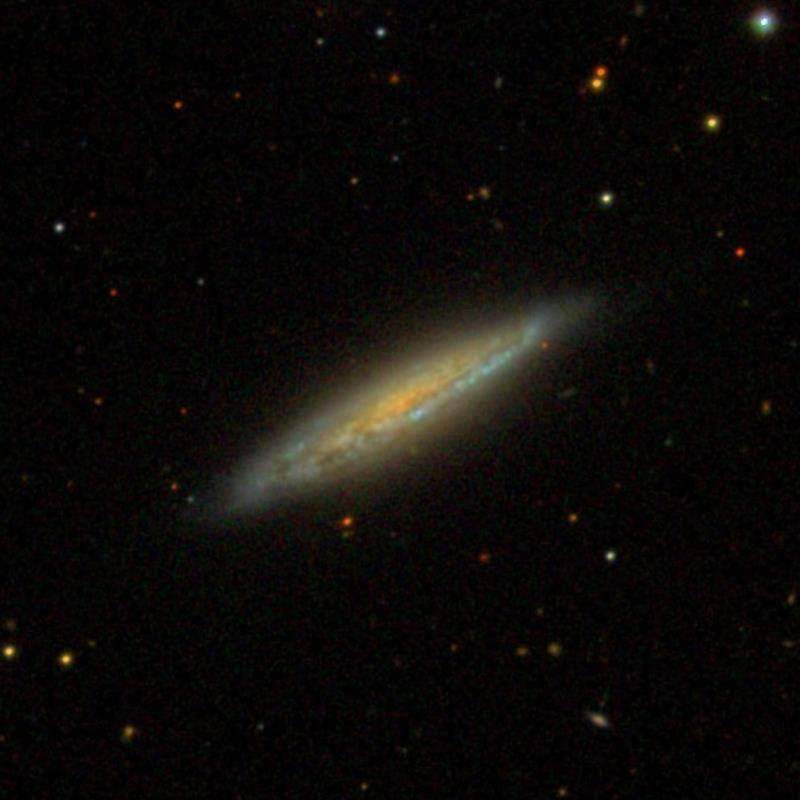
- SDSS image of NGC 4746

Observation data (J2000 epoch)
- Constellation: Virgo
- Right ascension: 12^{h} 51^{m} 55.36^{s}
- Declination: 12° 04′ 58.7″
- Redshift: 0.00595
- Heliocentric radial velocity: 1783 +/- 5 km/s
- Distance: 106.8 Mly
- Apparent magnitude (B): 13.3
- Absolute magnitude (V): -19.2

Characteristics
- Type: Sb

Other designations
- UGC 8007, MCG +02-33-029, PGC 43601

NGC 4746 is an edge-on spiral galaxy located 107 million light-years away in the constellation Virgo. It was discovered by John Herschel during a sky-survey on March 29, 1830.

== See also ==
- List of NGC objects (4001-5000)
- List of NGC objects
