= NGC 4674 =

Galaxy in the constellation Virgo

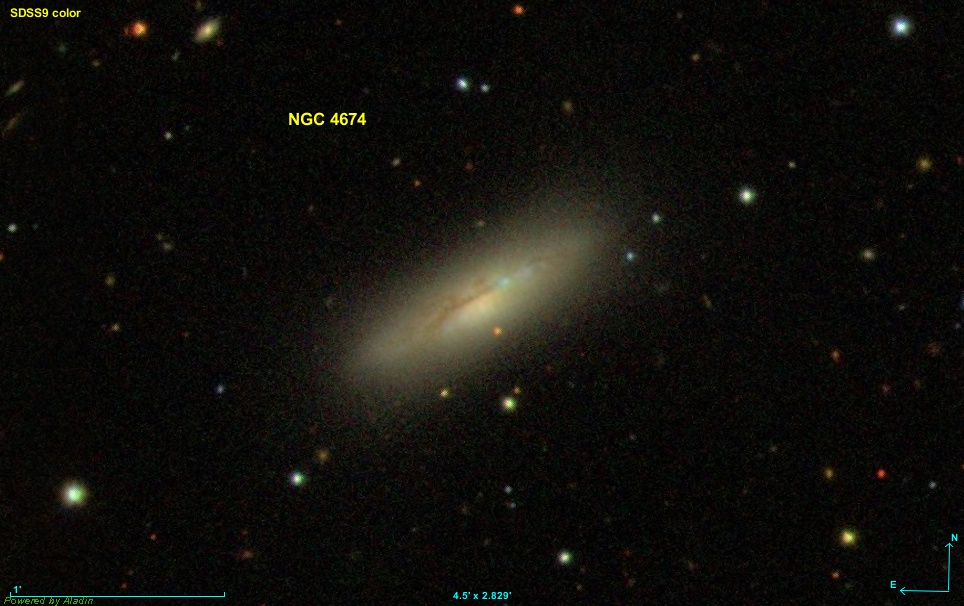
- The barred spiral galaxy NGC 4674.

Observation data (J2000 epoch)
- Constellation: Virgo
- Right ascension: 12^{h} 46^{m} 03.4249^{s}
- Declination: −08° 39′ 18.484″
- Redshift: 0.005023
- Heliocentric radial velocity: 1506 ± 37 km/s
- Distance: 88.8 ± 6.8 Mly (27.23 ± 2.09 Mpc)
- Apparent magnitude (V): 13.1

Characteristics
- Type: SAB(s)a pec edge-on
- Size: ~46,800 ly (14.34 kpc) (estimated)
- Apparent size (V): 1.6′ × 0.5′

Other designations
- IRAS F12434-0822, 2MASS J12460346-0839198, MCG -01-33-005, PGC 43050, SDSS J124603.46-083920.5

NGC 4674 is an edge-on barred spiral galaxy located in the constellation of Virgo. Its velocity relative to the cosmic microwave background is 1,846 ± 44 km/s, which corresponds to a Hubble distance of 27.23 ± 2.09 Mpc (~88.8 million light-years). NGC 4674 was discovered by British astronomer John Herschel on 5 May 1836.

NGC 4674 has a possible active galactic nucleus, i.e. it has a compact region at the center of a galaxy that emits a significant amount of energy across the electromagnetic spectrum, with characteristics indicating that this luminosity is not produced by the stars.

== Supernova ==
One supernova has been observed in NGC 4674: SN 1907A (type unknown, mag. 13.5) was discovered by Luyten on 9 May 1907.

== See also ==
- List of NGC objects (4001–5000)
