= NGC 4207 =

Spiral galaxy in the constellation Virgo

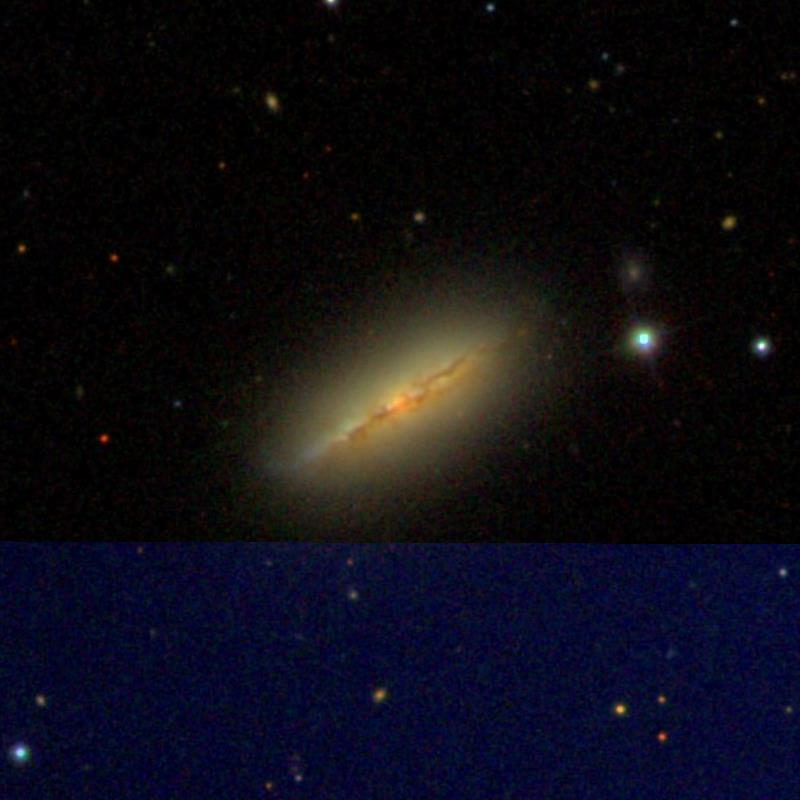
- SDSS image of NGC 4207

Observation data (J2000 epoch)
- Constellation: Virgo
- Right ascension: 12^{h} 15^{m} 30.5^{s}
- Declination: 09° 35′ 06″
- Redshift: 0.001988
- Heliocentric radial velocity: 596 km/s
- Distance: 47 Mly (14.4 Mpc)
- Group or cluster: Virgo Cluster
- Apparent magnitude (V): 13.3

Characteristics
- Type: Scd
- Size: ~27,000 ly (8.3 kpc) (estimated)
- Apparent size (V): 1.59 x 0.91

Other designations
- CGCG 69-107, IRAS 12129+0951, MCG 2-31-69, PGC 39206, UGC 7268, VCC 152

NGC 4207 is a spiral galaxy located about 50 million light-years away in the constellation Virgo. The galaxy was discovered by astronomer Heinrich d'Arrest on March 23, 1865. NGC 4207 is a member of the Virgo Cluster.

== See also ==
- List of NGC objects (4001–5000)
