= NGC 4531 =

Spiral galaxy in the constellation Virgo

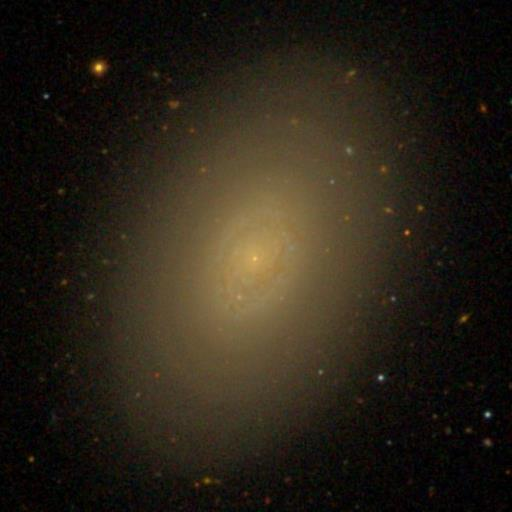
- SDSS image of NGC 4531.

Observation data (J2000 epoch)
- Constellation: Virgo
- Right ascension: 12^{h} 34^{m} 15.9^{s}
- Declination: 13° 04′ 31″
- Redshift: 0.000650/195 km/s
- Distance: 49.55 Mly
- Group or cluster: Virgo Cluster
- Apparent magnitude (V): 12.42

Characteristics
- Type: SB0^+
- Size: ~50,270 ly (estimated)
- Apparent size (V): 3.1 x 2.0

Other designations
- PGC 41806, UGC 7729, VCC 1552

NGC 4531 is a spiral galaxy located about 50 million light-years away in the constellation Virgo. It was discovered by astronomer William Herschel on April 17, 1784. NGC 4531 is a member of the Virgo Cluster.

== See also ==
- List of NGC objects (4001–5000)
- NGC 4826
