= NGC 4595 =

Galaxy in the constellation Coma Berenices

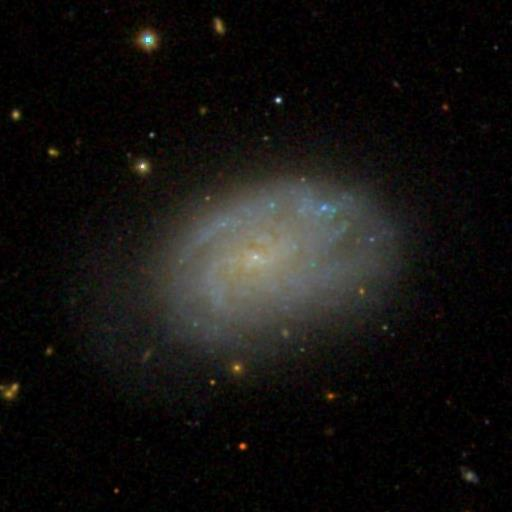
- Sloan Digital Sky Survey image of NGC 4595.

Observation data (J2000 epoch)
- Constellation: Coma Berenices
- Right ascension: 12^{h} 39^{m} 51.9^{s}
- Declination: 15° 17′ 52″
- Redshift: 0.002105
- Heliocentric radial velocity: 631 km/s
- Distance: 42 Mly (13 Mpc)
- Group or cluster: Virgo Cluster
- Apparent magnitude (V): 12.91

Characteristics
- Type: SAB(rs)b
- Size: ~23,600 ly (7.23 kpc) (estimated)
- Apparent size (V): 1.7 x 1.1

Other designations
- CGCG 99-106, IRAS 12373+1534, MCG 3-32-81, PGC 42396, UGC 7826, VCC 1811

NGC 4595 is a spiral galaxy located about 42 million light-years away in the constellation Coma Berenices. NGC 4595 was discovered by astronomer William Herschel on January 14, 1787. NGC 4595 is a member of the Virgo Cluster.

== See also ==
- List of NGC objects (4001–5000)
