= NGC 4617 =

Galaxy in the constellation Canes Venatici

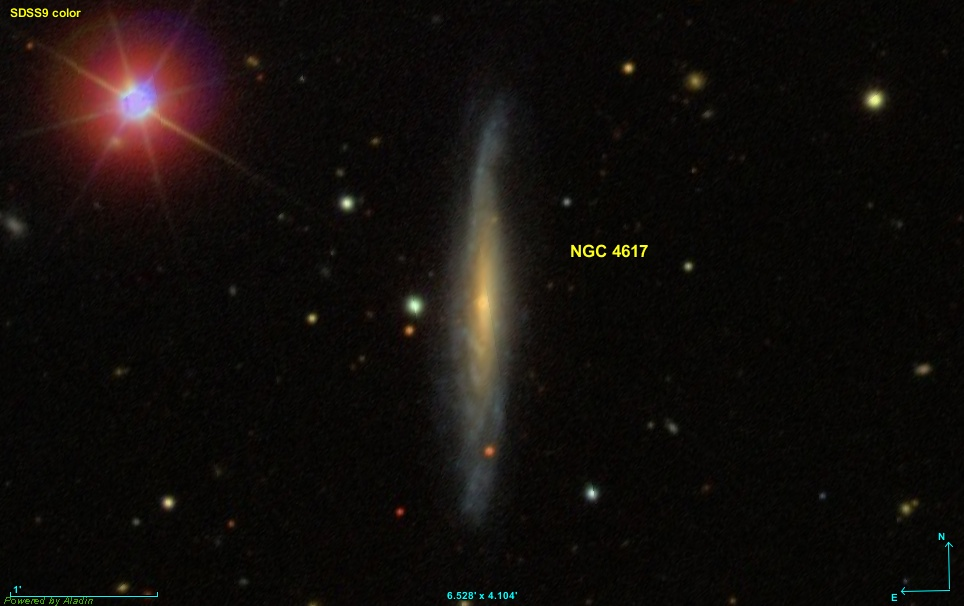
- NGC 4617 imaged by SDSS

Observation data (J2000 epoch)
- Constellation: Canes Venatici
- Right ascension: 12^{h} 41^{m} 05.8961^{s}
- Declination: +50° 23′ 36.233″
- Redshift: 0.015506±0.00000634
- Heliocentric radial velocity: 4,649±2 km/s
- Distance: 198.96 ± 2.10 Mly (61.000 ± 0.644 Mpc)
- Apparent magnitude (V): 13.9g

Characteristics
- Type: Sb
- Size: ~179,400 ly (55.01 kpc) (estimated)
- Apparent size (V): 2.61′ × 0.62′

Other designations
- IRAS F12387+5040, UGC 7847, MCG +09-21-028, PGC 42530, CGCG 270-013

NGC 4617 is a spiral galaxy in the constellation of Canes Venatici. Its velocity with respect to the cosmic microwave background is 4,831±13 km/s, which corresponds to a Hubble distance of 232.4 ± 16.3 Mly (71.25 ± 4.99 Mpc). However, four non-redshift measurements give a closer mean distance of 198.96 ± 2.10 Mly (61.000 ± 0.644 Mpc). It was discovered by German-British astronomer William Herschel on 9 March 1788.

NGC 4617 is an active galaxy nucleus candidate, i.e. it has a compact region at the center of a galaxy that emits a significant amount of energy across the electromagnetic spectrum, with characteristics indicating that this luminosity is not produced by the stars.

== Supernovae ==
Two supernovae have been observed in NGC 4617:

- SN 2005ab (Type II, mag. 16.7) was discovered by Japanese astronomer Kōichi Itagaki on 5 February 2005.
- SN 2007ss (Type Ia, mag. 16.6) was discovered by Japanese astronomer Yoshimi Ichimura on 20 December 2007.

== See also ==
- List of NGC objects (4001–5000)
