= NGC 4541 =

Galaxy in the constellation Virgo

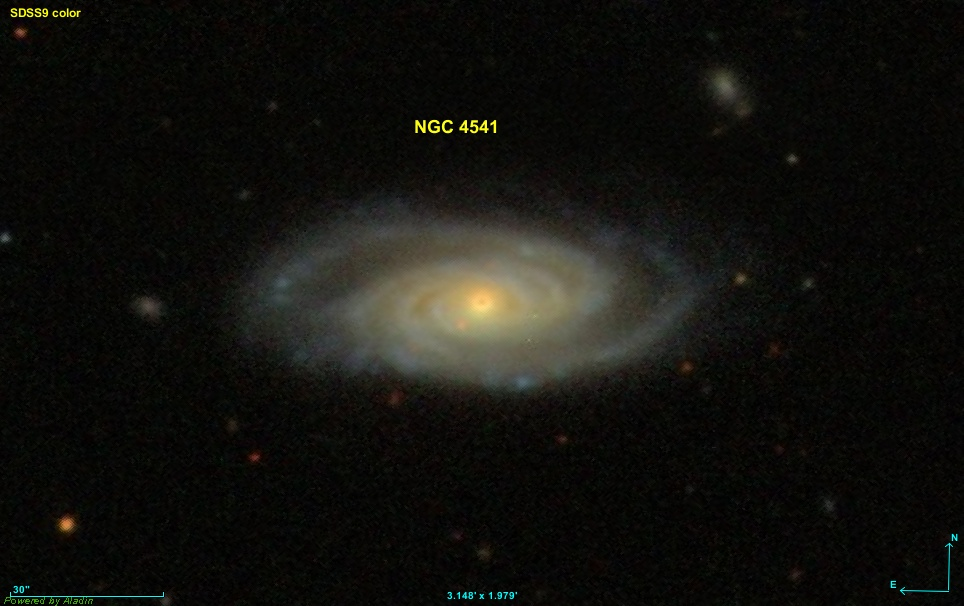
- NGC 4541 imaged by SDSS

Observation data (J2000 epoch)
- Constellation: Virgo
- Right ascension: 12^{h} 35^{m} 10.6731^{s}
- Declination: −00° 13′ 16.085″
- Redshift: 0.022966±0.0000170
- Heliocentric radial velocity: 6,885±5 km/s
- Distance: 312.09 ± 9.57 Mly (95.688 ± 2.933 Mpc)
- Apparent magnitude (V): 13.6g

Characteristics
- Type: (R')SAB(r)bc
- Size: ~154,300 ly (47.32 kpc) (estimated)
- Apparent size (V): 1.58′ × 0.68′

Other designations
- IRAS 12326+0003, 2MASX J12351066-0013157, UGC 7749, MCG +00-32-024, PGC 41911, CGCG 014-071

NGC 4541 is an intermediate spiral galaxy in the constellation of Virgo. Its velocity with respect to the cosmic microwave background is 7,229±25 km/s, which corresponds to a Hubble distance of 347.8 ± 24.4 Mly (106.63 ± 7.47 Mpc). However, eight non-redshift measurements give a closer mean distance of 312.09 ± 9.57 Mly (95.688 ± 2.933 Mpc). It was discovered by German-British astronomer William Herschel on 1 January 1786.

NGC 4541 is a Seyfert II galaxy, i.e. it has a quasar-like nucleus with very high surface brightnesses whose spectra reveal strong, high-ionisation emission lines, but unlike quasars, the host galaxy is clearly detectable. NGC 4541 is also a radio galaxy, i.e. it has giant regions of radio emission extending well beyond its visible structure.

== Supernovae ==
Two supernovae have been observed in NGC 4541:

- SN 2007gq (type unknown, mag. 16.6) was discovered by Berto Monard on 4 August 2007.
- PTF11bpx (Type II, mag. 19.5) was discovered by the Palomar Transient Factory on 4 April 2011.

== See also ==
- List of NGC objects (4001–5000)
