= NGC 4141 =

Galaxy in the constellation Ursa Major

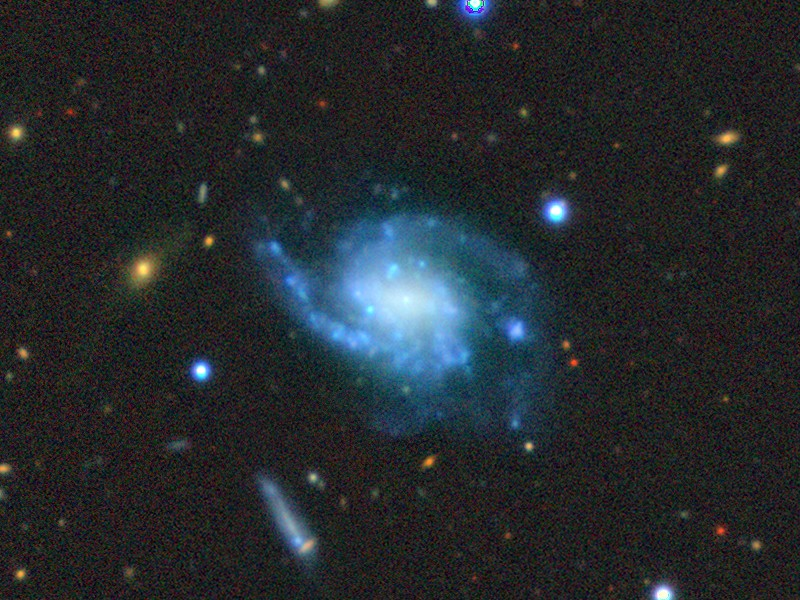
- NGC 4141 imaged by Legacy Surveys

Observation data (J2000 epoch)
- Constellation: Ursa Major
- Right ascension: 12^{h} 09^{m} 47.3208^{s}
- Declination: +58° 50′ 57.066″
- Redshift: 0.006354±0.000009
- Heliocentric radial velocity: 1,905±3 km/s
- Distance: 133.07 ± 10.76 Mly (40.800 ± 3.300 Mpc)
- Apparent magnitude (V): 14.6g

Characteristics
- Type: SBcd
- Size: ~54,200 ly (16.62 kpc) (estimated)
- Apparent size (V): 0.96′ × 0.74′

Other designations
- IRAS F12072+5907, UGC 7147, MCG +10-17-152, PGC 38669, CGCG 292-074

NGC 4141 is a barred spiral galaxy in the constellation of Ursa Major. Its velocity with respect to the cosmic microwave background is 2,051±11 km/s, which corresponds to a Hubble distance of 98.7 ± 6.9 Mly (30.25 ± 2.12 Mpc). However, two non-redshift measurements give a farther mean distance of 133 ± 11 Mly (40.8 ± 3.3 Mpc). It was discovered by German-British astronomer William Herschel on 17 April 1789.

NGC 4141 is listed as having an active galactic nucleus.

== Supernovae ==
Two supernovae has been observed in NGC 4141:

- SN 2008X (Type II-P, mag. 17.6) was discovered by Scottish amateur astronomer Tom Boles, and independently by the Lick Observatory Supernova Search (LOSS), on 7 February 2008.
- SN 2009E (Type II-P, mag. 17.8) was discovered by Tom Boles on 3 January 2009.

== See also ==
- List of NGC objects (4001–5000)
