= NGC 4545 =

Galaxy in the constellation Draco

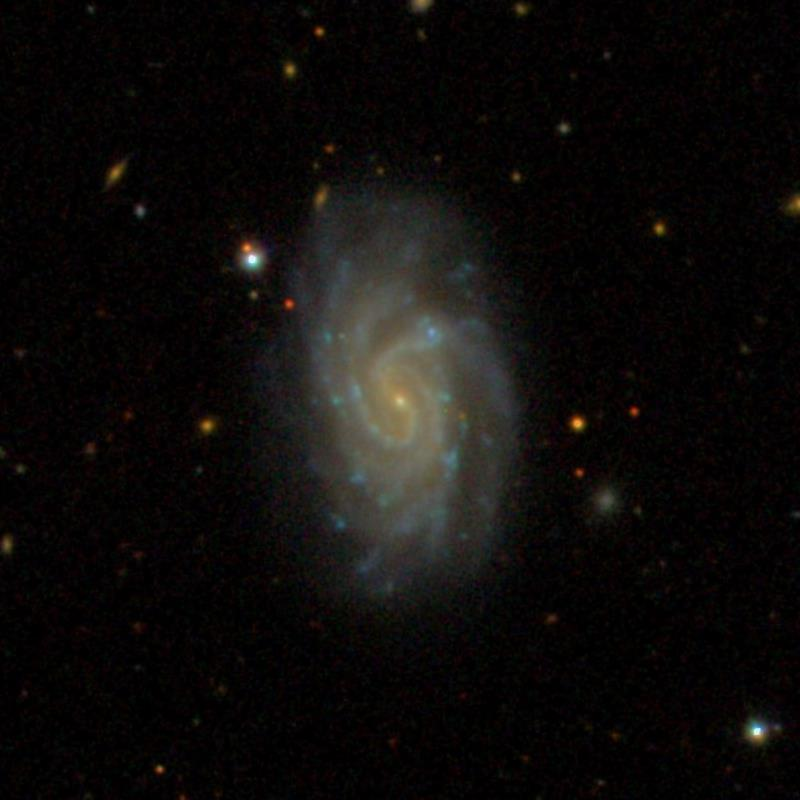
- NGC 4545 imaged by SDSS

Observation data (J2000 epoch)
- Constellation: Draco
- Right ascension: 12^{h} 34^{m} 34.1587^{s}
- Declination: +63° 31′ 30.63″
- Redshift: 0.009130
- Heliocentric radial velocity: 2,737±2 km/s
- Distance: 137.1 ± 9.6 Mly (42.04 ± 2.95 Mpc)
- Group or cluster: NGC 4545 Group (LGG 295)
- Apparent magnitude (V): 12.3

Characteristics
- Type: SB(s)cd?
- Size: ~99,700 ly (30.58 kpc) (estimated)
- Apparent size (V): 2.5′ × 1.5′

Other designations
- IRAS 12323+6348, UGC 7747, MCG +11-15-064, PGC 41838, CGCG 315-047

NGC 4545 is a barred spiral galaxy in the constellation of Draco. Its velocity with respect to the cosmic microwave background is 2,850±8 km/s, which corresponds to a Hubble distance of 137.1 ± 9.6 Mly (42.04 ± 2.95 Mpc). However, 19 non-redshift measurements give a closer mean distance of 118.22 ± 5.34 Mly (36.247 ± 1.637 Mpc). It was discovered by German-British astronomer William Herschel on 20 March 1790.

== NGC 4545 Group ==
NGC 4545 is the brightest galaxy in a group of galaxies that bears its name. The NGC 4545 group (also known as LGG 295) has at least six members, including NGC 4510, NGC 4512, NGC 4521, UGC 7848, and UGC 7941.

== Supernova ==
One supernova has been observed in NGC 4545: SN 1940D (type unknown, mag. 15) was discovered by Josef J. Johnson on 25 July 1940.

== See also ==
- List of NGC objects (4001–5000)
