= NGC 4623 =

Lenticular or elliptical galaxy in the constellation Virgo

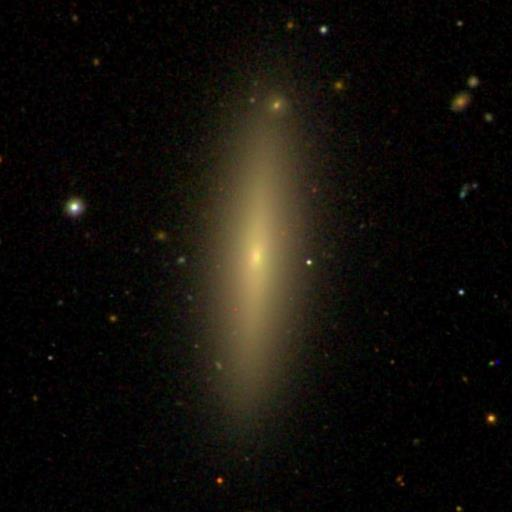
- SDSS image of NGC 4623.

Observation data (J2000 epoch)
- Constellation: Virgo
- Right ascension: 12^{h} 42^{m} 10.7^{s}
- Declination: 07° 40′ 37″
- Redshift: 0.006027/1807 km/s
- Distance: 54,889,674 ly
- Group or cluster: Virgo Cluster
- Apparent magnitude (V): 13.24

Characteristics
- Type: SB0+?, E7
- Size: ~35,751.52 ly (estimated)
- Apparent size (V): 2.2 x 0.7

Other designations
- PGC 42647, UGC 7862, VCC 1913

NGC 4623 is an edge-on lenticular or elliptical galaxy located about 54 million light-years away in the constellation of Virgo. NGC 4623 is classified as an E7, a rare type of "late" elliptical that represents the first stage of transition into a lenticular galaxy. NGC 4623 was discovered by astronomer William Herschel on April 13, 1784. NGC 4623 is a member of the Virgo Cluster.

== See also ==
- List of NGC objects (4001–5000)
- NGC 3115 - another edge-on lenticular galaxy
