= NGC 4780 =

Spiral galaxy in the constellation Virgo

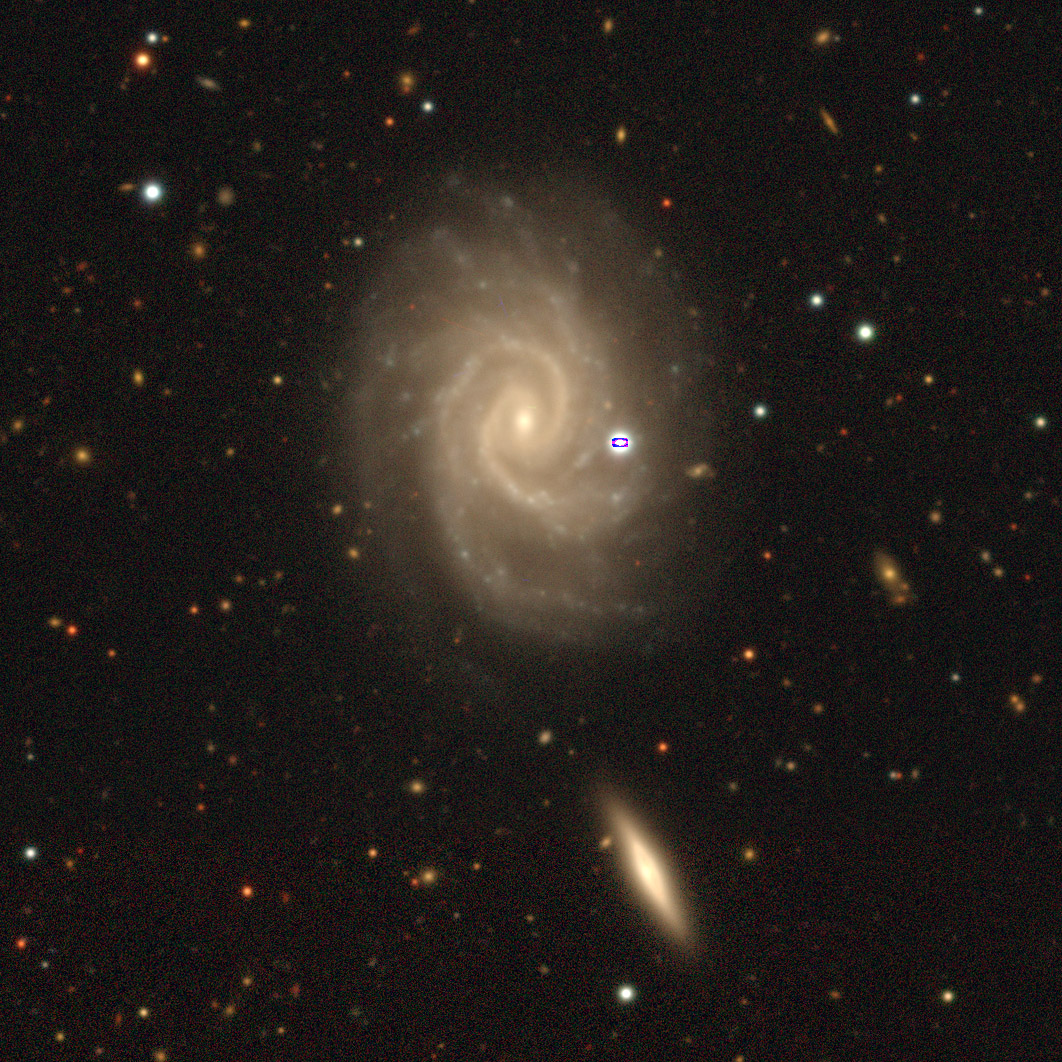
- legacy surveys image of NGC 4780

Observation data (J2000 epoch)
- Constellation: Virgo
- Right ascension: 12^{h} 54^{m} 05.240^{s}
- Declination: −08° 37′ 15.97″
- Redshift: 0.011762
- Heliocentric radial velocity: 3505.5 km/s
- Distance: 166.3 Mly (51.00 Mpc)
- Apparent magnitude (B): 13.2

Characteristics
- Type: SAB(rs)c

Other designations
- MCG -01-33-045, PGC 43870

NGC 4780 is an intermediate spiral galaxy within the constellation Virgo. It is located about 166 million light-years (51 Megaparsecs) away from the Sun. It was discovered in 1880 by the astronomer Wilhelm Tempel.
