= NGC 4145 =

Galaxy in constellation Canes Venatici

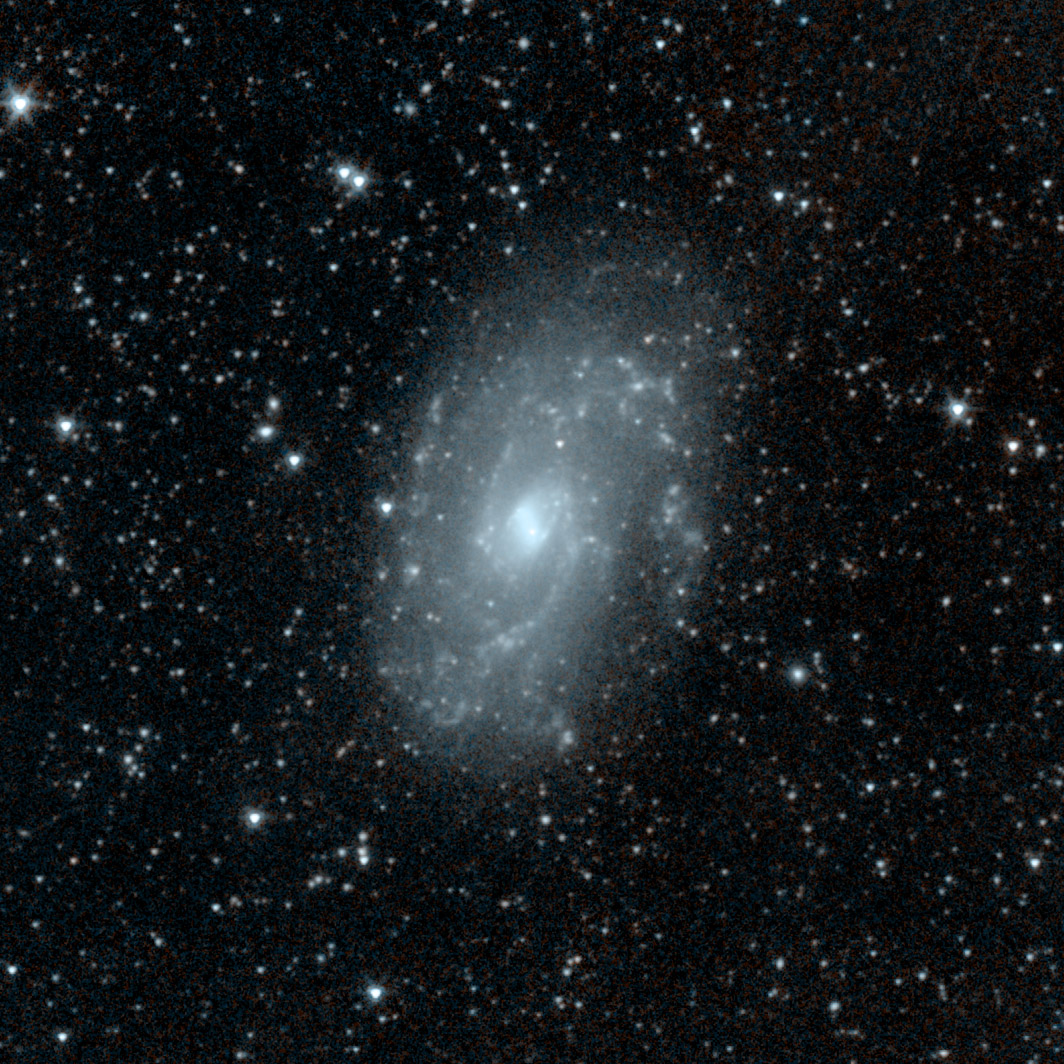
- Spitzer Space Telescope image of NGC 4145

Observation data (J2000 epoch)
- Constellation: Canes Venatici
- Right ascension: 12^{h} 10^{m} 01.52^{s}
- Declination: 39° 53′ 01.9″
- Redshift: 0.003366
- Distance: 68,000,000 light years
- Apparent magnitude (V): 11.30

Characteristics
- Type: SAB(rs)d
- Apparent size (V): 5.9' x 4.1'

Other designations
- UGC 7154, PGC 38693

NGC 4145 is a barred spiral galaxy located 68 million light years from the Earth. The galaxy has little star formation, except on its outer edges. Due to the loss of energy that occurs without star formation, some astronomers predict that the galaxy will degenerate into a lenticular galaxy in the near future. However, the galaxy's interaction with NGC 4151 may "maintain [its] star formation".

NGC 4145 is a member of the NGC 4151 Group.
