= NGC 4121 =

Dwarf elliptical galaxy in the constellation Draco

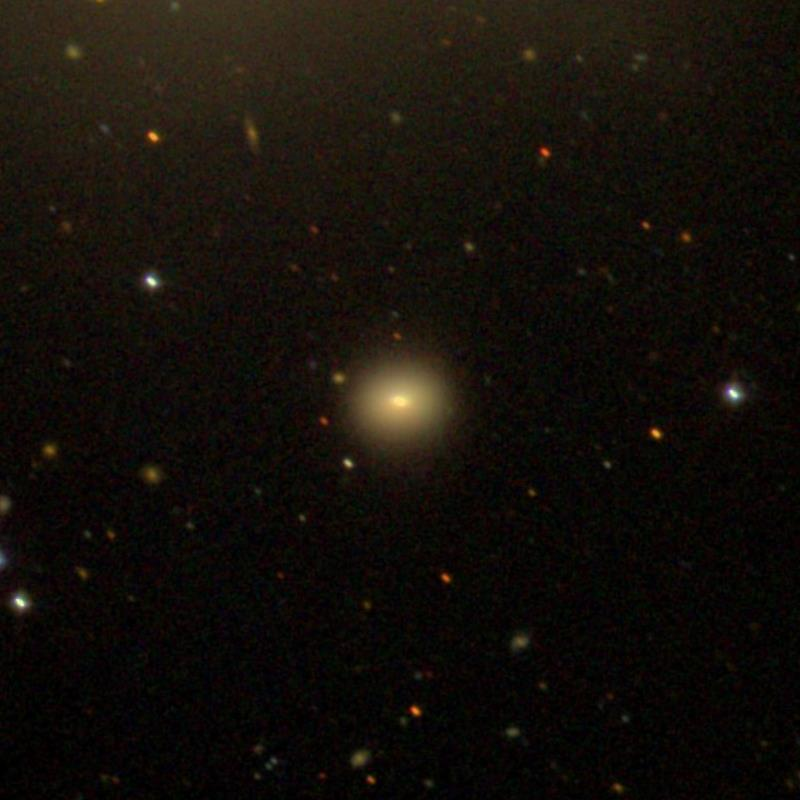
- SDSS image of NGC 4121.

Observation data (J2000 epoch)
- Constellation: Draco
- Right ascension: 12^{h} 07^{m} 56.6^{s}
- Declination: +65° 06′ 50″
- Redshift: 1414 ± 12 km/s
- Apparent magnitude (V): 14.2

Characteristics
- Type: E
- Apparent size (V): 0.6′ × 0.62′

Other designations
- PGC 38508

NGC 4121 is a dwarf elliptical galaxy in the constellation Draco.
