= NGC 4380 =

Galaxy in the constellation Virgo

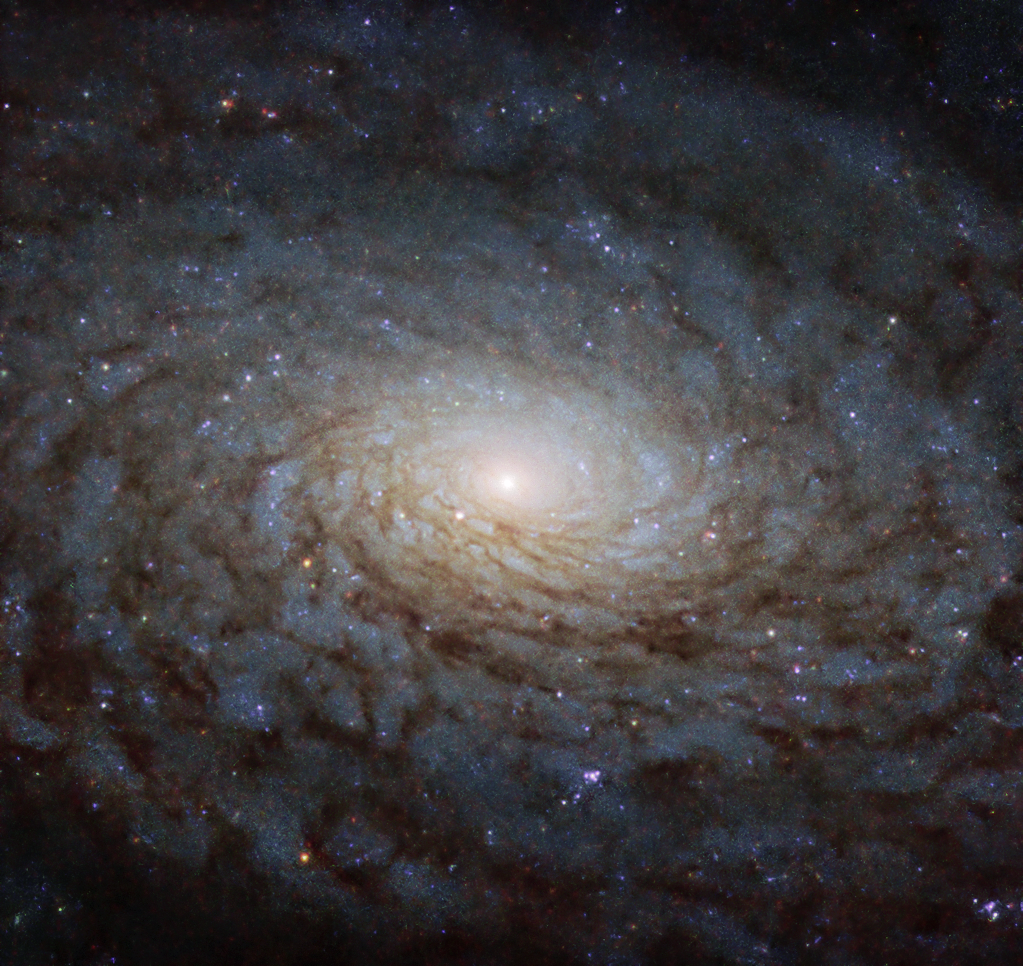
- NGC 4380 taken by Hubble.

Observation data (J2000 epoch)
- Constellation: Virgo
- Right ascension: 12^{h} 25^{m} 22.178^{s}
- Declination: 10° 01′ 00.14″
- Redshift: 0.00319
- Heliocentric radial velocity: 955 km/s
- Distance: 52.2 Mly (16.00 Mpc)
- Group or cluster: Virgo Cluster
- Apparent magnitude (V): 11.30
- Apparent magnitude (B): 12.28

Characteristics
- Type: SA(rs)b:?

Other designations
- UGC 7503, MCG +02-32-037, PGC 40507

NGC 4380 is an unbarred spiral galaxy located in the constellation of Virgo. Located about 52.2 million light-years (16 Megaparsecs) away, is a member of the Virgo Cluster, a large galaxy cluster. It was discovered on March 10, 1826, by the astronomer John Herschel.

== Gallery ==
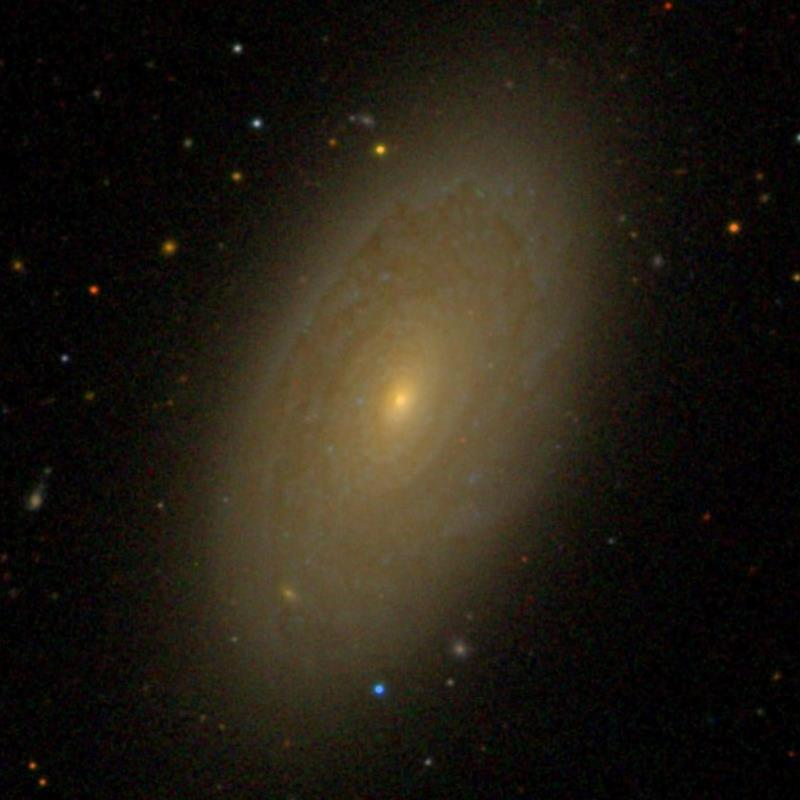
NGC 4380 (SDSS DR14)

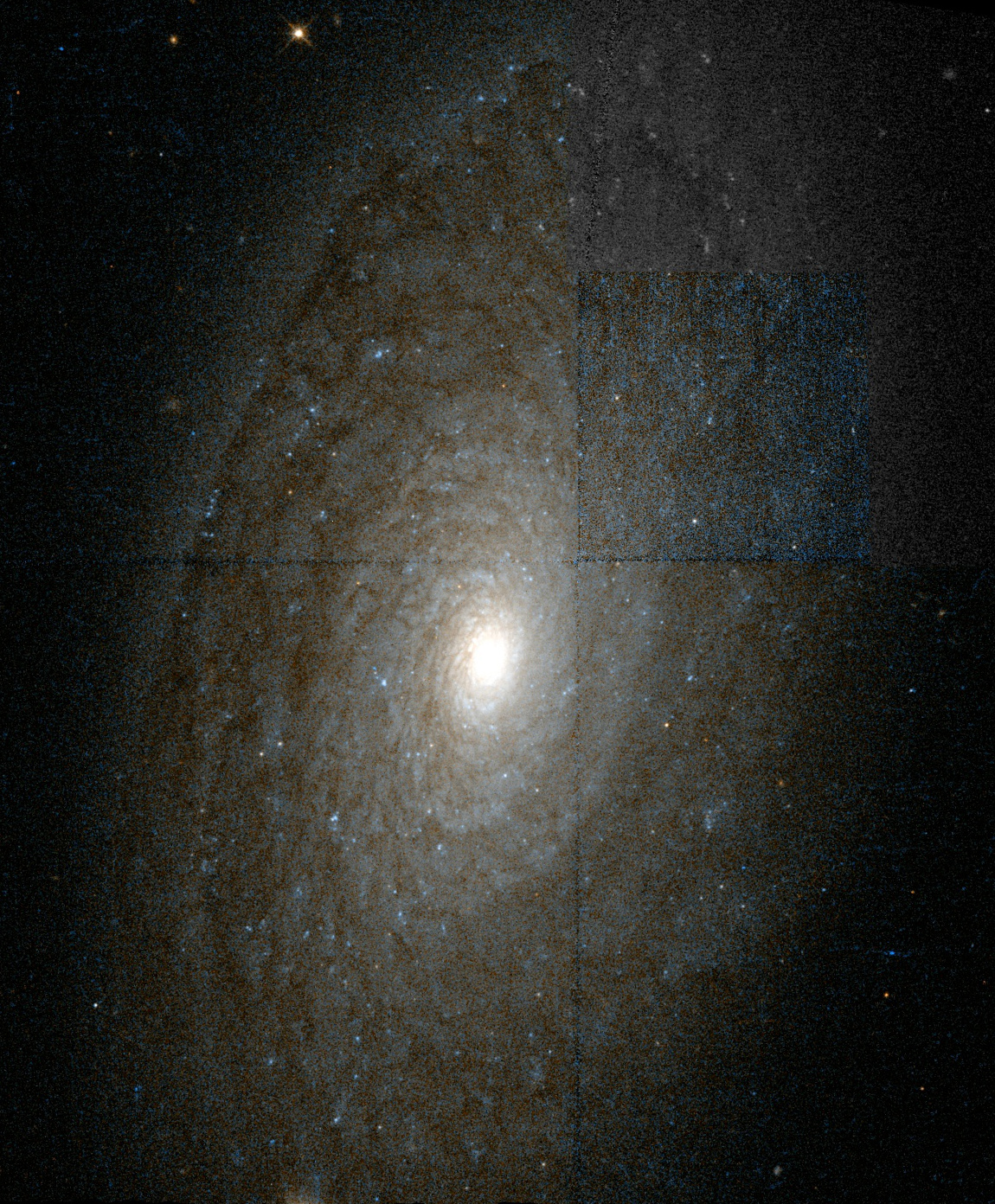
NGC 4380 (HST)
