= NGC 4502 =

Galaxy in the constellation of Virgo

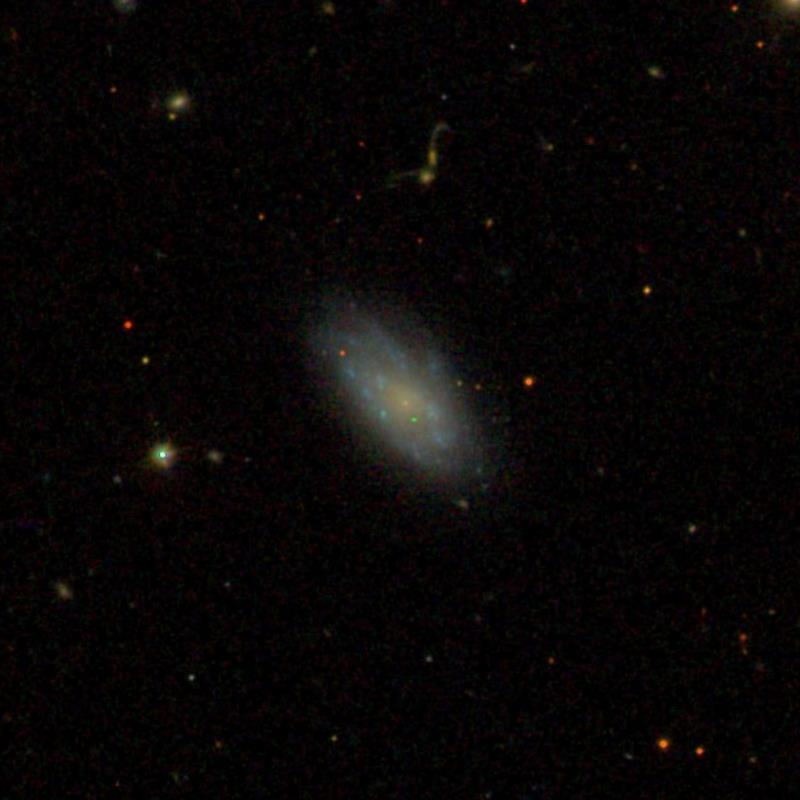

Observation data (J2000 epoch)
- Constellation: Coma Berenices
- Right ascension: 12^{h} 32^{m} 03.3^{s}
- Declination: +16° 41′ 16″
- Redshift: 0.005424
- Heliocentric radial velocity: 1626 km/s
- Distance: 103.33 ± 8.00 Mly (31.680 ± 2.453 Mpc)
- Apparent magnitude (B): 14.8

Characteristics
- Type: SAc

Other designations
- UGC 7677, MCG +3-32-60, PGC 41531

NGC 4502 is a spiral galaxy located in the constellation Coma Berenices, originally discovered by William Herschel on March 21, 1784. The galaxy features a broad HI line. In the background and to the celestial north of the galaxy, two uncatalogued, distant colliding galaxies can be seen. NGC 4502 is approximately 103.33 million light-years away from Earth.

== See also ==
- New General Catalogue
