= NGC 4999 =

Galaxy in the constellation Virgo

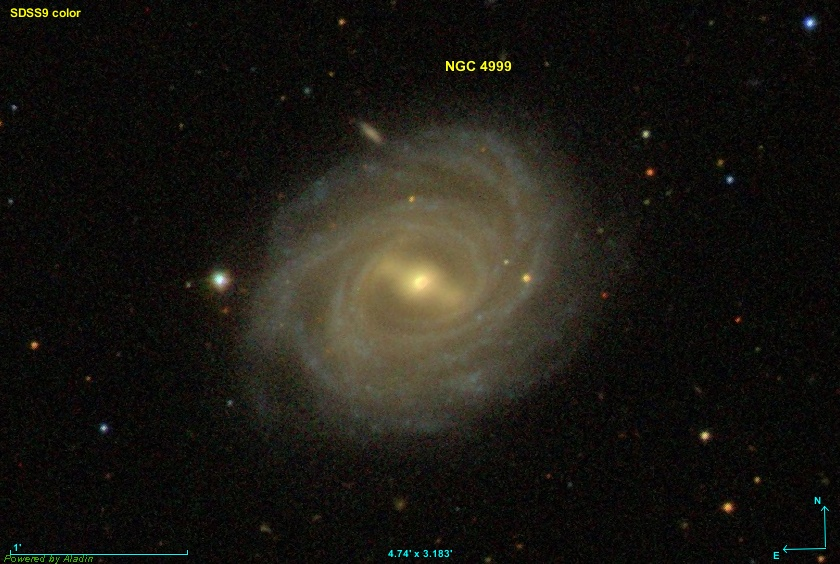

Observation data (J2000 epoch)
- Constellation: Virgo
- Right ascension: 13^{h} 09^{m} 33.131^{s}
- Declination: 01° 40′ 23.01″
- Redshift: 0.01879
- Heliocentric radial velocity: 5633 ± 2 km/s
- Distance: 257 Mly (78.7 Mpc)
- Apparent magnitude (B): 13.5

Characteristics
- Type: SB(r)b
- Apparent size (V): 2.3' × 1.9'

Other designations
- UGC 8236, MCG +00-34-010, PGC 45632

NGC 4999 is a barred spiral galaxy located in the constellation Virgo, first discovered February 24, 1786 by astronomer William Herschel. The galaxy is noted as a particularly bright ultraviolet light source – it is believed that its notable bar structure suppresses star formation, indicating this ultraviolet light may possibly be due to a quasi-stellar object.

== See also ==
- New General Catalogue
