= NGC 4918 =

Spiral galaxy in the constellation Virgo

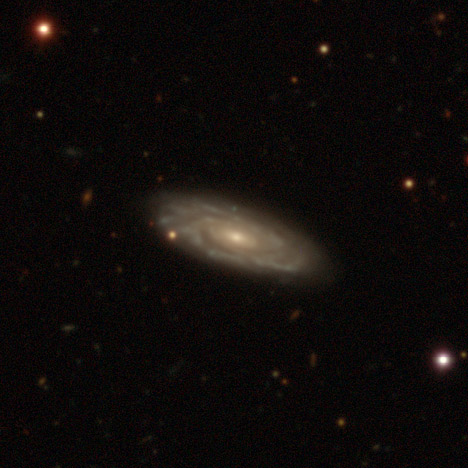
- NGC 4918 with legacy surveys

Observation data (J2000 epoch)
- Constellation: Virgo
- Right ascension: 13^{h} 01^{m} 50.629^{s}
- Declination: −04° 30′ 02.01″
- Redshift: 9833 km/s
- Heliocentric radial velocity: 0.032800
- Apparent magnitude (V): 15.1

Characteristics
- Type: SA0^{+}:
- Size: 135,900 ly (41,660 pc) (Note: RC3 D_{25}; R_{25} (blue) values used.)
- Apparent size (V): 1.0′ × 0.5′

Other designations
- NGC 3411, PGC 44934

NGC 4918 is a spiral galaxy in the constellation Virgo. The object was discovered in 1886 by the American astronomer Francis Preserved Leavenworth.
