= NGC 4980 =

Spiral galaxy in the constellation Hydra

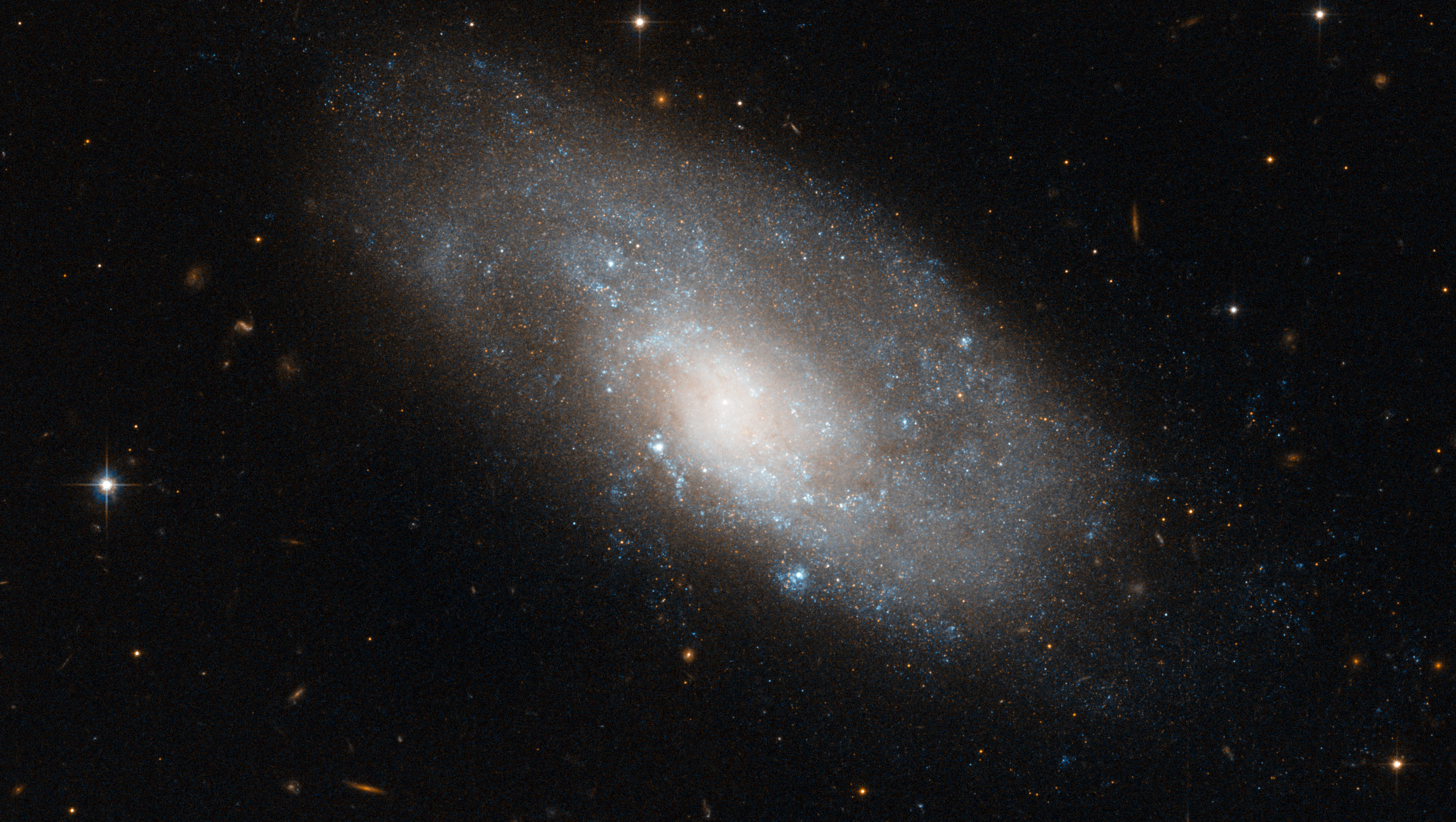
- Image from the NASA/ESA Hubble Space Telescope shows NGC 4980, a spiral galaxy in the southern constellation of Hydra.

Observation data (J2000 epoch)
- Constellation: Hydra
- Right ascension: 13^{h} 09^{m} 10.082^{s}
- Declination: −28° 38′ 30.44″
- Redshift: 0.004783
- Heliocentric radial velocity: 1430 ± 27 km/s
- Distance: 80 Million ly
- Apparent magnitude (V): 1.270 x 0.914 arcmin

Characteristics
- Type: Sa

Other designations
- FLASH J130910.34-283822.9, 2MASX J13091008-2838304, SGC 130626-2822.4, AM 1306-282, HIPASS J1309-28, MCG-05-31-037, SINGG HIPASS J1309-28, 6dFGS gJ130910.1-283830, IRAS 13064-2822, NVSS J130909-283814, ESO 443-75, IRAS F13064-2822, PSCz Q13064-2822, ESO-LV 443-0750, LEDA 45596, QRM 1305-28 1
- References: 2006AJ....131.1163S, 2002LEDA.........0P, 1989ESOLV.C......0L

NGC 4980 is a spiral galaxy in the southern constellation of Hydra. The shape of NGC 4980 appears slightly deformed, something which is often a sign of recent tidal interactions with another galaxy. In this galaxy's case, however, this appears not to be the case as there are no other galaxies in its immediate vicinity.

== Gallery ==
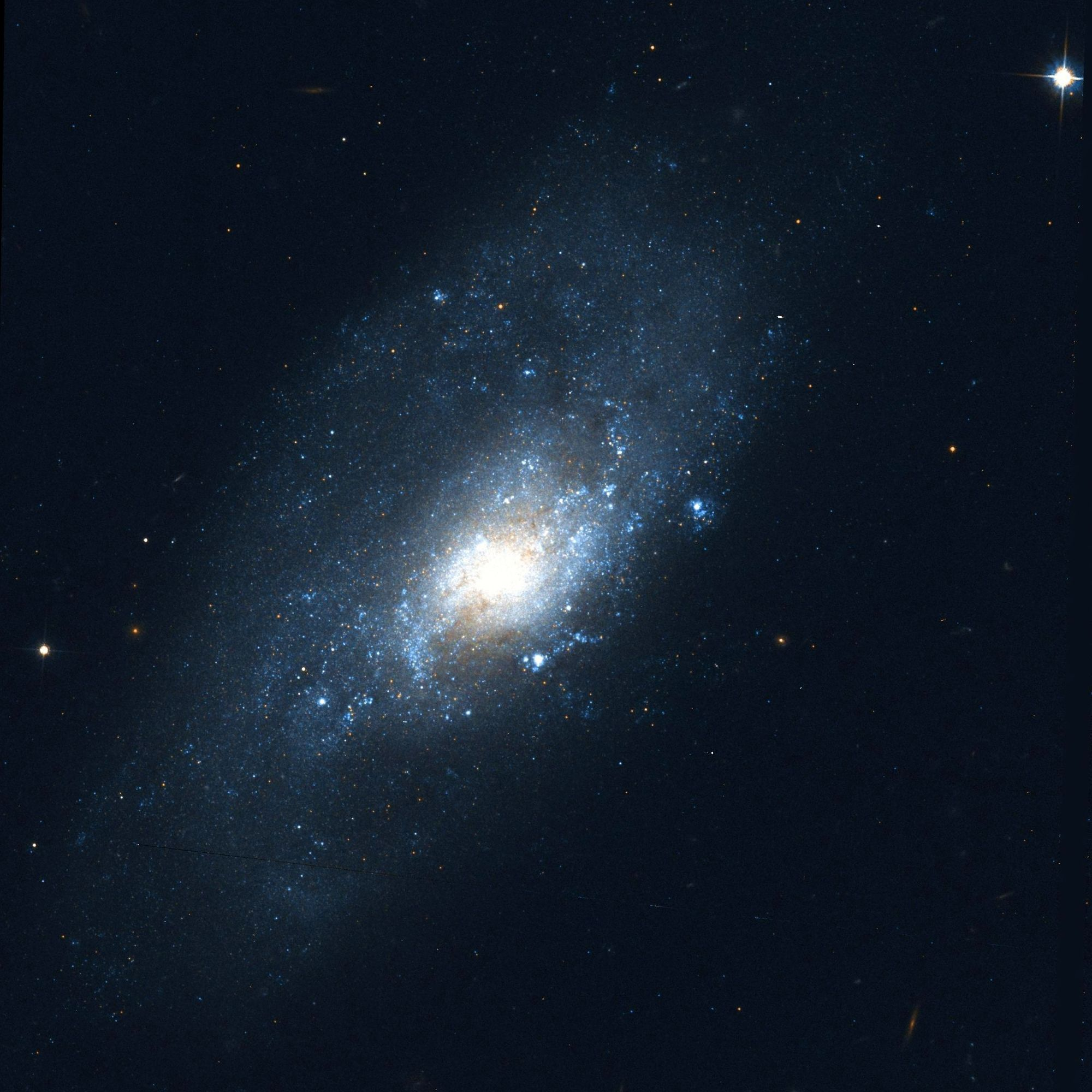
NGC 4980 by Hubble Space Telescope

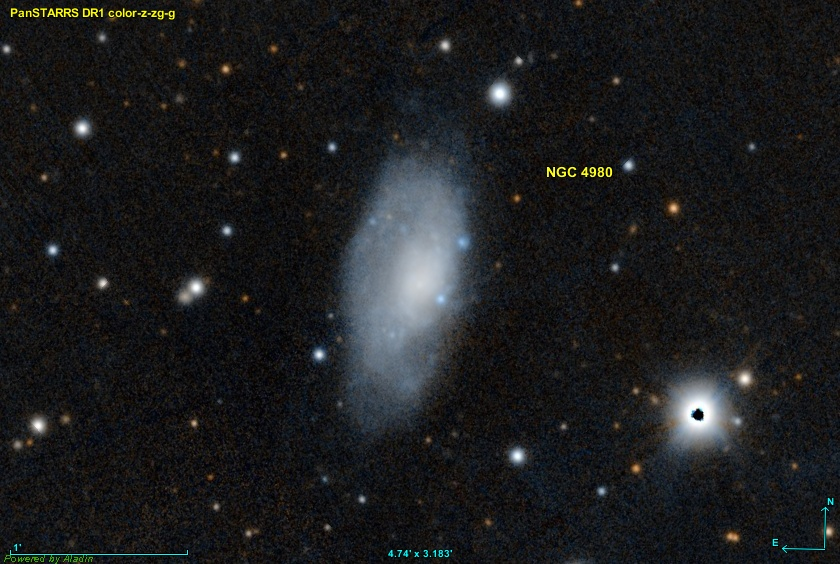
Pan-STARRS image of NGC 4980
