= List of Hubble Space Telescope anniversary images =

Images of hubble

This is a list of images released to celebrate the Hubble Space Telescope's anniversaries. They celebrate its "birthday" when it was launched into orbit on April 24, 1990, by the crew of Space Shuttle Discovery.

== 15th (2005) ==
The 15th anniversary, in 2005, was celebrated with a collection of images of M51 (the Whirlpool Galaxy), and also with a section of the Eagle Nebula. The 15th anniversary included a collection of other content including, in multiple languages, the video release, Hubble — 15 Years of Discovery.

15th anniversary image - 2005 – M51, the Whirlpool Galaxy, including NGC 5194 and NGC 5195.

== 16th (2006) ==
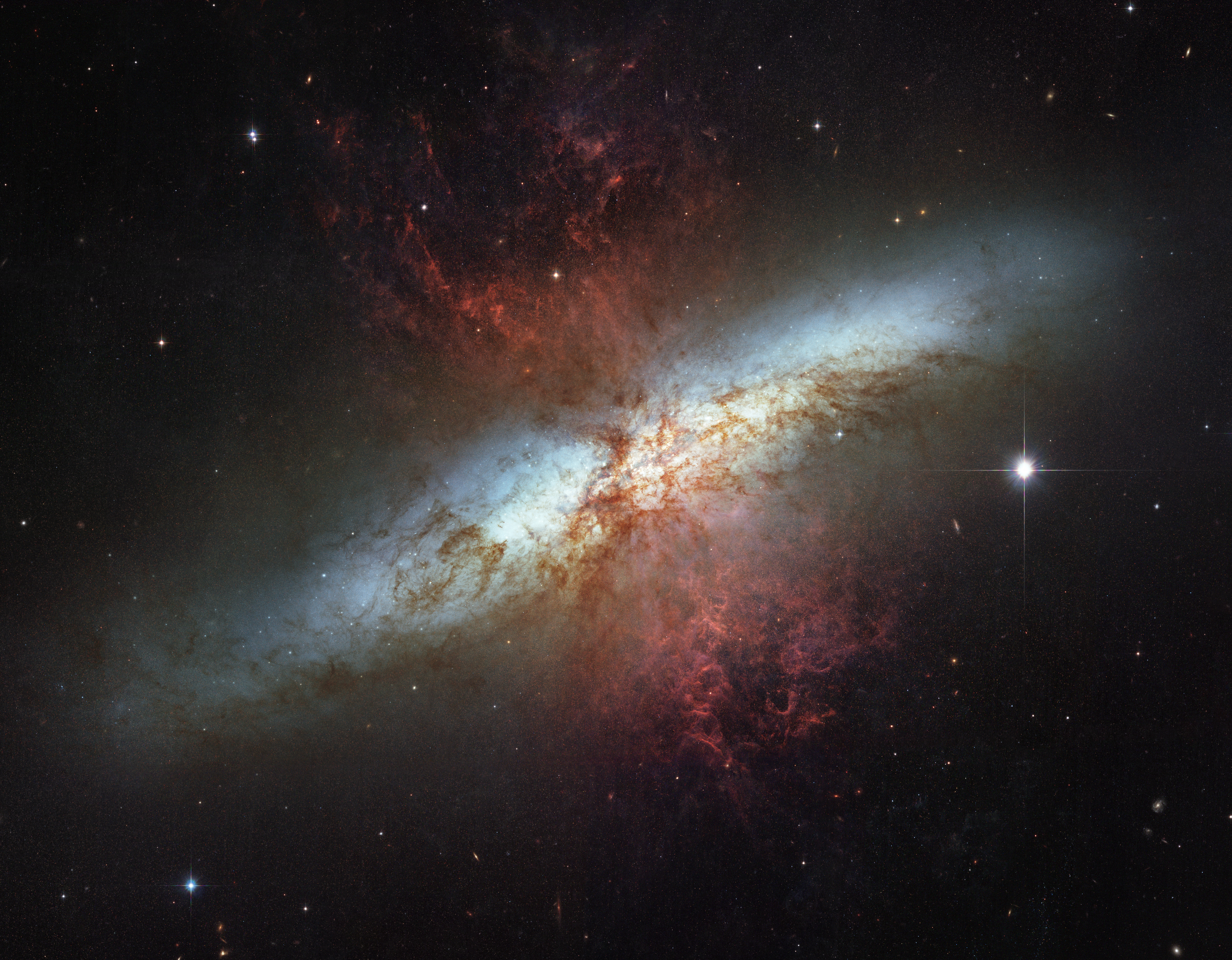
16th anniversary image - 2006 – the Cigar Galaxy

== 17th (2007) ==
The 17th-anniversary celebration featured a panorama of part of the Carina Nebula, and a collection of images selected from that area.

In its 17 years of exploring the heavens, NASA's Hubble Space Telescope has made nearly 800,000 observations and snapped nearly 500,000 images of more than 25,000 celestial objects. Hubble does not travel to stars, planets and galaxies. It takes pictures of them as it whirls around Earth at 17,500 miles an hour. In its 17-year lifetime, the telescope has made nearly 100,000 trips around our planet.

— 17th Anniversary Press release

17th anniversary image - 2007 – part of the Carina Nebula including the star system WR 22 and open cluster (stars) Trumpler 14

== 18th (2008) ==
59 images of merging galaxies were released for the 18th anniversary on 24 April 2008.

== 19th (2009) ==
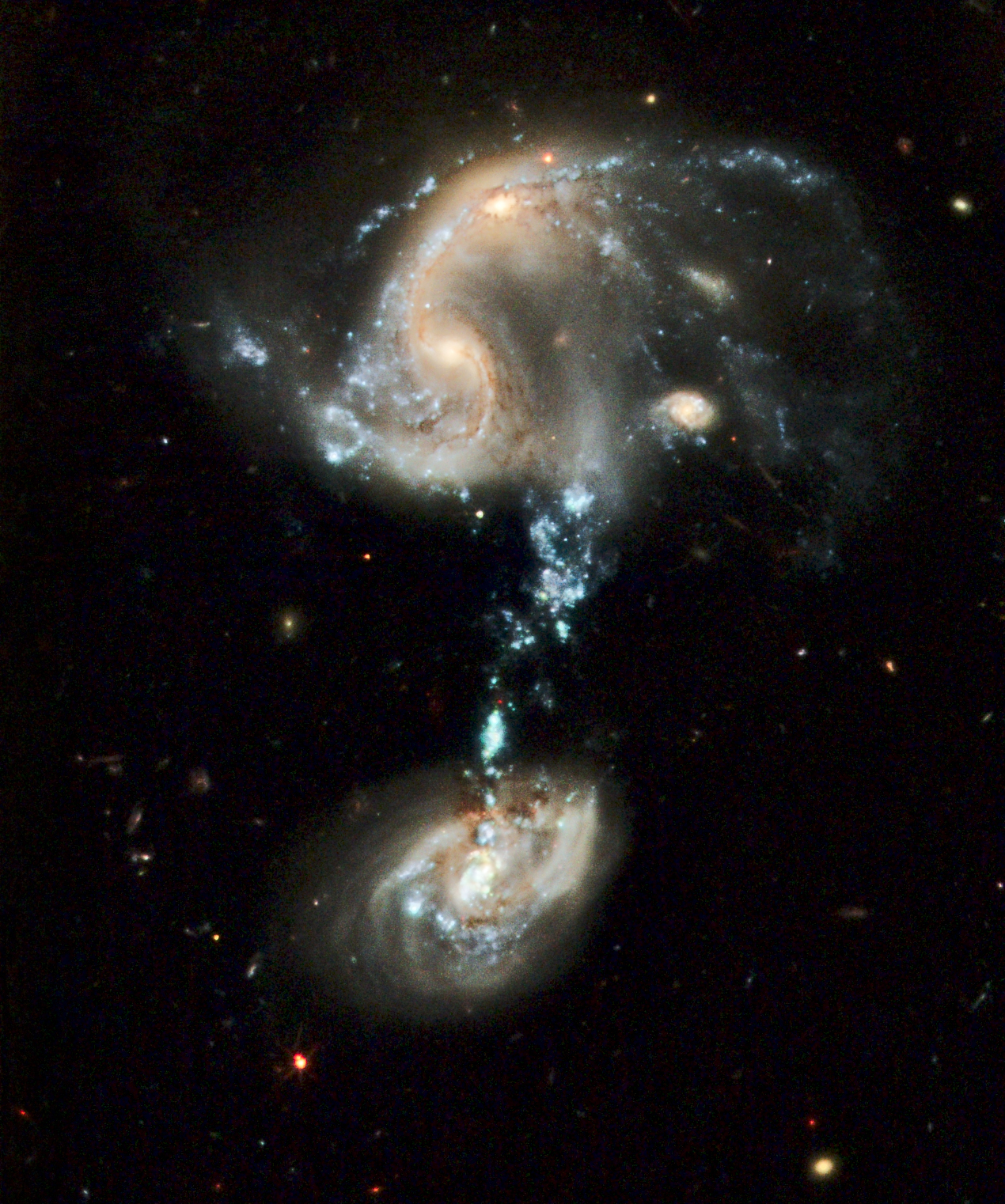
19th anniversary image - 2009 – Arp 194

== 20th (2010) ==
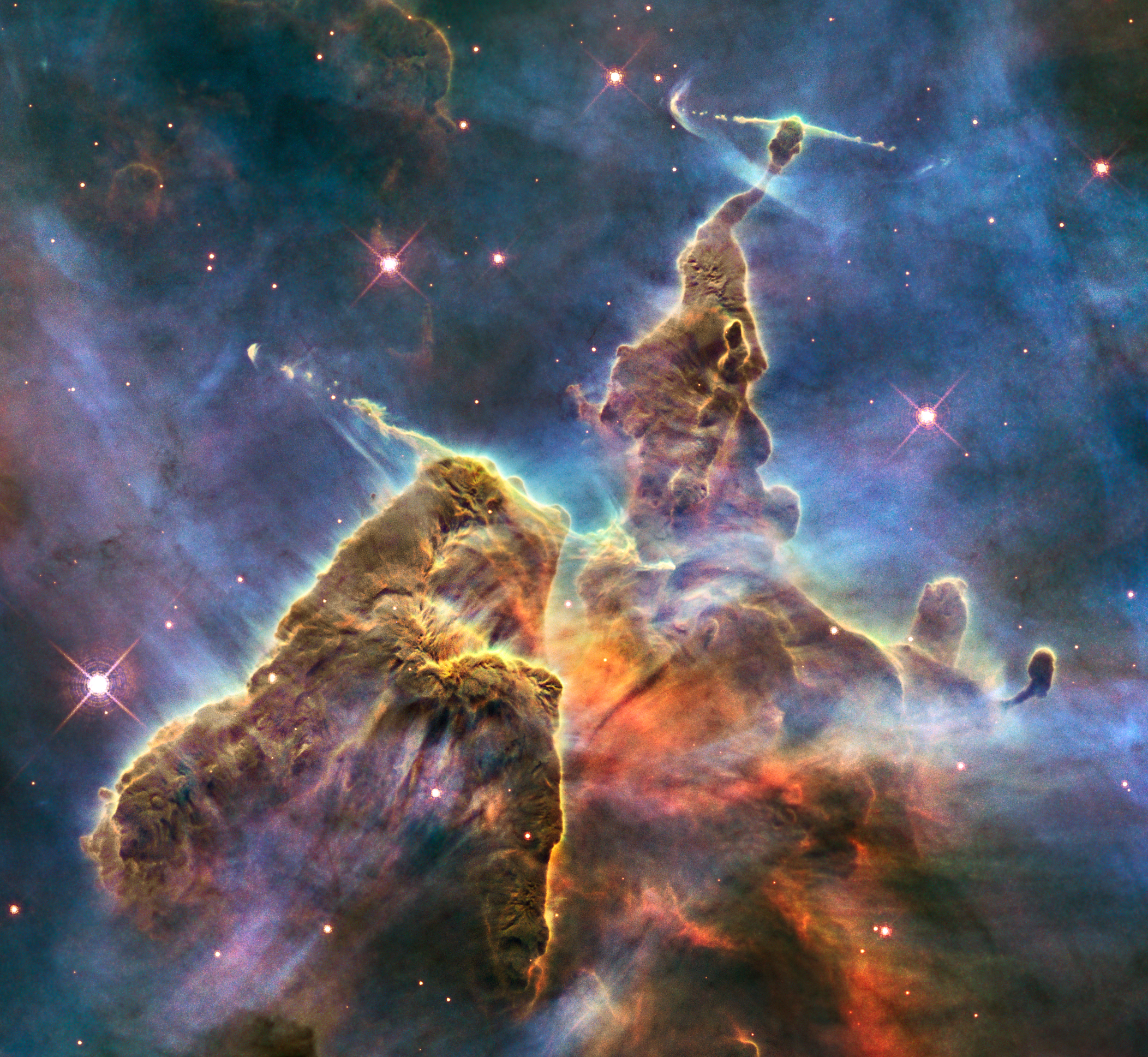
20th anniversary image - 2010 – 'Mystic Mountain' in the Carina Nebula

== 21st (2011) ==
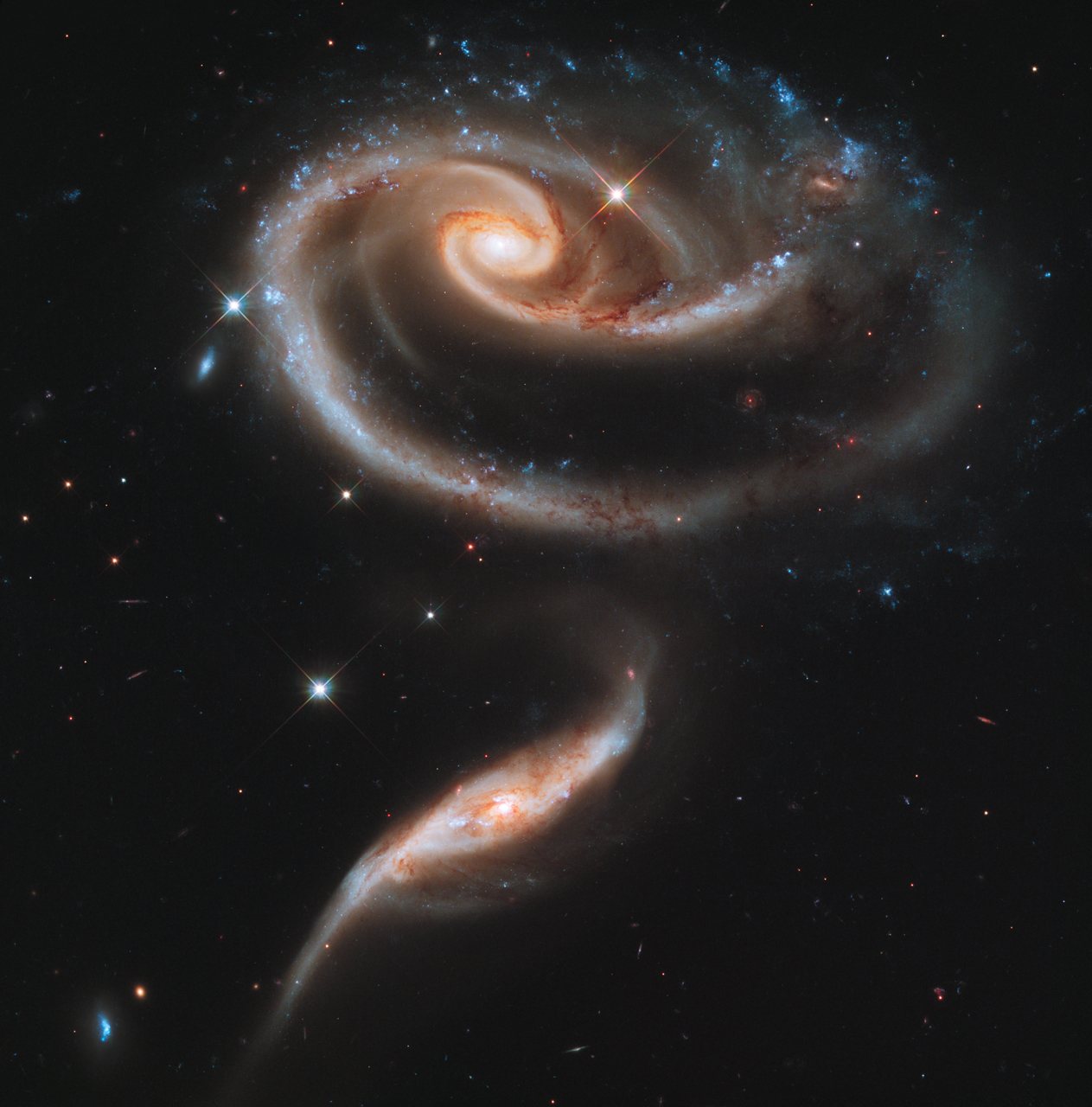
21st anniversary image - 2011 – Arp 273, which includes UGC 1810 and UGC 1813, called a "rose" of galaxies in this release.

== 22nd (2012) ==
22nd anniversary image - 2012 – 30 Doradus in the Tarantula Nebula

== 23rd (2013) ==
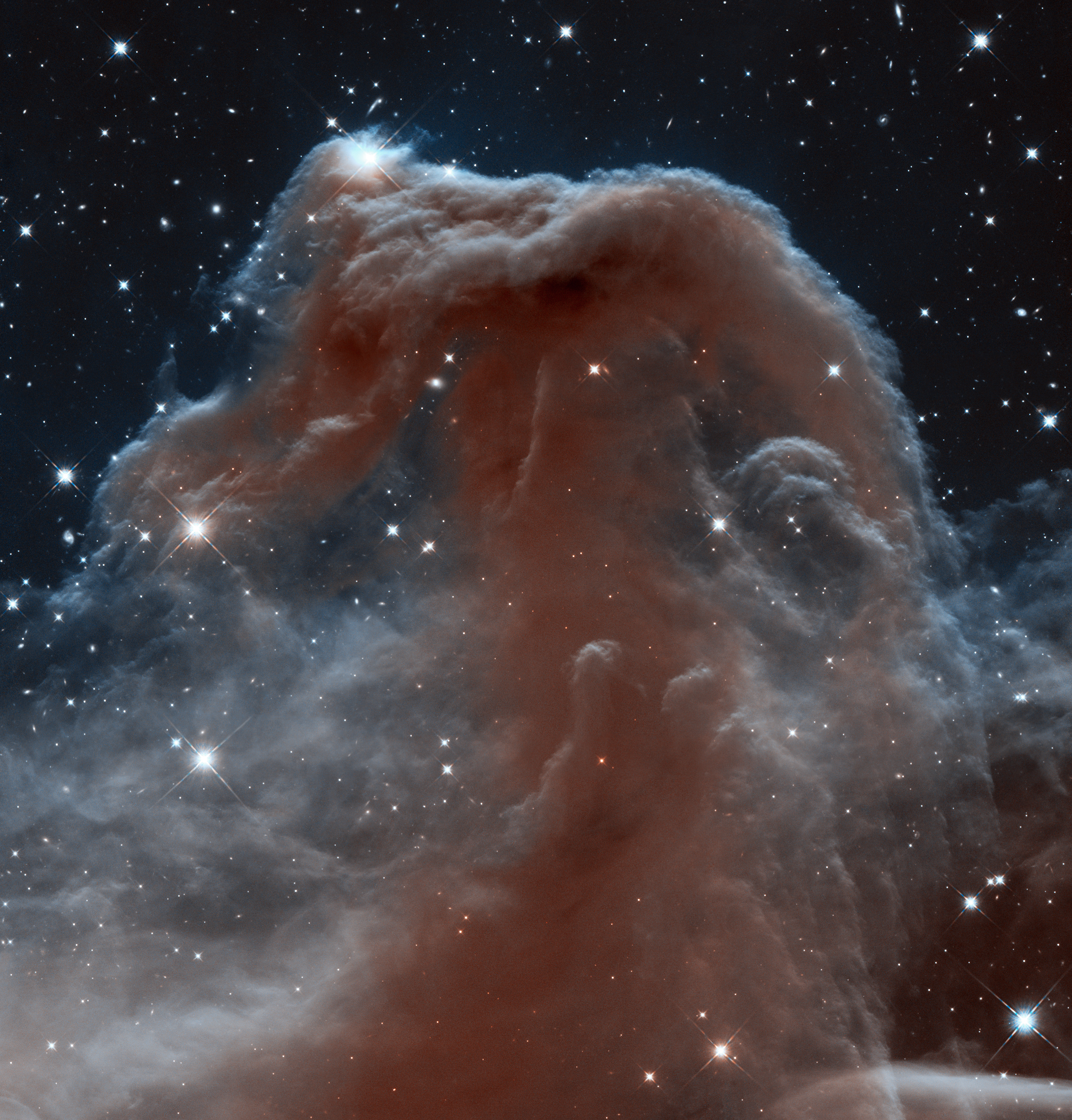
23rd anniversary image - 2013 – Horsehead Nebula in infrared light

== 24th (2014) ==
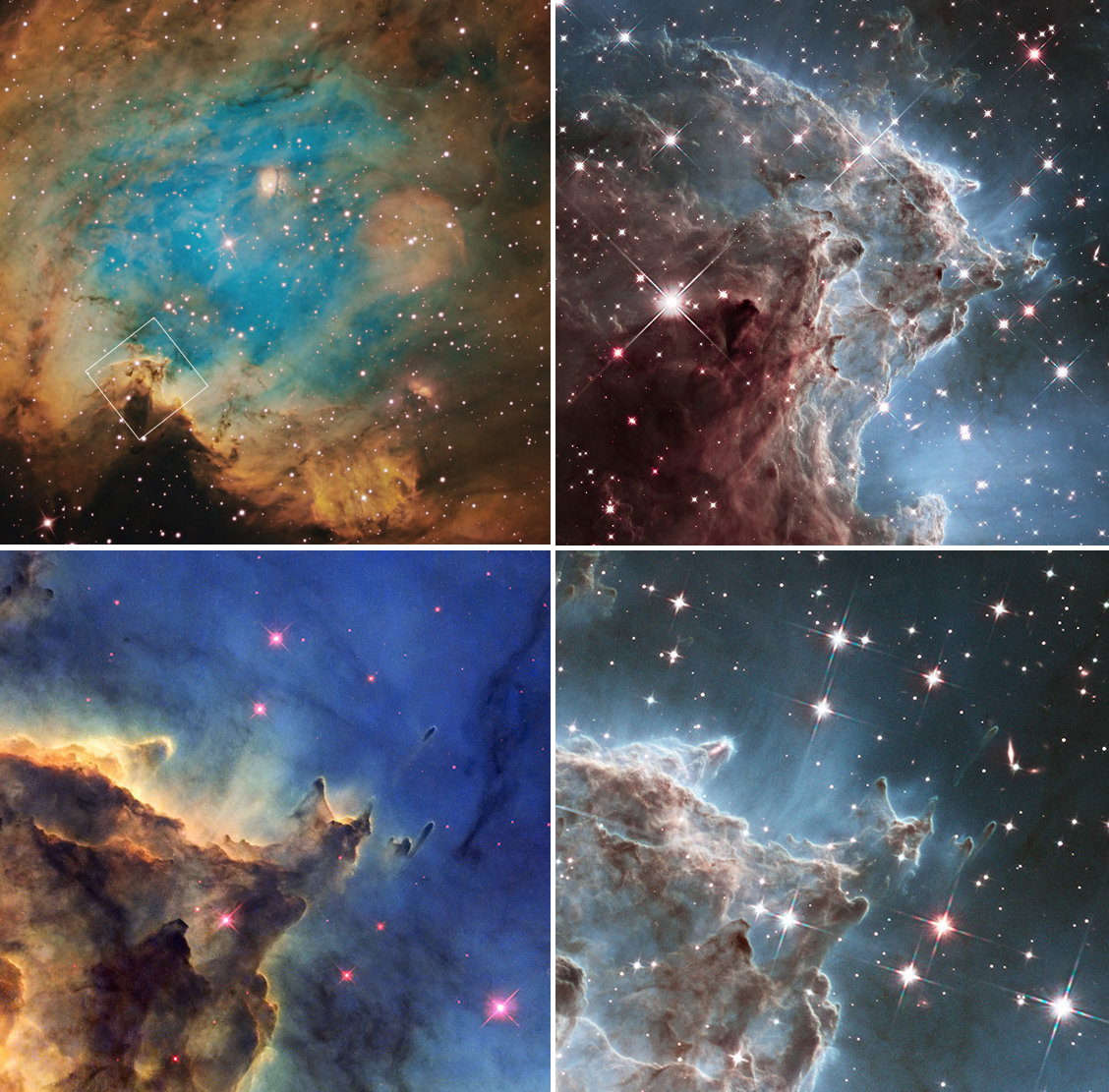
24th anniversary image - 2014 – A set of Infrared images of Monkey Head Nebula including NGC 2174 and Sharpless Sh2-252

== 25th (2015) ==
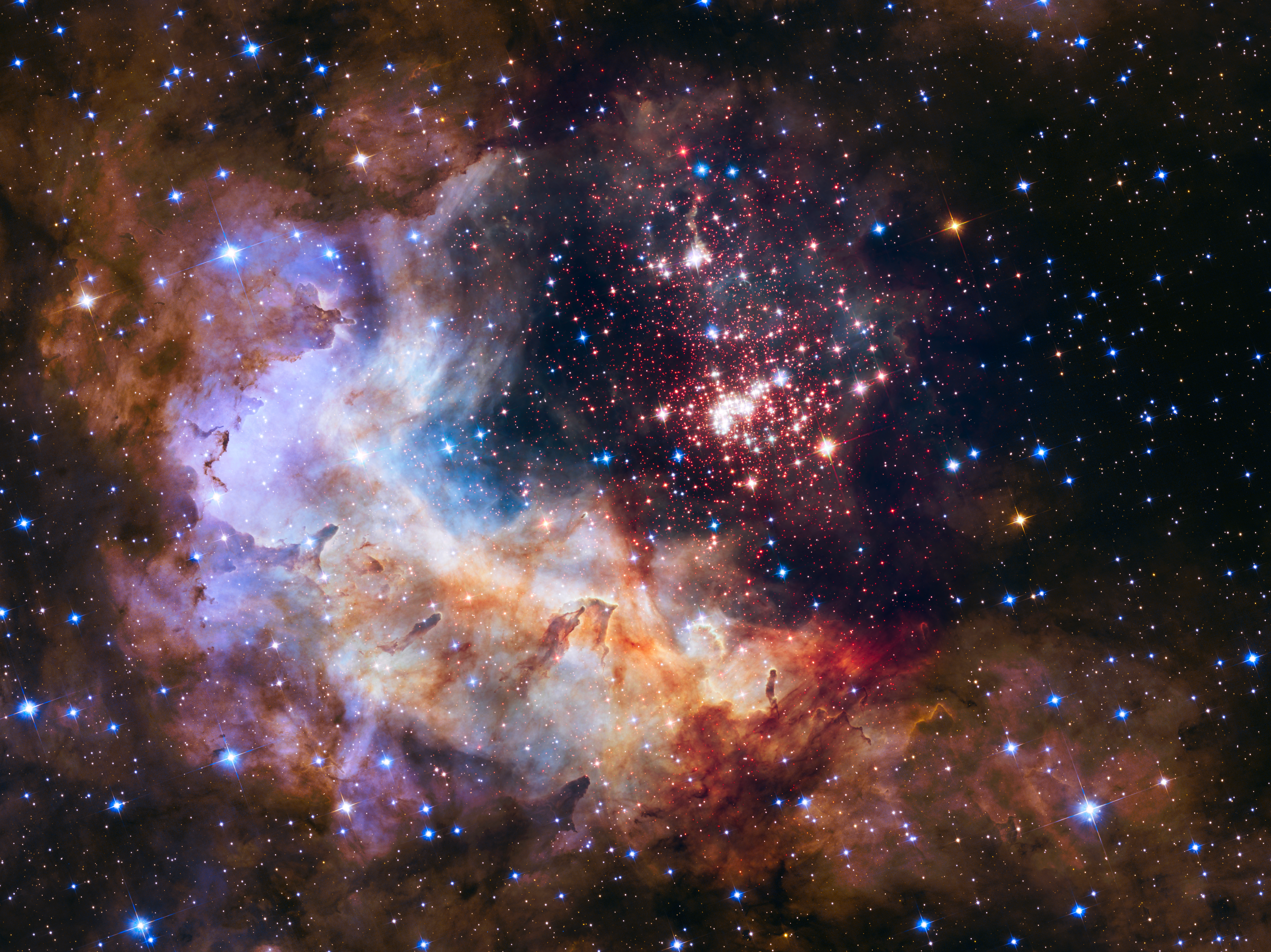
25th anniversary image - April 2015 – Westerlund 2

== 26th (2016) ==
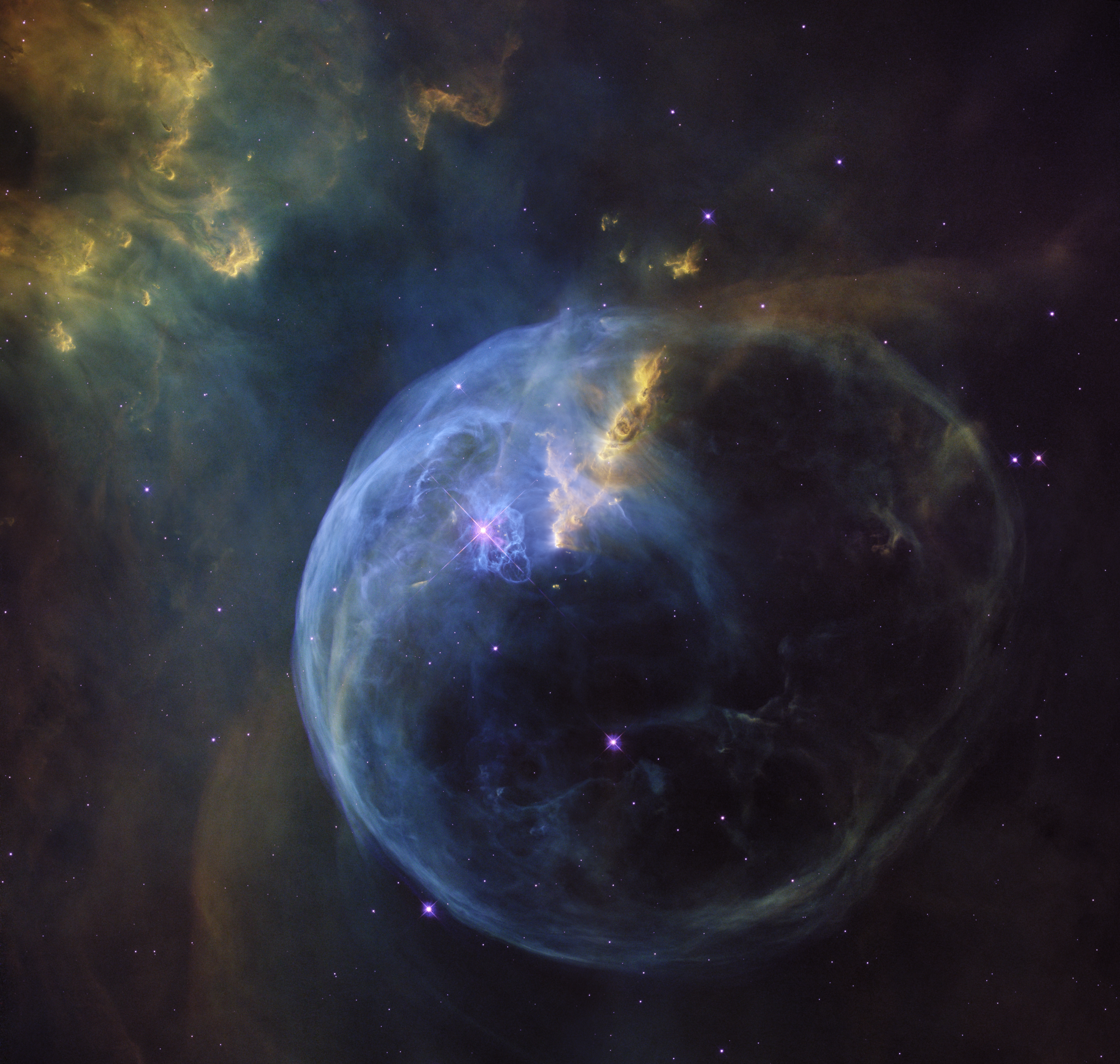
26th anniversary image - April 2016 – the Bubble Nebula

== 27th (2017) ==
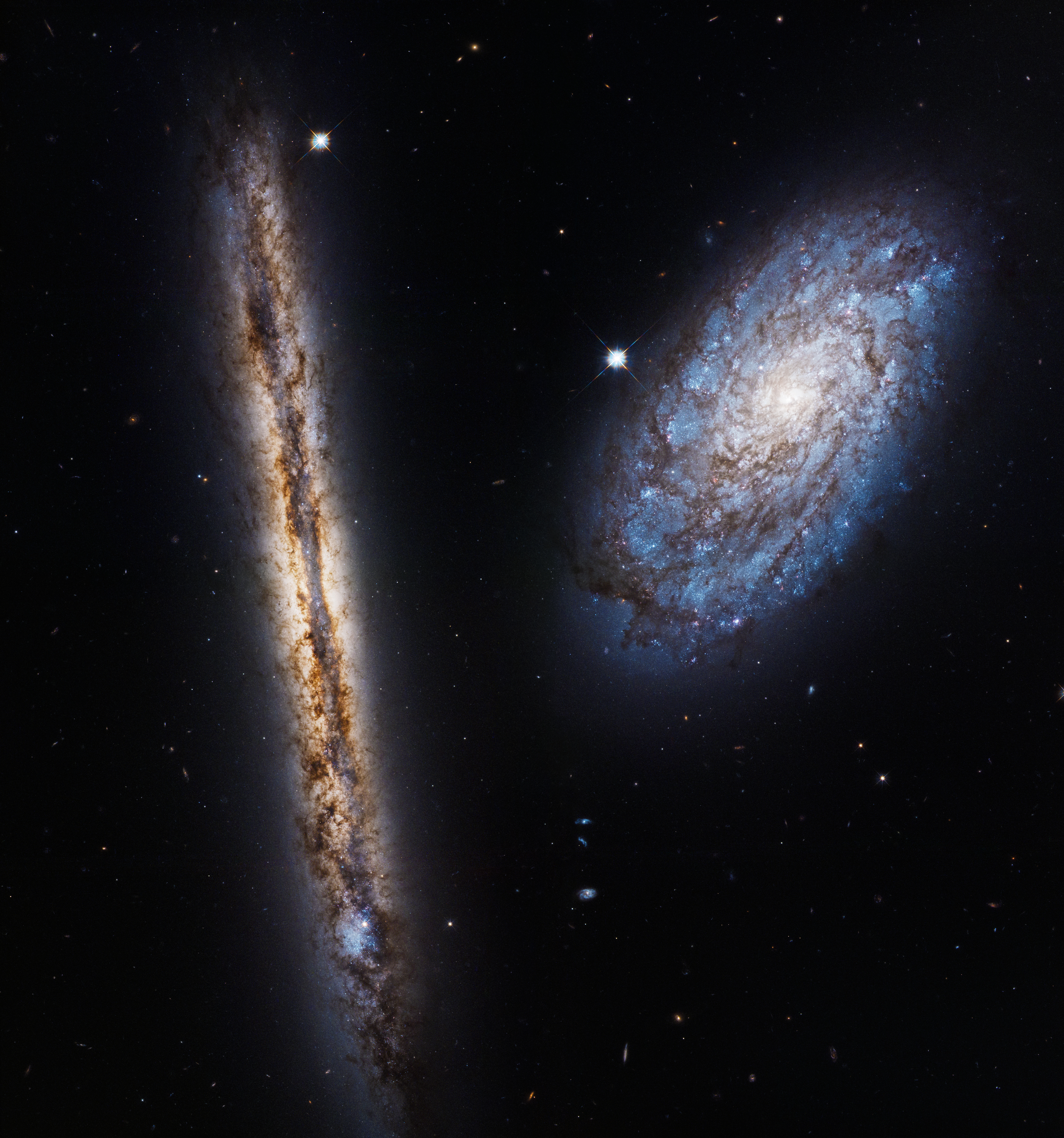
27th anniversary image - April 2017 – Interacting galaxies NGC 4302 and NGC 4298

== 28th (2018) ==
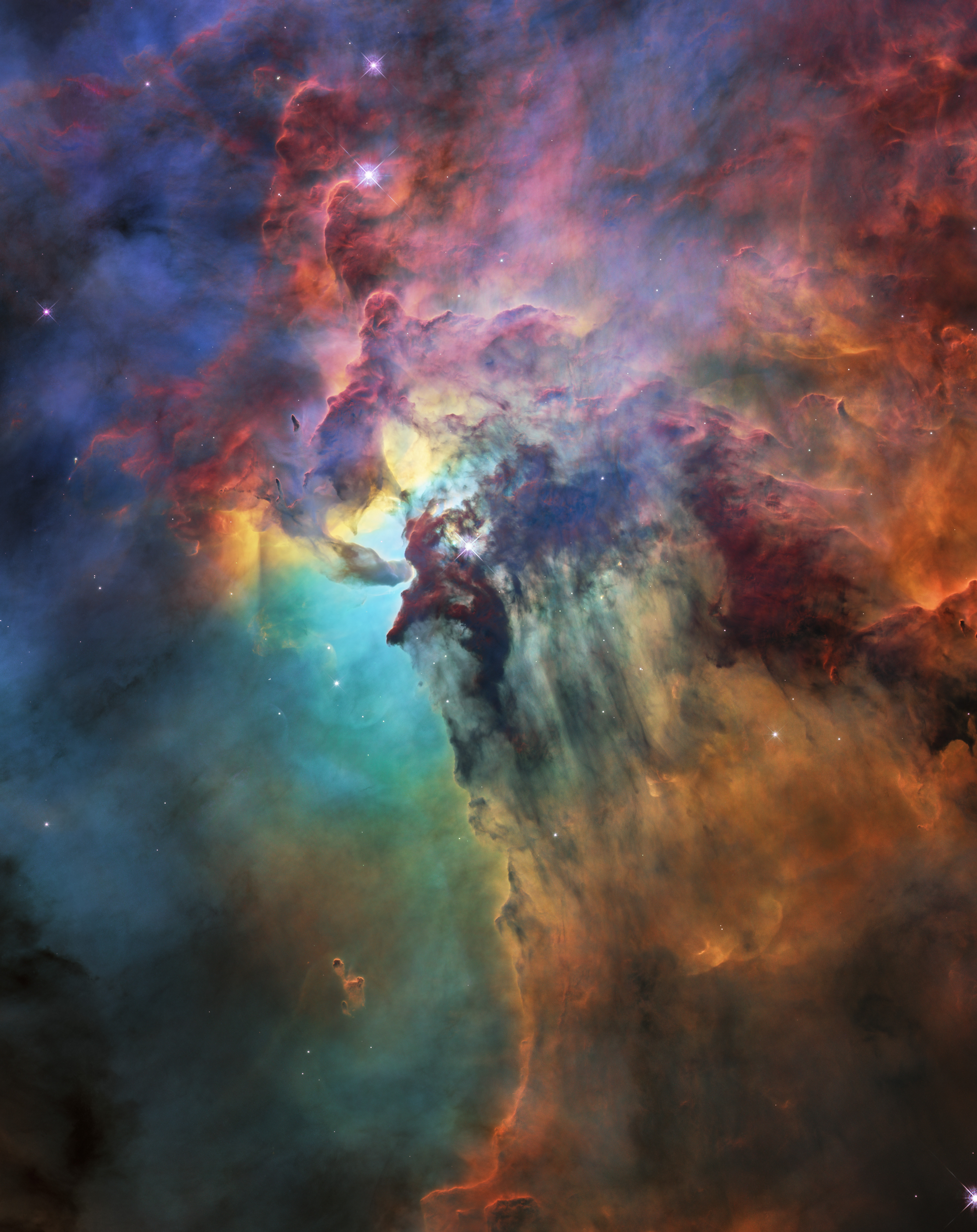
28th anniversary image - April 2018 – A portion of the Lagoon Nebula

== 29th (2019) ==
In April 2019, a special celebration image of the Southern Crab Nebula (aka Hen 2-104) was released. This nebula is located in the Constellation Centaurus.

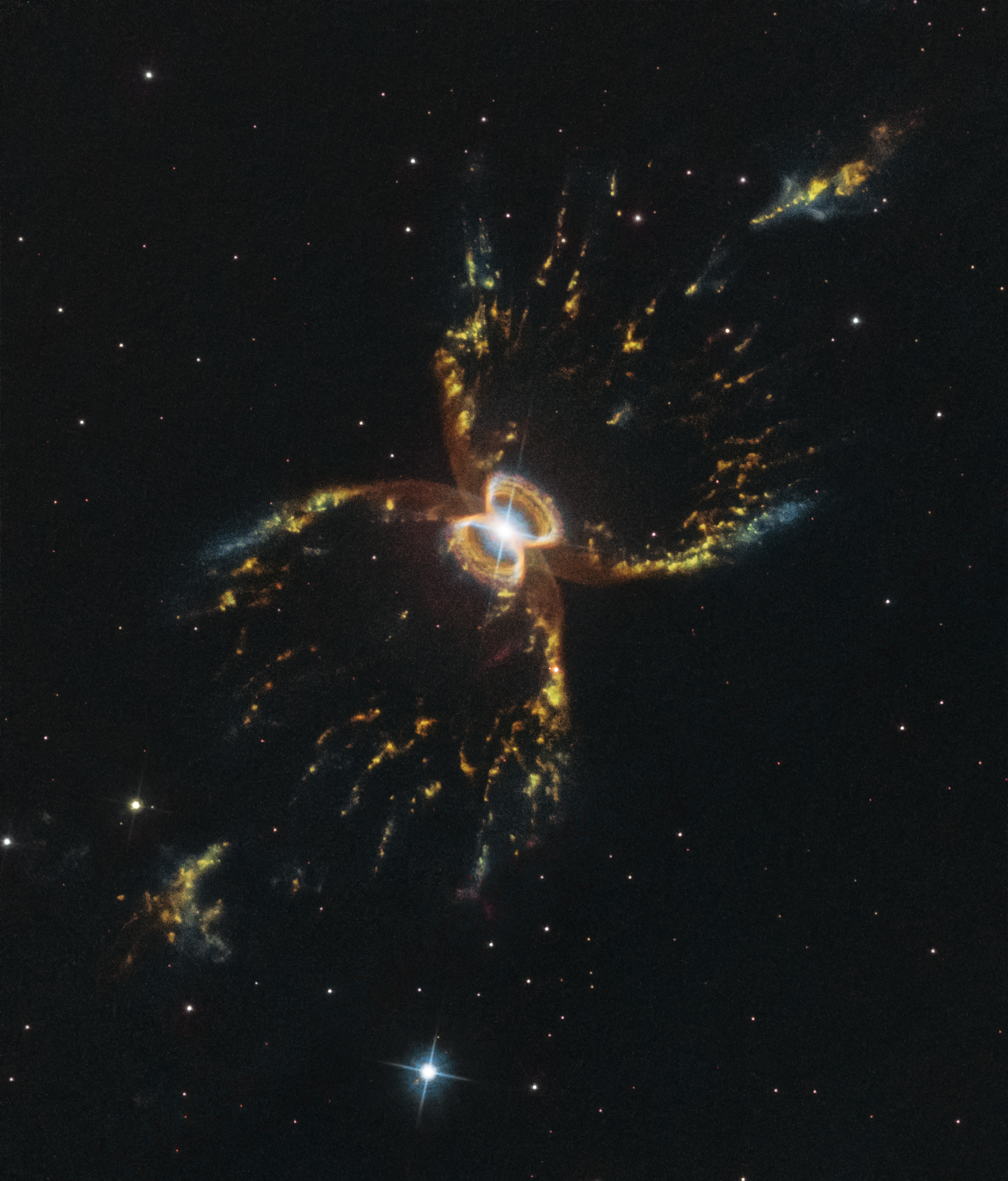
29th anniversary image - April 2019 – The Southern Crab Nebula

== 30th (2020) ==
30th anniversary image - April 2020 – The portrait features the giant nebula NGC 2014 and its neighbour NGC 2020 which together form part of a vast star-forming region in the Large Magellanic Cloud.

== 31st (2021) ==
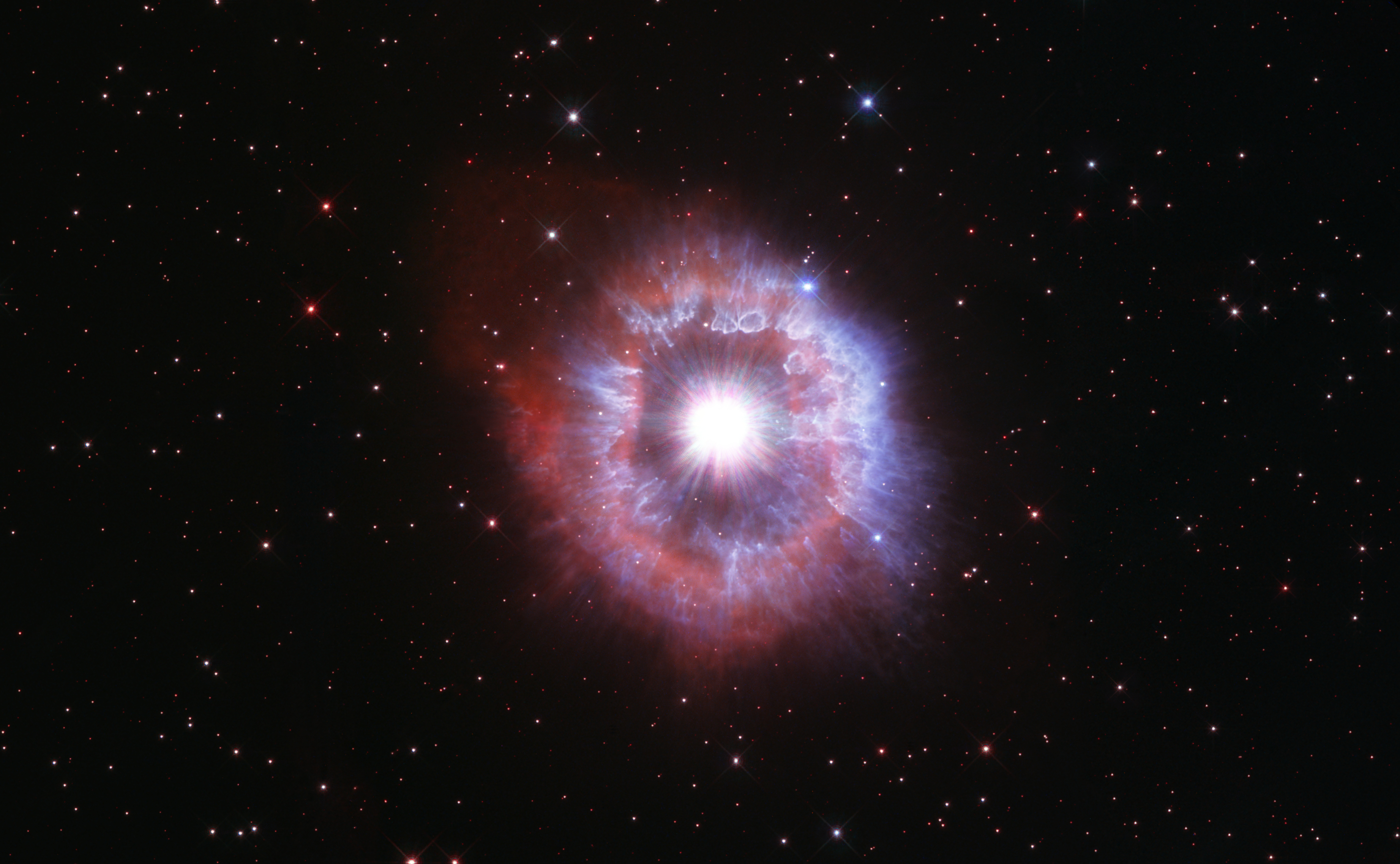
31st anniversary image - April 2021 – The Image shows AG Carinae waging a tug-of-war between gravity and radiation to avoid self-destruction.

== 32nd (2022) ==
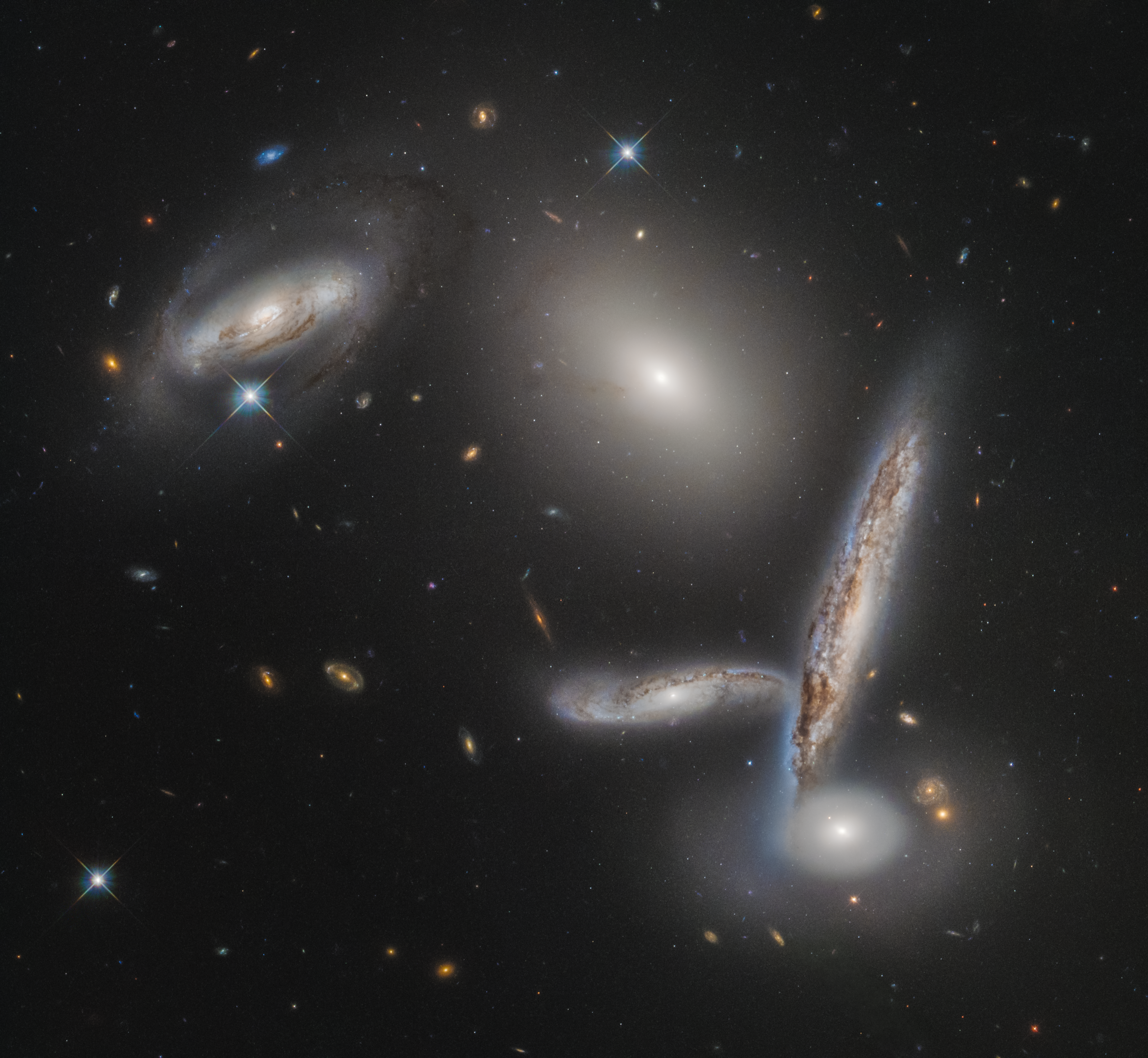
32nd anniversary image - April 2022 – The Image shows an unusual close-knit collection of five galaxies, called the Hickson Compact Group 40. Three spiral-shaped galaxies, an elliptical galaxy, and a lenticular (lens-like) galaxy, these different galaxies crossed paths in their evolution to create an exceptionally crowded and eclectic galaxy sampler.

== 33rd (2023) ==
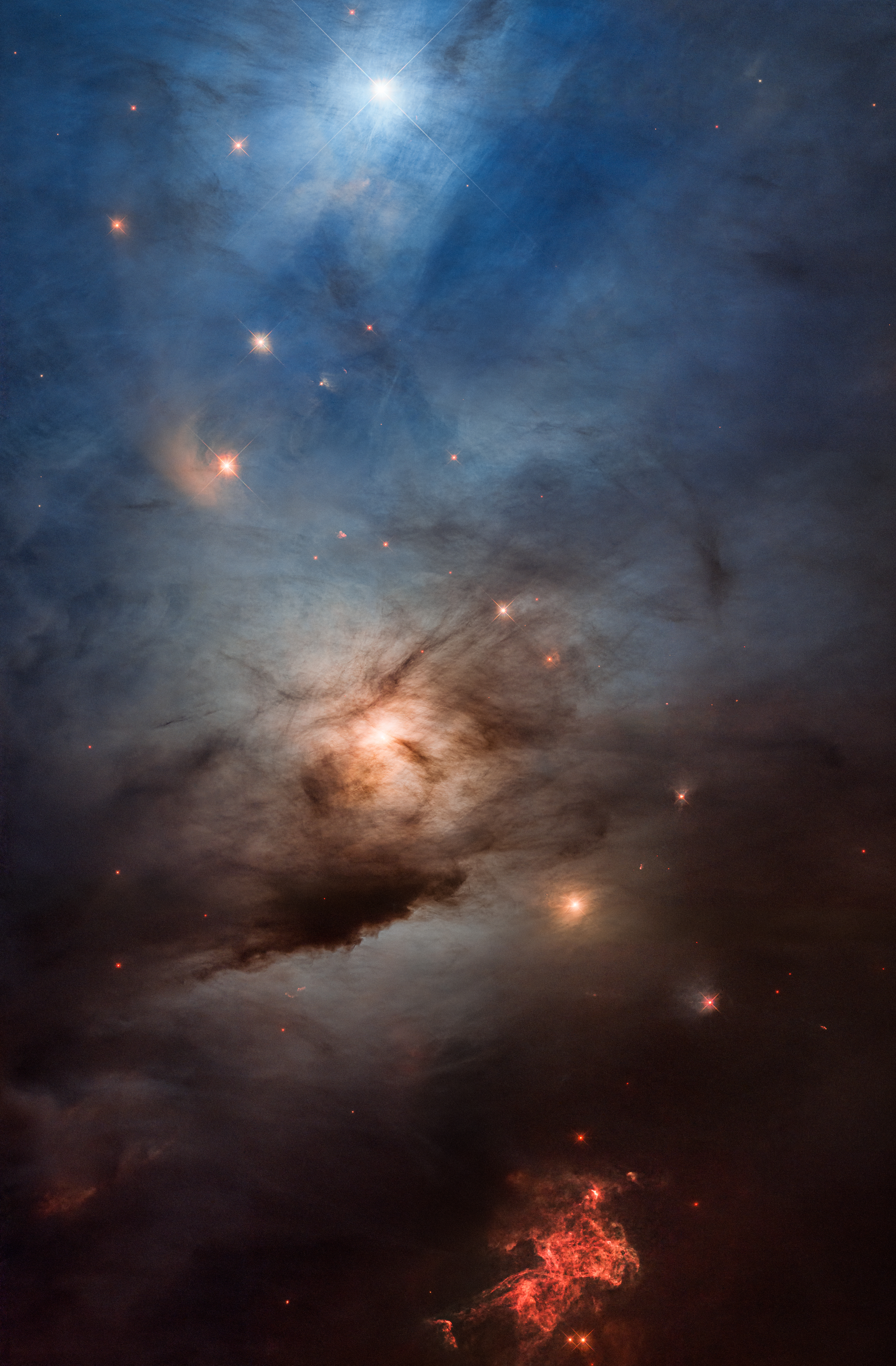
33rd anniversary image - April 2023 - This image shows the nearby star-forming region, NGC 1333.

== 34th (2024) ==
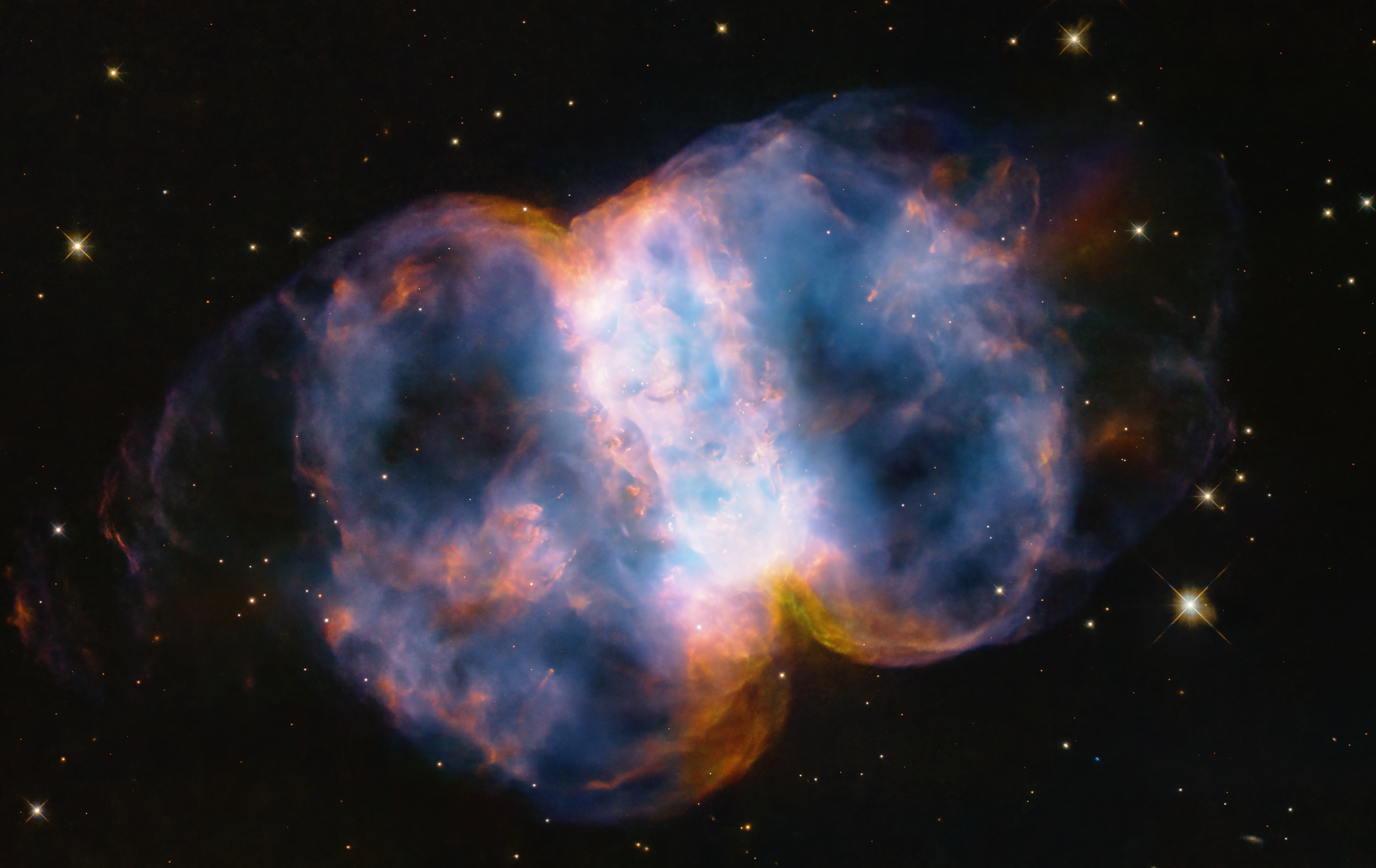
34th anniversary image - April 2024 - This image shows the Little Dumbbell Nebula (M76).

== See also ==
- List of Deep Fields
