= UGC 2369 =

Pair of galaxies and interacting galaxies in the constellation Aries

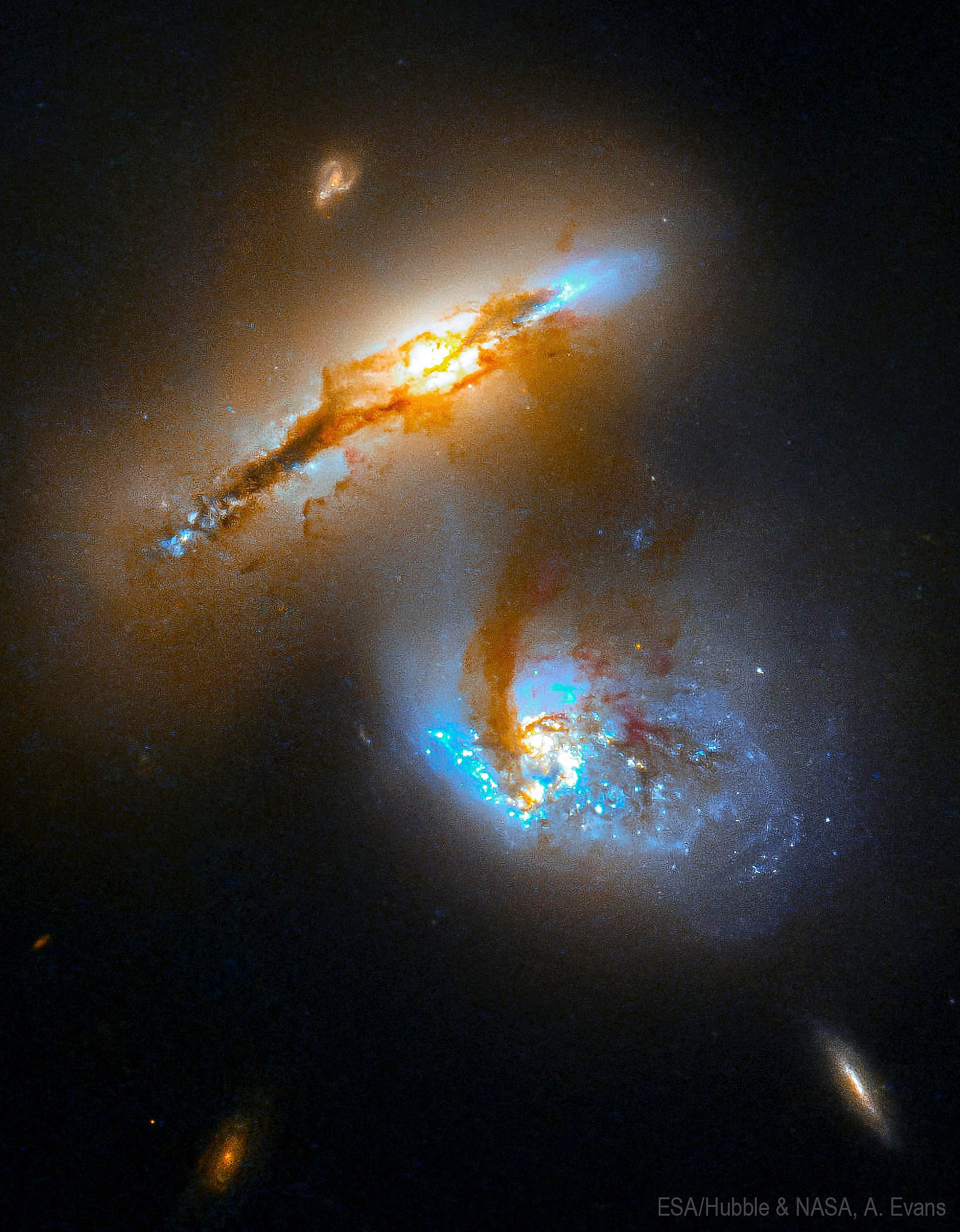
- Hubble Space Telescope image of UGC 2369

Observation data (J2000 epoch)
- Constellation: Aries
- Right ascension: 02^{h} 54^{m} 00.9^{s}
- Declination: +14° 58′ 31″
- Redshift: 0.031632
- Heliocentric radial velocity: 9333
- Distance: 424 Mly
- Apparent magnitude (B): 19.6

Other designations
- Galactic Creatures, Galactic duo

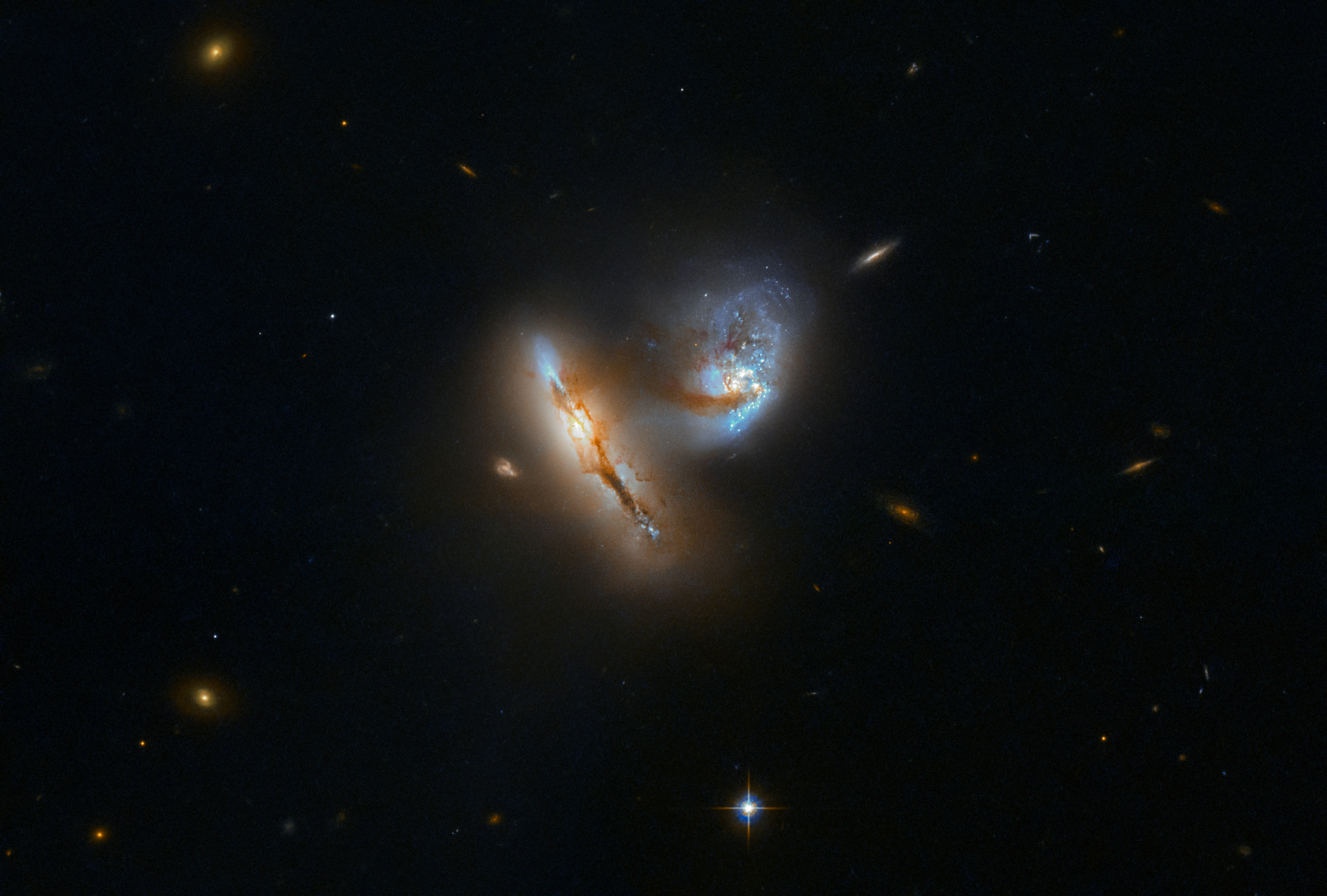
UGC 2369 taken by Hubble Space Telescope

UGC 2369 is a pair of galaxies and interacting galaxies in the constellation Aries, about 424 million light-years away. The two galaxies are called UGC 2369N and UGC 2369S.

A tenuous bridge of gas, dust and stars can be seen connecting the two galaxies, created when they pulled material out into space across the diminishing divide between them. Interaction between galaxies is not an uncommon event, however, two similarly sized ones merging is rare. The images released by NASA show both the galaxies distorting as they pulled closer. In the images, a thin bridge of gas, dust and stars can also be seen. The ridge was developed when the gap between both of the galaxies started diminishing.

== See also ==
- Mice Galaxies – two interacting galaxies
- NGC 4302 – an edge-on spiral galaxy
- Antennae Galaxies – two interacting galaxies
