= Arp 251 =

Galaxy cluster in the constellation Cetus

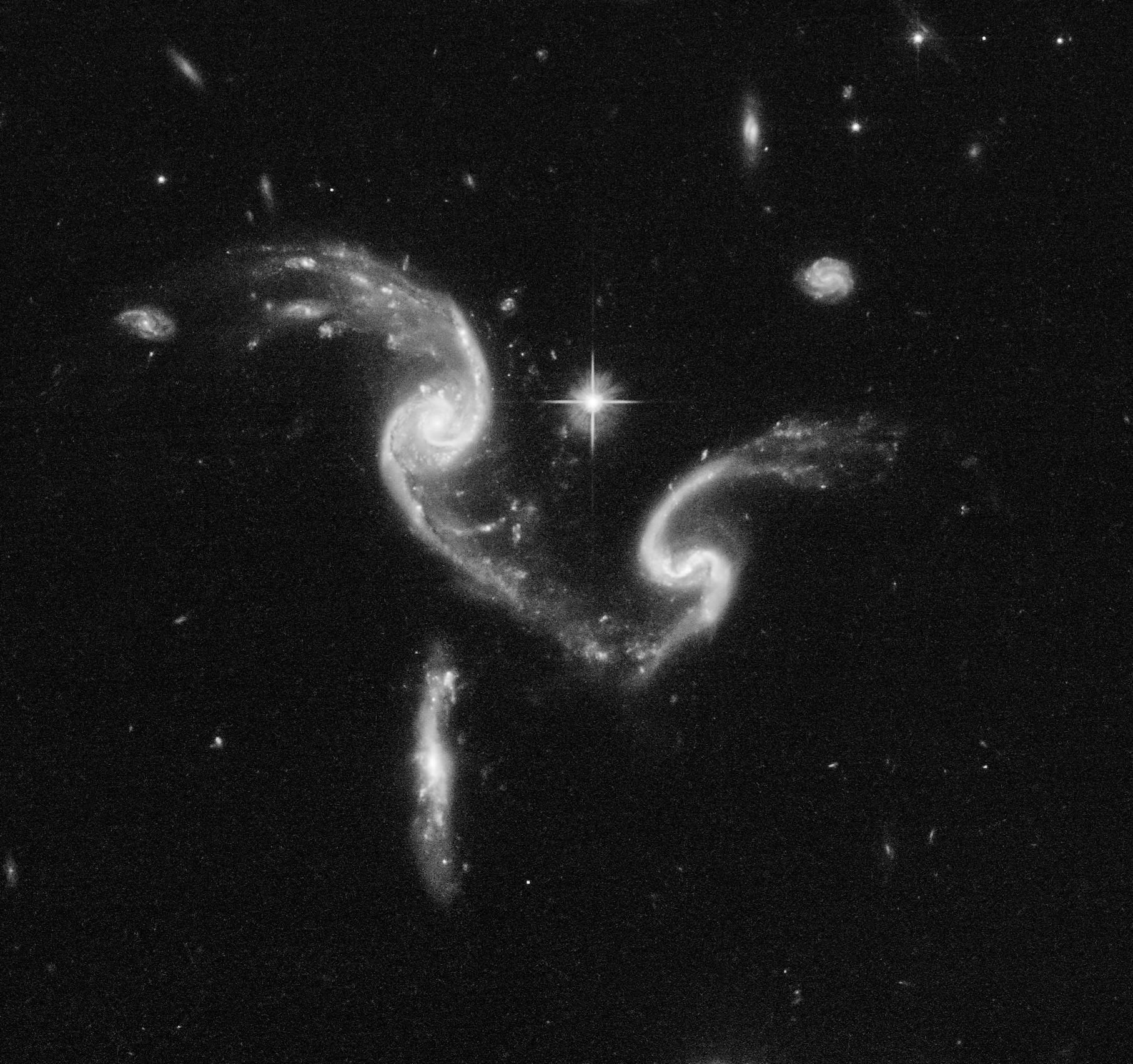

Observation data (Epoch J2000)
- Constellation: Cetus
- Right ascension: 00h53m
- Declination: -13°51'
- Number of galaxies: 3

Arp 251 is a group of three spiral galaxies. The galaxies (2MASX J00534840-1351148, 2MASX J00534765-1351358 and 2MASX J00533671-1349541) are visible in the constellation Cetus. Arp 251 is cataloged in the Atlas of Peculiar Galaxies, which is a catalog of unusual galaxies put into groups based on purely morphological criteria. Arp 251 belongs to the class of galaxies with signs of splitting.

== Galaxies ==
=== 2MASX J00534840-1351148 ===
2MASX J00534 is the northernmost galaxy in Arp 251. It spans 30 arc-seconds in apparent view, which corresponds to a diameter of 170,000 light years. The upper arm is disturbed, meaning that galaxy interaction may be present.

=== 2MASX J00534765-1351358 ===
2MASX J005347 is the southernmost galaxy out of the triplet and has a magnitude of 15.1. It's visual magnitude is unknown.

=== 2MASX J00533671-1349541 ===
2MASX J005446 has a magnitude of 16.4 and a redshift distance of 700 million+ light-years. It has a larger angular size than the other galaxies making up Arp 251.

== See also ==
- Halton Arp
- Hickson 40
- Lists of galaxies
