= NGC 4607 =

Galaxy in the constellation Virgo

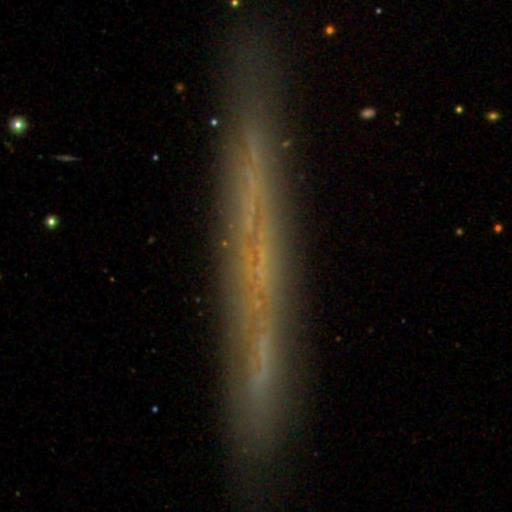
- Sloan Digital Sky Survey image of NGC 4607.

Observation data (J2000 epoch)
- Constellation: Virgo
- Right ascension: 12^{h} 41^{m} 12.4^{s}
- Declination: 11° 53′ 12″
- Redshift: 0.007572
- Heliocentric radial velocity: 2270 km/s
- Distance: 56.39 Mly (17.290 Mpc)
- Group or cluster: Virgo Cluster
- Apparent magnitude (V): 13.75

Characteristics
- Type: Sb
- Size: ~52,500 ly (16.09 kpc) (estimated)
- Apparent size (V): 2.9 x 0.7

Other designations
- CGCG 70-216, Ho 436b, IRAS 12386+1209, MCG 2-32-176, PGC 42544, UGC 7843, VCC 1868

NGC 4607 is an edge-on spiral galaxy located about 56 million light-years away in the constellation Virgo. NGC 4607 was discovered by astronomer R. J. Mitchell on April 24, 1854. The galaxy is a member of the Virgo Cluster.

== Interaction with NGC 4606 ==
NGC 4607 may be a possible companion of NGC 4606 and they are separated from each other by a projected distance of about ~55,000–65,000 ly (17–20 kpc). Despite this, NGC 4607 does not show any evidence in the optical or H I of having been tidally disturbed unlike NGC 4606. This would be inconsistent if a strong tidal interaction has occurred between the two galaxies. Also, both galaxies' redshifts differ by about 600 km/s making it unlikely that they are a gravitationally bound pair.

== See also ==
- List of NGC objects (4001–5000)
- NGC 4302 - Another galaxy in the Virgo Cluster with a similar appearance
