= Southern Crab Nebula =

Planetary nebula in the constellation Centaurus

Emission nebula
- Planetary nebula
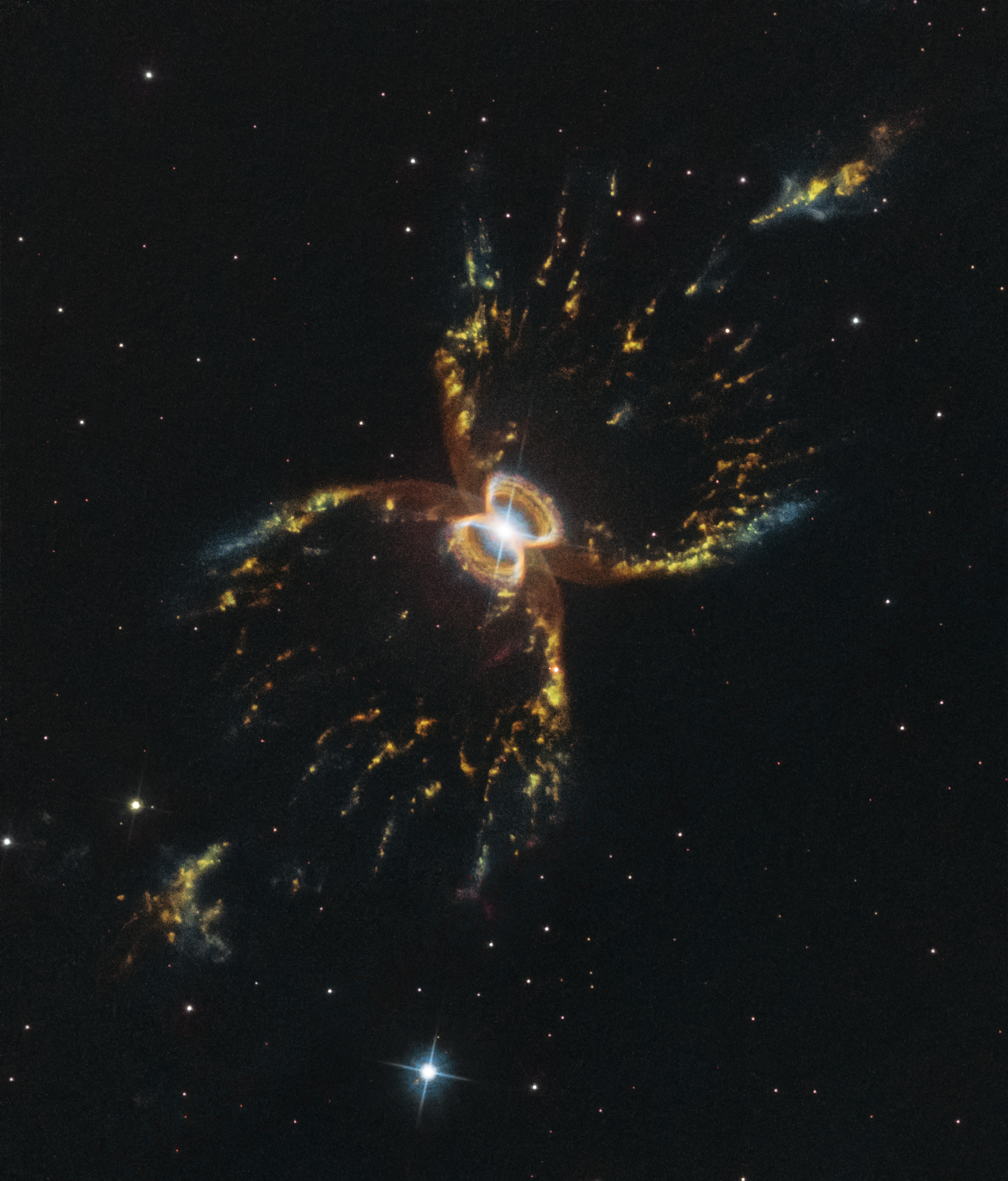
- The Southern Crab Nebula image taken by Hubble

Observation data: J2000 epoch
- Right ascension: 14^{h} 11^{m} 52.06^{s}
- Declination: −51° 26′ 24.1″
- Distance: 7,000 ly (2,100 pc) ly
- Apparent magnitude (V): 14.20
- Constellation: Centaurus
- Notable features: Has a symbiotic star system at its center
- Designations: V852 Cen, Hen 2-104, IRAS 14085-5112, PN G315.4+09.4, Wray 16-147, 2MASS J14115206-5126241

The Southern Crab Nebula (or WRAY 16-147 or Hen 2-104) is a nebula in the constellation Centaurus. The nebula is several thousand light years from Earth, and its central star is a symbiotic Mira variable − white dwarf pair.

== Nomenclature ==
It is named for its resemblance to the Crab Nebula, which is in the northern sky. The name Southern Crab was officially added to the IAU Catalog of Star Names on 13 June 2026.

The designation He2-104 (or Hen 2-104) comes from Karl Gordon Henize's 1967 catalog, Observations of Southern Planetary Nebulae. The catalog includes 459 items identified as planetary nebulae (or likely as such). (Note: Planetary nebulae are unrelated to planets.)

== History of observations ==
The Southern Crab was noted in a 1967 catalog, and was also observed using a CCD imager with the 2.2 meter telescope at the La Sila observatory in 1989. The 1989 observation marked a major expansion of knowledge about the nebula, and it was observed using various filters.

The nebula had already been observed using Earth-based telescopes, but images taken with the Hubble Space Telescope in 1999 have provided much more detail, revealing that at the center of the nebula are a pair of stars, a red giant and a white dwarf. It was imaged again by HST in 2019 with a newer instrument.

In 1999, it was imaged by the Hubble Space Telescope's Wide Field and Planetary Camera 2, noted for its unique "stair-step" crop and for such astrophotos as the Pillars of Creation.

The WFPC2 images were taken at an optical light wavelength of 658 nm.

The nebula was imaged again by the Hubble Space Telescope in 2019, and a set of images to celebrate the anniversary of the space telescope's launch in 1990 (29 years) by the Space Shuttle. This time a newer camera the WFC3 was used to image the nebula, at wavelengths filters of about 502, 656, 658, and 673 nanometers.

In 2008, an investigation of the Southern Crab with its symbiotic star was published. The study used imaging and spectroscopic data from space and Earth-surface telescopes including Hubble and VLT observatories. The ESO defines a symbiotic star system as "binaries in which a small hot star (white dwarf or main sequence star) orbits around a red giant star. These systems are often surrounded by an envelope of gas or dust; those with gas are known as S-types and those with dust as D-types."

== Gallery ==
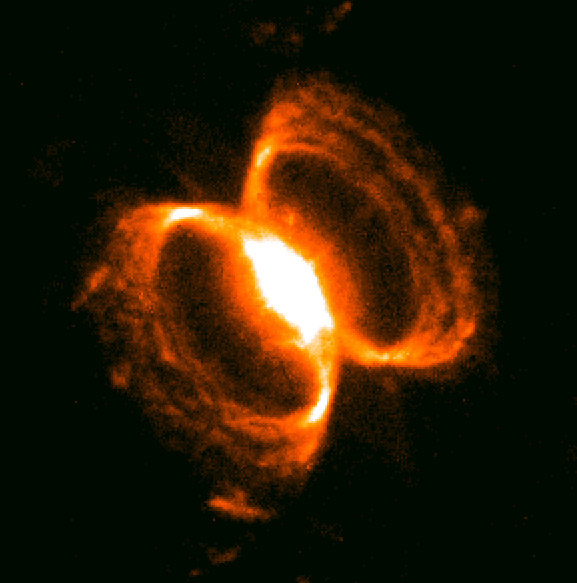
Close up of the center of the Nebula

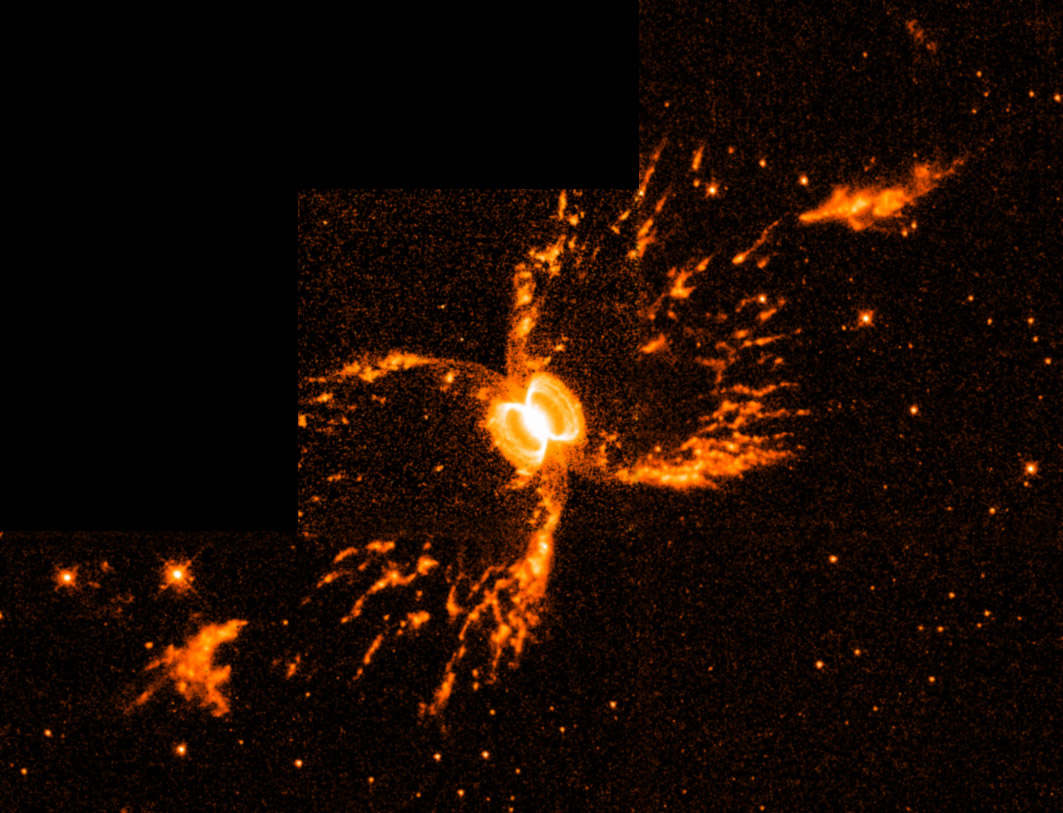
The Southern Crab Nebula in its entirety

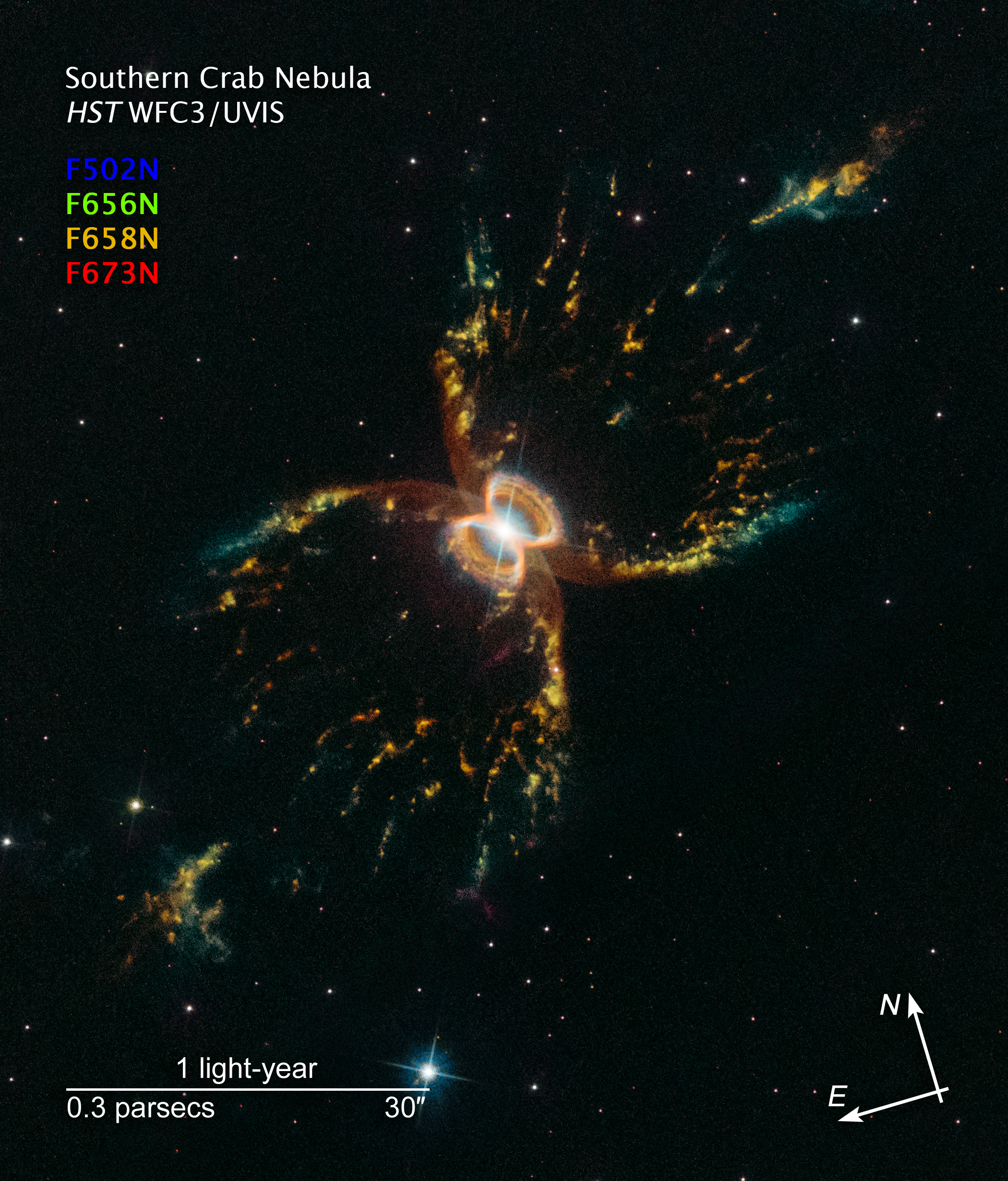
Southern Crab Nebula – (18 April 2019; annotated)

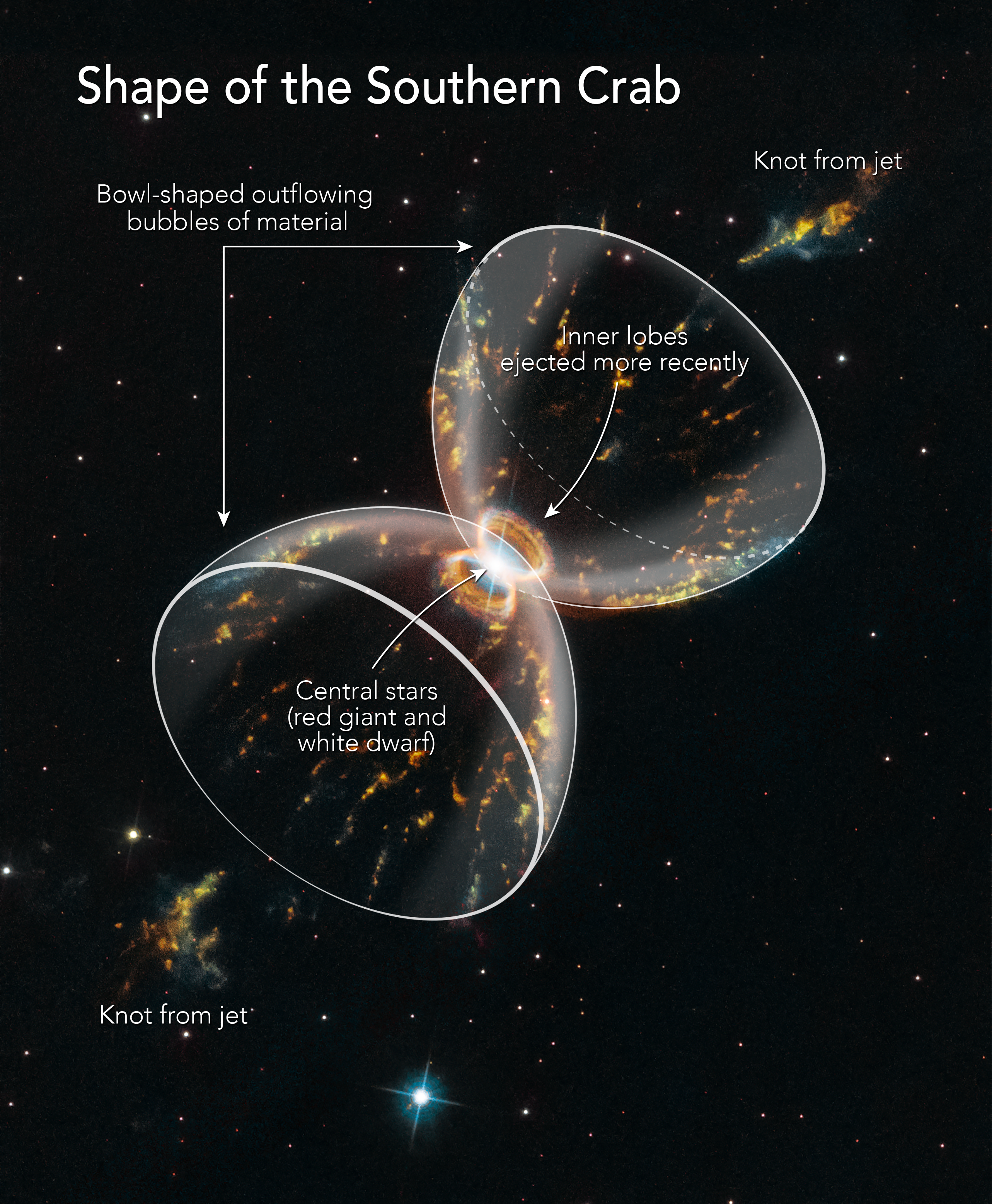
Southern Crab Nebula – (18 April 2019; shape)

== See also ==
- List of Hubble anniversary images
