= NGC 4606 =

Spiral galaxy in the constellation Virgo

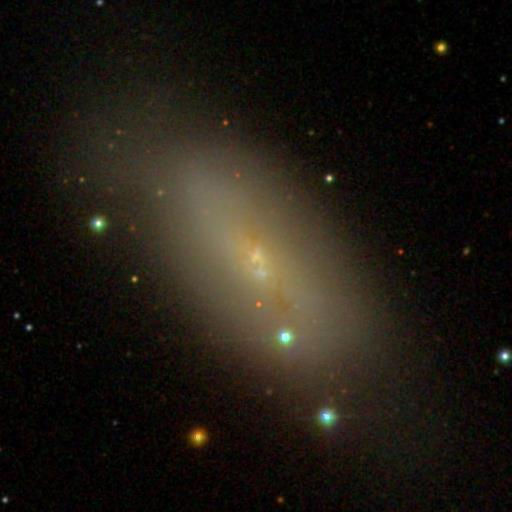
- SDSS image of NGC 4606.

Observation data (J2000 epoch)
- Constellation: Virgo
- Right ascension: 12^{h} 40^{m} 57.5^{s}
- Declination: 11° 54′ 44″
- Redshift: 0.005470
- Heliocentric radial velocity: 1640 km/s
- Distance: 53.3 Mly (16.35 Mpc)
- Group or cluster: Virgo Cluster
- Apparent magnitude (V): 12.67

Characteristics
- Type: Sa
- Size: ~51,400 ly (15.75 kpc) (estimated)
- Apparent size (V): 3.2 x 1.6

Other designations
- CGCG 70-213, IRAS 12384+1211, MCG 2-32-174, PGC 42516, UGC 7839, VCC 1859

NGC 4606 is a spiral galaxy located about 55 million light-years away in the constellation of Virgo. NGC 4606 was discovered by astronomer William Herschel on March 15, 1784. It has a disturbed stellar disk suggesting the actions of gravitational interactions. NGC 4607 may be a possible companion of NGC 4606. However, their redshifts differ by about 600 km/s, making it unlikely that they are a gravitationally bound pair. NGC 4606 is a member of the Virgo Cluster.

== See also ==
- List of NGC objects (4001–5000)
