= UGC 6945 =

Trio of interacting galaxies in the constellation Ursa Major

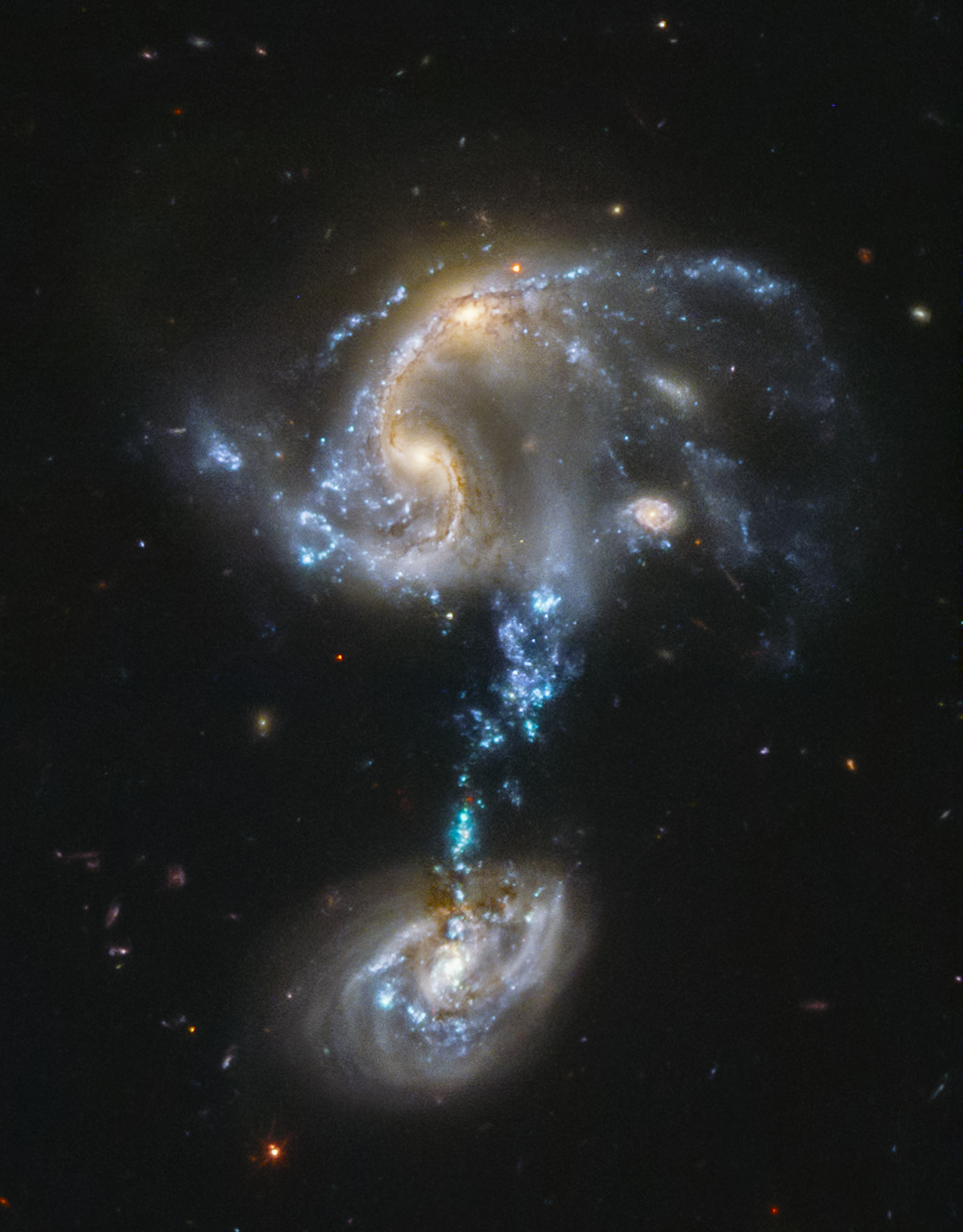
- UGC 6945 by Hubble Space Telescope

Observation data (J2000 epoch)
- Constellation: Ursa Major
- Right ascension: 11^{h} 57^{m} 54.87^{s}
- Declination: +36° 23′ 32.8″
- Redshift: 0.035388 ± 0.000130
- Heliocentric radial velocity: +10,511 km s^{−1}
- Distance: 175 Mpc (570 Mly)

Characteristics
- Type: S?
- Apparent size (V): 1.202′

Other designations
- Arp 194, VV 126

UGC 6945 (also known as Arp 194) is a trio of interacting galaxies. The highly disrupted galaxy to the northwest is actually two galaxies in the advanced stages of merger, and has an angular size of 0′.8 × 0′.6. About 40″ to the southeast is a third galaxy with an angular size of 0′.35 × 0′.35.

Based upon a radial velocity of about 10,500 km s^{−1}, the interacting pair of galaxies at the northwest are located at a distance of 175 Mpc (570 Mly) from us (assuming a Hubble constant value of 60 km s^{−1} Mpc^{−1}). If we further assume that the third galaxy lies at the same distance away from us, we find that the galaxies are separated by a projected linear distance of roughly 34 Kpc (110 Kly), though later findings from Hubble may cast this assumption into doubt (see below).

As the pair of galaxies in the north gravitationally interact with each other, tidally-stripped gas from both galaxies is draped over the southern galaxy as a series of blobs, which are fueling a burst of star formation. While it has long been believed to be interacting with the northern galaxy, images from the Hubble Space Telescope clearly show that this stream of material is actually superimposed on the southern galaxy. This suggests that this third galaxy may actually lie in the background. Due to this uncertainty, the third galaxy may not be involved in the interaction.

== See also ==
- List of Hubble anniversary images
