= NGC 4298 =

Galaxy in the constellation Coma Berenices

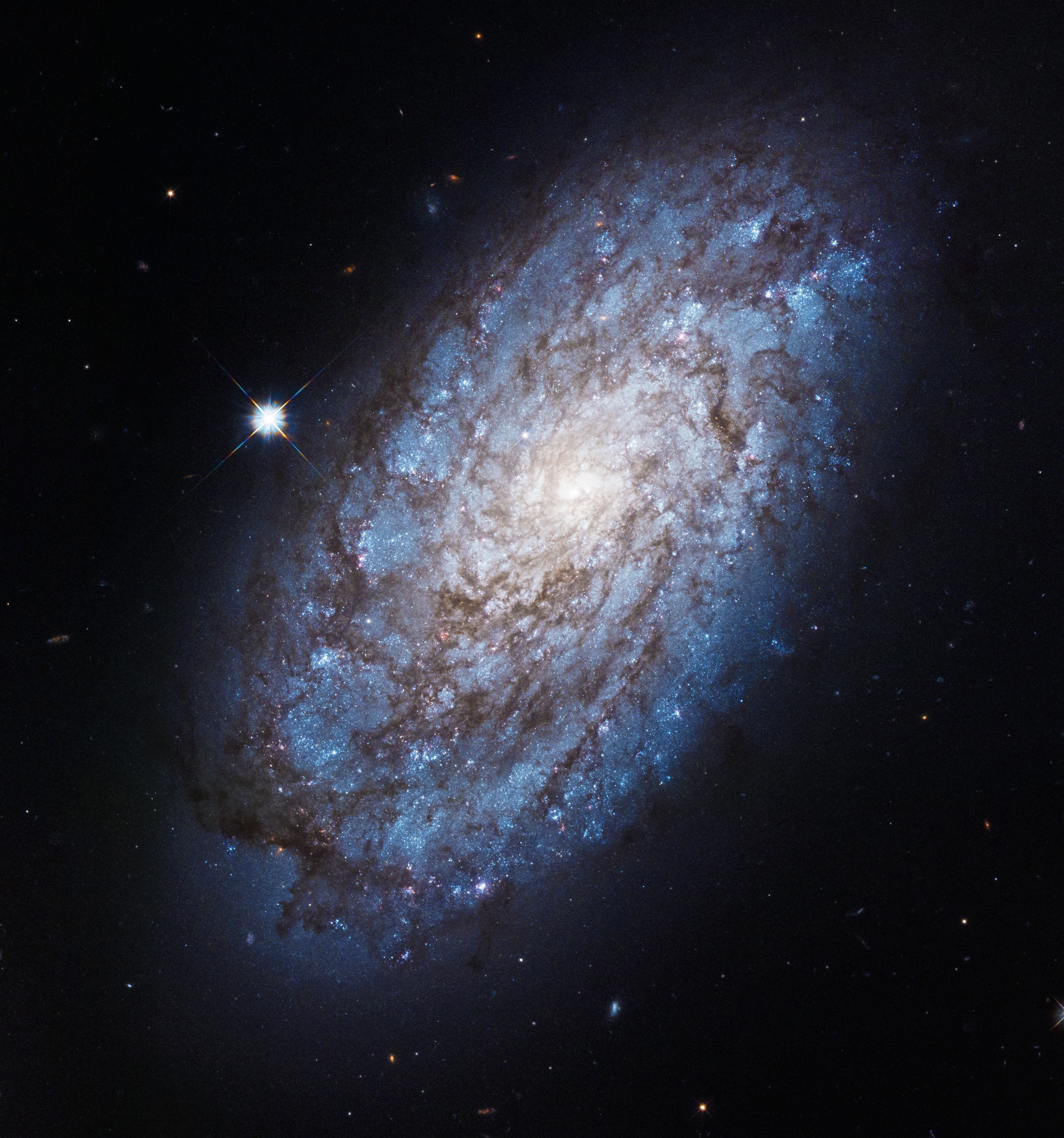
- Hubble Space Telescope image of NGC 4298

Observation data (J2000 epoch)
- Constellation: Coma Berenices
- Right ascension: 12^{h} 21^{m} 32.7^{s}
- Declination: 14° 36′ 22″
- Redshift: 0.003786
- Heliocentric radial velocity: 1135 km/s
- Distance: 53 Mly (16.4 Mpc)
- Group or cluster: Virgo Cluster
- Apparent magnitude (V): 12.5

Characteristics
- Type: SA(rs)c
- Mass: 1.5×10^{10} M_{☉}
- Size: ~55,000 ly (17 kpc) (estimated)
- Apparent size (V): 3.30 x 1.24

Other designations
- CGCG 99-24, IRAS 12190+1452, KCPG 332A, MCG 3-32-7, PGC 39950, UGC 7412, VCC 483

NGC 4298 is a flocculent spiral galaxy located about 53 million light-years away in the constellation Coma Berenices. The galaxy was discovered by astronomer William Herschel on April 8, 1784 and is a member of the Virgo Cluster.

NGC 4298 may harbor an intermediate-mass black hole with an estimated mass ranging from 20,000 (2×10^{4} M☉) to 500,000 (5×10^{5} M☉) solar masses.

== Interaction with NGC 4302 ==
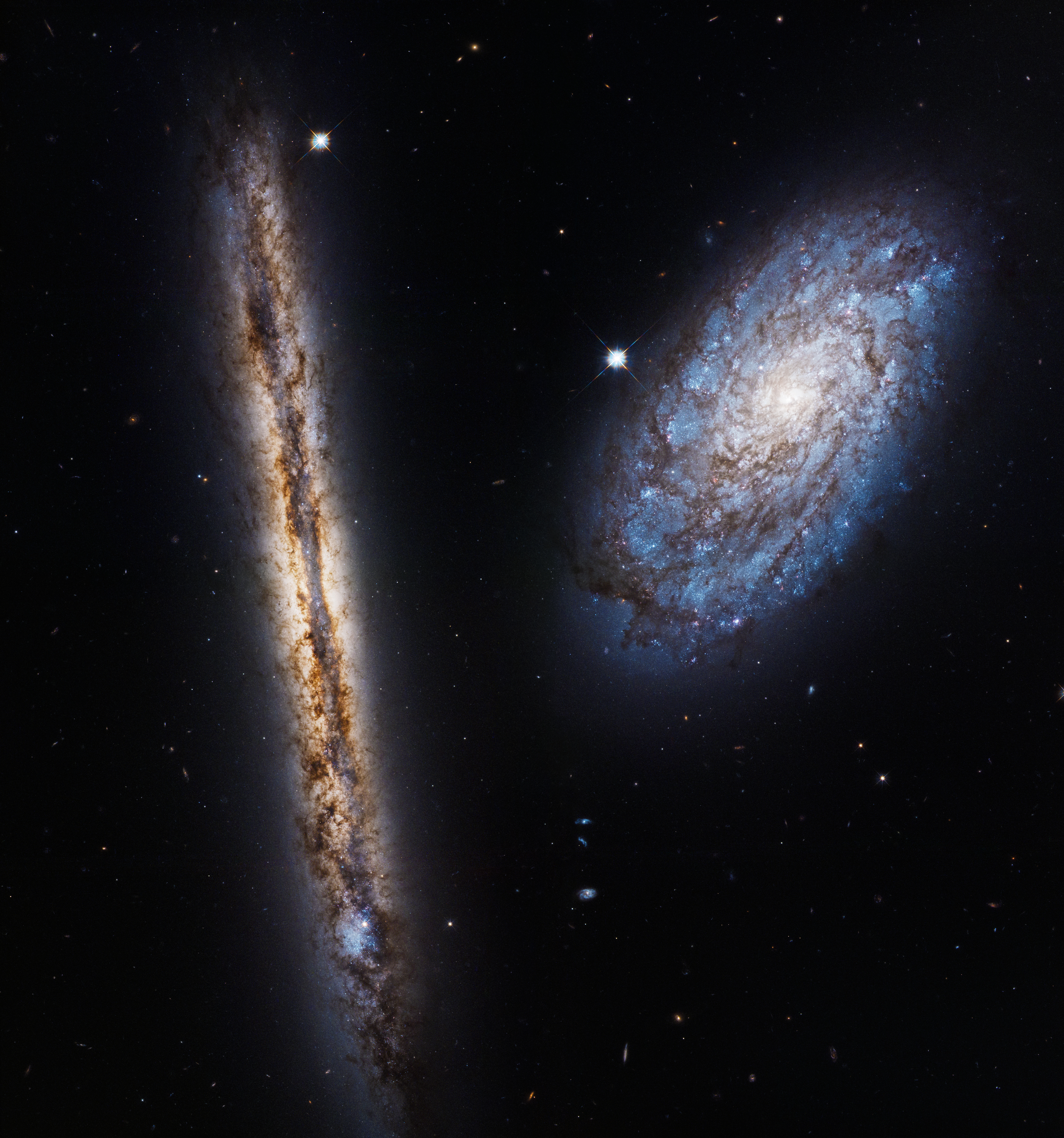
NGC 4298 (right) with nearby galaxy NGC 4302 (left).

NGC 4298 appears to form a pair with and appears to interact with NGC 4302. Evidence for an interaction between the two galaxies are that NGC 4298 exhibits a lopsided, asymmetrical distribution of stars, a tidal bridge that connects it to NGC 4302, a prodigious rate of star formation and an HI-tail. However, the tail is also the result of ram pressure.

The two galaxies are separated from a projected distance of ~36,000 ly (11 kpc).

== Ram-pressure stripping ==
The presence of a truncated gas disc, an asymmetric 6 cm polarized radio continuum distribution, an HI-tail, and asymmetries of gas in a similar direction as the ram pressure stripped gas in NGC 4302 suggest that NGC 4298 is undergoing ram pressure.

== See also ==
- List of NGC objects (4001–5000)
