= Hickson 40 =

Galaxy cluster in the constellation Hydra

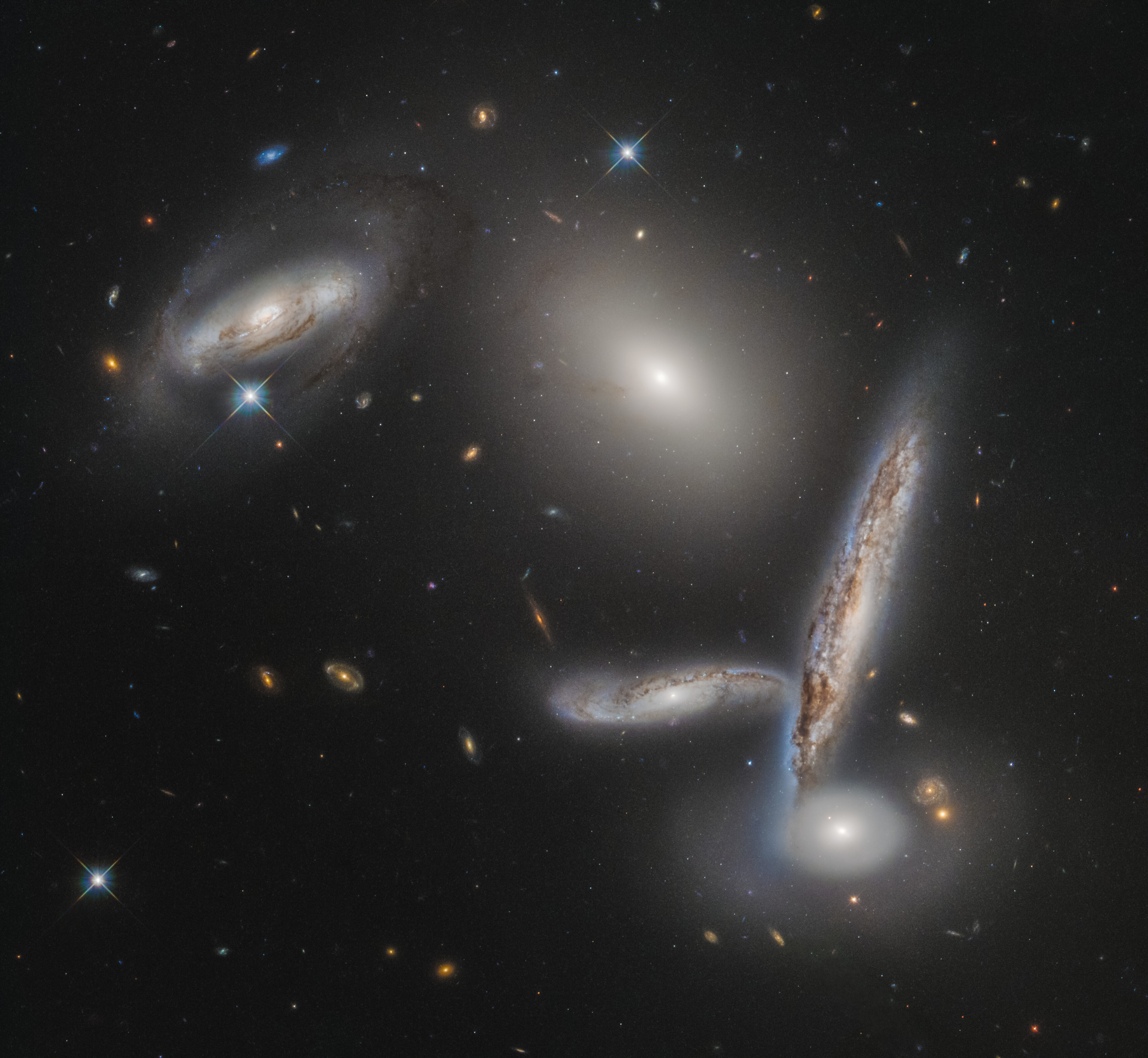
- Hickson 40 imaged by the Hubble Space Telescope

Observation data (Epoch J2000)
- Right ascension: 09h 38m 54s
- Declination: −04° 51.1′
- Number of galaxies: 6

Other designations
- MCG-01-25-008, MCG-01-25-009, MCG-01-25-010, MCG-01-25-011, MCG-01-25-012, LEDA 27517

Hickson 40 is a well-known galaxy group in the constellation Hydra. It consists of 5 separate members (three spiral galaxies, an elliptical galaxy, and a lenticular galaxy) and is in the stage of merging. Member galaxies of Hickson 40 interacted in the early stages of their formation to create a crowded galaxy sampler. Hickson 40 resides at a distance of 300 million light years and is so dense that it could even exist within a region close to the diameter of the Milky Way's galactic disk.

== Location ==
Although Hickson 40 is remarkably self-sustained, the vast majority of galaxy clusters that resemble it are typically a part of larger galaxy cluster. It can be located in the Hydra constellation.

== Formation ==
Researchers have observed Hickson 40 in many wavelengths, including visible light, radio, infrared, and X-ray. Majority of the galaxies within the cluster have a dense radio source in the cores, which could be proof for the existence of supermassive black holes. X-ray surveys have revealed that the galaxies are pushing closer together because of the amount of hot gas present. Infrared observations reveal fast rates of star formation. Hickson 40 is one of the most compact galaxy clusters ever observed, making it a valuable research point NASA. Research shows that galaxy cluster were more prevalent in the early universe, and helped the formation of quasars, whose luminosity from heated infalling material spread across the universe. Studying the formation of galaxies in other close groups like Hickson 40 have given astronomers a chance to sort out when and where galaxies assemble themselves, and what material they are made of.

== Supernovae ==
Two supernovae have been observed in HCG 40.

- SN 2003D (Type Ia, mag. 17.5) was discovered by Tim Puckett and Alex Langoussis on 6 January 2003. It was located 1".6 east and 10".2 south of the nucleus of MCG -1-25-8. (Note: The original discovery report, and most other sources, incorrectly list the host galaxy as MCG -1-25-9.)
- SN 2026dwm (Type IIb, mag. 19.97) was discovered by GOTO on 21 February 2026.

== Gallery ==
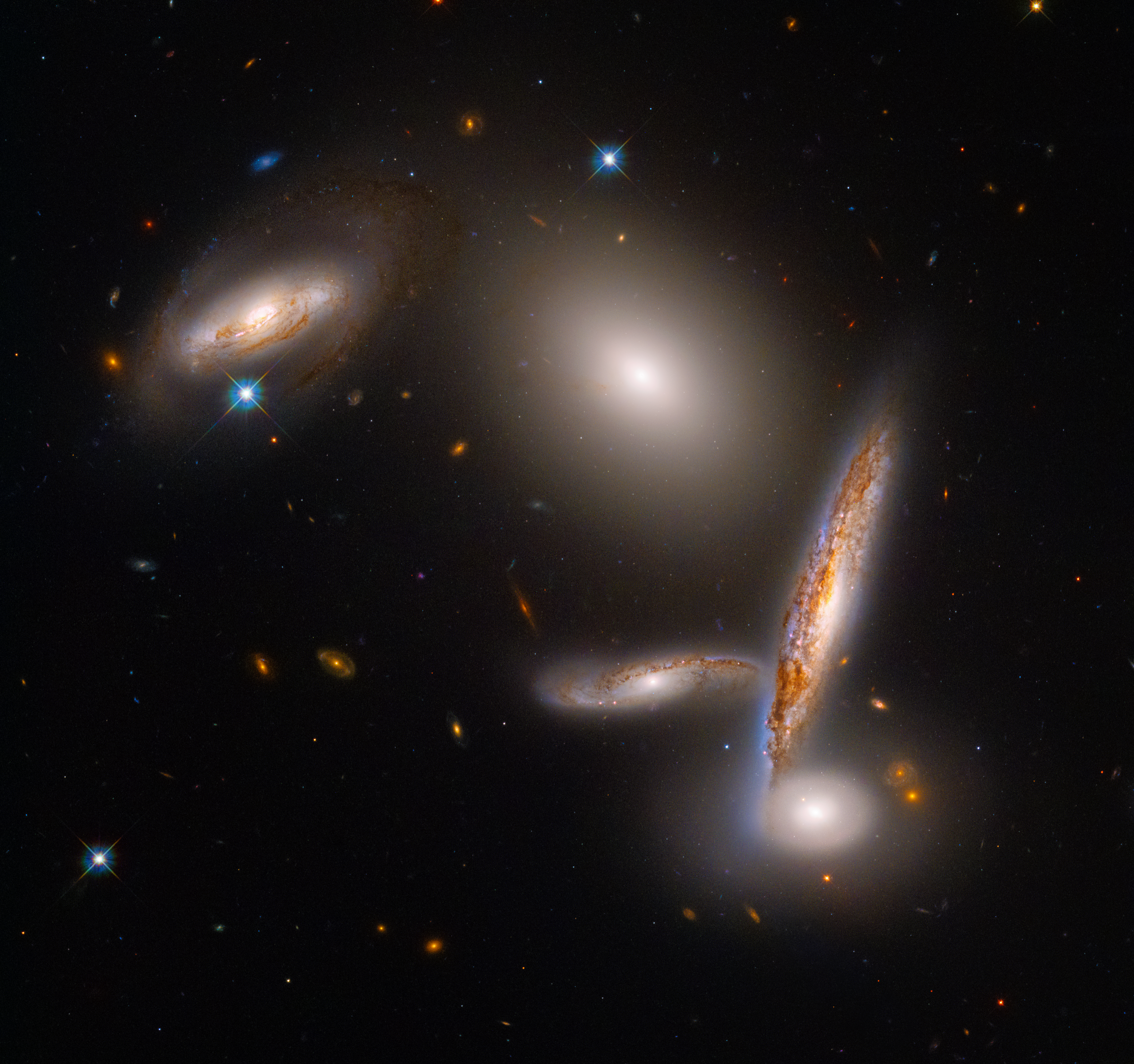
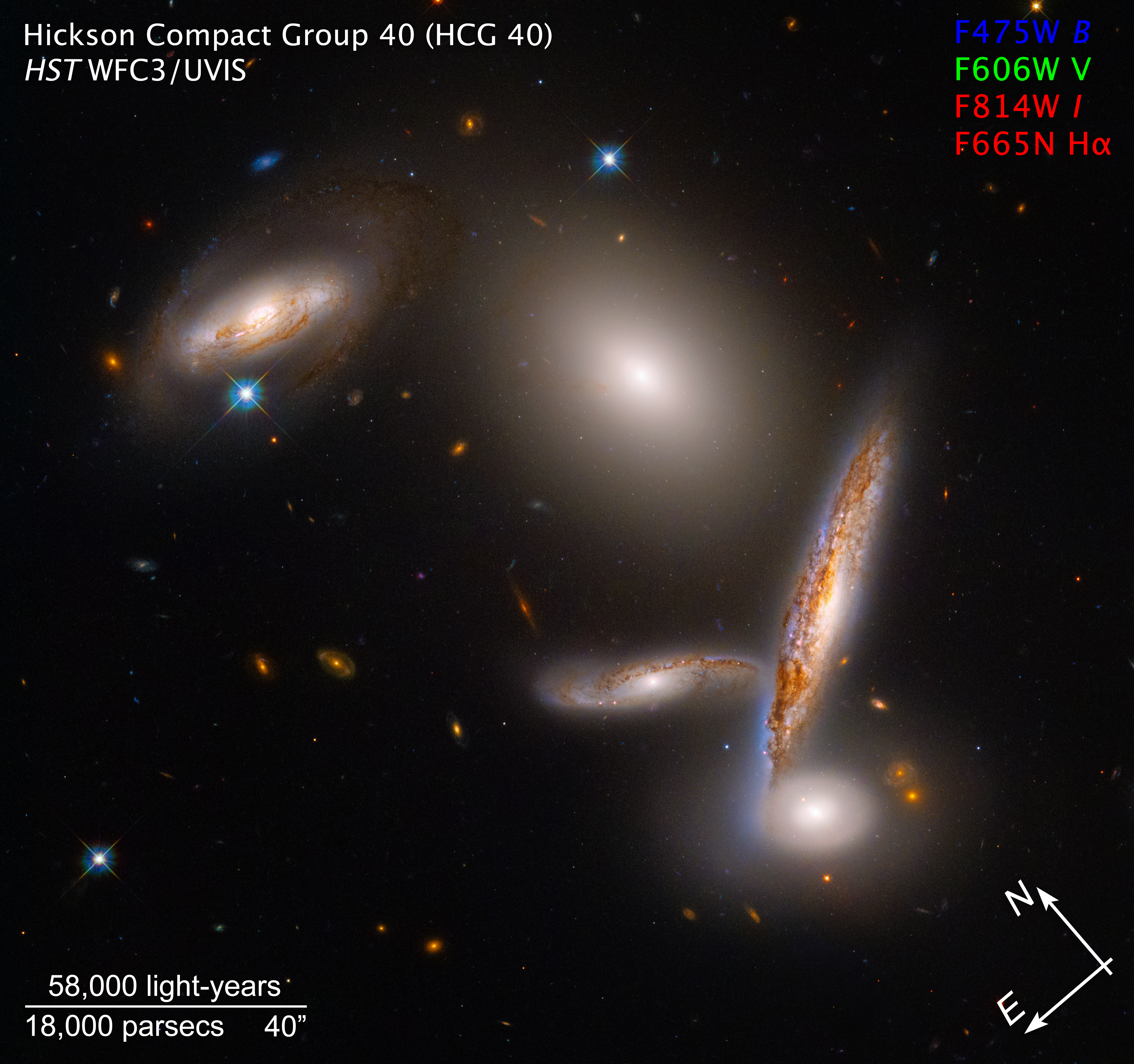

== See also ==
- Hickson Compact Group
- Supercluster
- Stephan's Quintet, a more famous HCG.

== Sources ==
- Dick, Steven J. (2019). "The Galactic Systems Family". Classifying the Cosmos. Cham: Springer International Publishing. doi:10.1007/978-3-030-10380-4_18. ISBN 978-3-030-10379-8.
