= NGC 4302 =

Galaxy in the constellation Coma Berenices

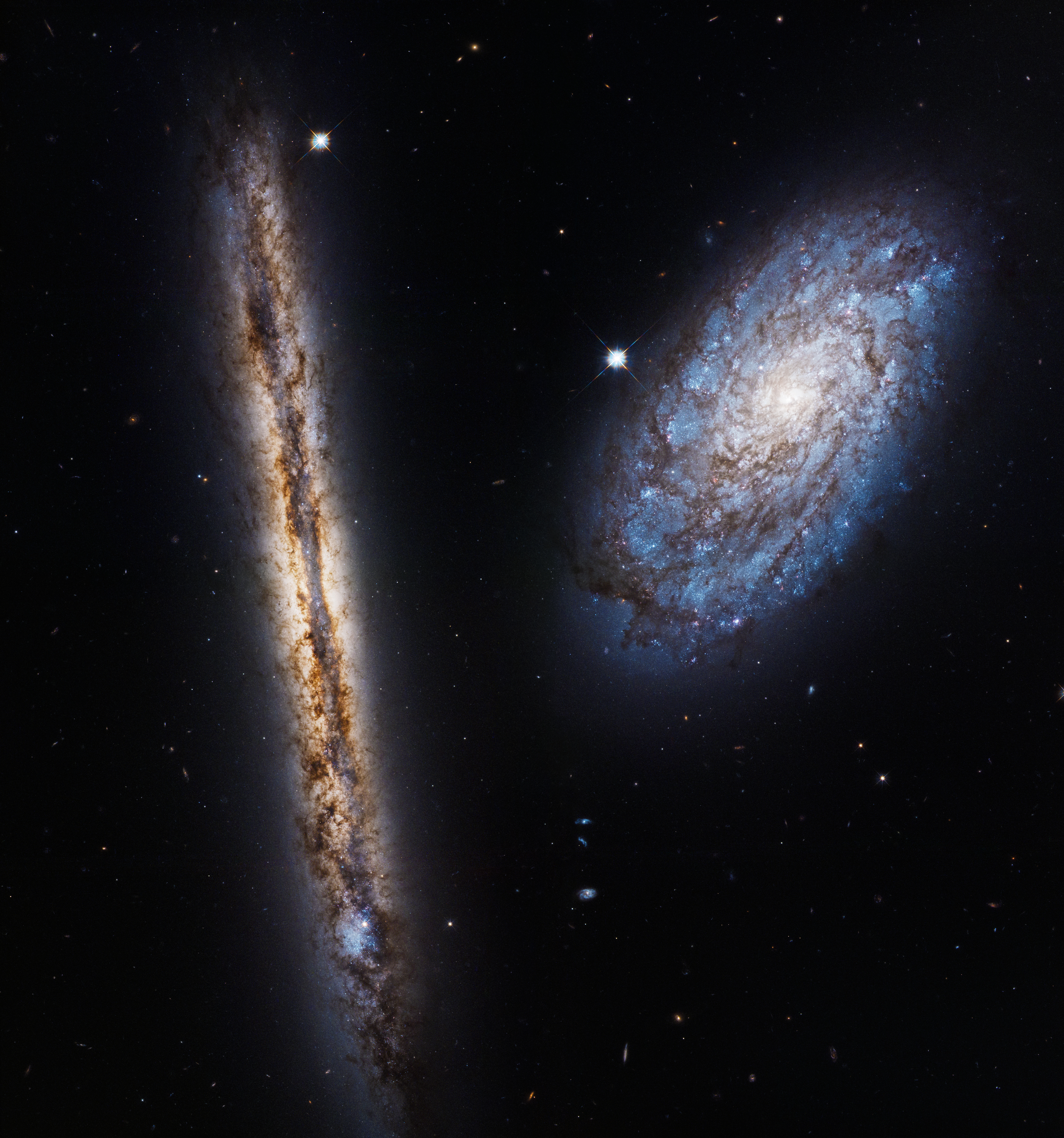
- Hubble Space Telescope image of NGC 4302. NGC 4298 can be seen to the right of the image.

Observation data (J2000 epoch)
- Constellation: Coma Berenices
- Right ascension: 12^{h} 21^{m} 42.5^{s}
- Declination: 14° 35′ 54″
- Redshift: 0.003833
- Heliocentric radial velocity: 1,149 km/s
- Distance: 55 Mly (17 Mpc)
- Group or cluster: Virgo Cluster
- Apparent magnitude (V): 13.6

Characteristics
- Type: Sc
- Mass: 1.0×10^{11} M_{☉}
- Size: ~140,000 ly (42 kpc) (estimated)
- Apparent size (V): 2.78 × 0.75

Other designations
- CGCG 99-27, KCPG 332B, MCG 3-32-9, PGC 39974, UGC 7418, VCC 497

NGC 4302 is an edge-on spiral galaxy located about 55 million light-years away in the constellation Coma Berenices. It was discovered by astronomer William Herschel on April 8, 1784 and is a member of the Virgo Cluster.

It is classified as a Seyfert galaxy and as a LINER galaxy. It also has a prominent, extended dust lane.

== Physical characteristics ==
The disk of NGC 4302 contains extraplanar dust that is organized into filamentary structures and large dust complexes. The apparent bending of many of the large complexes toward the north of the galaxy appears to be due to an interaction with the intracluster medium caused by the motion of NGC 4302 as it falls into the Virgo Cluster.

The dense, dusty matter in the disk of NGC 4302 appears to be largely tracing matter ejected from the disk by energetic feedback from massive stars.

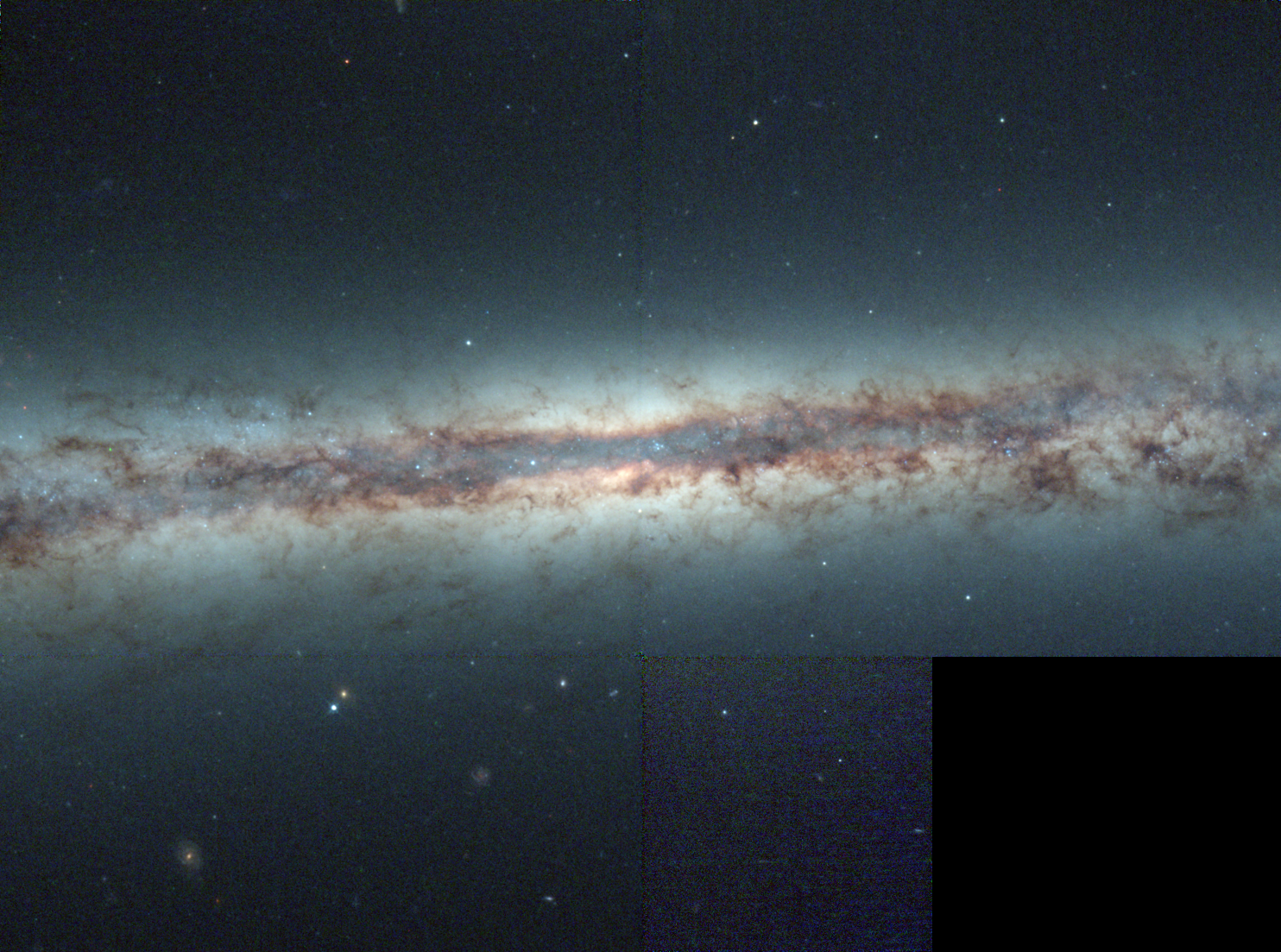
Hubble Space Telescope image of the dust lane and bulge of NGC 4302

=== Extraplanar Diffuse Ionized Gas ===
First detected by Pildis et al., NGC 4302 has a faint but prominent layer of extraplanar diffuse ionized gas (DIG) that extends out to a galactocentric radius of ~13,000 ly (4 kpc) and a height of ~6,500 ly (2 kpc) above the plane of the galaxy.

The DIG appears to have been ionized by photoionization by OB stars.

=== Box/Peanut Bulge ===
The presence of a boxy/peanut bulge in NGC 4302 suggests that the galaxy contains a thickened bar that is viewed edge-on.

=== HI Disk ===
The HI disk of NGC 4302 is truncated to within the optical disk to the south of the galaxy. This truncation appears to be the result of ram pressure.

== Tidal Bridge ==
Kantharia et al. and Zschaechner et al. both independently detected a tidal bridge between NGC 4302 and NGC 4298. The bridge is the result of a tidal interaction between the two galaxies.

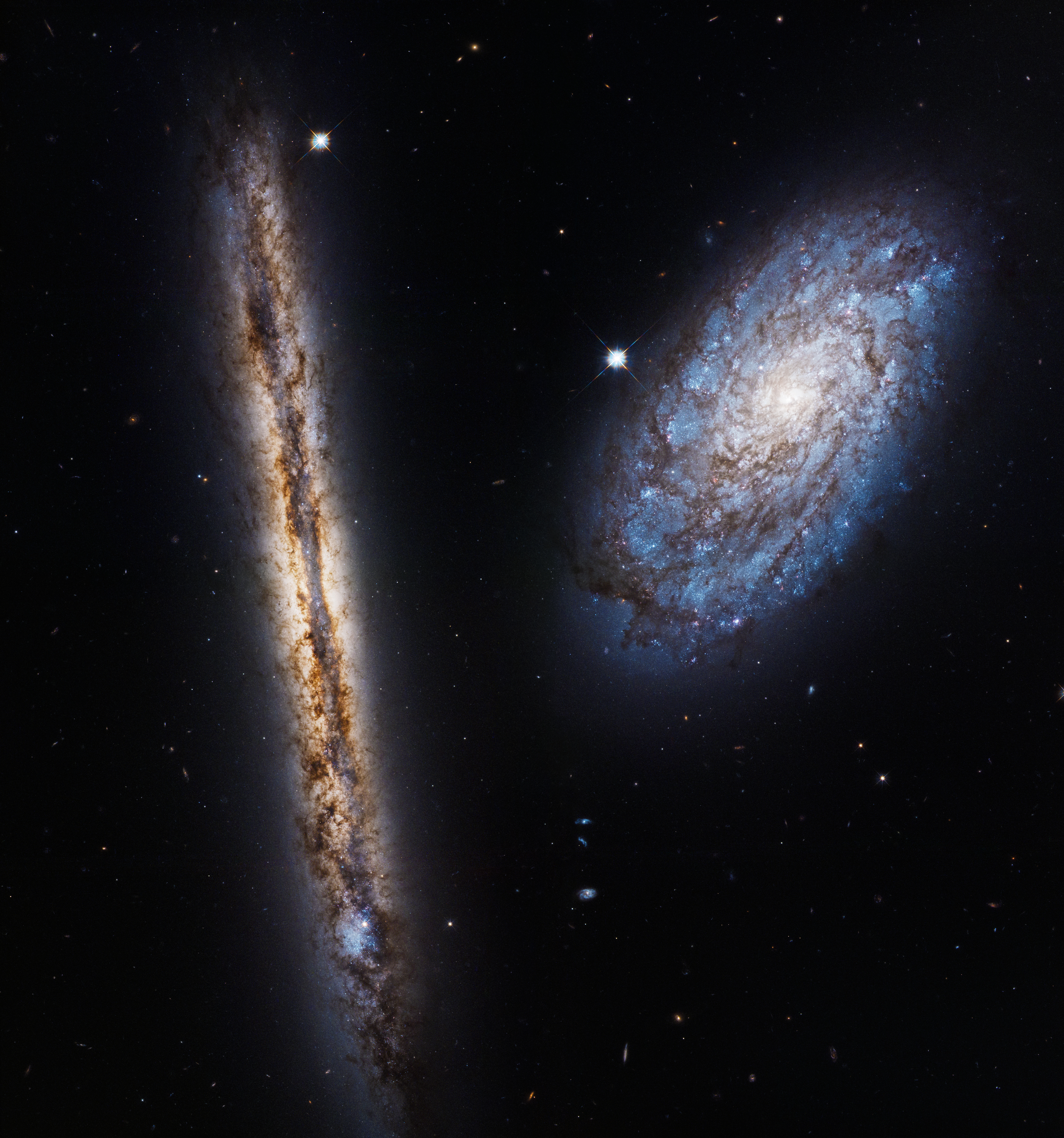
NGC 4302 & NGC 4298 (HST)

== HI tail ==
First identified by Chung et al., NGC 4302 has a ~52,000 ly (16 kpc) tail of neutral atomic hydrogen (HI) that extends to the north of the galaxy. The tail appears to be a result of ram pressure or by a tidal interaction with NGC 4298. However, NGC 4302 appears relatively undisturbed favoring the cause of the tail to be due to ram pressure.

The HI tail is pointed away from M87 which suggests that NGC 4302 is falling into the center of the Virgo Cluster on a highly radial orbit.

== SN 1986E ==
NGC 4302 has hosted one supernova, a Type IIL supernova designated as SN 1986E. The supernova was discovered by G. Candeo at the Asiago Observatory on April 13, 1986, with an apparent magnitude of 14.5.

== See also ==
- List of NGC objects (4001–5000)
