= NGC 4197 =

Galaxy in the constellation Virgo

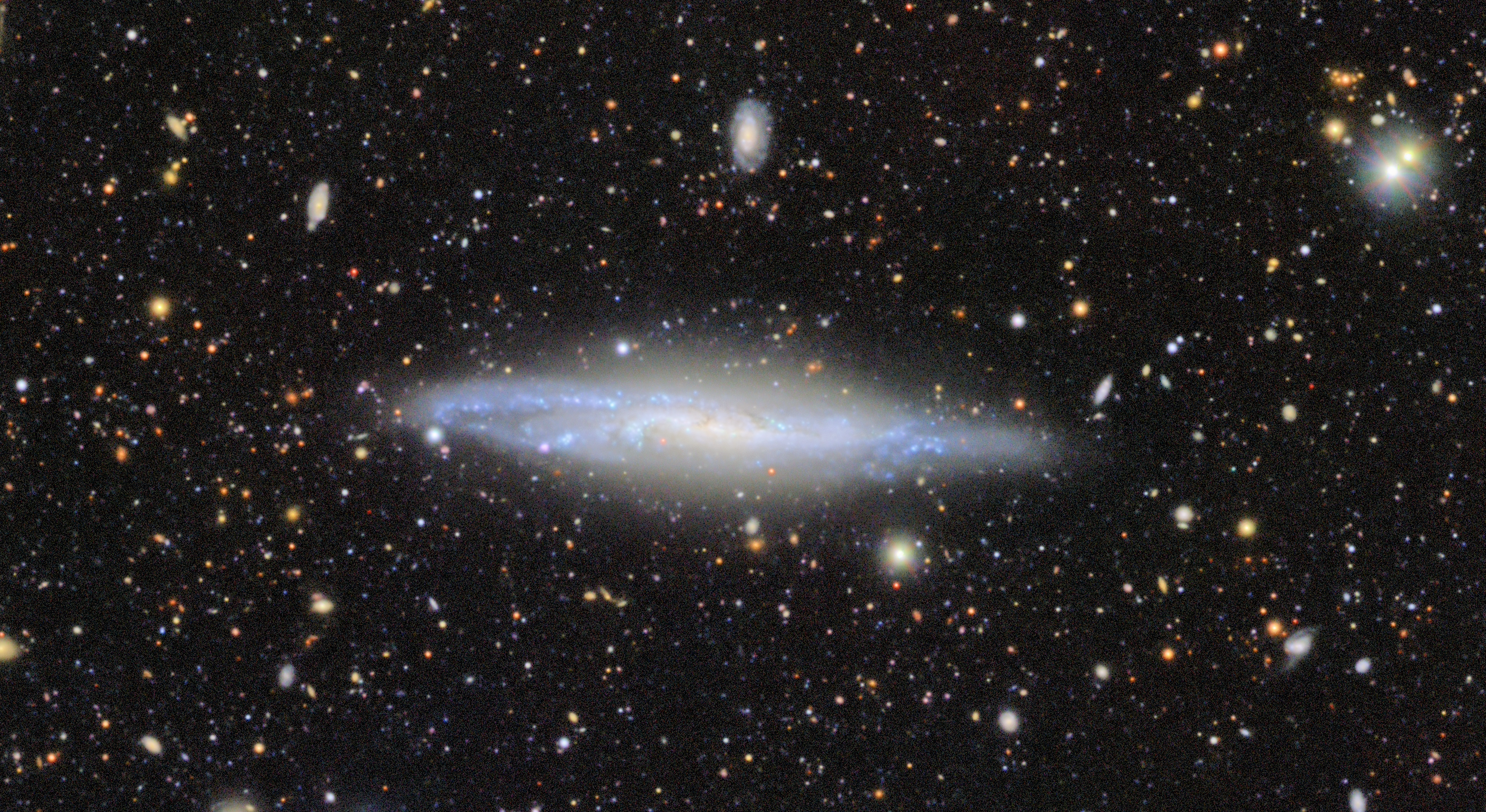
- NGC 4197 imaged by the Vera C. Rubin Observatory

Observation data (J2000 epoch)
- Constellation: Virgo
- Right ascension: 12^{h} 14^{m} 38.529^{s}
- Declination: +05° 48′ 19.95″
- Redshift: 0.006940 ± 0.000013
- Heliocentric radial velocity: 2,081 ± 4 km/s
- Distance: 89.4 ± 12.1 Mly (27.4 ± 3.7 Mpc)
- Group or cluster: NGC 4261 Group
- Apparent magnitude (V): 12.8

Characteristics
- Type: Scd(f)
- Size: ~99,000 ly (30.3 kpc) (estimated)
- Apparent size (V): 3.23′ × 0.57′

Other designations
- IRAS 12121+0605, UGC 7247, MCG +01-31-029, PGC 39114, CGCG 041-052, VV 520

NGC 4197 is a spiral galaxy in the constellation Virgo. The galaxy lies about 90 million light years away from Earth, which means, given its apparent dimensions, that NGC 4197 is approximately 100,000 light years across. It was discovered by William Herschel on April 13, 1784.

== Characteristics ==
NGC 4197 is a spiral galaxy seen nearly edge-on, at an angle of 79°. Two faint plumes are visible in H-alpha in the galactic halo southeast of the galaxy, extending for about 5 kiloparsec. The observed plumes are probably associated with HII regions in the disk. About 13% of the H-alpha emission of the galaxy comes from extraplanar gas, with an estimated mass of 1.0×10^{8} M_{☉}. The star formation rate of the galaxy is estimated to be about 1 M_{☉} per year.

A strong point-like X-ray source has been detected at the centre of the galaxy, lying 0.7 arcseconds from the nucleus as reported in the red band of the Sloan Digital Sky Survey. Its spectrum is well described by a power law with an absorption element. The X-ray luminosity is estimated to be 1.4+0.7
−0.3×10^{40} erg/s. The source of the X-rays could be a black hole in the nucleus or a stellar mass ultraluminous X-ray source. The mass of the central black hole is estimated to be 2×10^{5} M_{☉} based on the spiral pitch angle and 7×10^{4} M_{☉} based on the stellar mass.

== Nearby galaxies ==
NGC 4197 is a member of the NGC 4261 Group, also known as LGG 278. Other members of the group include NGC 4180, NGC 4215, NGC 4241, NGC 4260, NGC 4261, NGC 4233, and NGC 4234. Makarov et al considers LGG 281, which includes NGC 4235, NGC 4264, NGC 4268, NGC 4270, NGC 4273, NGC 4281, NGC 4292, NGC 4300, NGC 4378, and NGC 4412, to be also part of the same group.
