= NGC 5532 =

Galaxy in the constellation of Boötes

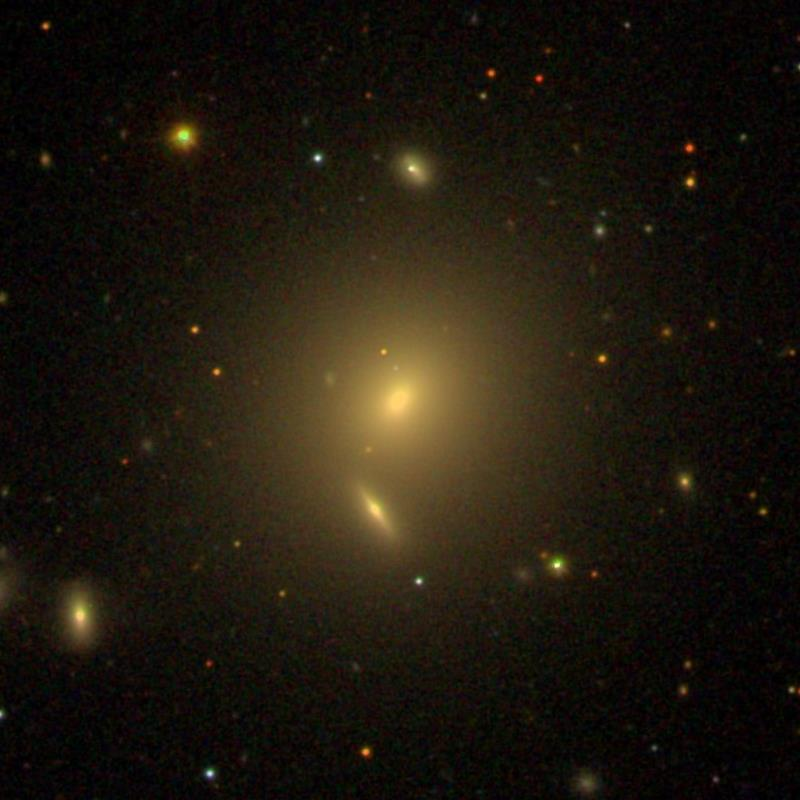
- NGC 5532 by SDSS

Observation data (J2000 epoch)
- Constellation: Boötes
- Right ascension: 14^{h} 16^{m} 52.9^{s}
- Declination: +10° 48′ 27″
- Redshift: 0.024710 ± 0.000010
- Heliocentric radial velocity: 7,408 ± 3 km/s
- Distance: 210 ± 85 Mly (64.5 ± 26.1 Mpc)
- Apparent magnitude (V): 12.59

Characteristics
- Type: D
- Apparent size (V): 1.32′ × 1.02′
- Notable features: Radio galaxy

Other designations
- UGC 9137, 3C 296, 4C +10.39, MCG +02-36-062, PKS 1414+11, PGC 51006

NGC 5532 is an elliptical galaxy located in the constellation Boötes. It is located at a distance of about 250 million light years from Earth, which, given its apparent dimensions, means that NGC 5532 is about 110,000 light years across. It was discovered by William Herschel on March 15, 1784. It is a Fanaroff–Riley type 1 (FR1) radio galaxy.

NGC 5532 is an elliptical galaxy located in a galaxy group. In the centre of the galaxy lies a warped disk, while the isophotes display boxiness and the centre of the galaxy doesn't coincide with the isophotal centre. The core appears obstructed in X-rays, with a column density of (1.0±0.5)×10^{22} cm^{−2}, which is considered high for a FR1 galaxy. In the centre of the galaxy lies a supermassive black hole whose mass is estimated to be 10^{8.8} (630 millions) M_{☉} based on the M–sigma relation.

Two straight radio jets emerge from the galaxy core and form sharp edged lobes that appear to engulf the jets, although this could be a projection effect. The jets are typical of a Fanaroff–Riley type 1 radio galaxy, with faint bases that brighten abruptly 2.7 arcseconds from the nucleus and then the brightness gets lower at the distance from the core increases. The jet appears moving with relativistic speeds, 0.8 times the speed of light at the start of the jet. The northern jet has been observed in X-rays by the Chandra X-ray Observatory, with emission detected at distances between 2 and 10 arcseconds from the core.

NGC 5532 is located in a galaxy group that also includes the galaxy NGC 5531. NGC 5532 forms a pair with lenticular galaxy NGC 5532A, which lies at a distance of about 16 kpc. 21 galaxies have been as members of the group, lying within one megaparsec from NGC 5532.

== Supernovae ==
Two supernovae have been observed in NGC 5532:

- SN 2007ao (Type Ia-pec mag. 17.7) was discovered by Tim Puckett and R. Gagliano on 13 March 2007.
- SN 2023omo (Type Ia-91bg-like, mag. 18.34) was discovered by The Young Supernova Experiment (YSE) on 4 August 2023.

== Gallery ==
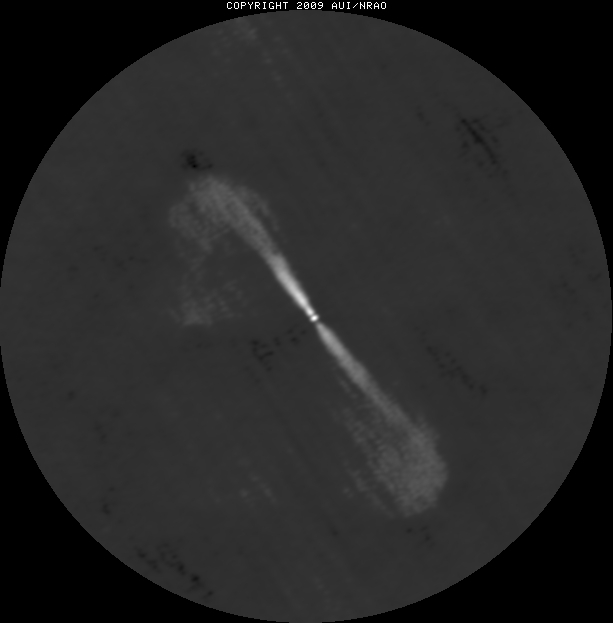
NGC 5532 in radio waves by the Very Large Array

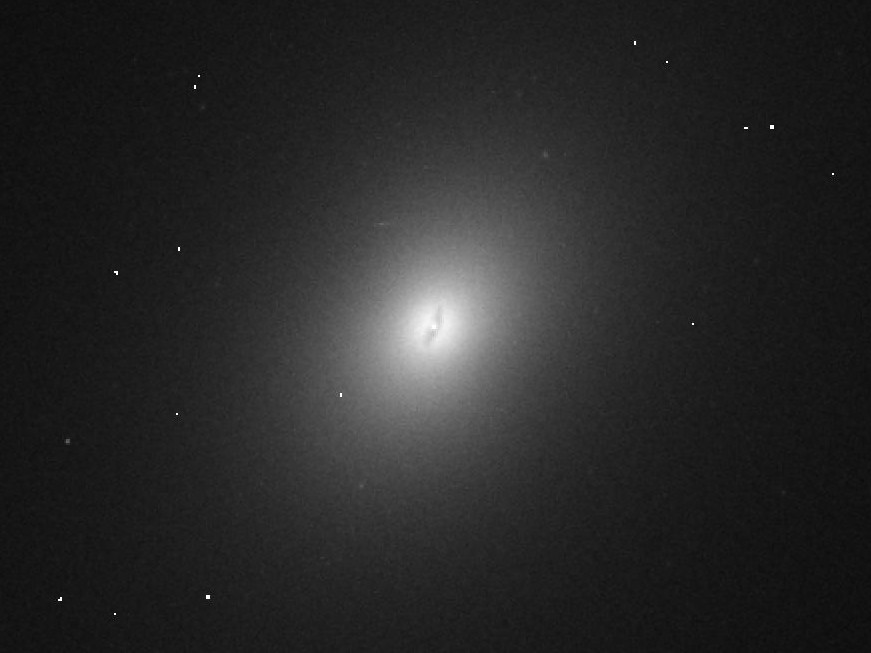
The central region of NGC 5532 imaged by the Hubble Space Telescope

== See also ==
- NGC 4261 - a similar radio galaxy
