= NGC 4578 =

Galaxy in the constellation Virgo

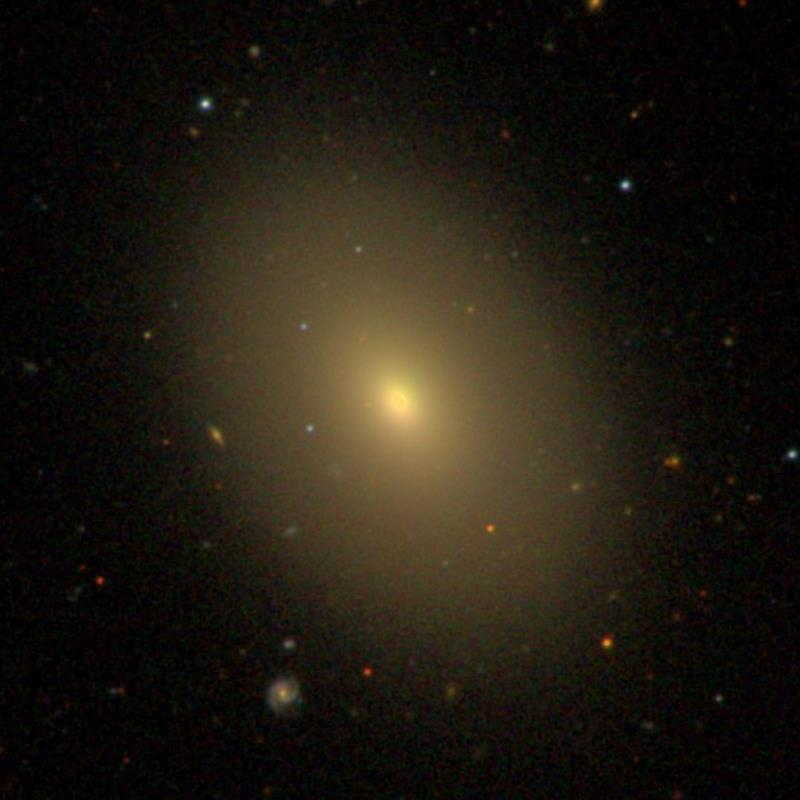
- SDSS image of NGC 4578

Observation data (J2000 epoch)
- Constellation: Virgo
- Right ascension: 12^{h} 37^{m} 30.5^{s}
- Declination: 09° 33′ 18″
- Redshift: 0.007645
- Heliocentric radial velocity: 2292 km/s
- Distance: 55.65 Mly (17.062 Mpc)
- Group or cluster: Virgo Cluster
- Apparent magnitude (V): 12.38

Characteristics
- Type: SA0^0(r)
- Size: ~53,600 ly (16.44 kpc) (estimated)
- Apparent size (V): 3.3 x 2.5

Other designations
- CGCG 70-195, MCG 2-32-159, PGC 42149, UGC 7793, VCC 1720

NGC 4578 is a lenticular galaxy located about 55 million light-years away in the constellation Virgo. NGC 4578 was discovered by astronomer William Herschel on January 18, 1784 and is a member of the Virgo Cluster.

== See also ==
- List of NGC objects (4001–5000)
- NGC 4365
