= NGC 4324 =

Galaxy in the constellation of Virgo

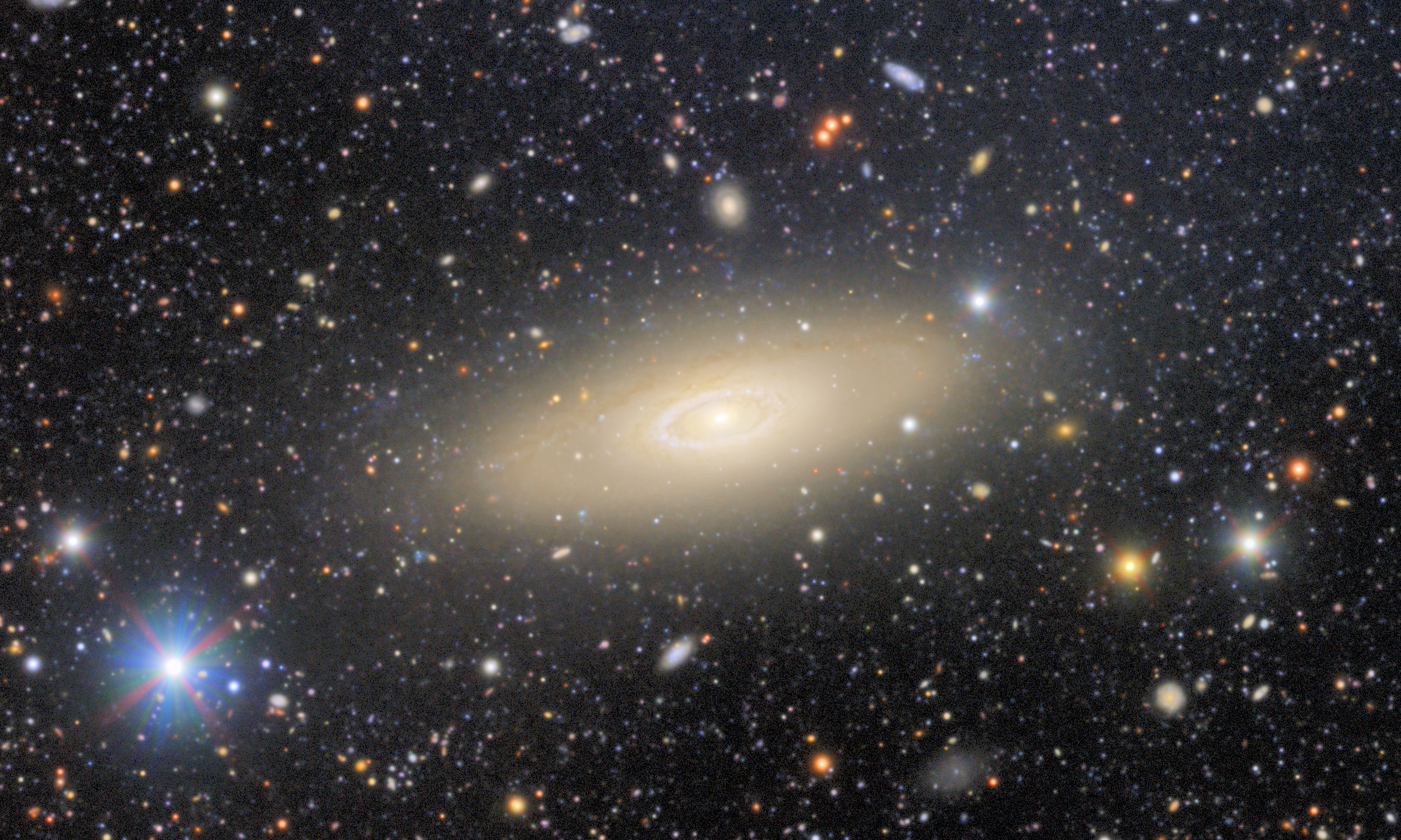
- NGC 4324 imaged by the Vera C. Rubin Observatory

Observation data (J2000 epoch)
- Constellation: Virgo
- Right ascension: 12^{h} 23^{m} 06.2^{s}
- Declination: 05° 15′ 01″
- Redshift: 0.005561
- Heliocentric radial velocity: 1667 km/s
- Distance: 85.4 Mly (26.18 Mpc)
- Group or cluster: Virgo W
- Apparent magnitude (V): 12.51

Characteristics
- Type: SA(r)0+
- Mass: 5.25 × 10^{11} M_{☉}
- Size: ~66,000 ly (20.2 kpc) (estimated)
- Apparent size (V): 2.8 x 1.2
- Notable features: Star Forming Ring

Other designations
- UGC 07451, VCC 0613, PGC 040179, MCG +01-32-032

NGC 4324 is a lenticular galaxy located about 85 million light-years away in the constellation Virgo. It was discovered by astronomer Heinrich d'Arrest on March 4, 1862. NGC 4324 has a stellar mass of 5.62 × 10^{10} M_{☉}, and a baryonic mass of 5.88 × 10^{10} M_{☉}. The galaxy's total mass is around 5.25 × 10^{11} M_{☉}. NGC 4324 is notable for having a ring of star formation surrounding its nucleus. It was considered a member of the Virgo II Groups until 1999, when its distance was recalculated and it was placed in the Virgo W Group.

== Physical characteristics ==
First discovered in 1957 by Russian astronomer Kirill Ogorodnikov and described by Ogorodnikov as "a system of planet-like concentrations similar to beads" and as "equally-spaced bead-like concentrations of equal size and brightness similar to the annular nebula of Kant-Lapace nebular hypothesis.", NGC 4324 features an inner ring that surrounds the nucleus. The ring appears complete but broken on opposite sides of its diameter which led to Burstein et al. suggesting that the ring is not a ring at all but instead tightly wound spiral arms and that NGC 4324 is a misclassified spiral or lenticular galaxy. Despite this, the ring is considered to be a true ring. The ring hosts most of the molecular gas observed in NGC 4324 with roughly 1.7 billion M_{☉} of HI (neutral hydrogen) and 9 × 10^{7} M_{☉} of HII (singly-ionised hydrogen). Despite this, HI was detected by Duprie et al. in 1996 that extends roughly 2 optical diameters suggesting that atomic hydrogen is not only concentrated in the ring.

In Ultraviolet light, the ring is bright, due to the presence of star formation that is occurring at an estimated rate of roughly 0.052 ± 0.021 M_{☉} per year, with star formation being segregated in the ring. In between the ring and the bulge of NGC 4324, there are tightly wound spiral arms that are defined mostly by dust.

The gas in the ring in NGC 4324 may have been accredited from filaments of galaxies or minor merging with gas-rich satellite galaxies.

=== Stellar populations ===
In the center of NGC 4324, the stellar population has a mean age of about 8 billion years, with an abundance ratio that is close to the sun, at [Mg/Fe] 0, and a metallicity that is slightly supersolar, at [Z/H] ~ +0.1. This suggests continuous effective star formation in the nucleus of NGC 4324. In the bulge of NGC 4324, the mean age of the stellar population is around 13 billion years, with abundance ratio of [Mg/Fe] = +0.15, and a metallicity of [Z/H] = −0.2 L −0.3. In the inner part of the disk of NGC 4324, the stellar population is old, with an abundance ratio of [Mg/Fe] = +0.2, and a metallicity of [Z/H] < −0.33. Such characteristics imply a brief single starburst took place more than 10 billion ago and formed the stellar disk of NGC 4324. In the ring-dominated area of the disk, the dominant stellar population is also old, despite being slightly younger than in the inner disk, and has chemical properties similar to the stars of the inner disk.

=== Activity ===
NGC 4324 is classified as a Seyfert Galaxy and as a LINER galaxy. Despite being classified as a Seyfert galaxy, NGC 4324 has no delectable nuclear radio continuum emission lines, suggesting that the emission lines that led to its classification as a Seyfert come from stellar processes such as photoionization driven by supernova remnants and/or planetary nebulae which can mimic the high-ionization nebular emission characteristic of the nuclei of other observed Seyfert Galaxies. This is despite the fact that NGC 4324 is host to a supermassive black hole with an estimated mass of 2.187 million M_{☉}.

== Group membership ==
NGC 4324 is listed as member of the Virgo S Cloud, which is also known as the Virgo Southern Extension or the Virgo II Groups. It was placed in the NGC 4303 Group by P. Fouque et al. and A. M. Garcia et al. in 1992 and 1993 respectively, which is centered on the galaxy NGC 4303, which considered part of the Virgo Southern Extension. However, later distance measurements made with the Tully-Fisher method showed that NGC 4324 was not part of the NGC 4303 Group but was instead a member of the Virgo W Group, which lies at twice the distance of the Virgo Cluster and is centered on the elliptical galaxy NGC 4261.

== See also ==
- List of NGC objects (4001–5000)
- NGC 7217
- NGC 7742
