= Virgo W' Cloud =

Galaxy cluster in constellation Virgo

- NGC 4365, the largest and brightest galaxy in the Virgo W' Cloud as imaged by the Vera Rubin Observatory

Observation data (Epoch J2000)
- Constellation: Virgo
- Right ascension: 12^{h} 24^{m} 00^{s}
- Declination: 07° 12′ 00″
- Brightest member: NGC 4365
- Number of galaxies: 28
- Velocity dispersion: 416 km/s
- Redshift: 1019 km/s
- Distance: 23 Mpc (75.0 Mly)
- Binding mass: 0.15-0.83×10^{14} M_{☉}

Other designations
- Virgo W' Group, NBGG 11-05

The Virgo W' Cloud is a group of galaxies located about 23 Mpc (75.0 Mly) away in the constellation Virgo, centered on the giant elliptical galaxy NGC 4365.

The group lies about 50% further away than the main Virgo Cluster, lying between the Virgo Cluster and the Virgo W Cloud with all three groups connected by a filament of galaxies.

The Virgo W' Cloud was first isolated by astronomer Gérard de Vaucouleurs in 1961.

== Physical characteristics ==
The Virgo W' Cloud appears to lie between the Virgo B Subcluster centered on Messier 49, and the Virgo W Cloud centered on NGC 4261. It connects the two structures though a filament that starts at the Virgo W Cloud, wraps around a void of galaxies, and connects with the Virgo Southern Extension that connects with the Virgo B Subcluster in the Virgo Cluster. The Virgo W' Cloud lies about 6 Mpc (19.6 Mly) behind the main body of the Virgo Cluster. This filament extends to a length of about 15 Mpc (48.9 Mly) behind the Virgo Cluster, with the Virgo W' Cloud described as a ''compact knot'' within this filament.

The Virgo W' Cloud is infalling toward the Virgo B Subcluster.

== Members ==
The table below lists galaxies that Binggeli et al. established in 1993 are members of the Virgo W' Cloud:

Members of the Virgo W' Cloud
Name	Type	R.A. (J2000)	Dec. (J2000)	Redshift (km/s)	Apparent Magnitude
VCC 329	Irr?	12^{h} 19^{m} 13.8^{s}	05° 59′ 09″	1622	16.8
VCC 340	BCD	12^{h} 19^{m} 22.1^{s}	05° 54′ 38″	1505	14.7
VCC 509 (UGC 07423)	Sm	12^{h} 21^{m} 55.5^{s}	06° 27′ 02″	1257	15.55
VCC 534 (NGC 4309)	SAB0^+(r)	12^{h} 22^{m} 12.3^{s}	07° 08′ 40″	1043	13.6
VCC 566	SBmIII	12^{h} 22^{m} 37.8^{s}	08° 17′ 48″	1410	15.8
VCC 593 (IC 3229)	Sbc	12^{h} 22^{m} 52.8^{s}	06° 40′ 48″	1548	15.1
VCC 648 (NGC 4339)	E0	12^{h} 23^{m} 34.9^{s}	06° 04′ 55″	1266	12.26
VCC 656 (NGC 4343)	SA(rs)b	12^{h} 23^{m} 38.6^{s}	06° 57′ 14″	993	13.3
VCC 657 (NGC 4342)	S0-	12^{h} 23^{m} 39.0^{s}	07° 03′ 14″	761	13.41
VCC 667 (IC 3259)	SAB(s)dm?	12^{h} 23^{m} 48.5^{s}	07° 11′ 12″	1424	14.2
VCC 672 (NGC 4341)	SAB(s)0^0^	12^{h} 23^{m} 53.5^{s}	07° 06′ 26″	913	14.0
VCC 697 (IC 3267)	SA(s)cd	12^{h} 24^{m} 05.5^{s}	07° 02′ 29″	1237	14.2
VCC 890	BCD?	12^{h} 26^{m} 21.5^{s}	06° 40′ 10″	1499	16.6
VCC 989	S?	12^{h} 27^{m} 17.6^{s}	07° 40′ 13″	1846	15.8

In 2007, Mei et al. used SBF Distance measurements from the Hubble Space Telescope to demonstrate that 5 galaxies, VCC 538 (NGC 4309A), VCC 571, VCC 575 (NGC 4318), VCC 731 (NGC 4365), and VCC 1025 (NGC 4434) that were originally classified as members of the Virgo B Subcluster in (Binggeli et al. 1993) are actually members of the Virgo W' Cloud.

Later SBF Distance measurements done by Cantiello et al. in 2018 with the Canada–France–Hawaii Telescope (CHFT), concluded that the galaxies VCC 648 (NGC 4339) and VCC 657 (NGC 4342), were part of the Virgo W' Cloud, though already as far back as 1988 and 1993 respectively, Brent Tully and Binggeli et al. both conluded that NGC 4339 was a member of the Virgo W' Cloud, with Binggeli et al. in 1993 coming to the conclusion that NGC 4342 is a member of the Virgo W' Cloud.

== See also ==
- List of Galaxy Groups
- Virgo Cluster
- Virgo W Cloud
