= NGC 4318 =

Galaxy in the constellation Virgo

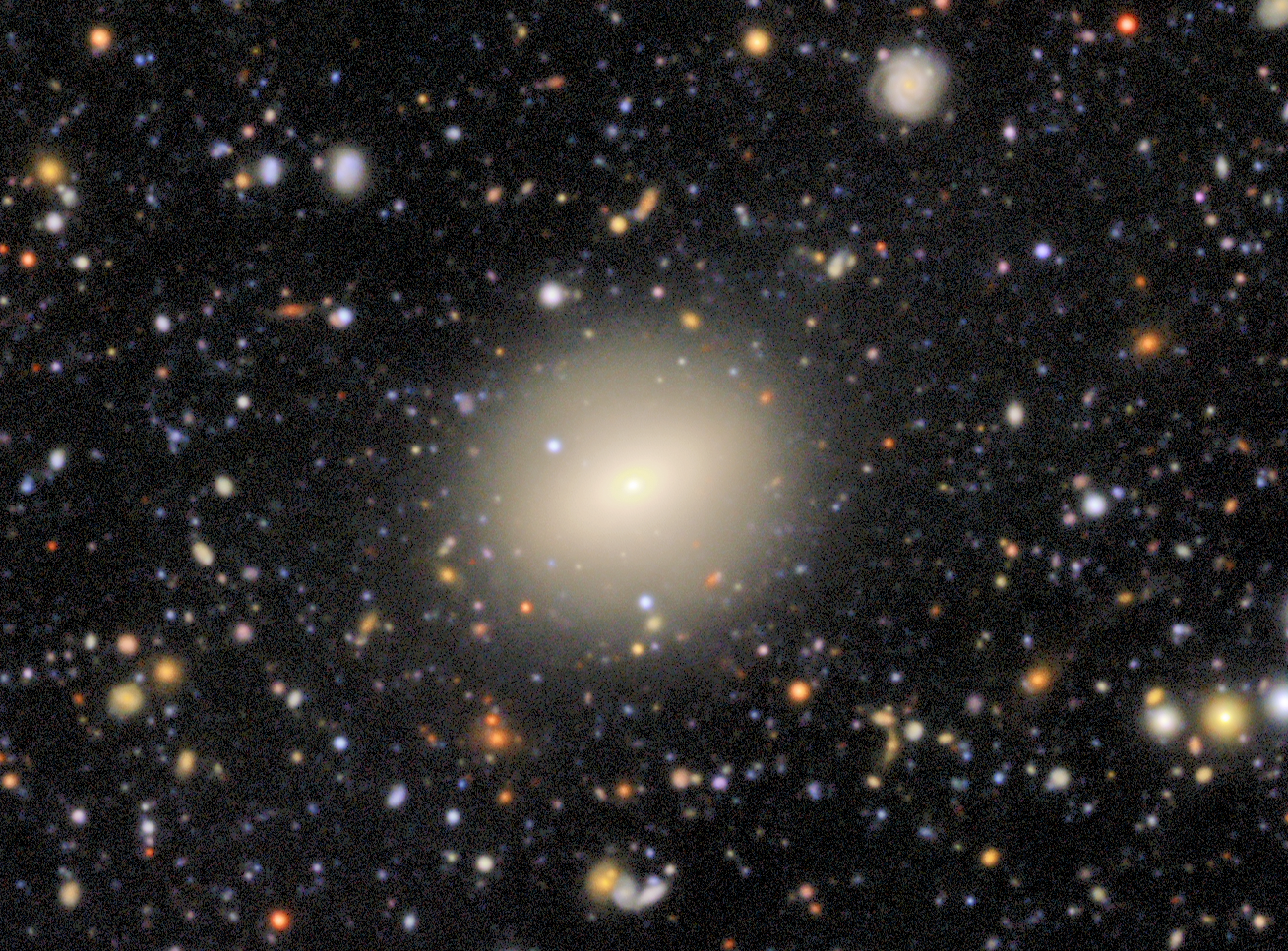
- NGC 4318 imaged by the Vera C. Rubin Observatory

Observation data (J2000 epoch)
- Constellation: Virgo
- Right ascension: 12^{h} 22^{m} 43.3^{s}
- Declination: 08° 11′ 54″
- Redshift: 0.004106
- Heliocentric radial velocity: 1231 km/s
- Distance: 72 Mly (22 Mpc)
- Group or cluster: Virgo W' Cloud
- Apparent magnitude (V): 13.8

Characteristics
- Type: S0
- Mass: 7.2×10^{09} M_{☉}
- Size: ~22,000 ly (6.7 kpc) (estimated)
- Apparent size (V): 0.84 x 0.69

Other designations
- UGC 07446, VCC 0575, PGC 040122, MCG +02-32-015

NGC 4318 is a small lenticular galaxy located about 72 million light-years away in the constellation Virgo. It was discovered by astronomer John Herschel on January 18, 1828. NGC 4318 is a member of the Virgo W' Cloud, a group of galaxies in the background of the Virgo Cluster that is centered on the giant elliptical galaxy NGC 4365.

== Physical characteristics ==
NGC 4318 contains a small, classical bulge and a nuclear stellar disc with a diameter of ~230 ly (70 pc). Outside the nuclear stellar disc lies a sharply bounded, low surface brightness region with a diameter of ~1,800 ly (560 pc) beyond which lies a larger outer disk.

== Black Hole ==
NGC 4318 harbors a supermassive black hole with an estimated mass of 4 million (5×10^{6} M☉) solar masses.

== Globular clusters ==
NGC 4318 is surrounded by 18 globular clusters.

== See also ==
- List of NGC objects (4001–5000)
