= NGC 4343 =

Unbarred spiral galaxy in the constellation of Virgo

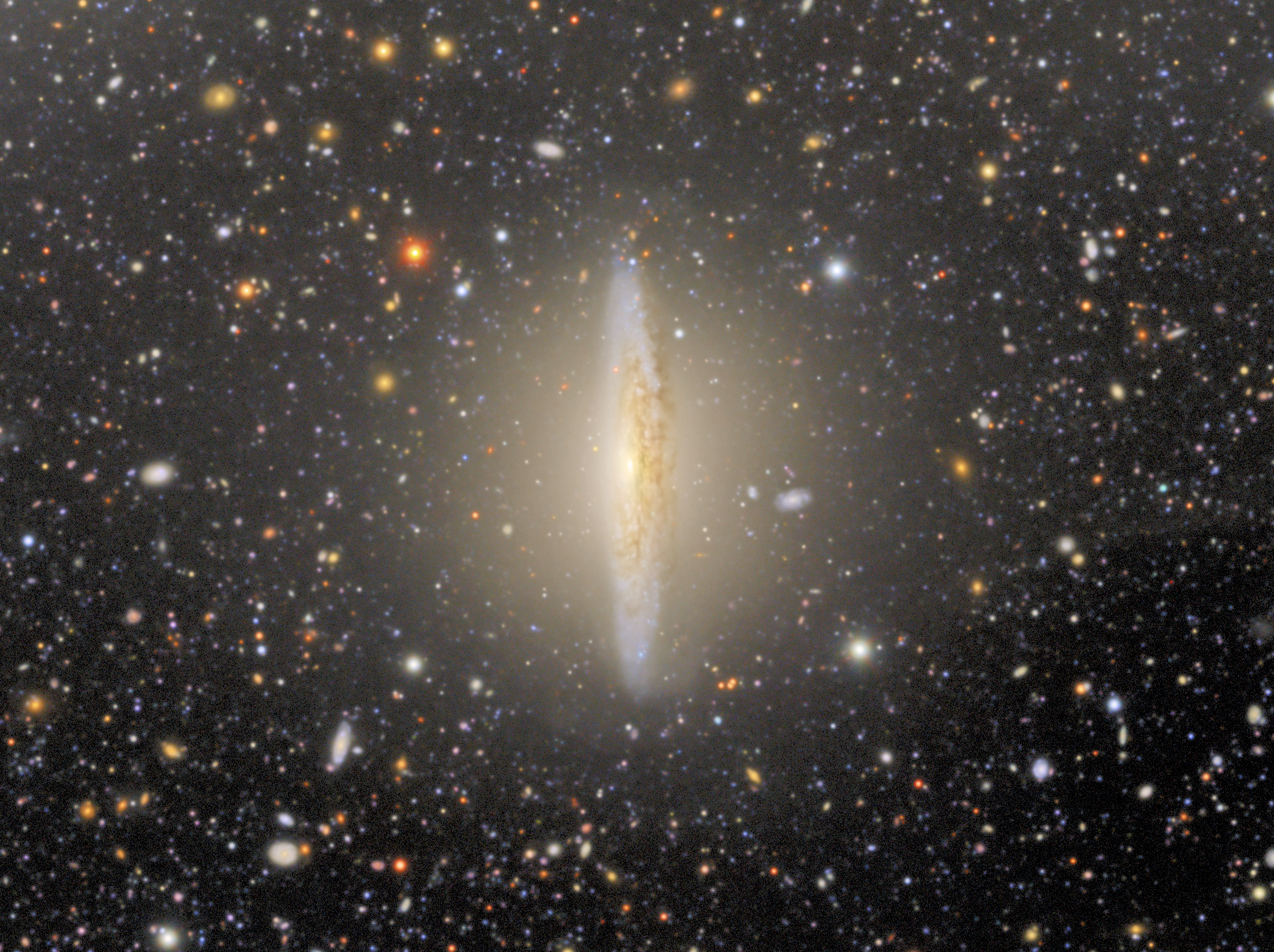
- NGC 4343 imaged by the Vera C. Rubin Observatory

Observation data (J2000 epoch)
- Constellation: Virgo
- Right ascension: 12^{h} 23^{m} 38.69184^{s}
- Declination: +06° 57′ 14.7024″
- Redshift: 0.00333
- Heliocentric radial velocity: 997 ± 21 km/s
- Distance: 80.1 Mly (24.55 Mpc)
- Group or cluster: Virgo W' Cloud
- Apparent magnitude (V): 12.29
- Apparent magnitude (B): 13.31

Characteristics
- Type: SA(rs)b:

Other designations
- UGC 7465, MCG +01-32-038, PGC 40251

NGC 4343 is an unbarred spiral galaxy in the constellation Virgo. It was discovered by the astronomer William Herschel on April 13, 1784. At a distance of 80 million light-years (25 Mpc), it is a member of the Virgo W' Cloud, a group of galaxies located lies about 6 Mpc (19.6 Mly) behind the main body of the Virgo Cluster. It contains an active galactic nucleus.

== Gallery ==
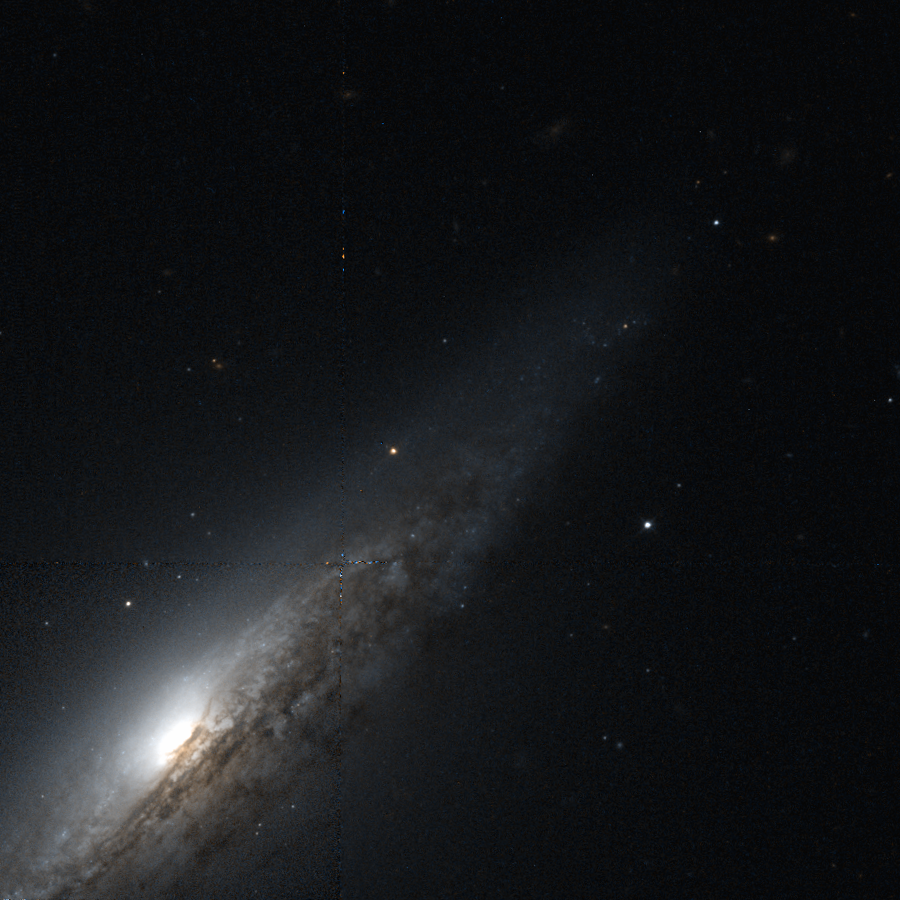
HST image of NGC 4343

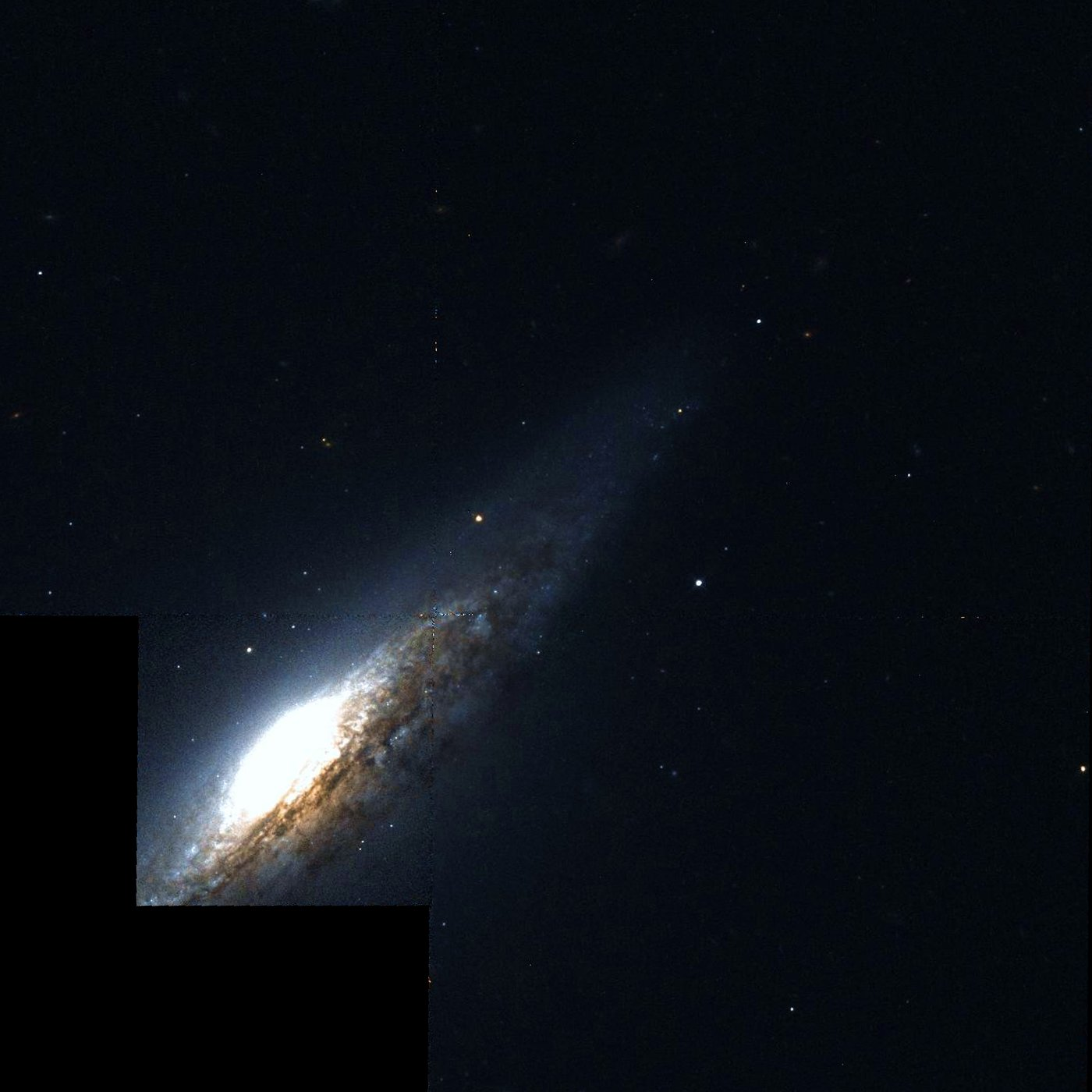
NGC 4343 by Hubble Space Telescope

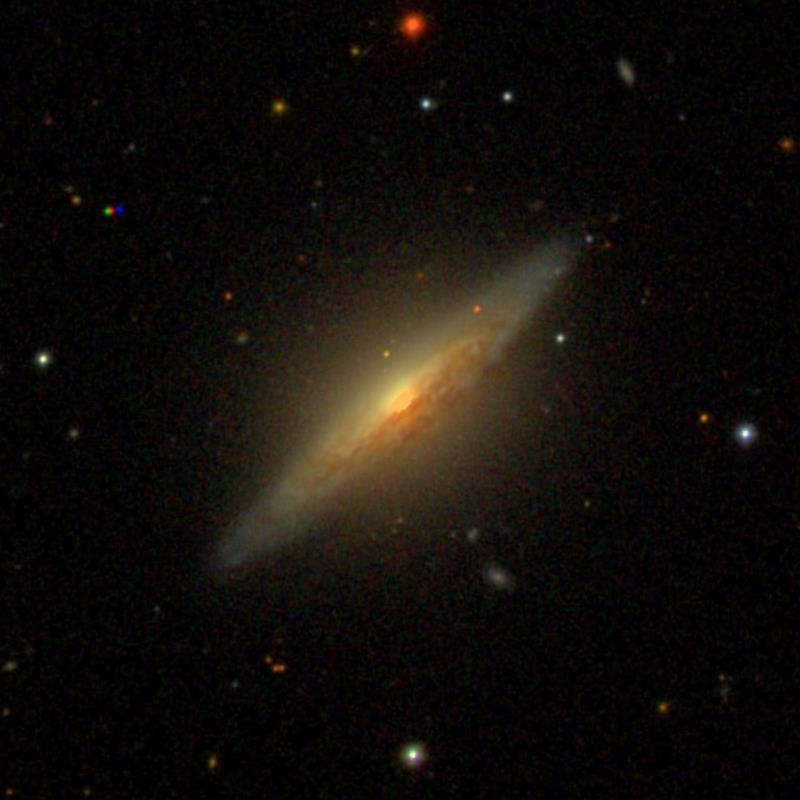
SDSS image of NGC 4343
