= NGC 4309 =

Galaxy in the constellation Virgo

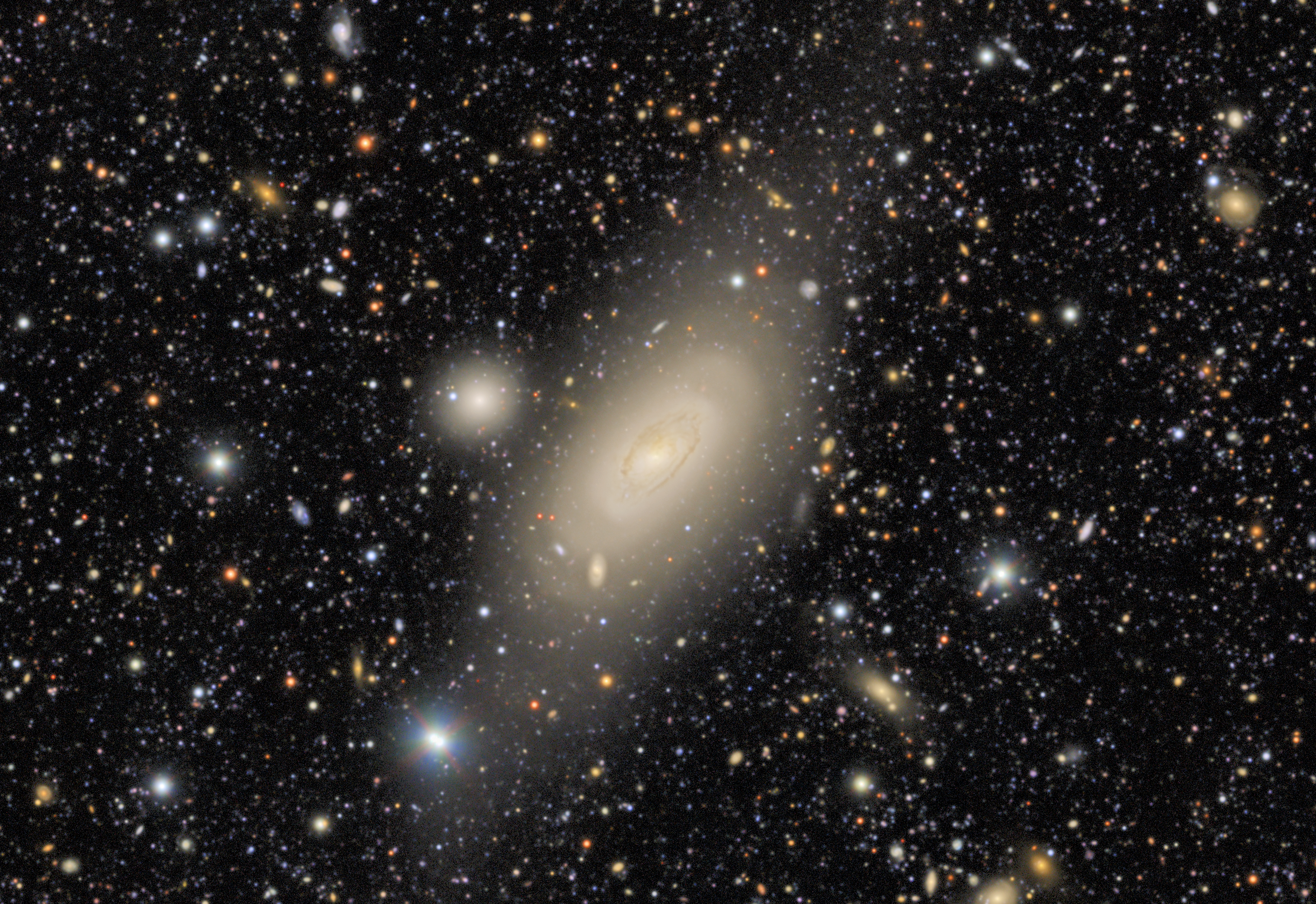
- NGC 4309 imaged by the Vera C. Rubin Observatory

Observation data (J2000 epoch)
- Constellation: Virgo
- Right ascension: 12^{h} 22^{m} 12.3567^{s}
- Declination: +07° 08′ 39.632″
- Redshift: 0.003479±0.0000111
- Heliocentric radial velocity: 1,043±3 km/s km/s
- Distance: 66.7 ± 4.8 Mly (20.44 ± 1.48 Mpc)
- Group or cluster: Virgo W' Cloud
- Apparent magnitude (V): 13.6

Characteristics
- Type: SAB0^+(r)
- Size: ~63,600 ly (19.50 kpc) (estimated)
- Apparent size (V): 2.01′ × 0.91′

Other designations
- VCC 0534, HOLM 382A, IRAS 12196+0725, UGC 7435, MCG +01-32-025, PGC 40051, CGCG 042-051

NGC 4309 is a lenticular galaxy located about 55 million light-years away in the constellation Virgo. The galaxy was discovered by astronomer Christian Peters in 1881 and is a member of the Virgo W' Cloud, a group of galaxies located lies about 6 Mpc (19.6 Mly) behind the main body of the Virgo Cluster.

NGC 4309 is classified as an AGN and has undergone ram-pressure stripping.

== Globular clusters ==
Within a distance of 160,000 ly (50 kpc) from NGC 4309 exists a population of 162 globular clusters that surround the galaxy.

== Gallery ==
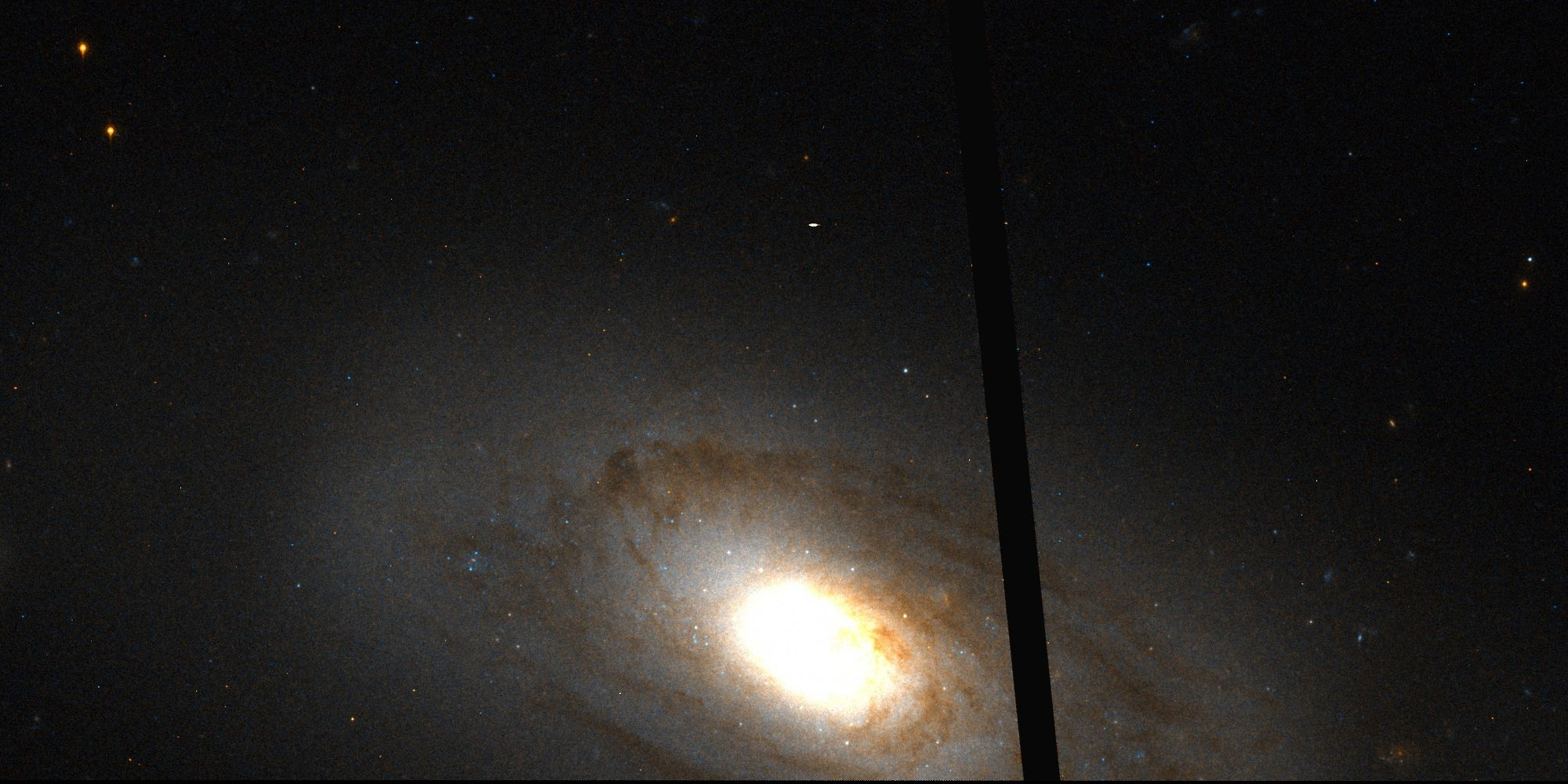
HST image of NGC 4309

== See also ==
- List of NGC objects (4001–5000)
