= NGC 4378 =

Galaxy in the constellation Coma Berenices

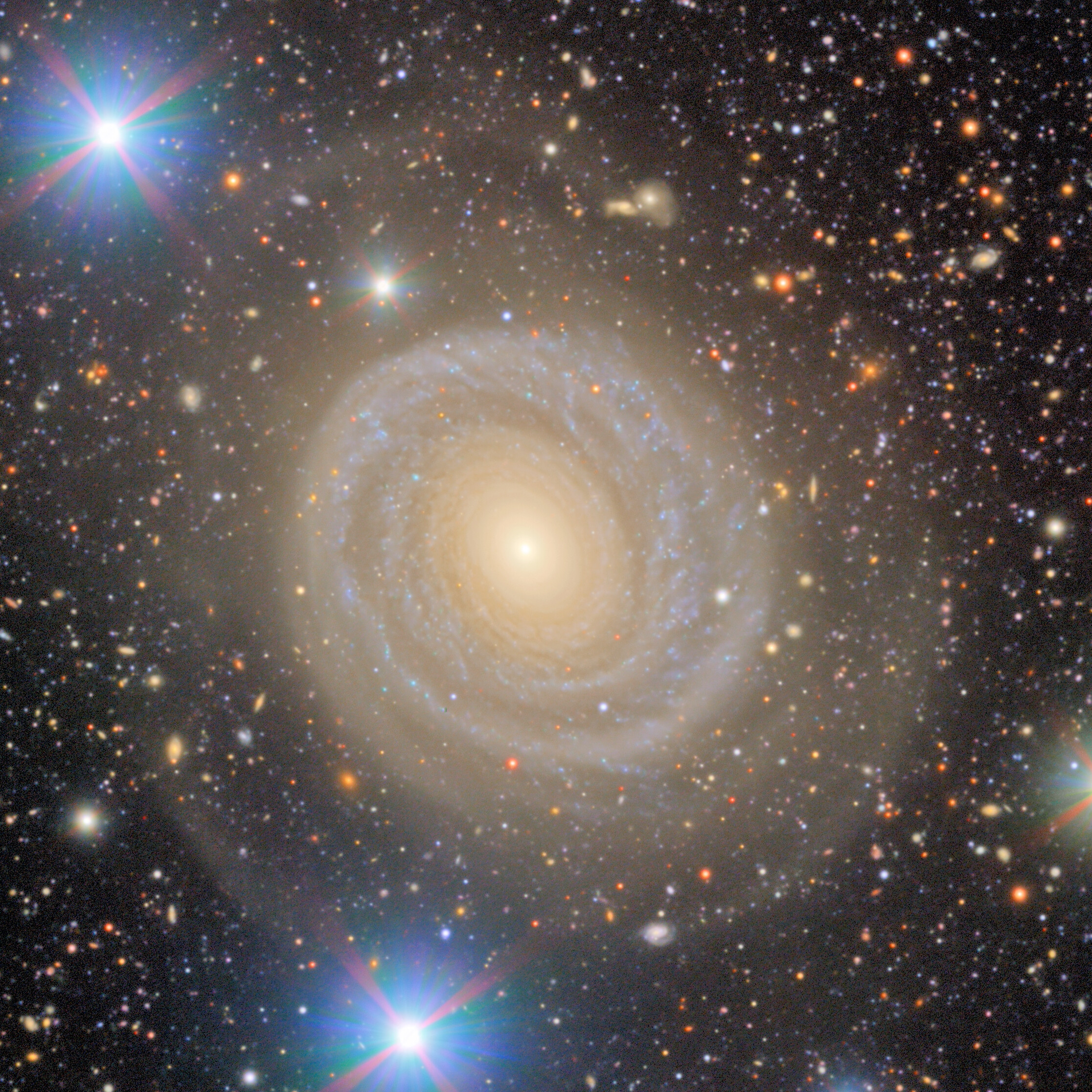
- NGC 4378 imaged by the Vera C. Rubin Observatory

Observation data (J2000 epoch)
- Constellation: Virgo
- Right ascension: 12^{h} 25^{m} 18.1071^{s}
- Declination: +04° 55′ 30.524″
- Redshift: 0.008536±0.00001
- Heliocentric radial velocity: 2,559±3 km/s
- Distance: 136.50 ± 16.23 Mly (41.850 ± 4.975 Mpc)
- Group or cluster: Virgo Cluster
- Apparent magnitude (V): 12.63

Characteristics
- Type: (R)SA(s)a
- Size: ~131,000 ly (40.17 kpc) (estimated)
- Apparent size (V): 2.9′ × 2.7′

Other designations
- VCC 785, IRAS F12227+0512, 2MASX J12251807+0455300, UGC 7497, MCG +01-32-052, PGC 40490, CGCG 042-092

NGC 4378 is a spiral galaxy in the constellation of Virgo. Its velocity with respect to the cosmic microwave background is 2,903±24 km/s, which corresponds to a Hubble distance of 139.7 ± 9.8 Mly (42.82 ± 3.02 Mpc). Also, six non-redshift measurements give a similar distance of 136.50 ± 16.23 Mly (41.850 ± 4.975 Mpc). It was discovered by German-British astronomer William Herschel on 2 February 1786. It is a member of the Virgo Cluster, listed as VCC 785.

NGC 4378 is a Seyfert II galaxy, i.e. it has a quasar-like nucleus with very high surface brightnesses whose spectra reveal strong, high-ionisation emission lines, but unlike quasars, the host galaxy is clearly detectable.

== Supermassive black hole ==
A study based on near-infrared K-band luminosity measurements of the NGC 4378 bulge gives a value of 10^{8.0} M_{☉} (100 million solar masses) for the supermassive black hole there.

According to the authors of a paper published in 2012, knowledge of the mass of a central black hole and the rate of accretion by it makes it possible to estimate the rate of star formation in the central region of Seyfert-type galaxies. The rate for NGC 4378 would be between 0.059M_{☉} / year and 0.56M_{☉} / year, respectively, within and outside a radius of 1 kpc.

== See also ==
- List of NGC objects (4001–5000)
