= NGC 4277 =

Galaxy in the constellation Virgo

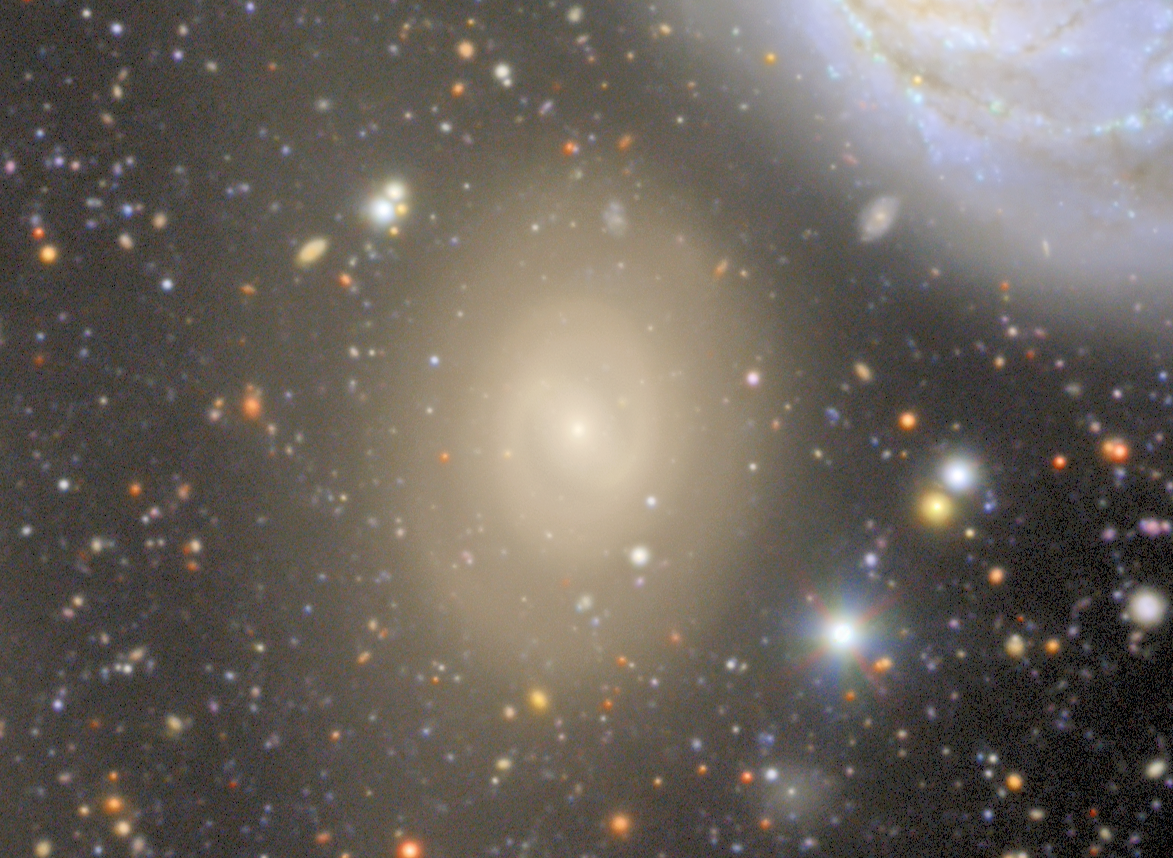
- NGC 4277 imaged by the Vera C. Rubin Observatory

Observation data (J2000 epoch)
- Constellation: Virgo
- Right ascension: 12^{h} 20^{m} 03.7208^{s}
- Declination: +05° 20′ 28.904″
- Redshift: 0.007295±0.00000667
- Heliocentric radial velocity: 2,187±2 km/s
- Distance: 121.9 ± 8.6 Mly (37.37 ± 2.64 Mpc)
- Group or cluster: Virgo Cluster
- Apparent magnitude (V): 14.2g

Characteristics
- Type: SAB0/a?(rs)
- Size: ~21,000 ly (6.45 kpc) (estimated)
- Apparent size (V): 1.13′ × 0.81′

Other designations
- HOLM 368F, VCC 386, 2MASX J12200369+0520161, MCG +01-32-009, PGC 39759, CGCG 042-029

NGC 4277 is an intermediate spiral galaxy in the constellation of Virgo. Its velocity with respect to the cosmic microwave background is 2,533±24 km/s, which corresponds to a Hubble distance of 121.9 ± 8.6 Mly (37.37 ± 2.64 Mpc). It was discovered by German-British astronomer William Herschel on 17 April 1786.

NGC 4277 has a possible active galactic nucleus, i.e. it has a compact region at the center of a galaxy that emits a significant amount of energy across the electromagnetic spectrum, with characteristics indicating that this luminosity is not produced by the stars.

== Virgo cluster ==
NGC 4277 is a member of the Virgo Cluster.

== Supernova ==
One Supernova has been observed in NGC 4277:

- SN 2020ftl (Type Ia, mag. 18.5) was discovered by the Catalina Real-time Transient Survey and Mirco Villi on 2 April 2020.

== Image gallery ==
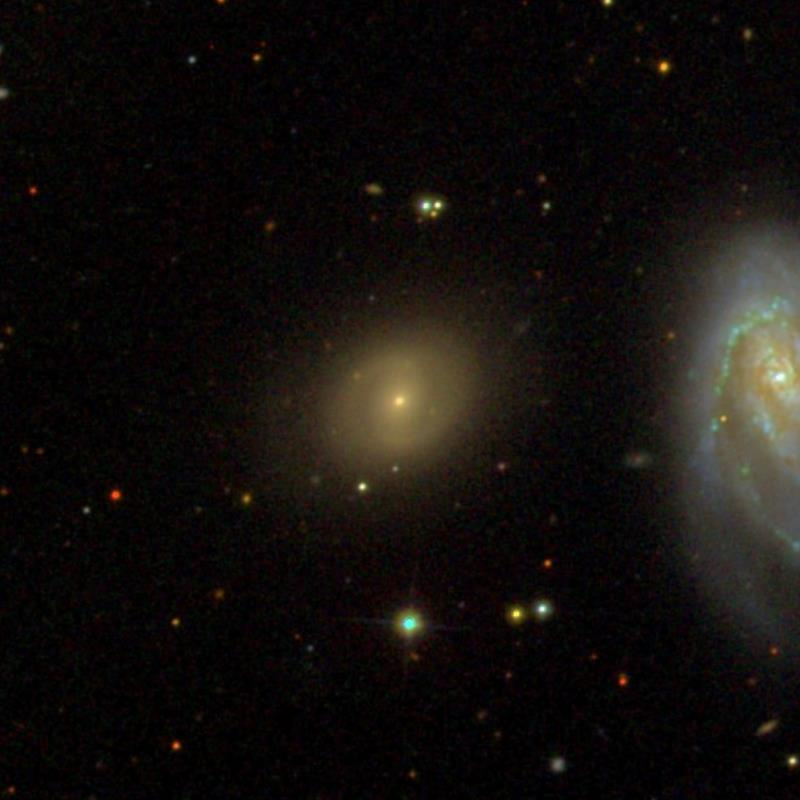
NGC 6993 imaged by SDSS

== See also ==
- List of NGC objects (4001–5000)
