= NGC 4261 =

Galaxy in the constellation Virgo

- NGC 4261 imaged by the Vera C. Rubin Observatory

Observation data (J2000 epoch)
- Constellation: Virgo
- Right ascension: 12^{h} 19^{m} 23.21606^{s}
- Declination: +05° 49′ 29.7000″
- Redshift: 0.007261±0.0000102
- Heliocentric radial velocity: 2,177±3 km/s
- Distance: 95.9 ± 8.5 Mly (29.4 ± 2.6 Mpc)
- Group or cluster: NGC 4261 group, Virgo Cluster
- Apparent magnitude (V): 12.87
- Apparent magnitude (B): 13.92

Characteristics
- Type: E2
- Size: ~156,600 ly (48.01 kpc) (estimated)
- Apparent size (V): 4.17′ × 3.39′

Other designations
- VCC 345, UGC 7360, MCG +01-31-052, PGC 39659, CGCG 042-013

NGC 4261 is an elliptical galaxy located around 100 million light-years away in the constellation Virgo. It was discovered by German-British astronomer William Herschel on April 13, 1784. The galaxy is a member of its own somewhat meager galaxy group known as the NGC 4261 group, which is part of the Virgo Cluster.

The morphological classification of this galaxy is E2, indicating an elliptical galaxy with a 5:4 ratio between the major and minor axes. The stellar population of the galaxy is old, showing no indications of recent mergers or interactions with other members of its group. Large-scale isophotes of the galaxy are generally boxy in form, with no markers that would suggest a disruptive interaction within the last billion years. There is a dust lane along the north–south axis of the galaxy and a disk of dust around the nucleus.

Two prominent jets emanating from the nucleus can be observed in the radio band. It has an active galactic nucleus with a supermassive black hole somewhat offset from the center of the core. The black hole is estimated to have a mass of (1.62±0.04)×10^{9} M_{☉}. The galaxy is estimated to be about 60 thousand light-years across, and a jet emanating from it is estimated to span about 88 thousand light-years.

A Type Ia supernova event in this galaxy was reported on January 1, 2001. It was designated SN 2001A, marking the first supernova discovery of the year. The position of the event was 3.1″ west and 10.7″ north of the galactic nucleus. It had reached magnitude 18.4 on December 15 of the previous year.

== Gallery ==
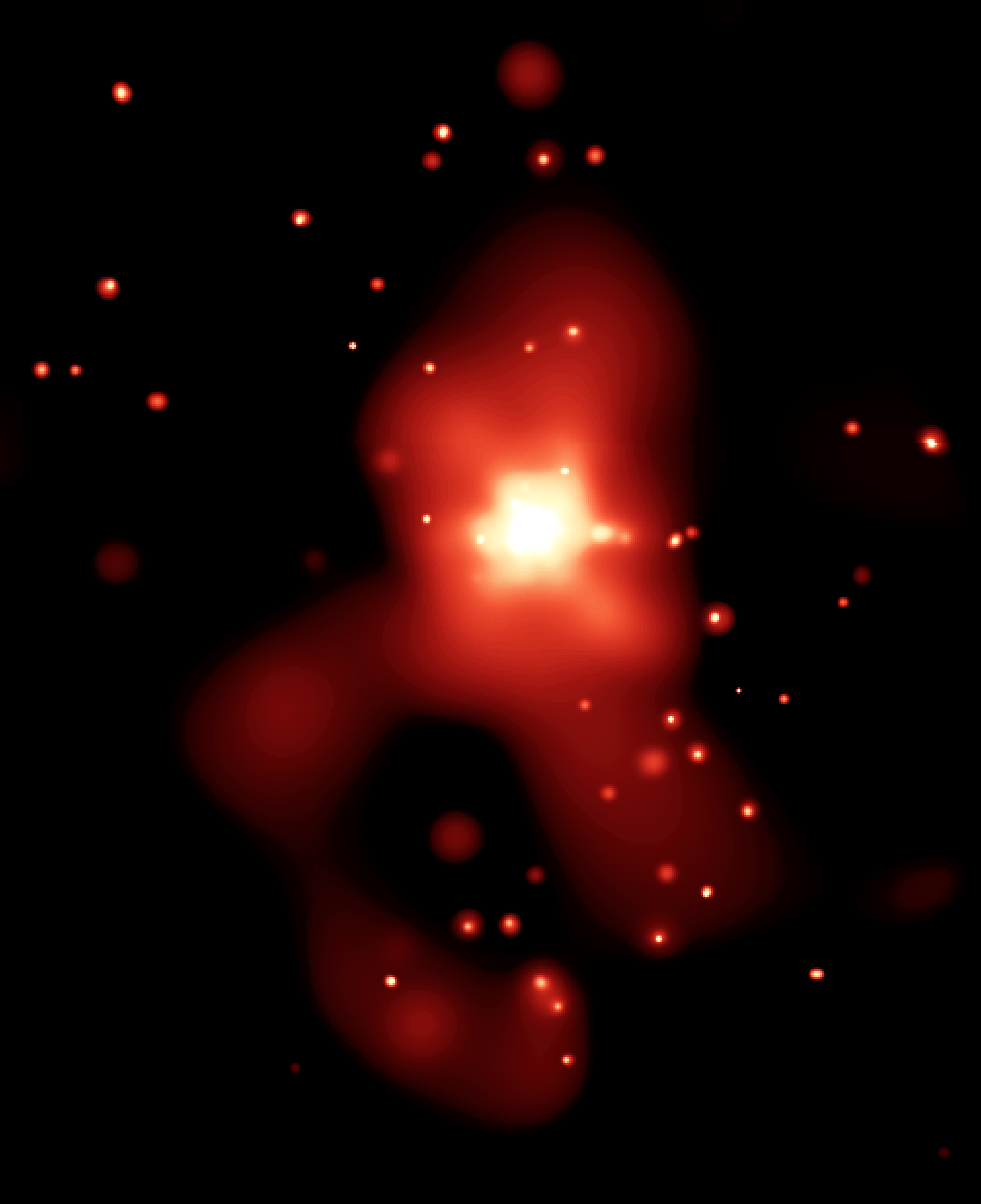
An X-ray image of NGC 4261

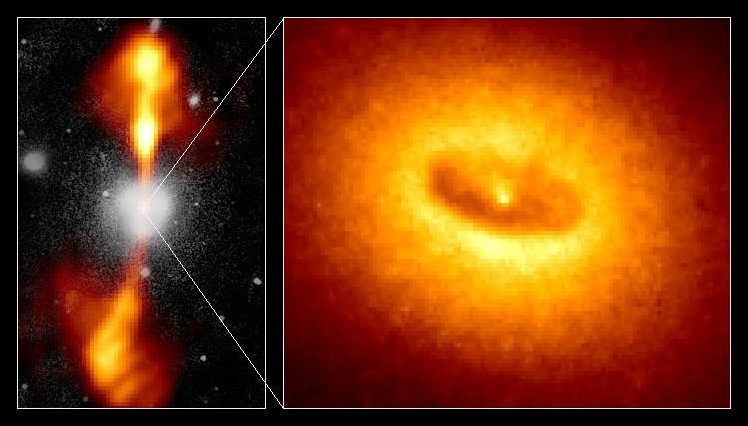
A Hubble Space Telescope (right) image of the gas and dust disk in the active galactic nucleus of NGC 4261. Credit: HST/NASA/ESA.

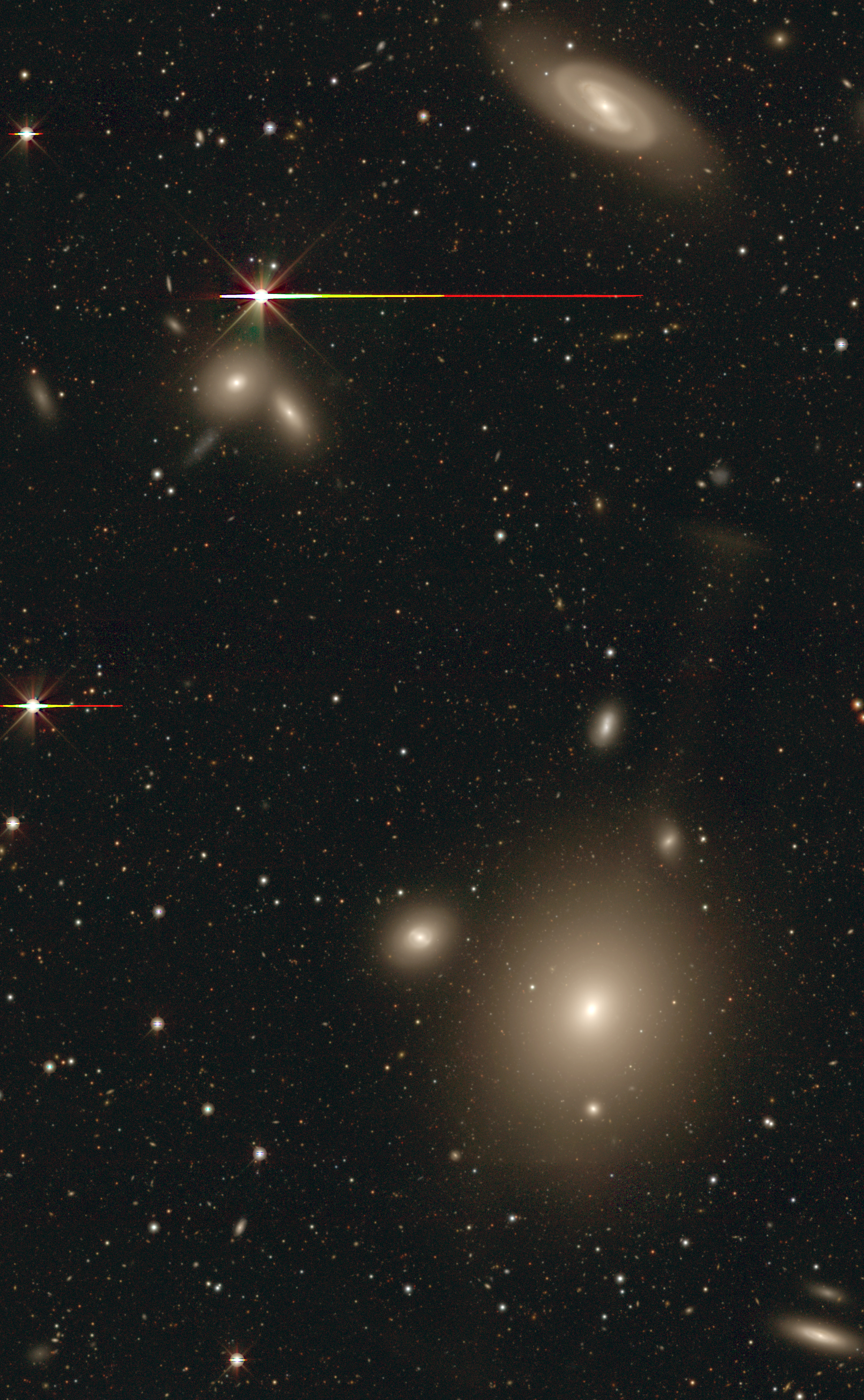
Northern part of the NGC 4261 Group, with NGC 4261 at the bottom and NGC 4260 at the top

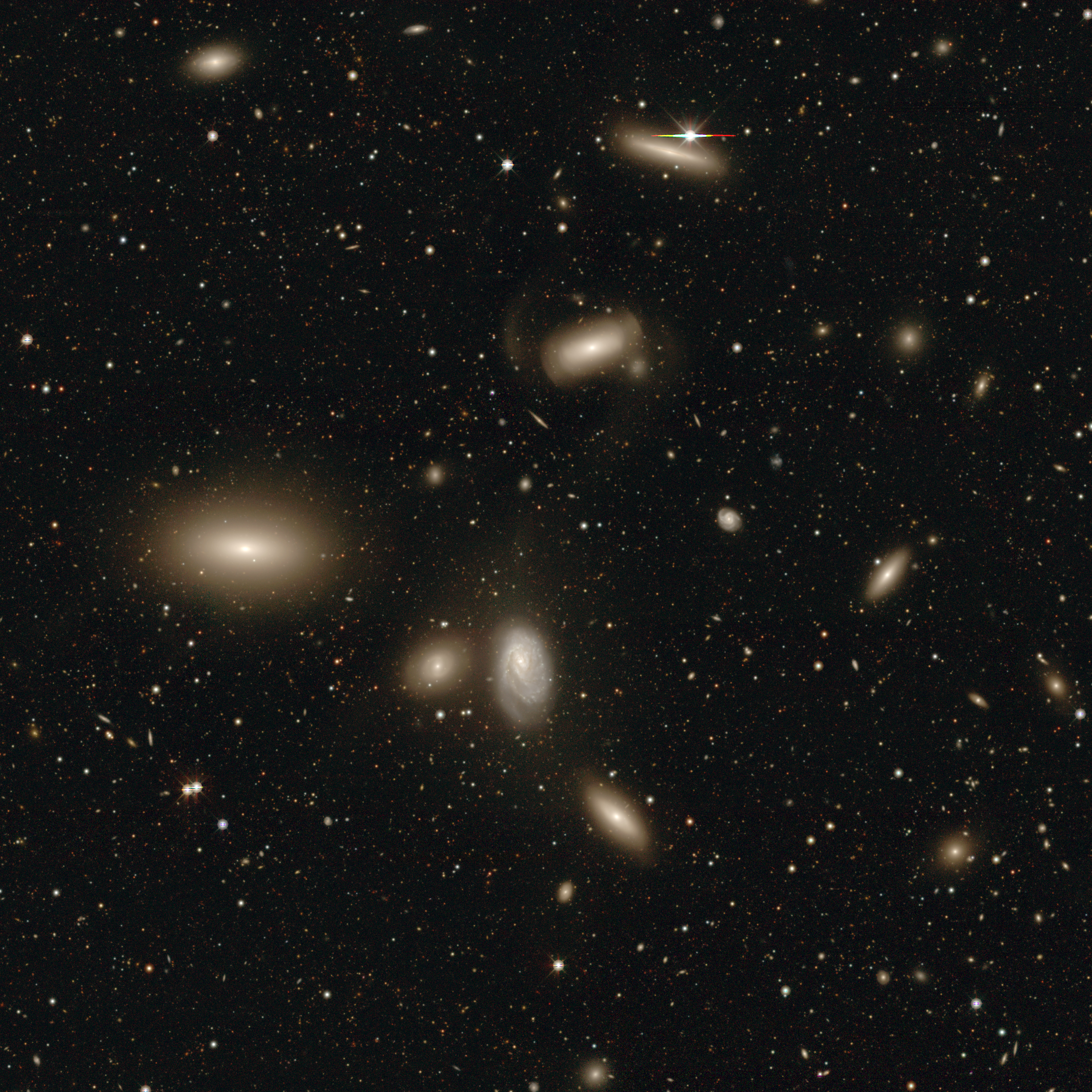
Southern part of the NGC 4261 Group

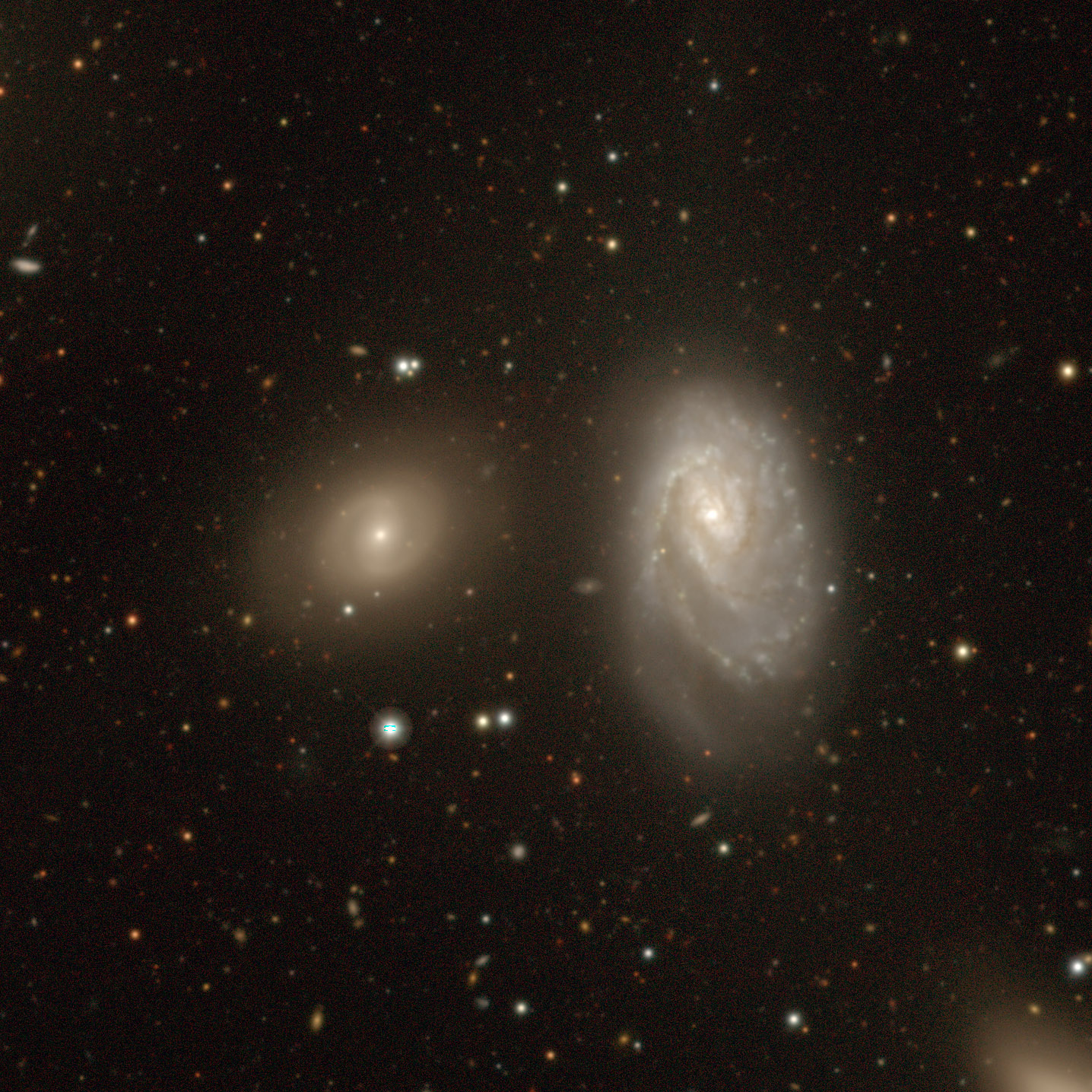
NGC 4273 (spiral galaxy to the right) and NGC 4277, which are part of the NGC 4261 Group

== See also ==
- List of NGC objects (4001–5000)
