= NGC 4365 =

Elliptical galaxy in the constellation Virgo

- NGC 4365 imaged by the Vera C. Rubin Observatory

Observation data (J2000 epoch)
- Constellation: Virgo
- Right ascension: 12^{h} 24^{m} 28.228^{s}
- Declination: +07° 19′ 03.07″
- Redshift: −0.00022±0.00009
- Heliocentric radial velocity: 1,221 km/s
- Distance: 74.4 Mly (22.80 Mpc)
- Apparent magnitude (V): 9.6
- Apparent magnitude (B): 11.5

Characteristics
- Type: E3
- Apparent size (V): 6.5′ × 5.0′

Other designations
- NGC 4365, UGC 7488, MCG +01-32-048, PGC 40375

NGC 4365 is a giant elliptical galaxy located in the constellation of Virgo. It was discovered by German-English astronomer William Herschel on April 13, 1784. The galaxy is located at an estimated distance of 74.4 million light-years (22.80 Mpc) from the Milky Way galaxy.

== Observations ==
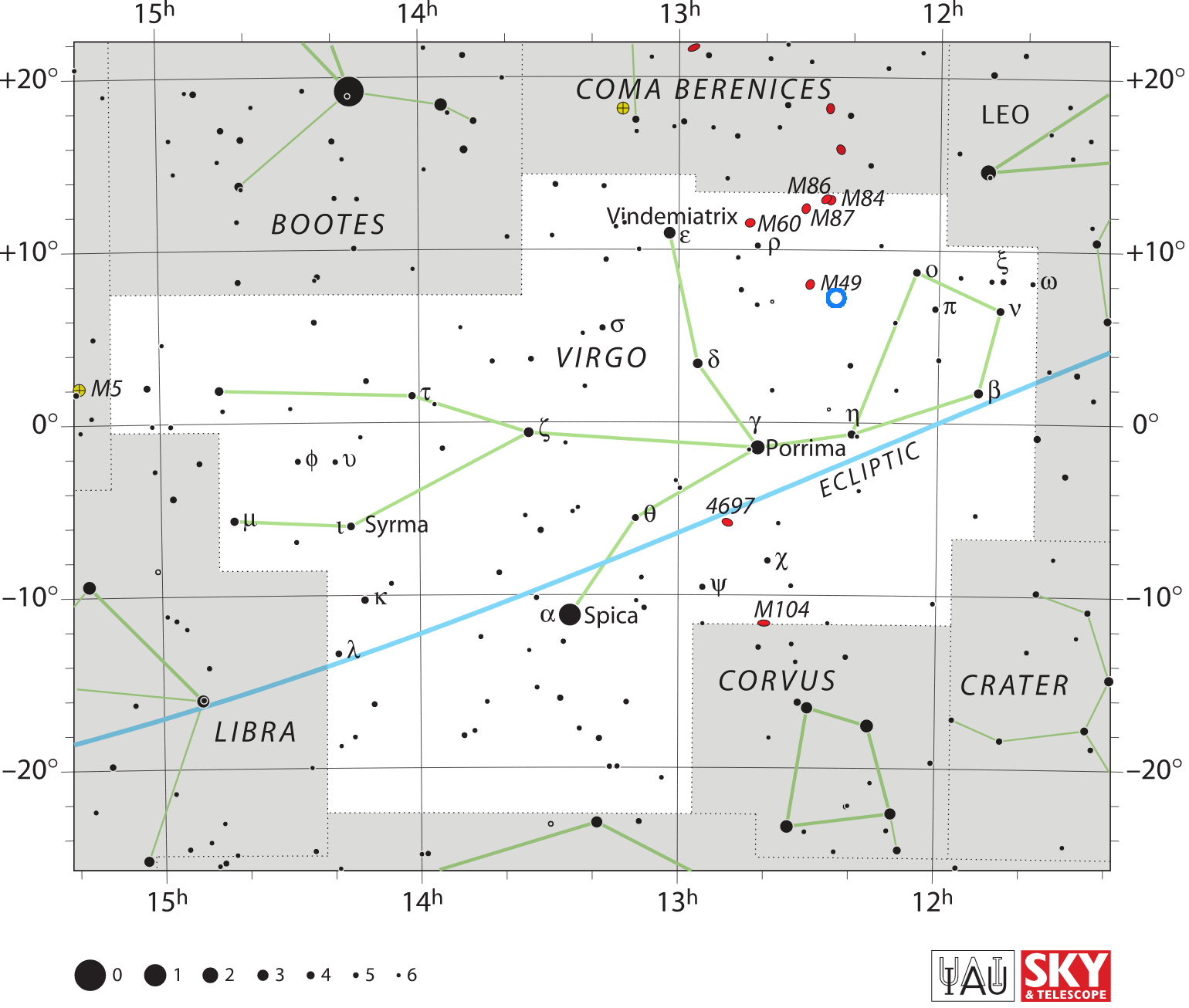
The location of NGC 4365 (circled in blue)

NGC 4365 is the central galaxy of the Virgo W' Cloud, a group of galaxies about 6 megaparsecs behind (further from us than) the Virgo Supercluster. There is a stream of globular clusters connecting NGC 4365 to the neighboring compact lenticular galaxy NGC 4342. It appears that NGC 4365 is stripping globular clusters and stars from its smaller neighbor via tidal interaction.

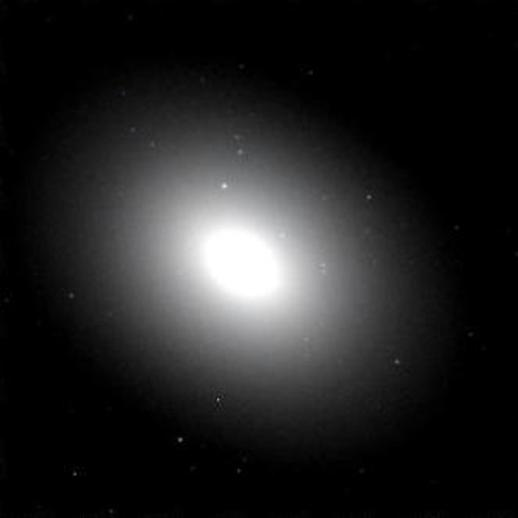
Hubble Space Telescope image of NGC 4365

The morphological classification of NGC 4365 is E3, indicating a slightly flattened elliptical galaxy with an ellipticity of 0.26. It has a smooth luminosity profile with no indication of dust arms. There is a shallow cusp at the center. The galaxy has a kinematically distinct core region that is rotating at right angles to the rest of the galaxy, which provides strong evidence for the theory that elliptical galaxies grow through mergers. Most of the galaxy is rotating around the major axis with the peak velocity reaching around 50 km/s, whereas within 2″–3″ of the center the peak velocity is 80 km/s around the minor axis. This core region is more flattened than the galaxy as a whole, forming a bar-like structure.

The stellar populations of the galaxy suggest it underwent star formation at an early age, with the residual gas being exhausted about 12 billion years ago. In contrast, many of the globular clusters of this galaxy appeared to be of intermediate age of 2–8 billion years old. However, they may instead be of higher than expected metallicity. The galaxy retains a triaxial structure that has remained largely unchanged for 12 billion years. Because supermassive black holes (SMBH) in the centers of galaxies tend to scatter stars into chaotic new orbits, the longevity of NGC 4365's triaxial structure and kinematically distinct stellar populations indicates that it cannot have an SMBH with a mass greater than 3×10^{9} M_{☉}. The M–sigma relation predicts a SMBH mass of 4×10^{8} M_{☉} for NGC 4365.
