= NGC 4260 =

Galaxy in the constellation Virgo

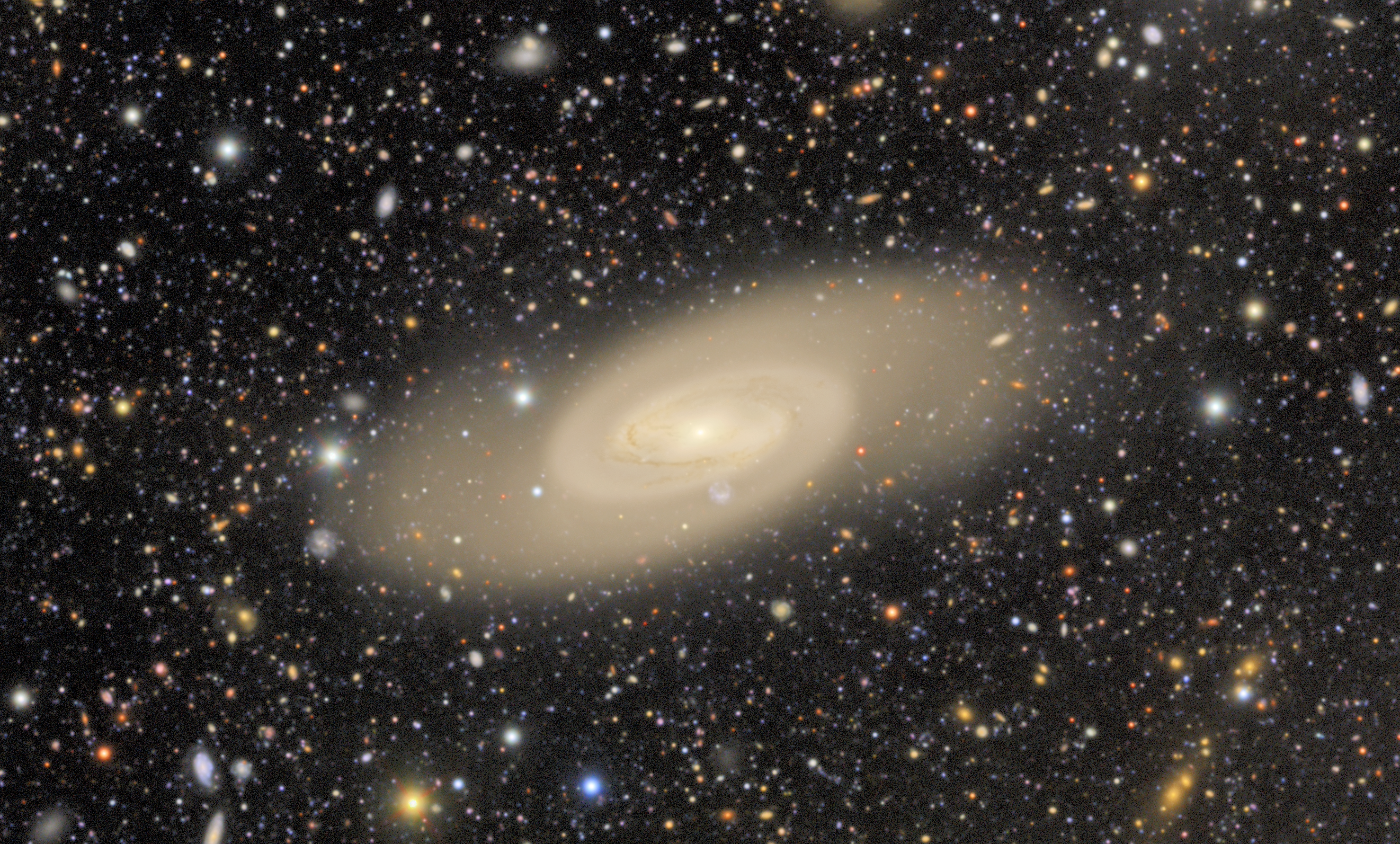
- NGC 4260 imaged by the Vera C. Rubin Observatory

Observation data (J2000 epoch)
- Constellation: Virgo
- Right ascension: 12^{h} 19^{m} 22.2554^{s}
- Declination: +06° 05′ 55.482″
- Redshift: 0.006531
- Heliocentric radial velocity: 1,776±2 km/s
- Distance: 131.33 ± 6.17 Mly (40.267 ± 1.891 Mpc)
- Apparent magnitude (B): 13.1

Characteristics
- Type: SB(s)a
- Size: ~142,600 ly (43.73 kpc) (estimated)
- Apparent size (V): 3.34′ × 1.03′

Other designations
- UGC 7361, MCG +01-31-054, PGC 39656, CGCG 042-015

NGC 4260 is a barred spiral galaxy in the constellation Virgo. Its velocity with respect to the cosmic microwave background is 2,122±24 km/s, which corresponds to a Hubble distance of 102.1 ± 7.2 Mly (31.29 ± 2.22 Mpc). However, six non-redshift measurements give a much farther distance of 131.33 ± 6.17 Mly (40.267 ± 1.891 Mpc). It was discovered by German-British astronomer William Herschel on 13 April 1784.

== Gallery ==
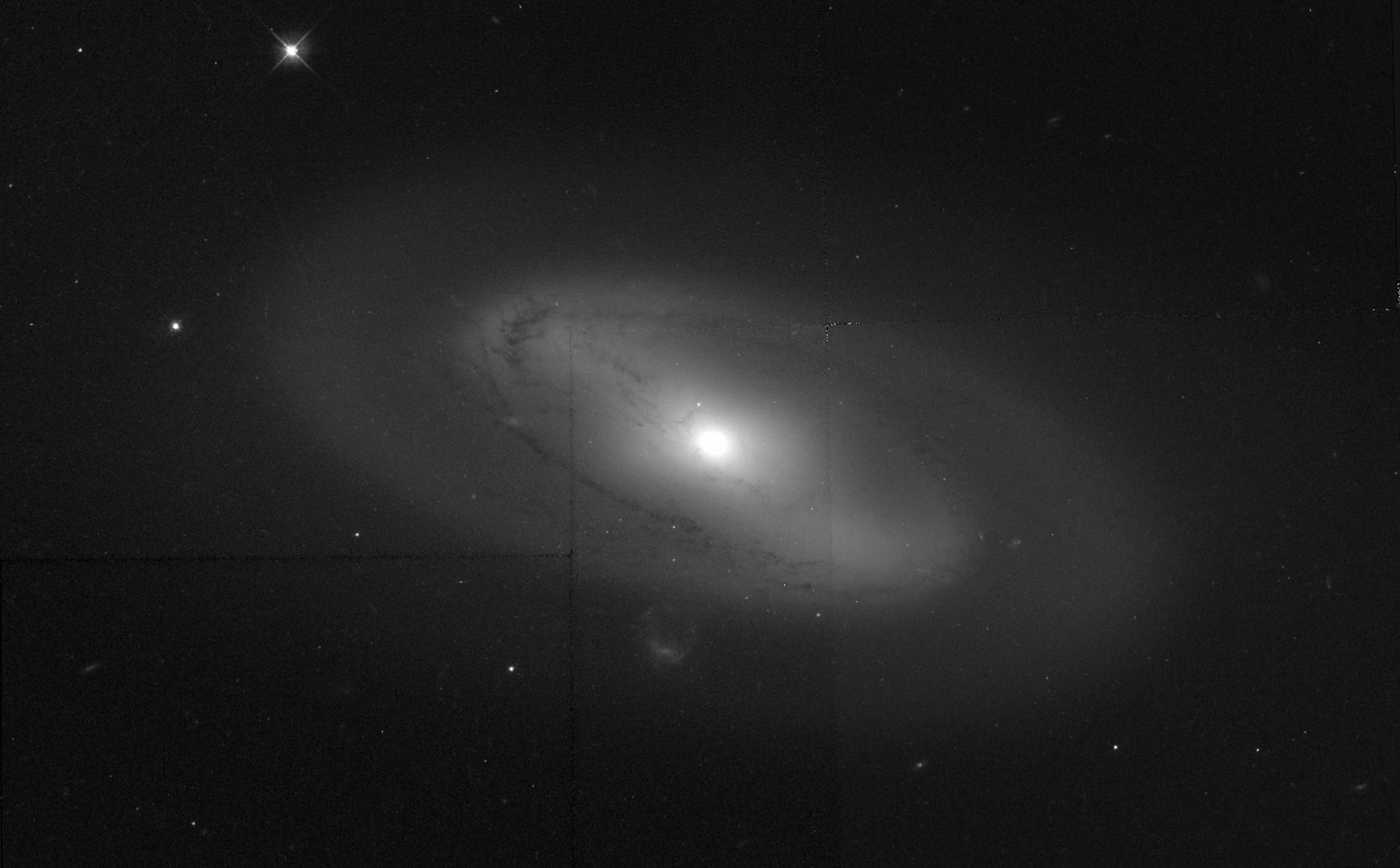
Hubble Space Telescope image of NGC 4260

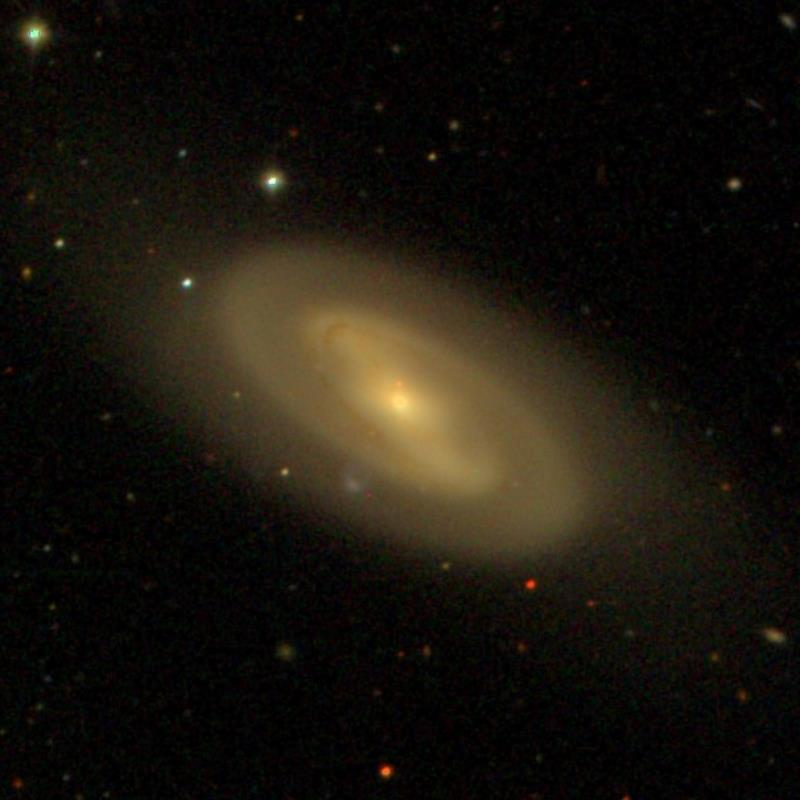
NGC 4260 (SDSS DR14)

== See also ==
- List of NGC objects (4001–5000)
