= NGC 1272 =

Galaxy in the constellation Perseus

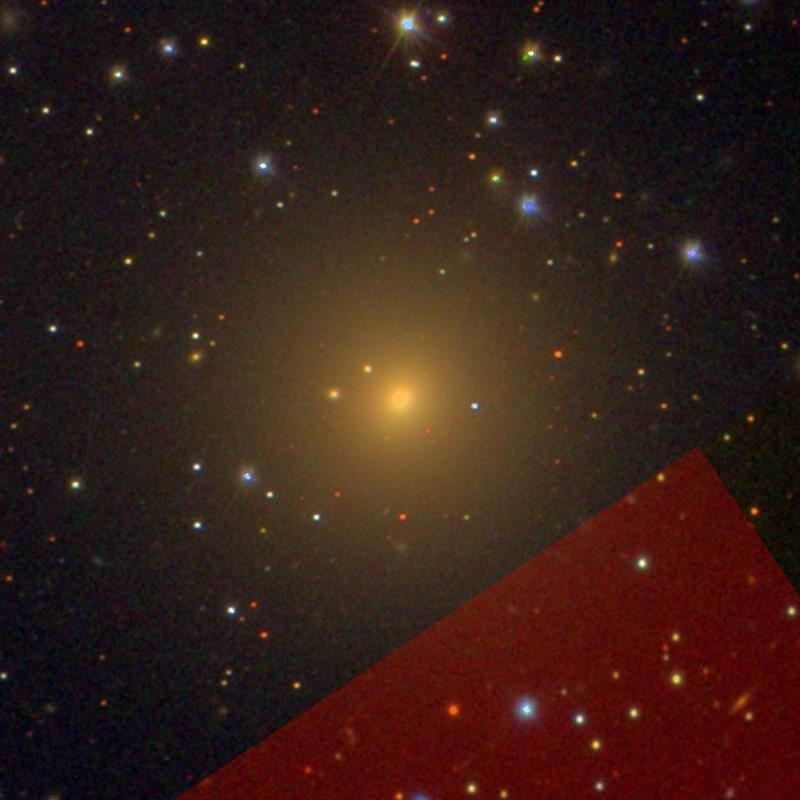
- SDSS image of NGC 1272

Observation data (J2000 epoch)
- Constellation: Perseus
- Right ascension: 03^{h} 19^{m} 21.3^{s}
- Declination: 41° 29′ 26″
- Redshift: 0.012725
- Heliocentric radial velocity: 3815 km/s
- Distance: 226 Mly (69.2 Mpc)
- Group or cluster: Perseus Cluster
- Apparent magnitude (V): 12.86

Characteristics
- Type: cD, E+
- Size: ~200,000 ly (60 kpc) (estimated)
- Apparent size (V): 2.0 x 1.9
- Half-light radius (physical): ~36,000 ly (11 kpc) (estimated)

Other designations
- CGCG 540-98, MCG 7-7-58, PGC 12384, UGC 2662

NGC 1272 is a massive elliptical galaxy located about 230 million light-years away in the constellation Perseus. It was discovered by astronomer Heinrich d'Arrest on February 14, 1863. NGC 1272 has an active nucleus and is the second brightest member of the Perseus Cluster after NGC 1275.

== Radio jets ==
NGC 1272 has two radio jets which are powered by an AGN at the center of the galaxy. The jets are bent and have a radius of curvature of ~6,500 ly (2 kpc). The morphology of the jets indicate that the jets are affected by ram-pressure stripping caused by the motion of NGC 1272 though the ICM of the Perseus Cluster. Due to the proximity of NGC 1272 to the center of the Perseus Cluster, the galaxy experiences ram-pressure on an order of magnitude larger than any other bent-double in the cluster and experiences stronger ram-pressure than other bent-doubles outside of the cluster.

== ISM removal ==
The small bending radius of the jets requires NGC 1272 to have essentially no ISM at radii of ~2 kpc and beyond. The ISM of NGC 1272 may have also been removed though ram-pressure stripping. However, ram-pressure alone cannot remove a fraction of the ISM from deep within the galaxy. Another process, such as AGN feedback in NGC 1272 must have initially removed a large fraction of the ISM before ram-pressure can become effective in removing the ISM.

== Globular clusters ==
It is estimated that around 12,000 globular clusters surround NGC 1272.

== SN 2016arc ==
On February 26, 2016 a Type Ia supernova designated as SN 2016arc was discovered in NGC 1272.

== See also ==
- List of NGC objects (1001–2000)
- NGC 1265
- NGC 1275
- Messier 87
- NGC 4061 - a bent radio double galaxy in the NGC 4065 Group
- NGC 1277
- NGC 1278
- NGC 1273
- NGC 1268
- NGC 1270
