= NGC 4070 =

Galaxy in the constellation Coma Berenices

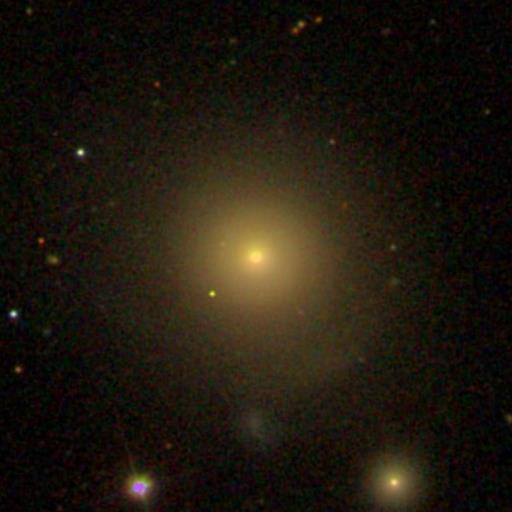
- SDSS image of NGC 4070

Observation data (J2000 epoch)
- Constellation: Coma Berenices
- Right ascension: 12^{h} 04^{m} 11.3^{s}
- Declination: 20° 24′ 35″
- Redshift: 0.024060
- Heliocentric radial velocity: 7213 km/s
- Distance: 340 Mly (103 Mpc)
- Group or cluster: NGC 4065 Group
- Apparent magnitude (V): 14.14

Characteristics
- Type: E
- Size: ~160,000 ly (50 kpc) (estimated)
- Apparent size (V): 1.0 x 1.0

Other designations
- NGC 4059, MCG +04-29-009, UGC 7052, PGC 38169

NGC 4070 is an elliptical galaxy located 340 million light-years away in the constellation Coma Berenices. NGC 4070 was discovered by astronomer William Herschel on April 27, 1785. It was rediscovered by John Herschel on April 29, 1832 and was listed as NGC 4059. The galaxy is a member of the NGC 4065 Group.

NGC 4070 is also classified as a LINER galaxy.

== Physical characteristics ==
Deep images obtained with the CAFOS instrument at the Calar Alto Observatory reveal that NGC 4070 has some deviation from a perfectly spherical or ellipsoidal shape morphology. This indicates that NGC 4070 has undergone a recent interaction, either with the galaxy 2MASX J12040831+2023280 or with a small knot of material. There also appears to be a faint, broad bridge of luminous matter between NGC 4070 and the neighbouring elliptical galaxy NGC 4066. The two galaxies are separated by a projected distance of 370,000 ly (114 kpc).

== Supernova ==
One supernova has been observed in NGC 4070:

- SN 2005bl (Type Ia, mag. 18.8) was discovered by the Lick Observatory Supernova Search (LOSS) on April 14, 2005, and independently by Tim Puckett and A. Langoussis on April 18, 2005.

== See also ==
- List of NGC objects (4001–5000)
