= NGC 4558 =

Galaxy in the constellation Coma Berenices

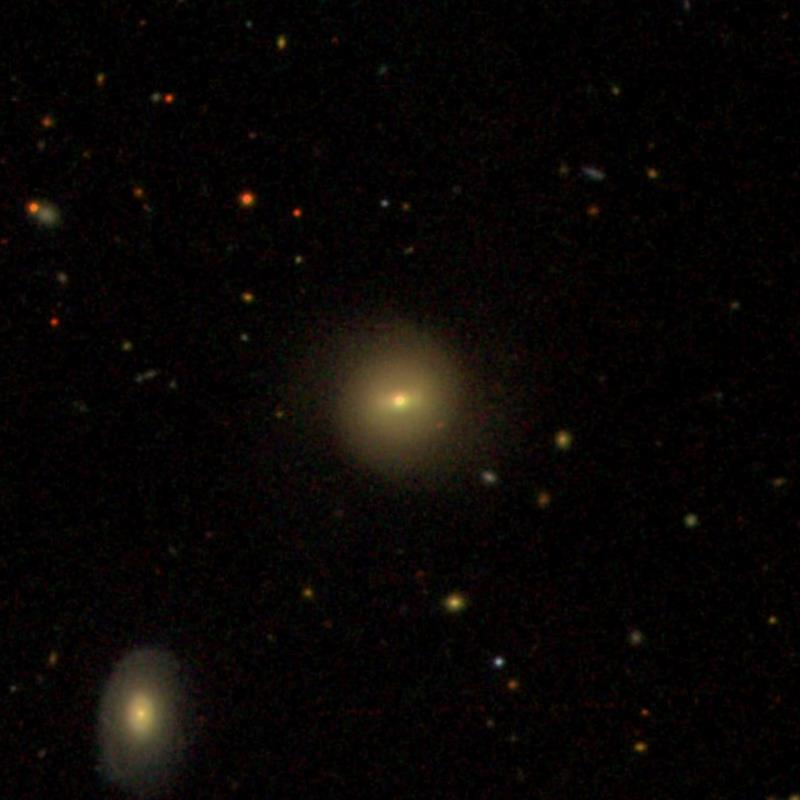
- SDSS image of NGC 4558.

Observation data (J2000 epoch)
- Constellation: Coma Berenices
- Right ascension: 12^{h} 35^{m} 52.6^{s}
- Declination: 26° 59′ 32″
- Redshift: 0.026034
- Heliocentric radial velocity: 7805 km/s
- Distance: 360 Mly (110 Mpc)
- Apparent magnitude (V): 14.7
- Absolute magnitude (B): -22.07

Characteristics
- Type: SB0
- Size: ~125,200 ly (38.40 kpc) (estimated)
- Apparent size (V): 0.82′ × 0.72′

Other designations
- CGCG 159-023, MCG +05-30-028, PGC 041995

NGC 4558 is a barred lenticular galaxy located 360 million light-years away in the constellation Coma Berenices. It was discovered on April 19, 1827, by astronomer John Herschel. NGC 4558 is a member of a group of 12 galaxies known as [T2015] nest 100082, or the NGC 4555 Group, and is part of the Coma Supercluster.

NGC 4558 is host to a supermassive black hole with an estimated mass of 7.3 × 10^{8} M_{☉}.

== See also ==
- Coma Supercluster
