= NGC 4673 =

Galaxy in the constellation Coma Berenices

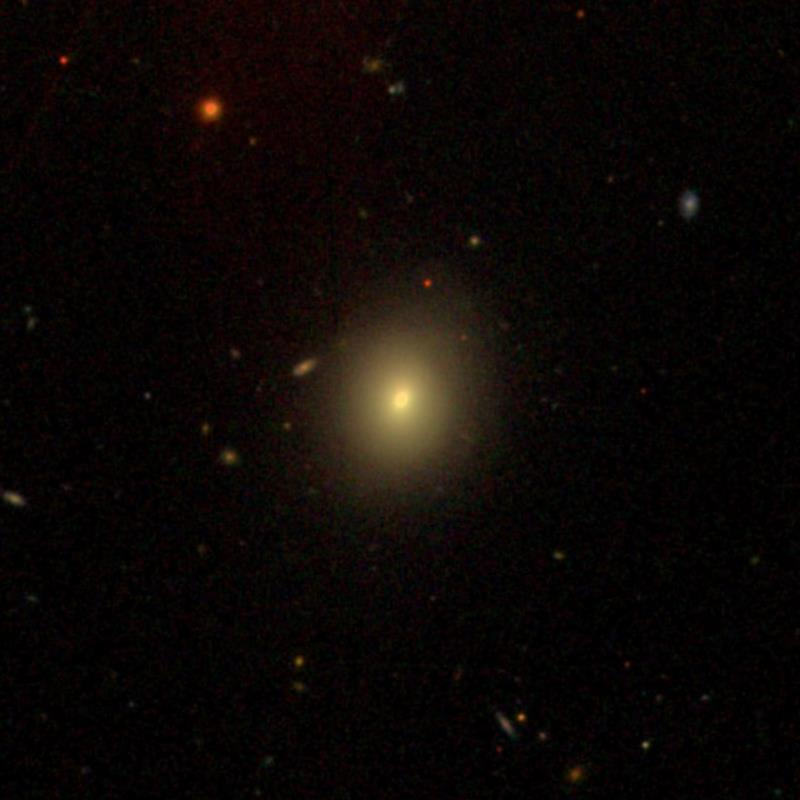
- SDSS image of NGC 4673.

Observation data (J2000 epoch)
- Constellation: Coma Berenices
- Right ascension: 12^{h} 45^{m} 34.7^{s}
- Declination: 27° 03′ 39″
- Redshift: 0.022856
- Heliocentric radial velocity: 6852 km/s
- Distance: 317 Mly (97.2 Mpc)
- Apparent magnitude (V): 13.87
- Absolute magnitude (B): -21.96

Characteristics
- Type: E1-2
- Size: ~75,100 ly (23.04 kpc) (estimated)
- Apparent size (V): 1.0′ × 0.9′

Other designations
- UGC 07933, MRK 0656, CGCG 159-070, MCG +05-30-073, PGC 043008

NGC 4673 is an elliptical galaxy located 317 million light-years away in the constellation Coma Berenices. It was discovered on April 6, 1785, by astronomer William Herschel. NGC 4673 is part of a group of 11 galaxies, known as [T2015] nest 100111, which is also known as the NGC 4692 Group and is part of the Coma Supercluster.

NGC 4673 is host to a supermassive black hole with an estimated mass of 7.2 × 10^{8} M_{☉}, and a population of 750 globular clusters.

== See also ==
- Coma Supercluster
