= NGC 4060 =

Lenticular and LINER galaxy in the constellation Coma Berenices

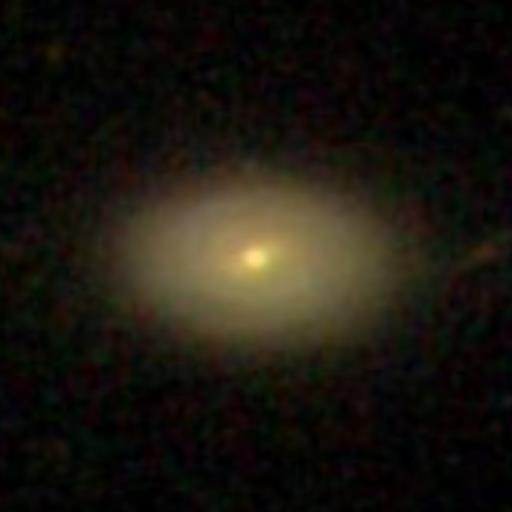
- SDSS image of NGC 4060

Observation data (J2000 epoch)
- Constellation: Coma Berenices
- Right ascension: 12^{h} 04^{m} 01.0^{s}
- Declination: 20° 20′ 15″
- Redshift: 0.022636
- Heliocentric radial velocity: 6786 km/s
- Distance: 320 Mly (97 Mpc)
- Group or cluster: NGC 4065 Group
- Apparent magnitude (V): 15.6

Characteristics
- Type: S0
- Size: ~65,000 ly (20 kpc) (estimated)
- Apparent size (V): 0.40 x 0.30

Other designations
- PGC 38151

NGC 4060 is a lenticular galaxy located 320 million light-years away in the constellation Coma Berenices. It was discovered by astronomer Albert Marth on March 18, 1865 and is a member of the NGC 4065 Group which is part of the Coma Supercluster.

NGC 4060 is classified as a LINER galaxy.

== See also ==
- List of NGC objects (4001–5000)
