= NGC 4556 =

Galaxy in the constellation Coma Berenices

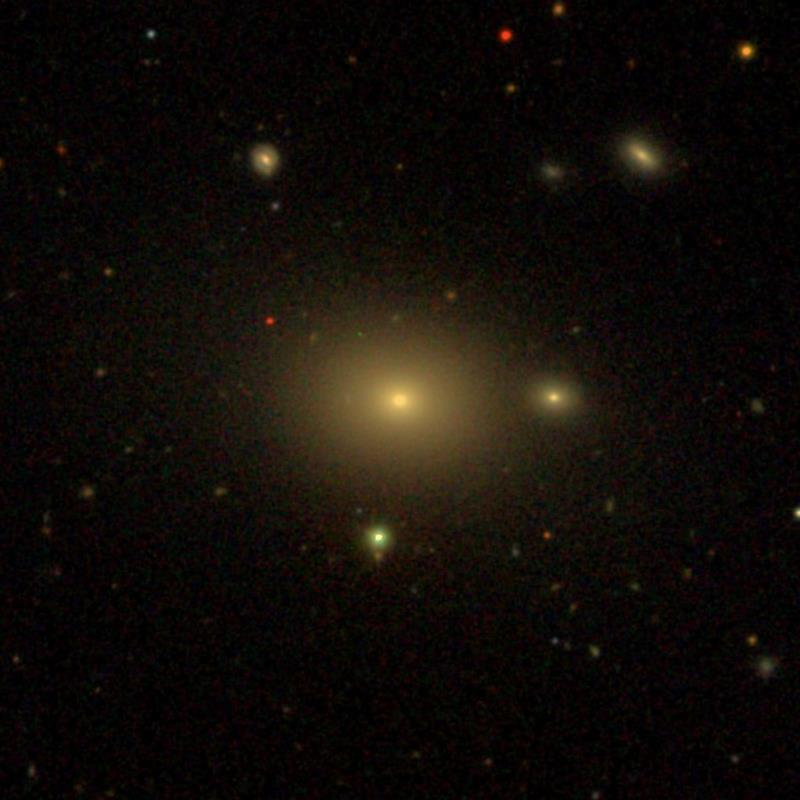
- SDSS image of NGC 4556.

Observation data (J2000 epoch)
- Constellation: Coma Berenices
- Right ascension: 12^{h} 35^{m} 45.8^{s}
- Declination: 26° 54′ 32″
- Redshift: 0.024764
- Heliocentric radial velocity: 7424 km/s
- Distance: 340 Mly (105 Mpc)
- Apparent magnitude (V): 13.8
- Absolute magnitude (B): -22.89

Characteristics
- Type: cD, E+
- Size: ~167,500 ly (51.36 kpc) (estimated)
- Apparent size (V): 1.35′ × 0.93′

Other designations
- UGC 07765, CGCG 159-022, MCG +05-30-027, PGC 041980

NGC 4556 is an elliptical galaxy and a cD galaxy located 340 million light-years away in the constellation Coma Berenices. It was discovered on April 11, 1785, by astronomer William Herschel. NGC 4556 is a member of a group of 12 galaxies known as [T2015] nest 100082, or the NGC 4555 Group, and is part of the Coma Supercluster.

NGC 4556 is host to a supermassive black hole with an estimated mass of 1.1 × 10^{9} M_{☉}.

== See also ==
- Coma Supercluster
