= NGC 4092 =

Galaxy in the constellation Coma Berenices

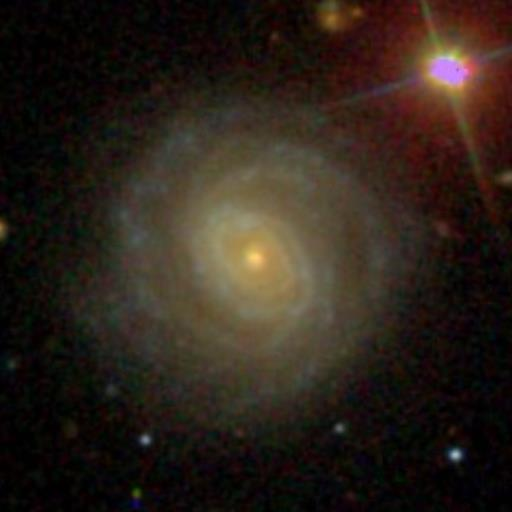
- SDSS image of NGC 4092.

Observation data (J2000 epoch)
- Constellation: Coma Berenices
- Right ascension: 12^{h} 05^{m} 50.1^{s}
- Declination: 20° 28′ 37″
- Redshift: 0.022412
- Heliocentric radial velocity: 6719 km/s
- Distance: 310 Mly (96 Mpc)
- Group or cluster: NGC 4065 Group
- Apparent magnitude (V): 14.19

Characteristics
- Type: Sa
- Size: ~100,000 ly (32 kpc) (estimated)
- Apparent size (V): 1.0 x 1.0

Other designations
- UGC 07087, PGC 038338, MCG +04-29-020

NGC 4092 is a spiral galaxy located 310 million light-years away in the constellation Coma Berenices. It was discovered by astronomer Heinrich d'Arrest on May 2, 1864. NGC 4092 is a member of the NGC 4065 Group and hosts an AGN.

== See also ==
- List of NGC objects (4001–5000)
