= NGC 3971 =

Lenticular galaxy in the constellation of Ursa Major

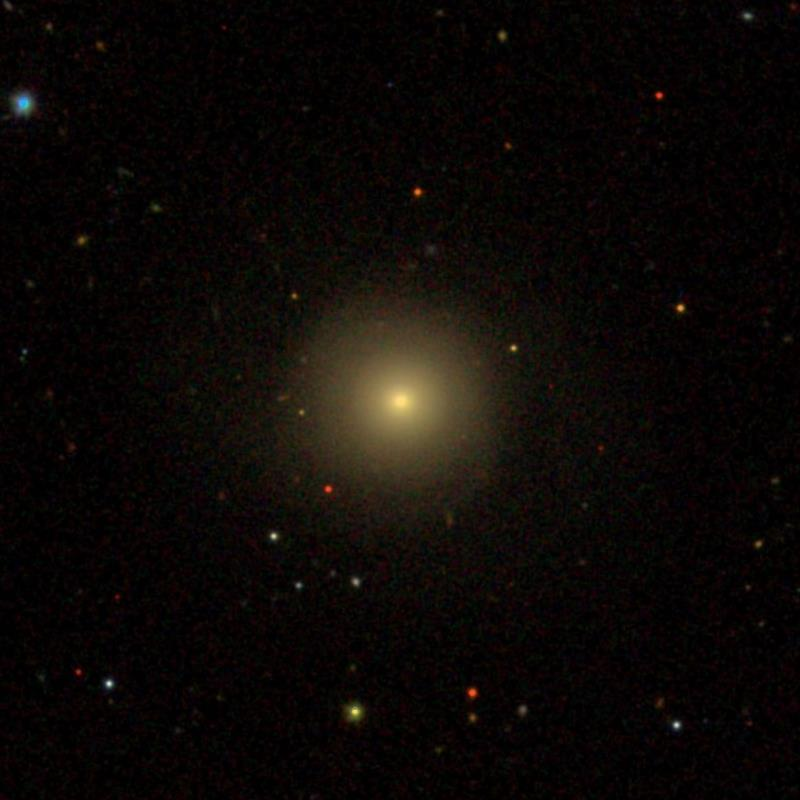
- SDSS image of NGC 3971.

Observation data (J2000 epoch)
- Constellation: Ursa Major
- Right ascension: 11^{h} 55^{m} 36.4^{s}
- Declination: 29° 59′ 45″
- Redshift: 0.022676
- Heliocentric radial velocity: 6798 km/s
- Distance: 315 Mly (96.6 Mpc)
- Apparent magnitude (V): 13.7
- Absolute magnitude (B): -22.06

Characteristics
- Type: S0
- Size: ~97,400 ly (29.85 kpc) (estimated)
- Apparent size (V): 1.06′ × 0.99′

Other designations
- NGC 3984, UGC 06899, CGCG 157-054, PGC 037443, MCG +05-28-047

NGC 3971 is a lenticular galaxy located 315 million light-years away in the constellation Ursa Major. It was discovered on February 3, 1788, by astronomer William Herschel. It was then rediscovered by his son John Herschel on April 10, 1831 and given the duplicate designation NGC 3984. NGC 3971 forms a pair with the galaxy UGC 6905 known as [T2015] nest 103168, and is part of the Coma Supercluster.

NGC 3971 is a LINER galaxy, and is host to a supermassive black hole with an estimated mass of 9.6 × 10^{8} M_{☉}.

== See also ==
- Coma Supercluster
