= NGC 4213 =

Galaxy in the constellation Coma Berenices

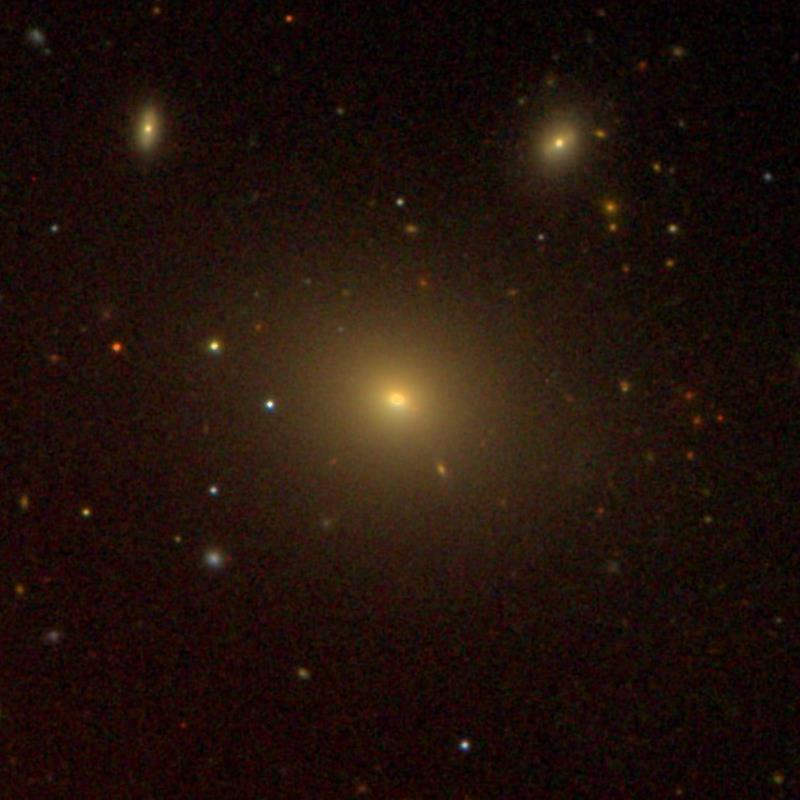
- SDSS image of NGC 4213

Observation data (J2000 epoch)
- Constellation: Coma Berenices
- Right ascension: 12^{h} 15^{m} 37.5^{s}
- Declination: 23° 58′ 55″
- Redshift: 0.022349
- Heliocentric radial velocity: 6700 km/s
- Distance: 344 Mly (105.5 Mpc)
- Group or cluster: NGC 4213 Group
- Apparent magnitude (V): 13.48
- Absolute magnitude (B): -22.94

Characteristics
- Type: E
- Size: ~195,700 ly (60.00 kpc) (estimated)
- Apparent size (V): 1.7′ × 1.7′

Other designations
- UGC 07276, CGCG 128-065, MCG +04-29-054, PGC 039223

NGC 4213 is an elliptical galaxy located 344 million light-years away in the constellation Coma Berenices. It was discovered on April 10, 1785, by astronomer William Herschel. NGC 4213 is a member of the NGC 4213 Group, which is part of the Coma Supercluster. Other members of the group are IC 772, IC 3075, IC 3089, 2MASX J12140497+2404021, and 2MFGC 9641.

NGC 4213 has a supermassive black hole with an estimated mass of 9.7 × 10^{8} M_{☉}.

== See also ==
- Coma Supercluster
