= NGC 4585 =

Galaxy in the constellation Coma Berenices

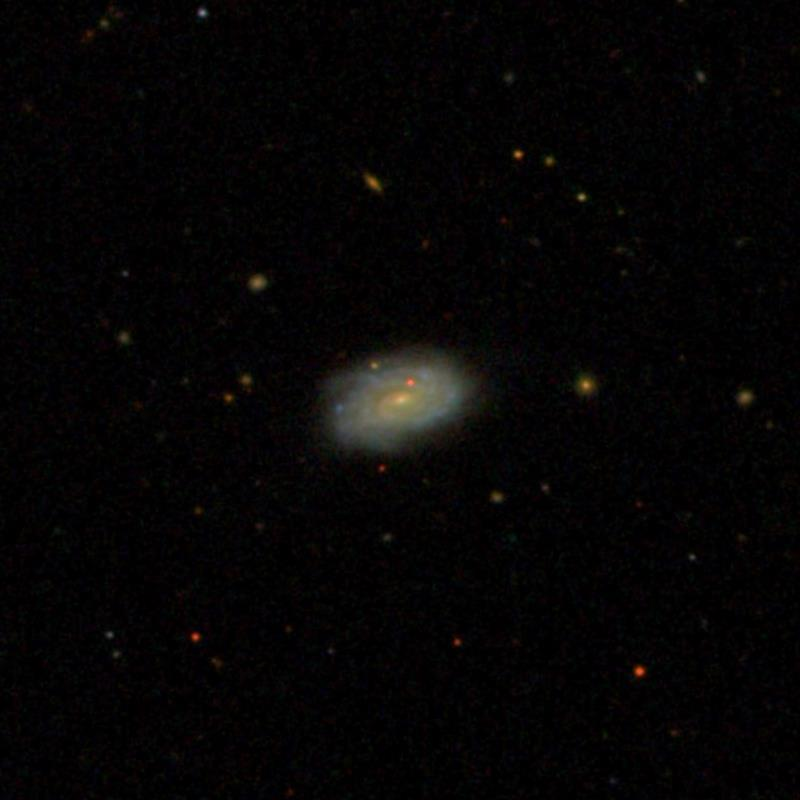
- SDSS image of NGC 4585.

Observation data (J2000 epoch)
- Constellation: Coma Berenices
- Right ascension: 12^{h} 38^{m} 13.2^{s}
- Declination: 28° 56′ 14″
- Redshift: 0.024367
- Heliocentric radial velocity: 7305 km/s
- Distance: 340 Mly (103 Mpc)
- Apparent magnitude (V): 14.6
- Absolute magnitude (B): -22.37

Characteristics
- Type: Sab
- Size: ~110,300 ly (33.81 kpc) (estimated)
- Apparent size (V): 0.89′ × 0.50′

Other designations
- CGCG 159-037, MCG +05-30-042, PGC 042215

NGC 4585 is a spiral galaxy located 340 million light-years away in the constellation Coma Berenices. It was discovered on April 21, 1865, by astronomer Heinrich d'Arrest. NGC 4585 forms a pair with the galaxy 2MASX J12391856+2854154, known as [T2015] nest 102105, and is part of the Coma Supercluster.

NGC 4585 is host to a supermassive black hole with an estimated mass of 8.5 × 10^{7} M_{☉}.

== See also ==
- Coma Supercluster
