= NGC 4098 =

Interacting galaxies in the constellation Coma Berenices

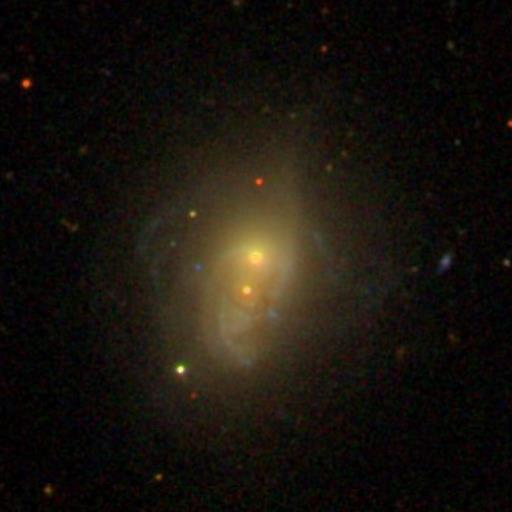
- SDSS image of NGC 4098.

Observation data (J2000 epoch)
- Constellation: Coma Berenices
- Right ascension: 12^{h} 06^{m} 03.9^{s}
- Declination: 20° 36′ 22″
- Redshift: 0.024337
- Heliocentric radial velocity: 7296 km/s
- Distance: 330 Mly (101 Mpc)
- Group or cluster: NGC 4065 Group
- Apparent magnitude (V): 14.5

Characteristics
- Type: S?
- Size: ~105,000 ly (32.3 kpc) (estimated)
- Apparent size (V): 0.8 x 0.4

Other designations
- NGC 4099, UGC 07091, PGC 038365, MCG +04-29-023, VV 061

NGC 4098 is an interacting pair of spiral galaxies located 330 million light-years away in the constellation Coma Berenices. NGC 4098 was discovered by astronomer William Herschel on April 26, 1785. It was then rediscovered by Hershel on December 27, 1786 was listed as NGC 4099. NGC 4098 is a member of the NGC 4065 Group.

NGC 4098 is interacting with the galaxy pair VV 62.

A candidate supernova of an unknown type, which was designated as SNhunt287 (PSN J12060084+2036183), was discovered in NGC 4098 on April 25, 2015.
