= NGC 4061 =

Galaxy in the constellation Coma Berenices

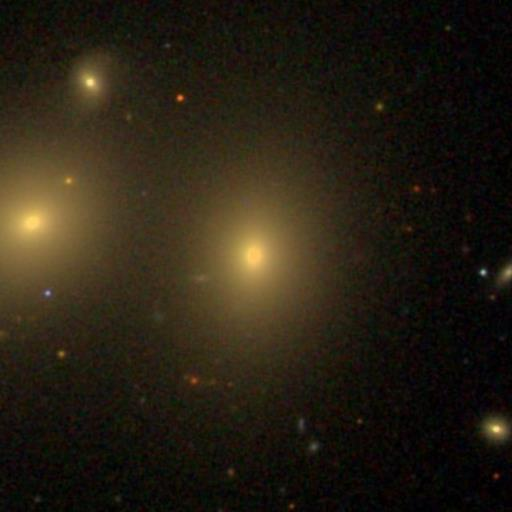
- SDSS image of NGC 4061. NGC 4065 can be seen to the left of the image.

Observation data (J2000 epoch)
- Constellation: Coma Berenices
- Right ascension: 12^{h} 04^{m} 01.5^{s}
- Declination: 20° 13′ 56″
- Redshift: 0.024027
- Heliocentric radial velocity: 7203 km/s
- Distance: 310 Mly (94 Mpc)
- Group or cluster: NGC 4065 Group
- Apparent magnitude (V): 14.12

Characteristics
- Type: E
- Size: ~120,000 ly (37 kpc) (estimated)
- Apparent size (V): 1.2 x 0.9

Other designations
- NGC 4055, MCG +04-29-006, PGC 038146, UGC 07044, VV 179b

NGC 4061 is an elliptical galaxy located 310 million light-years away in the constellation Coma Berenices. It was discovered by astronomer William Herschel on April 27, 1785. It was rediscovered by John Herschel on April 29, 1832. It is listed both as NGC 4061 and NGC 4055. NGC 4061 is a member of the NGC 4065 Group and forms an interacting pair with its companion, NGC 4065 as evidenced by distortions in their optical isophotes.

NGC 4061 is classified as a radio galaxy with a Fanaroff and Riley classification of type I.

== Radio Jets ==
NGC 4061 has two radio jets that appear to be very straight and that dramatically oppose each other. At a distance of 26,000 ly (8 kpc) from the core the jets appear to suddenly sweep back. This sudden bending of the jets suggest that they are leaving the interstellar medium (ISM) of NGC 4061 and entering into the intracluster medium (ICM). After the sharp bending, the jets continue to open for about 82,000 ly (25 kpc) and extend into a "U" or horseshoe morphology similar to NGC 1265, with each jet having a length of 160,000 ly (50 kpc). This morphology is thought to be due to the motion of NGC 4061 through the ICM with sufficient velocity to bend the jets by ram-pressure stripping.

The interaction with NGC 4065 may have also contributed to bending the jets.

== Dust Disk ==
NGC 4061 has a dust disk with a diameter of 7,420 ly (2.275 kpc).

== Supermassive black hole ==
NGC 4061 has a supermassive black hole with a mass in the range of 1-9 billion M☉.

== SN 2008bf ==
On February 18, 2008 a Type Ia supernova designated as SN 2008bf was discovered near NGC 4061. However, the host galaxy may instead be the nearby NGC 4065.

== See also ==
- List of NGC objects (4001–5000)
- NGC 1272

== Notes ==
1.This was determined by multiplying the given scale length in the paper of 0.55 arcseconds=820 ly (250 pc) by 9.1 to get the diameter of the dust disk.
