= NGC 4074 =

Galaxy in the constellation Coma Berenices

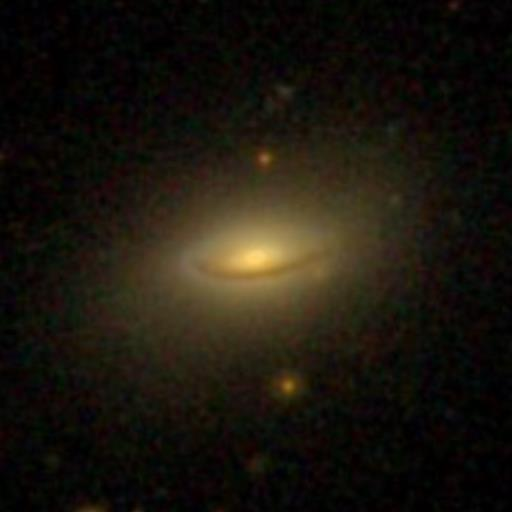
- SDSS image of NGC 4074.

Observation data (J2000 epoch)
- Constellation: Coma Berenices
- Right ascension: 12^{h} 04^{m} 29.7^{s}
- Declination: 20° 18′ 58″
- Redshift: 0.022445
- Heliocentric radial velocity: 6729 km/s
- Distance: 310 Mly (96 Mpc)
- Group or cluster: NGC 4065 Group
- Apparent magnitude (V): 14.5

Characteristics
- Type: S0 pec
- Size: ~100,000 ly (32 kpc) (estimated)
- Apparent size (V): 0.35 x 0.2

Other designations
- ARK 347, MCG +04-29-011, PGC 038207

NGC 4074 is a peculiar lenticular galaxy located 310 million light-years away in the constellation Coma Berenices. It was discovered by astronomer William Herschel on April 27, 1785 and is a member of the NGC 4065 Group.

NGC 4074 is classified as a type 2 Seyfert galaxy. It was first identified as a Seyfert in 1978.

== Supermassive black hole ==
NGC 4074 has a supermassive black hole with an estimated mass of (10×10^{8} M☉).

== See also ==
- List of NGC objects (4001–5000)
