= NGC 4072 =

Galaxy in the constellation Coma Berenices

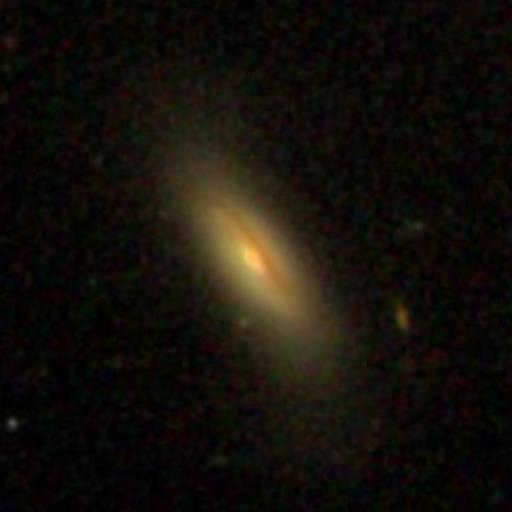
- SDSS image of NGC 4072

Observation data (J2000 epoch)
- Constellation: Coma Berenices
- Right ascension: 12^{h} 04^{m} 13.8^{s}
- Declination: 20° 12′ 35″
- Redshift: 0.021752
- Heliocentric radial velocity: 6521 km/s
- Distance: 304 Mly (93.3 Mpc)
- Group or cluster: NGC 4065 Group
- Apparent magnitude (V): 15.6

Characteristics
- Type: S0
- Size: ~59,000 ly (18 kpc) (estimated)
- Apparent size (V): 0.5 x 0.2

Other designations
- PGC 038176

NGC 4072 is a lenticular galaxy located 300 million light-years away in the constellation Coma Berenices. The galaxy was discovered by astronomer Ralph Copeland on April 3, 1872 and is a member of the NGC 4065 Group.

NGC 4072 is classified as a LINER galaxy.

== See also ==
- List of NGC objects (4001–5000)
