= NGC 3925 =

Galaxy in the constellation Leo

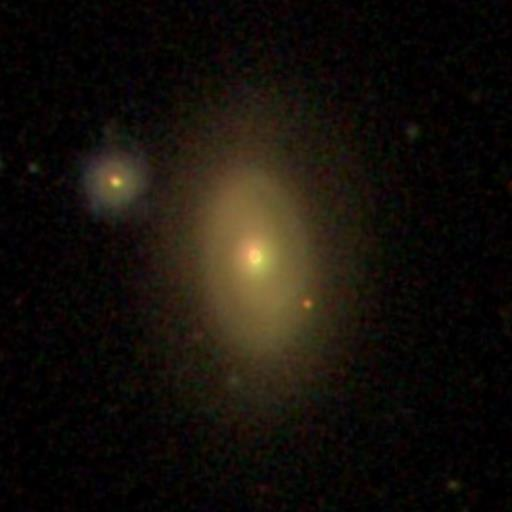
- SDSS image of NGC 3925.

Observation data (J2000 epoch)
- Constellation: Leo
- Right ascension: 11^{h} 51^{m} 20.9^{s}
- Declination: 21° 53′ 21″
- Redshift: 0.026482
- Heliocentric radial velocity: 7939 km/s
- Distance: 370 Mly (113 Mpc)
- Apparent magnitude (V): 15.3

Characteristics
- Type: SAB0/a
- Size: ~128,000 ly (39.3 kpc) (estimated)
- Apparent size (V): 0.65 x 0.45

Other designations
- PGC 037078, MCG +04-28-071

NGC 3925 is a barred lenticular galaxy and a ring galaxy located about 370 million light-years away in the constellation Leo. It was discovered by astronomer Heinrich d'Arrest on February 19, 1863.

NGC 3925 is classified as a "PAS galaxy" because it contains mostly old stars, with no observable star formation activity. NGC 3925 is also a member of the Coma Supercluster.

== See also ==
- List of NGC objects (3001–4000)
- Coma Supercluster
