= NGC 4211 =

Pair of galaxies in the constellation Coma Berenices

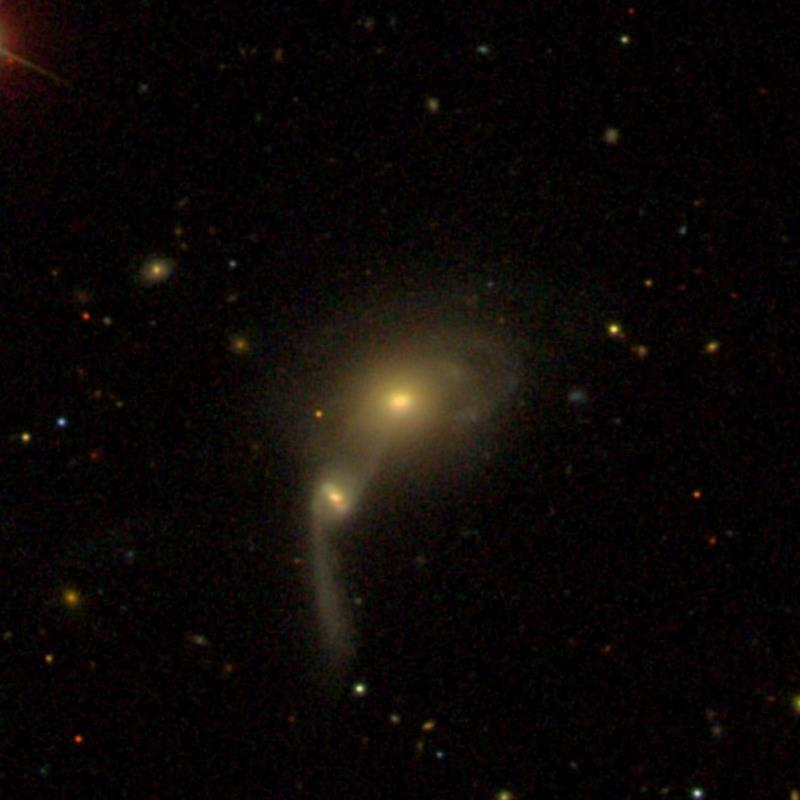
- SDSS image of NGC 4211.

Observation data (J2000 epoch)
- Constellation: Coma Berenices
- Right ascension: 12^{h} 15^{m} 35.8^{s}
- Declination: 28° 10′ 38″
- Redshift: 0.021992
- Heliocentric radial velocity: 6593 km/s
- Distance: 306 Mly (93.9 Mpc)
- Apparent magnitude (V): 14.4
- Absolute magnitude (B): -20.71

Characteristics
- Type: S0/a pec
- Size: ~185,500 ly (56.88 kpc) (estimated)
- Apparent size (V): 2.0′ × 1.0′

Other designations
- UGC 07277, ARP 106, VV 199, CGCG 158-0531

NGC 4211 is a pair of interacting lenticular galaxies located 300 million light-years away in the constellation Coma Berenices. It was discovered on April 30, 1881, by astronomer Édouard Stephan. NGC 4211 is a field galaxy and is part of the Coma Supercluster.

NGC 4211 is a LINER galaxy, and is host to a supermassive black hole with an estimated mass of 8.3 × 10^{8} M_{☉}.

== See also ==
- Coma Supercluster
