= NGC 4084 =

Galaxy in the constellation Coma Berenices

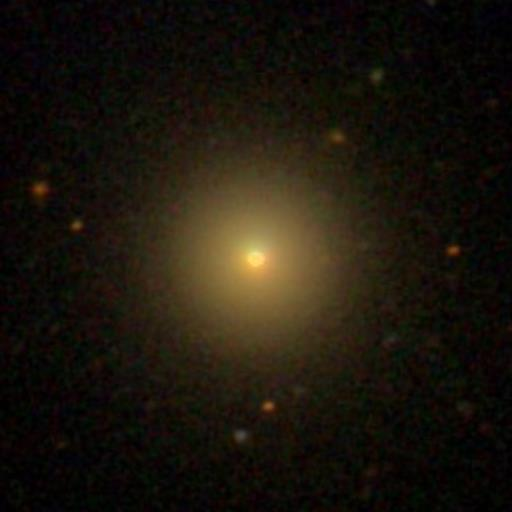
- SDSS image of NGC 4084.

Observation data (J2000 epoch)
- Constellation: Coma Berenices
- Right ascension: 12^{h} 05^{m} 15.2^{s}
- Declination: 21° 12′ 52″
- Redshift: 0.022576
- Heliocentric radial velocity: 6768 km/s
- Distance: 315 Mly (96.6 Mpc)
- Apparent magnitude (V): 15.40

Characteristics
- Type: E
- Size: ~112,100 ly (34.37 kpc) (estimated)
- Apparent size (V): 0.4 x 0.4

Other designations
- PGC 038272, MCG +04-29-014

NGC 4084 is an elliptical galaxy located 315 million light-years away in the constellation Coma Berenices. NGC 4084 was discovered by astronomer Heinrich d'Arrest on April 26, 1865. NGC 4084 is an isolated member of the Coma Supercluster and is classified as a LINER galaxy.

== See also ==
- List of NGC objects (4001–5000)
