= NGC 3951 =

Galaxy in the constellation Leo

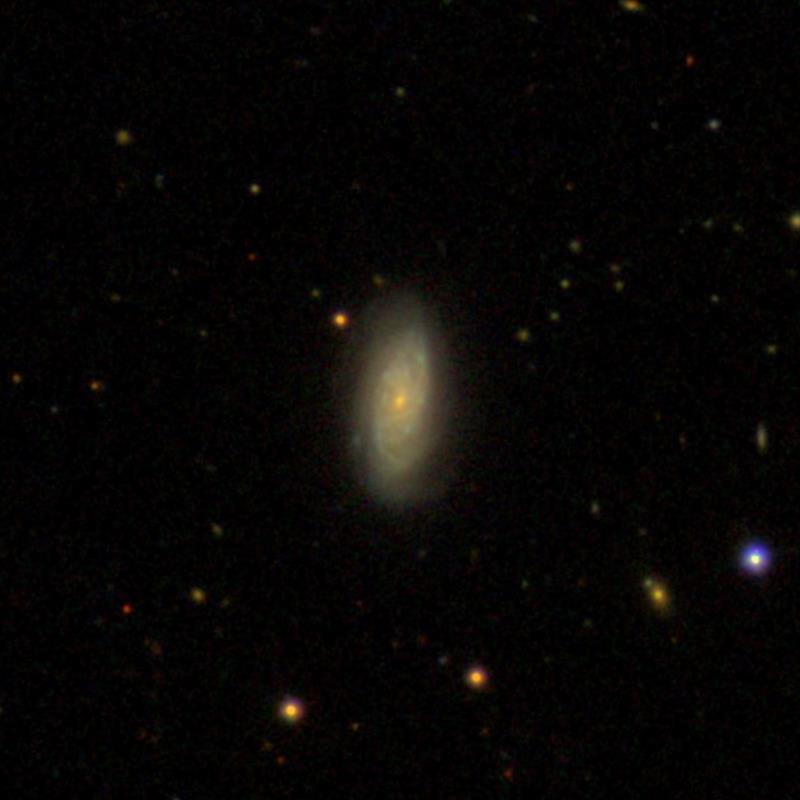
- SDSS image of NGC 3951.

Observation data (J2000 epoch)
- Constellation: Leo
- Right ascension: 11^{h} 53^{m} 41.2^{s}
- Declination: 23° 22′ 56″
- Redshift: 0.021535
- Heliocentric radial velocity: 6456 km/s
- Distance: 301 Mly (92.3 Mpc)
- Apparent magnitude (V): 14.0
- Absolute magnitude (B): -22.62

Characteristics
- Type: Sa
- Size: ~112,000 ly (34.33 kpc) (estimated)
- Apparent size (V): 1.16′ × 0.62′

Other designations
- UGC 06867, CGCG 127-099, MCG +04-28-090, PGC 037288

NGC 3951 is a spiral galaxy located 300 million light-years away in the constellation Leo. It was discovered on April 10, 1785, by astronomer William Herschel. NGC 3951 is a member of a group of 5 galaxies known as [T2015] nest 100412 or the UGC 6846 Group, which is part of the Coma Supercluster. Other members of the group are UGC 6846, UGC 6855, IC 739, and 2MASX J11543515+2352505.

NGC 3951 is a LINER galaxy, host to a supermassive black hole with an estimated mass of 1 × 10^{8} M_{☉}.

== See also ==
- Coma Supercluster
