= NGC 4146 =

Galaxy in the constellation Coma Berenices

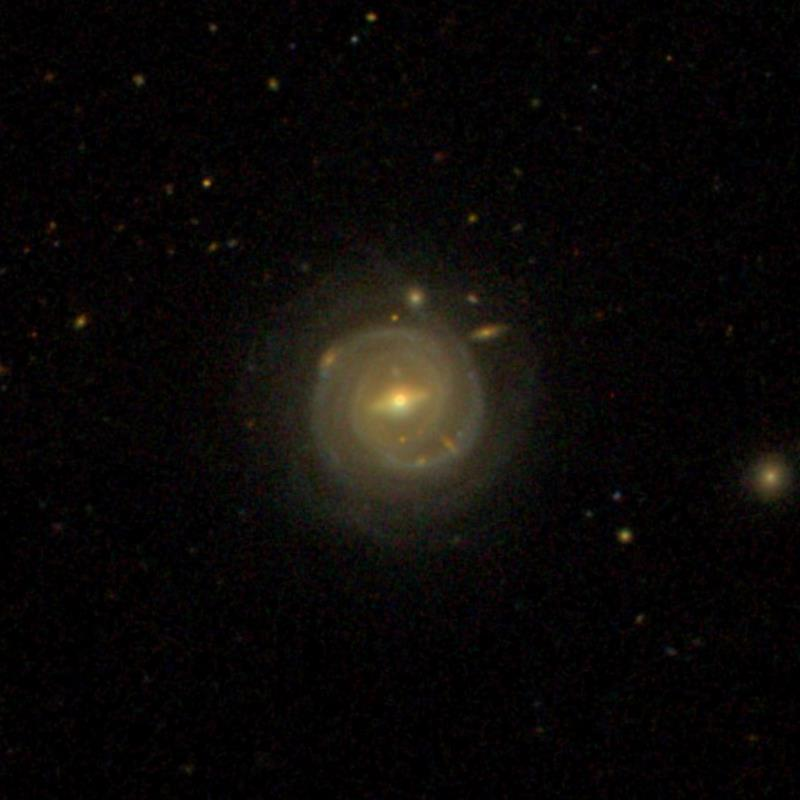
- NGC 4146 imaged by SDSS

Observation data (J2000 epoch)
- Constellation: Coma Berenices
- Right ascension: 12^{h} 10^{m} 18.4^{s}
- Declination: 26° 25′ 54″
- Redshift: 0.021758
- Heliocentric radial velocity: 6523 km/s
- Distance: 300 Mly (93 Mpc)
- Apparent magnitude (V): 13.59

Characteristics
- Type: (R)SAB(s)ab
- Size: ~156,200 ly (47.89 kpc) (estimated)
- Apparent size (V): 1.4′ × 1.3′

Other designations
- UGC 07163, CGCG 158-036, MCG +05-29-028, PGC 038721

NGC 4146 is a spiral galaxy located 300 million light-years away in the constellation Coma Berenices. It was discovered on April 6, 1785, by astronomer William Herschel. NGC 4146 is a field galaxy and is part of the Coma Supercluster.

NGC 4146 is a type 2 seyfert galaxy, and is host to a supermassive black hole with an estimated mass of 4.1 × 10^{8} M_{☉}.

== Supernova ==
One supernova has been observed in NGC 4146. SN 1963D (type unknown, mag. 15.8) was discovered by Leonida Rosino on January 22, 1963.

== See also ==
- Coma Supercluster
