= NGC 4076 =

Galaxy in the constellation Coma Berenices

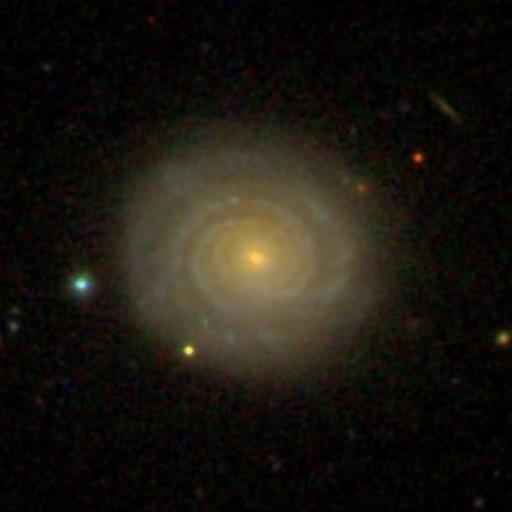
- NGC 4076 imaged by SDSS

Observation data (J2000 epoch)
- Constellation: Coma Berenices
- Right ascension: 12^{h} 04^{m} 32.5192^{s}
- Declination: 20° 12′ 18.084″
- Redshift: 0.020693
- Heliocentric radial velocity: 6204 km/s
- Distance: 313.9 ± 22.0 Mly (96.23 ± 6.74 Mpc)
- Group or cluster: NGC 4065 Group
- Apparent magnitude (V): 14.35

Characteristics
- Type: Sa
- Size: ~103,000 ly (31.6 kpc) (estimated)
- Apparent size (V): 0.9′ × 0.9′

Other designations
- UGC 7061, MCG +03-31-034, PGC 38209

NGC 4076 is a spiral galaxy located about 314 million light-years away in the constellation Coma Berenices. The galaxy was discovered by astronomer William Herschel on April 27, 1785 and is a member of the NGC 4065 Group.

NGC 4076 is classified as a LINER galaxy.

== Supernovae ==
NGC 4076 has been host to two supernovae.

- SN 2007M (Type Ia, mag. 19.2) was discovered by the Lick Observatory Supernova Search (LOSS) on January 14, 2007. It was also seen in a precovery image taken on December 24, 2006.
- SN 2011bc (Type Ia, mag. 17.3) was discovered by Ron Arbour and N. Kojima on April 1, 2011.
