= NGC 4093 =

Galaxy in the constellation Coma Berenices

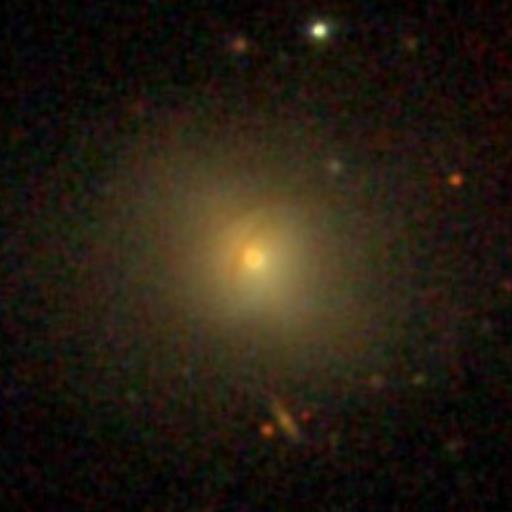
- SDSS image of NGC 4093.

Observation data (J2000 epoch)
- Constellation: Coma Berenices
- Right ascension: 12^{h} 05^{m} 51.4^{s}
- Declination: 20° 31′ 19″
- Redshift: 0.024037
- Heliocentric radial velocity: 7206 km/s
- Distance: 340 Mly (103 Mpc)
- Group or cluster: NGC 4065 Group
- Apparent magnitude (V): 14.52

Characteristics
- Type: E?
- Size: ~116,000 ly (35.5 kpc) (estimated)
- Apparent size (V): 0.25 x 0.25

Other designations
- PGC 038323, MCG +04-29-021

NGC 4093 is an elliptical galaxy located 340 million light-years away in the constellation Coma Berenices. The galaxy was discovered by astronomer Heinrich d'Arrest on May 4, 1864. NGC 4093 is a member of the NGC 4065 Group and is a radio galaxy with a two sided jet.

A rotating disk in the galaxy was detected by K. Geréb et al.

== See also ==
- List of NGC objects (4001–5000)
