= NGC 4056 =

Galaxy in the constellation Coma Berenices

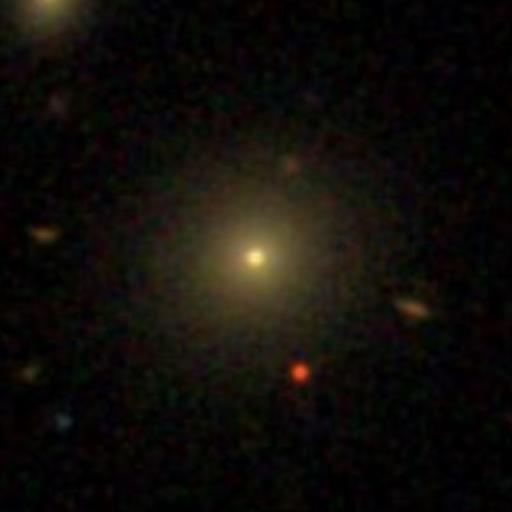
- SDSS image of NGC 4056.

Observation data (J2000 epoch)
- Constellation: Coma Berenices
- Right ascension: 12^{h} 03^{m} 57.8^{s}
- Declination: 20° 18′ 45″
- Redshift: 0.024637
- Heliocentric radial velocity: 7386 km/s
- Distance: 340 Mly (105 Mpc)
- Group or cluster: NGC 4065 Group
- Apparent magnitude (V): 17.68

Characteristics
- Type: E0?
- Size: ~65,000 ly (20 kpc) (estimated)
- Apparent size (V): 0.26 x 0.18

Other designations
- PGC 038140

NGC 4056 is an elliptical galaxy located about 340 million light-years away in the constellation Coma Berenices. The galaxy was discovered by astronomer Albert Marth on March 18, 1865 and is a member of the NGC 4065 Group.

Although NGC 4056 is commonly equated with PGC 38140, there is still uncertainty in its identification.

== See also ==
- List of NGC objects (4001–5000)
