= NGC 4089 =

Galaxy in the constellation of Coma Berenices

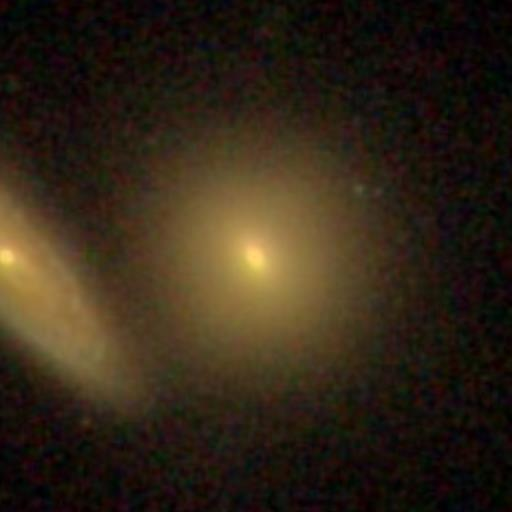
- SDSS image of NGC 4089. NGC 4091 can be seen to the left the image.

Observation data (J2000 epoch)
- Constellation: Coma Berenices
- Right ascension: 12^{h} 05^{m} 37.4^{s}
- Declination: 20° 33′ 21″
- Redshift: 0.024240
- Heliocentric radial velocity: 7267 km/s
- Distance: 340 Mly (103 Mpc)
- Group or cluster: NGC 4065 Group
- Apparent magnitude (V): 14.65

Characteristics
- Type: E?
- Size: ~100,000 ly (31 kpc) (estimated)
- Apparent size (V): 0.8 x 0.8

Other designations
- PGC 038298, MCG +04-29-017

NGC 4089 is an elliptical galaxy located 340 million light-years away in the constellation Coma Berenices. NGC 4089 was discovered by astronomer Heinrich d'Arrest on May 4, 1864 and is a member of the NGC 4065 Group.

The galaxy hosts an AGN.
