= NGC 4003 =

Lenticular galaxy in the constellation Leo

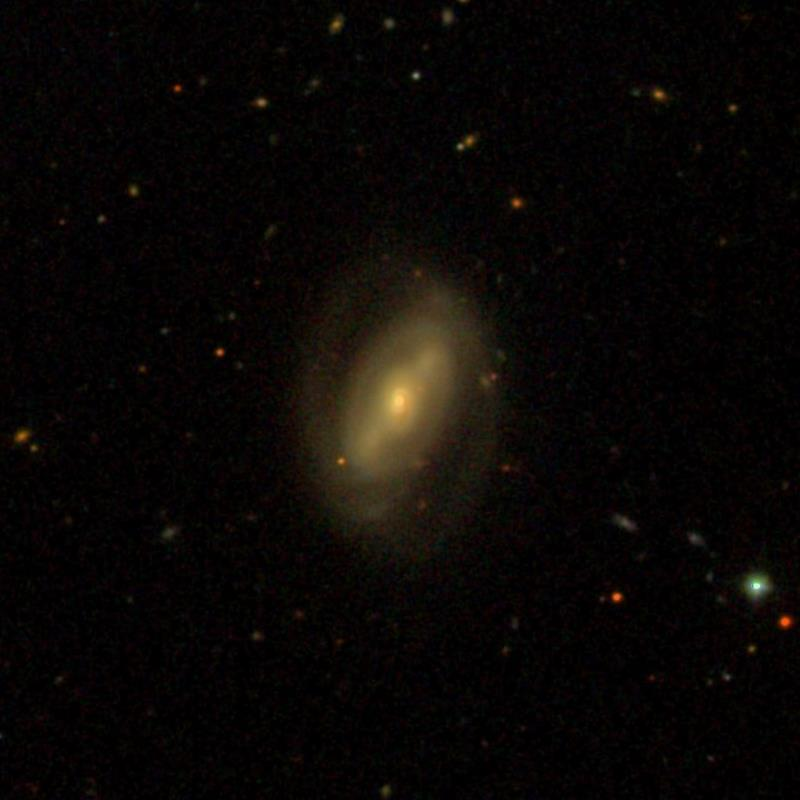
- SDSS image of NGC 4003.

Observation data (J2000 epoch)
- Constellation: Leo
- Right ascension: 11^{h} 57^{m} 59.0^{s}
- Declination: 23° 07′ 30″
- Redshift: 0.021848
- Heliocentric radial velocity: 6550 km/s
- Distance: 305 Mly (93.6 Mpc)
- Apparent magnitude (V): 14.28
- Absolute magnitude (B): -22.89

Characteristics
- Type: SB0
- Mass: 4.8 × 10^{10} M_{☉}
- Size: ~183,100 ly (56.13 kpc) (estimated)
- Apparent size (V): 1.5′ × 0.9′

Other designations
- UGC 06948, CGCG 127-115, MCG +04-28-105, PGC 037646

NGC 4003 is a barred lenticular galaxy located 305 million light-years away in the constellation Leo. It was discovered on April 10, 1785, by astronomer William Herschel. NGC 4003 forms a pair with the galaxy NGC 4002 known as [T2015] nest 102886, and is part of the Coma Supercluster.

NGC 4003 has a triple-ringed structure. It has a nucleus with a ringlike structure with dust lanes inside it, a strong bar surrounded by a second ring which is connected to broad spiral arms, and a nearly complete outer ring. It is thought the structure of NGC 4003 is a result of past interaction with NGC 4002.

NGC 4003 is a LINER galaxy, with star formation dominating its nucleus, and is host to a supermassive black hole with an estimated mass of 9.6 × 10^{8} M_{☉}.

== See also ==
- Coma Supercluster
