= NGC 4002 =

Galaxy in the constellation Leo

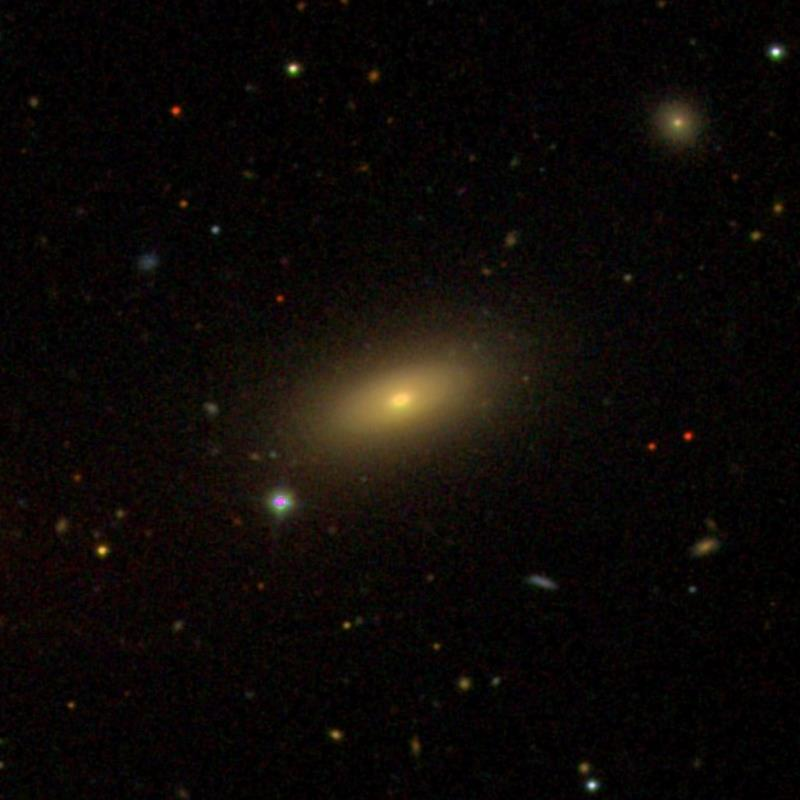
- SDSS image of NGC 4002.

Observation data (J2000 epoch)
- Constellation: Leo
- Right ascension: 11^{h} 57^{m} 59.3^{s}
- Declination: 23° 12′ 07″
- Redshift: 0.021959
- Heliocentric radial velocity: 6583 km/s
- Distance: 310 Mly (94 Mpc)
- Apparent magnitude (V): 14.96
- Absolute magnitude (B): -22.76

Characteristics
- Type: S0-a
- Size: ~155,300 ly (47.62 kpc) (estimated)
- Apparent size (V): 0.8′ × 0.4′

Other designations
- CGCG 127-116, MCG +04-28-104, PGC 037635

NGC 4002 is a lenticular galaxy located 310 million light-years away in the constellation Leo. It was discovered on April 10, 1785, by astronomer William Herschel. NGC 4002 forms a pair with the galaxy NGC 4003 known as [T2015] nest 102886, and is part of the Coma Supercluster.

NGC 4002 is a quasar candidate according to Simbad, and is host to a supermassive black hole with an estimated mass of 9 × 10^{8} M_{☉}.

== See also ==
- Coma Supercluster
