= NGC 4091 =

Galaxy in the constellation Coma Berenices

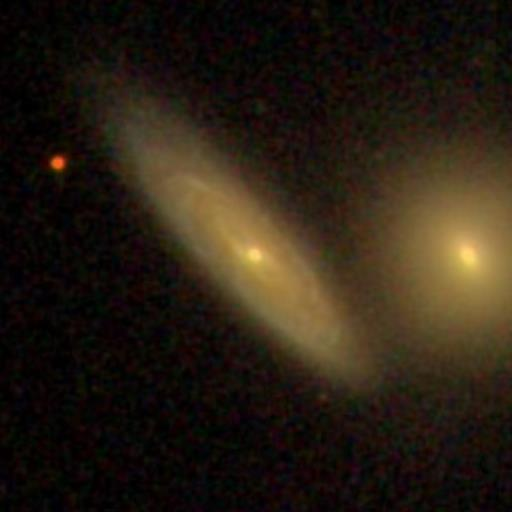
- SDSS image of NGC 4091. NGC 4089 can be seen to the right the image.

Observation data (J2000 epoch)
- Constellation: Coma Berenices
- Right ascension: 12^{h} 05^{m} 40.1^{s}
- Declination: 20° 33′ 21″
- Redshift: 0.025638
- Heliocentric radial velocity: 7686 km/s
- Distance: 360 Mly (109 Mpc)
- Group or cluster: NGC 4065 Group
- Apparent magnitude (V): 15.2

Characteristics
- Type: Sb
- Size: ~146,400 ly (44.89 kpc) (estimated)
- Apparent size (V): 1.1 x 0.25

Other designations
- UGC 07083, PGC 038308, MCG +04-29-019

NGC 4091 is a spiral galaxy located 360 million light-years away in the constellation Coma Berenices. The galaxy was discovered by astronomer Heinrich d'Arrest on May 2, 1864. NGC 4091 is a member of the NGC 4065 Group and is a LINER galaxy.

== See also ==
- List of NGC objects (4001–5000)
