= NGC 4053 =

Galaxy in the constellation Coma Berenices

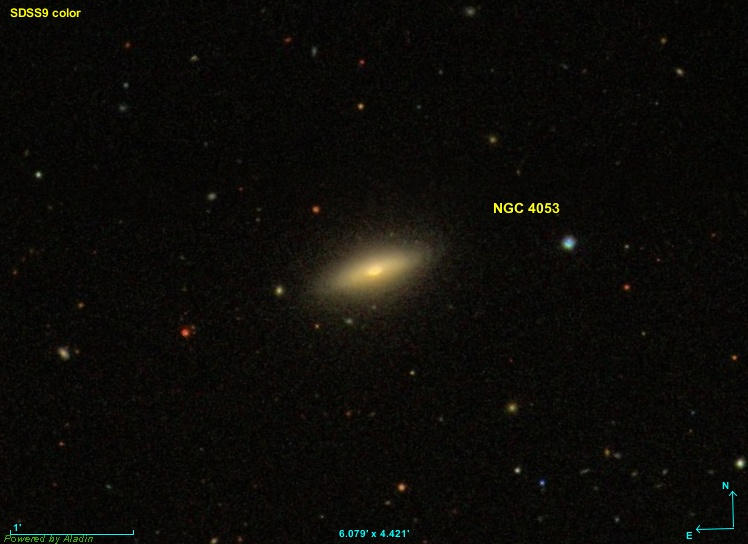
- SDSS image of NGC 4053.

Observation data (J2000 epoch)
- Constellation: Coma Berenices
- Right ascension: 12^{h} 03^{m} 11.6^{s}
- Declination: 19° 43′ 44″
- Redshift: 0.023900
- Heliocentric radial velocity: 7165 km/s
- Distance: 330 Mly (102 Mpc)
- Group or cluster: NGC 4065 Group
- Apparent magnitude (V): 14.6

Characteristics
- Type: S0/a
- Size: ~135,200 ly (41.45 kpc) (estimated)
- Apparent size (V): 1.1 x 0.4

Other designations
- UGC 07029, PGC 038069, MCG +03-31-024

NGC 4053 is a lenticular galaxy located 330 million light-years away in the constellation Coma Berenices. The galaxy was discovered by astronomer Heinrich d'Arrest on May 9, 1864. NGC 4053 is a member of the NGC 4065 Group and is a LINER galaxy.

== See also ==
- List of NGC objects (4001–5000)
