= NGC 3988 =

Galaxy in the constellation Leo

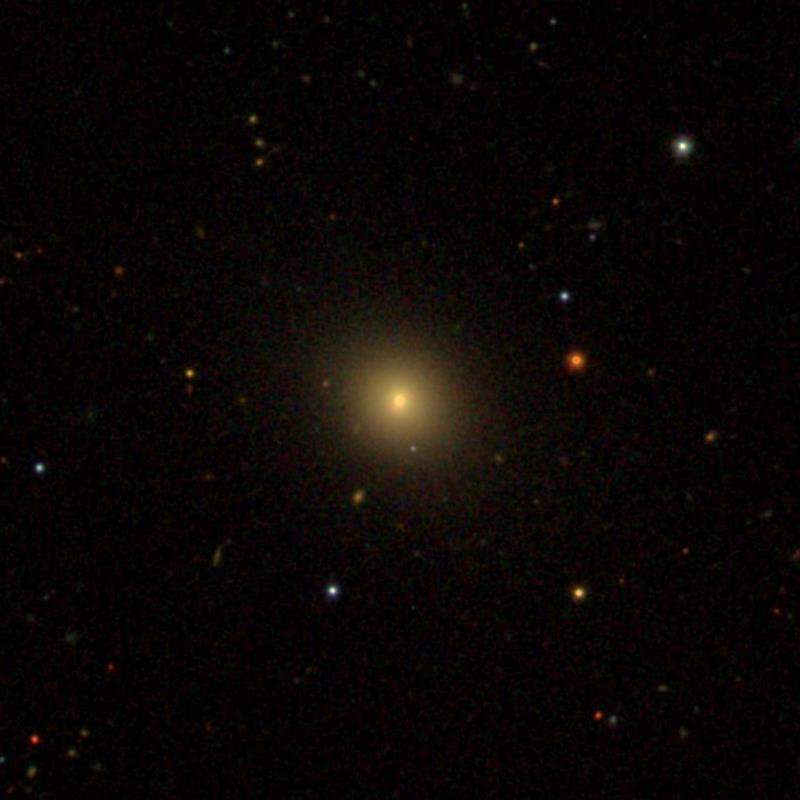
- SDSS image of NGC 3988.

Observation data (J2000 epoch)
- Constellation: Leo
- Right ascension: 11^{h} 57^{m} 24.2^{s}
- Declination: 27° 52′ 39″
- Redshift: 0.021788
- Heliocentric radial velocity: 6532 km/s
- Distance: 304 Mly (93.1 Mpc)
- Apparent magnitude (V): 14.3
- Absolute magnitude (B): -21.88

Characteristics
- Type: E
- Size: ~80,400 ly (24.64 kpc) (estimated)
- Apparent size (V): 0.81′ × 0.70′

Other designations
- CGCG 157-061, MCG +05-28-057, PGC 037609

NGC 3988 is a compact elliptical galaxy located 304 million light-years away in the constellation Leo. It was discovered on April 13, 1831, by astronomer John Herschel. NGC 3988 is a field galaxy, and is part of the Coma Supercluster.

NGC 3988 is host to a supermassive black hole with an estimated mass of 7.3 × 10^{8} M_{☉}.

== See also ==
- Coma Supercluster
