= NGC 4090 =

Galaxy in the constellation Coma Berenices

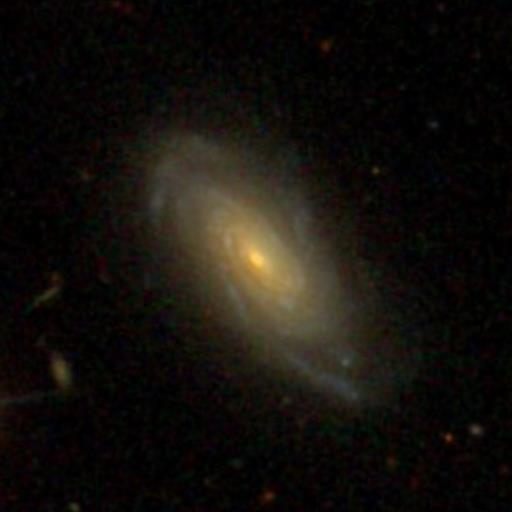
- SDSS image of NGC 4090

Observation data (J2000 epoch)
- Constellation: Coma Berenices
- Right ascension: 12^{h} 05^{m} 27.9^{s}
- Declination: 20° 18′ 32″
- Redshift: 0.024460
- Heliocentric radial velocity: 7333 km/s
- Distance: 340 Mly (104 Mpc)
- Group or cluster: NGC 4065 Group
- Apparent magnitude (V): 14.85

Characteristics
- Type: Sab
- Size: ~135,000 ly (41.4 kpc) (estimated)
- Apparent size (V): 1.2 x 0.5

Other designations
- UGC 07077, PGC 038288, MCG +04-29-015

NGC 4090 is a spiral galaxy located 340 million light-years away in the constellation Coma Berenices. The galaxy was discovered by astronomer Heinrich d'Arrest on May 2, 1864 and is a member of the NGC 4065 Group.

NGC 4090 hosts an AGN.

On April 5, 2018 a Type Ia supernova designated as SN 2018aqh was discovered in NGC 4090.

== See also ==
- List of NGC objects (4001–5000)
