= NGC 4065 =

Galaxy in the constellation Coma Berenices

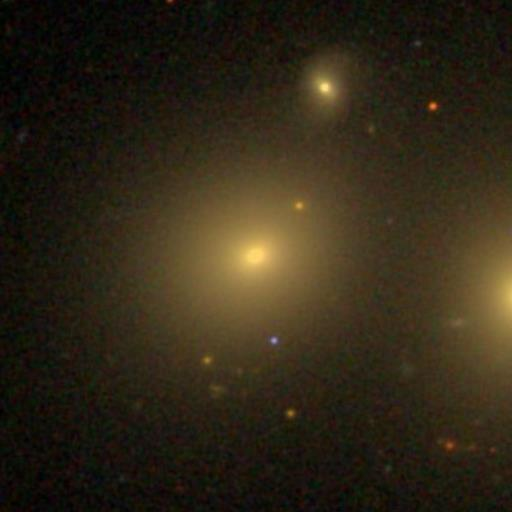
- SDSS image of NGC 4065. The halo of NGC 4061 can be seen at the right of the image.

Observation data (J2000 epoch)
- Constellation: Coma Berenices
- Right ascension: 12^{h} 04^{m} 06.2^{s}
- Declination: 20° 14′ 06″
- Redshift: 0.021101
- Heliocentric radial velocity: 6326 km/s
- Distance: 300 Mly (91 Mpc)
- Group or cluster: NGC 4065 Group
- Apparent magnitude (V): 13.58

Characteristics
- Type: E
- Size: ~120,000 ly (37 kpc) (estimated)
- Apparent size (V): 1.1 x 1.0

Other designations
- NGC 4057, MCG +04-29-007, PGC 038156, UGC 07050, VV 179a

NGC 4065 is an elliptical galaxy located 300 million light-years away in the constellation Coma Berenices. The galaxy was discovered by astronomer William Herschel on April 27, 1785. It was then rediscovered by John Herschel on April 29, 1832 and was listed as NGC 4057. NGC 4065 is the brightest member of the NGC 4065 Group.

NGC 4065 is a companion of NGC 4061. The two galaxies form an interacting pair, as evidenced by distortions in their optical isophotes.

It is classified as a radio galaxy.

== See also ==
- List of NGC objects (4001–5000)
