= NGC 4086 =

Galaxy in the constellation Coma Berenices

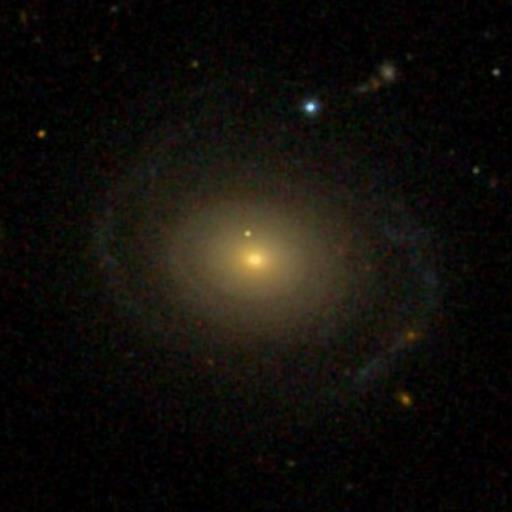
- SDSS image of NGC 4086.

Observation data (J2000 epoch)
- Constellation: Coma Berenices
- Right ascension: 12^{h} 05^{m} 29.4^{s}
- Declination: 20° 14′ 48″
- Redshift: 0.023660
- Heliocentric radial velocity: 7093 km/s
- Distance: 330 Mly (101 Mpc)
- Group or cluster: NGC 4065 Group
- Apparent magnitude (V): 14.59

Characteristics
- Type: S0
- Size: ~130,000 ly (41 kpc) (estimated)
- Apparent size (V): 1.0 x 0.9

Other designations
- UGC 07076, PGC 038290, MCG +04-29-016

NGC 4086 is a lenticular galaxy located 330 million light-years away in the constellation Coma Berenices. NGC 4086 was discovered by astronomer Heinrich d'Arrest on May 2, 1864 and is a member of the NGC 4065 Group.

NGC 4086 is classified as a LINER galaxy.

== See also ==
- List of NGC objects (4001–5000)
