= NGC 4692 =

Elliptical galaxy

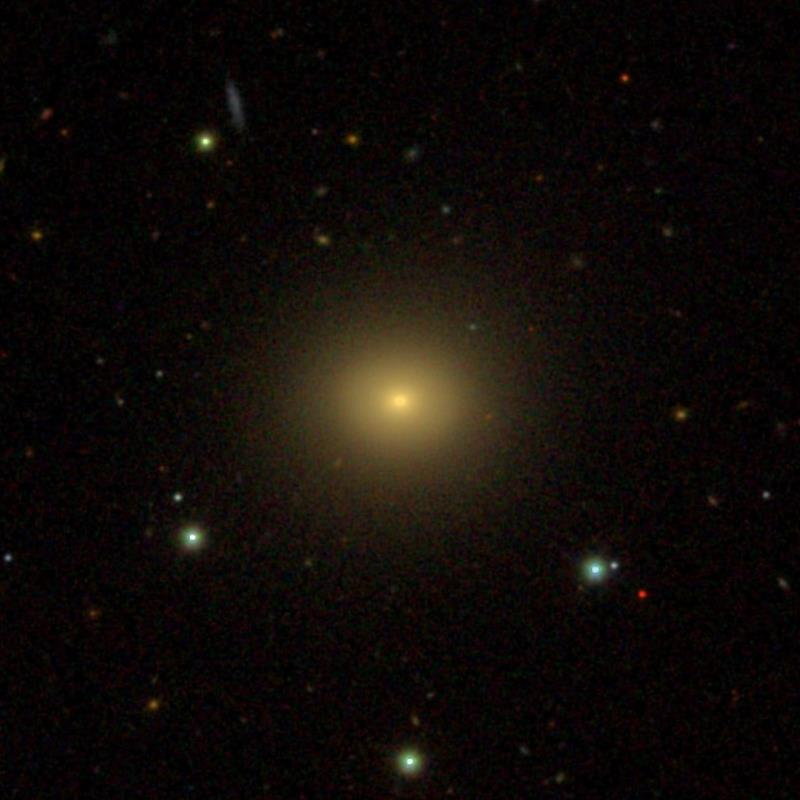
- SDSS image of NGC 4692.

Observation data (J2000 epoch)
- Constellation: Coma Berenices
- Right ascension: 12^{h} 47^{m} 55.3^{s}
- Declination: 27° 13′ 21″
- Redshift: 0.026605
- Heliocentric radial velocity: 7976 km/s
- Distance: 370 Mly (112 Mpc)
- Apparent magnitude (V): 13.64
- Absolute magnitude (B): -23.22

Characteristics
- Type: E+
- Size: ~154,200 ly (47.29 kpc) (estimated)
- Apparent size (V): 1.3′ × 1.3′

Other designations
- UGC 07967, CGCG 159-078, MCG +05-30-086, PGC 043200

NGC 4692 is an elliptical galaxy located 370 million light-years away in the constellation Coma Berenices. It was discovered on April 11, 1785, by astronomer William Herschel. NGC 4692 is the brightest member of a group of 11 galaxies, known as [T2015] nest 100111, which is also known as the NGC 4692 Group and is part of the Coma Supercluster.

According to Harold Corwin, NGC 4702 is equal to NGC 4692, with the former designation simply being a reobservation of NGC 4692.

NGC 4692 is host to a supermassive black hole with an estimated mass of 9 × 10^{8} M_{☉}.
