= NGC 4095 =

Galaxy in the constellation Coma Berenices

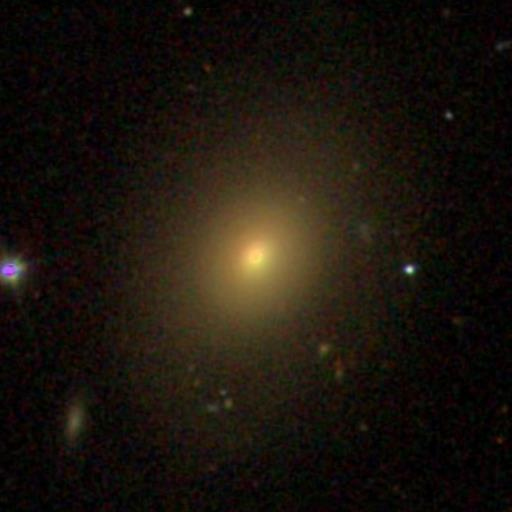
- SDSS image of NGC 4095.

Observation data (J2000 epoch)
- Constellation: Coma Berenices
- Right ascension: 12^{h} 05^{m} 54.2^{s}
- Declination: 20° 34′ 21″
- Redshift: 0.023843
- Heliocentric radial velocity: 7148 km/s
- Distance: 330 Mly (102 Mpc)
- Group or cluster: NGC 4065 Group
- Apparent magnitude (V): 14.6

Characteristics
- Type: E
- Size: ~150,000 ly (47 kpc) (estimated)
- Apparent size (V): 0.80 x 0.60

Other designations
- PGC 038324, MCG +04-29-022

NGC 4095 is an elliptical galaxy located 330 million light-years away in the constellation Coma Berenices. The galaxy was discovered by astronomer William Herschel on April 26, 1785. NGC 4095 is a member of the NGC 4065 Group and is a LINER.

== See also ==
- List of NGC objects (4001–5000)
