= NGC 1278 =

Galaxy in the constellation Perseus

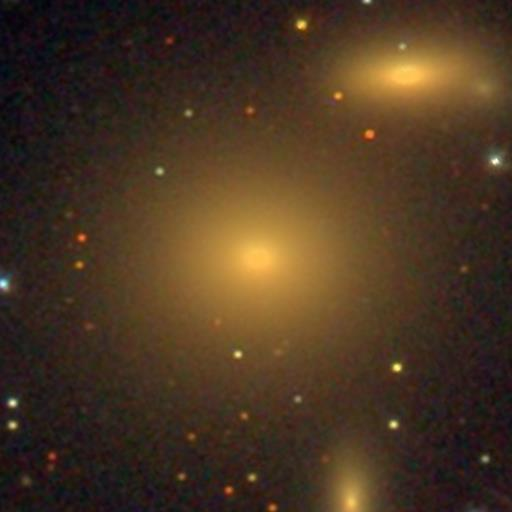
- SDSS image of NGC 1278 (center), NGC 1277 can be seen to the upper right of the image.

Observation data (J2000 epoch)
- Constellation: Perseus
- Right ascension: 03^{h} 19^{m} 54.1376^{s}
- Declination: +41° 33′ 48.212″
- Redshift: 0.020314
- Heliocentric radial velocity: 6090 km/s
- Distance: 226.74 ± 23.31 Mly (69.518 ± 7.147 Mpc)
- Group or cluster: Perseus Cluster
- Apparent magnitude (V): 13.57

Characteristics
- Type: E pec
- Size: ~128,600 ly (39.43 kpc) (estimated)
- Apparent size (V): 1.5′ × 1.3′

Other designations
- IC 1907, UGC 2670, MCG +07-07-065, PGC 12438, CGCG 540-105

NGC 1278 is an elliptical galaxy located about 230 million light-years away in the constellation Perseus. NGC 1278 was discovered by astronomer Heinrich d'Arrest on February 14, 1863. It was then rediscovered by astronomer Guillaume Bigourdan on October 22, 1884, and later listed as IC 1907. NGC 1278 is a member of the Perseus Cluster and is a low-luminosity AGN (LLAGN).

One supernova has been observed in NGC 1278: SN 2016ajf (Type Ia-91bg-like, mag. 16.9) was discovered by Kōichi Itagaki on February 18, 2016.

== Globular clusters ==
Unlike the nearby galaxy NGC 1277 which has a dominant population of metal-rich or “red” globular clusters, NGC 1278 has a rich population of both metal-rich and metal-poor or “blue” globular clusters.

== See also ==
- List of NGC objects (1001–2000)
- NGC 1275
- NGC 1277
