= NGC 4066 =

Galaxy in the constellation Coma Berenices

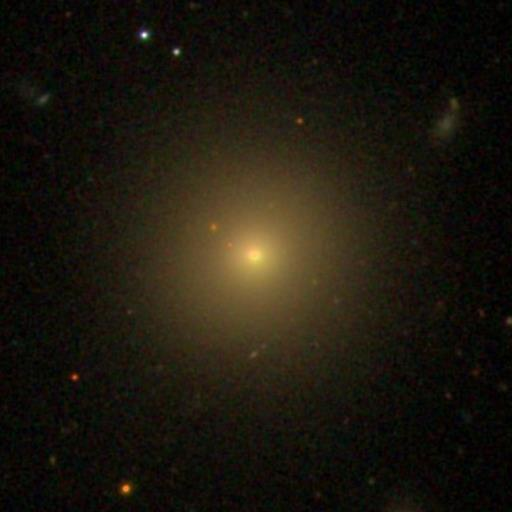
- SDSS image of NGC 4066

Observation data (J2000 epoch)
- Constellation: Coma Berenices
- Right ascension: 12^{h} 04^{m} 09.4^{s}
- Declination: 20° 20′ 53″
- Redshift: 0.024567
- Heliocentric radial velocity: 7365 km/s
- Distance: 340 Mly (105 Mpc)
- Group or cluster: NGC 4065 Group
- Apparent magnitude (V): 13.95

Characteristics
- Type: E
- Size: ~150,000 ly (47 kpc) (estimated)
- Apparent size (V): 1.2 x 1.2

Other designations
- MCG +04-29-008, PGC 038161, UGC 07051

NGC 4066 is an elliptical galaxy located 340 million light-years away in the constellation Coma Berenices. The galaxy was discovered by astronomer William Herschel on April 27, 1785. NGC 4066 is a member of the NGC 4065 Group.

== See also ==
- List of NGC objects (4001–5000)
