= NGC 4555 =

Galaxy in the constellation Coma Berenices

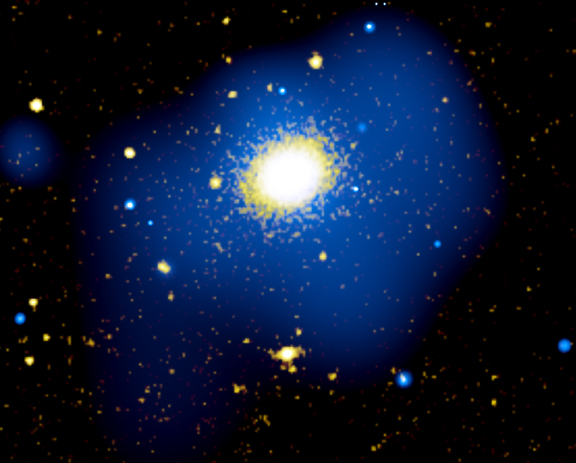
- NGC 4555 in X-ray and optical spectra

Observation data (J2000 epoch)
- Constellation: Coma Berenices
- Right ascension: 12^{h} 35^{m} 41.2^{s}
- Declination: +26° 31′ 23″
- Redshift: 6683 ± 24 km/s
- Apparent magnitude (V): 13.1

Characteristics
- Type: E
- Apparent size (V): 1.9′ × 1.6′

Other designations
- IC 3545, UGC 7762, PGC 41975

NGC 4555 is a solitary elliptical galaxy about 40,000 parsecs (125,000 light-years) across, and about 310 million light-years distant. Observations by the Chandra X-ray Observatory have shown it to be surrounded by a halo of hot gas about 120,000 parsecs across. The hot gas has a temperature of around 10,000,000 kelvin. The galaxy is one of the few elliptical galaxies proven to have significant amounts of dark matter. Large amounts of dark matter are necessary to prevent the gas from escaping the galaxy; the visible mass clearly is not large enough to hold such an extensive gas halo. The dark matter halo is estimated to have 10 times the mass of the stars in the galaxy.

NGC 4555 is important because of its isolation. Most elliptical galaxies are found in the cores of groups and clusters of galaxies, and almost all those for which dark matter estimates are available located in the centers of these larger systems. In these circumstances it is impossible to know whether the dark matter is associated with the galaxy or the surrounding cluster. NGC 4555, as a field galaxy, is not part of any group or cluster, and therefore provides strong evidence that dark matter can be associated with individual ellipticals.

Although considered isolated, NGC 4555 is now considered to be a member and the brightest member of a group of 12 galaxies known as [T2015] nest 100082, or the NGC 4555 Group, and is part of the Coma Supercluster.
