= NGC 1265 =

Galaxy in the constellation Perseus

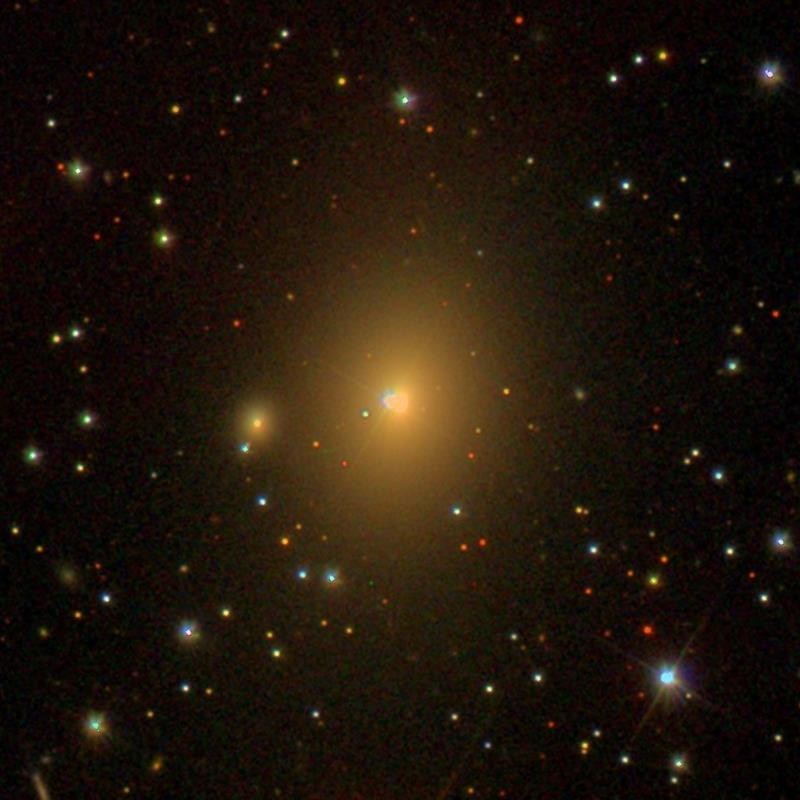
- SDSS image of NGC 1265

Observation data (J2000 epoch)
- Constellation: Perseus
- Right ascension: 03^{h} 18^{m} 15.738^{s}
- Declination: +41° 51′ 27.38″
- Redshift: 0.0251
- Apparent magnitude (V): 13.22

Characteristics
- Type: E
- Apparent size (V): 1.8′ × 1.6′

Other designations
- 3C 83.1B, LEDA 12287, UGC 2651

NGC 1265 is a Fanaroff and Riley class 1 radio galaxy located in the constellation Perseus, a member of the Perseus Cluster.
