= NGC 4065 Group =

Group of galaxies in the constellation of Coma Berenices

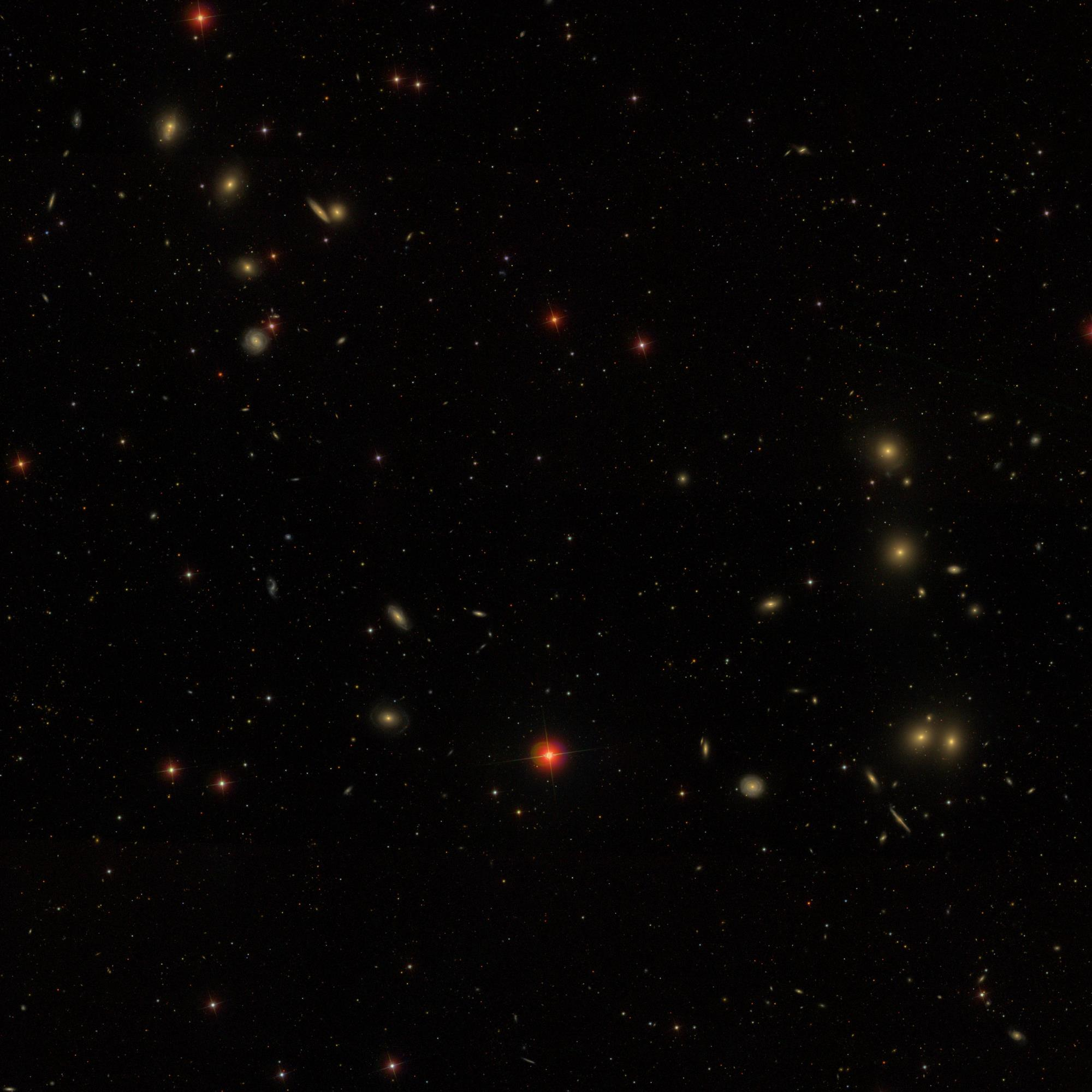
- SDSS image of the NGC 4065 Group. The two subclusters surrounding the galaxy pair NGC 4061 and NGC 4065 (lower right) and NGC 4095 (upper left) can be seen.

Observation data (Epoch J2000)
- Constellation: Coma Berenices
- Right ascension: 12^{h} 04^{m} 09.5^{s}
- Declination: 20° 13′ 18″
- Brightest member: NGC 4065
- Number of galaxies: 74
- Velocity dispersion: 416 ± 35 km/s
- Redshift: 0.023500 (7045 km/s)
- Distance: 100 Mpc (326.2 Mly)
- X-ray luminosity: 0.05×10^{42.64} erg/s

Other designations
- GH 98, N79-299a, N79-299b, WBL 374, ZW 1202.0+2028, USGC U451, NRGb 177, RASSCALS NRGb 177

The NGC 4065 Group is a group of galaxies located about 330 Mly (100 Mpc) in the constellation Coma Berenices. The group's brightest member is NGC 4065 and located in the Coma Supercluster.

The group is dominated by mostly elliptical galaxies with only 15 to 31 percent of the members being spiral galaxies.

== X-ray emission ==
The NGC 4065 Group exhibits bimodal X-ray emission with one peak on the galaxies NGC 4061 and NGC 4065 and the other on NGC 4066.

== Structure ==
The NGC 4065 Group appears to consist of two subgroups known as UZC-CG 156 and UZC-CG 157 which are indistinguishable by velocity.

However, White et al. suggests that the group contains three subgroups with subgroups A and C being centered on NGC 4065 and NGC 4095 respectively, and subgroup B which consists of the galaxies NGC 4086 and NGC 4090.

At the center of the group lie the elliptical galaxies NGC 4061 and NGC 4065.

== Nearby groups ==
The NGC 4065 Group is located near the Leo Cluster and is part of a bridge of galaxies that connects the Leo Cluster to the Coma Cluster.

== See also ==
- NGC 4065
- Leo Cluster
- Coma Cluster
- List of Galaxy Groups
