= Coma Supercluster =

Galaxy supercluster in the constellation Coma Berenices

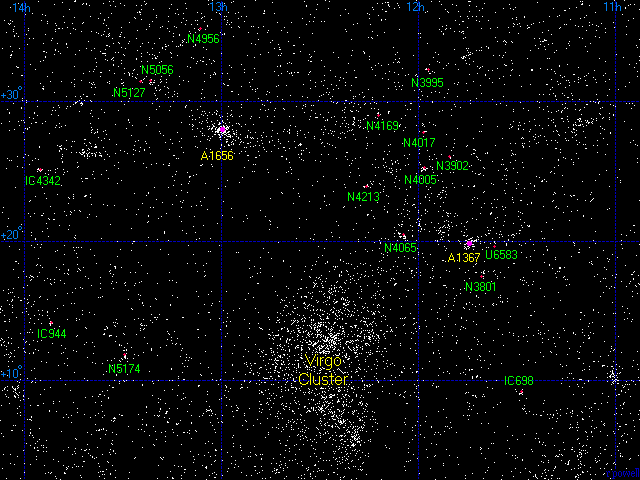
- A map of the Coma Supercluster

Observation data (Epoch J2000)
- Constellation: Coma Berenices
- Right ascension: 12h 24m 06.8s
- Declination: +23d 55m 23s
- Redshift: 0.023
- Distance: 92 Mpc (300 Mly)

The Coma Supercluster (SCl 117) is a nearby supercluster of galaxies that includes the Coma Cluster (Abell 1656) and the Leo Cluster (Abell 1367). Both galaxy cluster are found to be X-ray Luminous galaxy clusters.

Located 300 million light-years from Earth in the constellation Coma Berenices, it is in the center of the Great Wall and a part of the Coma Filament. It is roughly spherical, about 98 mega light-years in diameter, and contains more than 3,000 galaxies.

Although the extent of the Coma Cluster has been understood since around 1900, it took several decades for the existence of the supercluster to be discovered; this was due to the very large physical separation (around 21 Mpc) and angular separation (around 20°) between the Coma and Leo Clusters. In 1977, further analysis of the redshifts of hundreds of galaxies within the supercluster confirmed that these were all part of a larger group of clusters. Despite this, it was still one of the first superclusters to be discovered, and helped astronomers understand the large-scale structure of the universe.

== Composition ==
The Coma Supercluster contains three distinct populations of galaxies: galaxies in the cores of the two main clusters (Coma and Leo), galaxies in low mass groups, and a few isolated galaxies. The dominant structure of the supercluster is four distinct chains of clusters, each one roughly 80 Mpc long. Between each cluster chain is a relatively empty region of space.

=== Core population ===
Galaxies found at the cores of clusters are high in density and have a high velocity dispersion: around 1000 km/s in Abell 1656, and slightly lower than this in Abell 1367. These galaxies tend to be either elliptical or lenticular galaxies, suggesting that they have undergone mergers or tidal stripping.

=== Low-mass groups ===
The Galaxies found in low mass groups are usually spiral galaxies with lower velocity dispersions, around 300 km/s. These are less dense and more loosely bound, which opens the door for possible future accretion into one of the main clusters.

=== Isolated galaxies ===
Isolated galaxies have the lowest density and are widely spread out. They are mostly spiral galaxies, suggesting ongoing star formation.

== Kinematics ==
Multiple peaks in the distribution of the redshifts of the galaxies in the Coma Supercluster suggest that the system is not gravitationally relaxed, which would result in many galaxy groups maintaining their own individual velocities. This implies that they still have not yet fully merged into the supercluster, but are expected to eventually.

This is supported by the general motion of the galaxies, which is moving inwards towards the core of the cluster.

== See also ==
- Abell catalogue
- Large-scale structure of the universe
- List of Abell clusters
