= NGC 4253 =

Galaxy in the constellation of Coma Berenices

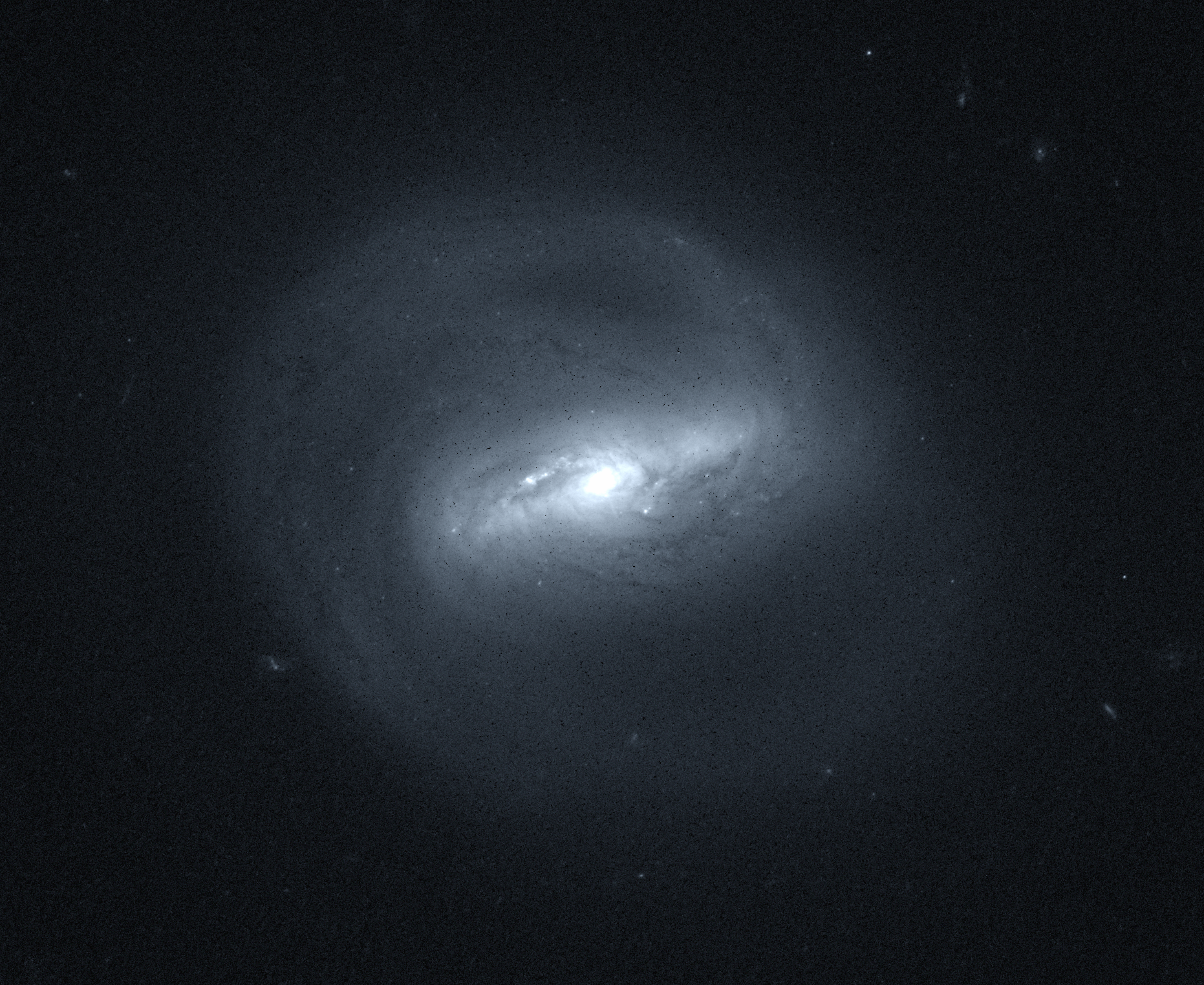
- NGC 4253 by the Hubble Space Telescope

Observation data (J2000 epoch)
- Constellation: Coma Berenices
- Right ascension: 12^{h} 18^{m} 26.5^{s}
- Declination: +29° 48′ 46″
- Redshift: 0.012882 ± 0.000050
- Heliocentric radial velocity: 3,862 ± 15 km/s
- Distance: 185 Mly (56.6 Mpc)
- Apparent magnitude (V): 13.5

Characteristics
- Type: (R')SB(s)a
- Apparent size (V): 1.0′ × 0.8′
- Notable features: Seyfert galaxy

Other designations
- UGC 7344, MRK 766, MCG +05-29-051, PGC 39525

NGC 4253 is a barred spiral galaxy located in the constellation Coma Berenices. It is located at a distance of about 185 million light years from Earth, which, given its apparent dimensions, means that NGC 4253 is about 65,000 light years across. It was discovered by William Herschel on February 3, 1788. It is a Seyfert galaxy.

== Characteristics ==
The NGC 4253 is a barred galaxy with thick bar, while the arms form a ring. Marquez et al. suggested that the galaxy has a secondary bar perpendicular to the main bar, although that could be an artifact due to the presence of strong dust lanes and no inner bar is visible in images by WFPC2 F606W of the Hubble Space Telescope. There is evidence of star formation along the dust lanes in the leading edge of the bar, especially at the east half.

The nucleus of NGC 4253 has been found to be active and it has been categorised as a narrow line type I Seyfert galaxy. The most accepted theory for the energy source of active galactic nuclei is the presence of an accretion disk around a supermassive black hole. The mass of the black hole in the centre of NGC 5506 is estimated to be 1–13 × 10^{6} M_{☉} based on reverberation mapping of the hydrogen lines, 1.6+1.4
−1.2×10^{6} M_{☉} based on time lag spectra, and 1.26+1.00
−0.77×10^{6} M_{☉} based on X-ray variations.

The nucleus emits X-rays. The X-rays have been found to vary in intensity, exhibiting quasi-periodic oscillation, although this phenomenon appears to be transient. The variability was found by ROSAT X-ray satellite. The intensity varied by a factor of 3 every 6,450 seconds (about 1.8 hours) based on observations by XMM-Newton in 2005, while in 2000 that period was estimated to be 4,200 seconds. It has been suggested that the source of the oscillation lies at the inner part of the accretion disk.

The galaxy has been found to host a maser and is a compact source in radiowaves.

== Nearby galaxies ==
NGC 4253 belongs to a galaxy group known as LGG 276. Other members of this group includes the galaxies NGC 4131, NGC 4134, NGC 4169, NGC 4174, NGC 4175, NGC 4185, NGC 4196, NGC 4132, MCG 5-29-24, MCG 5-29-35, UGC 7221, and UGC 7294. NGC 4245 lies at a projected distance of 16.5 arcminuntes.

== See also ==
- NGC 4593 – a similar barred galaxy which hosts an active nucleus
- NGC 5506 – another similar Seyfert galaxy
