= NGC 6646 =

Spiral galaxy in the constellation Lyra

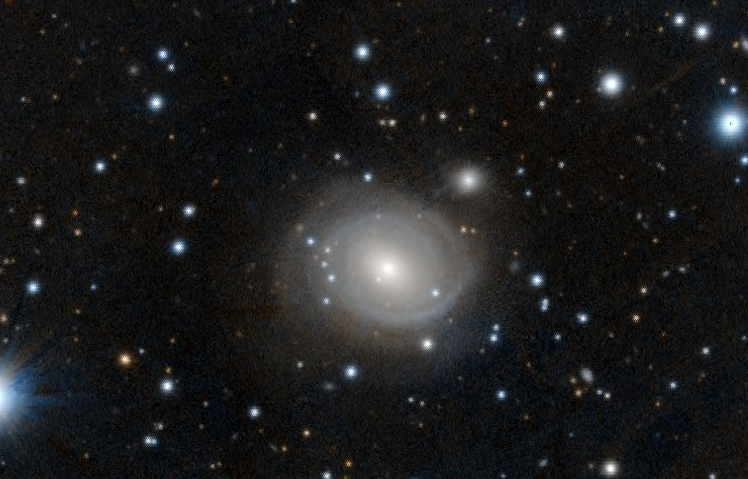
- NGC 6466 imaged by the Pan-STARRS survey

Observation data (J2000 epoch)
- Constellation: Lyra
- Right ascension: 118^{h} 29^{m} 38.742^{s}
- Declination: +39° 51′ 54.528″
- Redshift: 0.019227
- Heliocentric radial velocity: 5764 ± 34 km/s
- Distance: 271.4 ± 19.1 Mly (83.21 ± 5.87 Mpc)
- Apparent magnitude (V): 12.6
- Apparent magnitude (B): 13.5
- Surface brightness: 13.40 mag/am2

Characteristics
- Type: Sa
- Size: ~173,900 ly (53.33 kpc) (estimated)

Other designations
- UGC 11258, MCG +07-38-008, PGC 61944, CGCG 228-010

NGC 6646 is a spiral galaxy located in the constellation Lyra. Its velocity relative to the cosmic microwave background is 5,641 ± 35 km/s, which corresponds to a Hubble distance of 83.2 ± 5.9 Mpc (~271 million ly). NGC 6646 was discovered by German-British astronomer William Herschel on 26 June 1802. The luminosity class of NGC 6646 is I.

One supernova has been observed in NGC 6646: SN 2024gqf (Type Ia, mag. 19.7) was discovered by the Catalina Real-time Transient Survey (SNHunt) on 15 April 2024.

== See also ==
- List of NGC objects (6001–7000)
