= NGC 268 =

Spiral galaxy located in the constellation Cetus

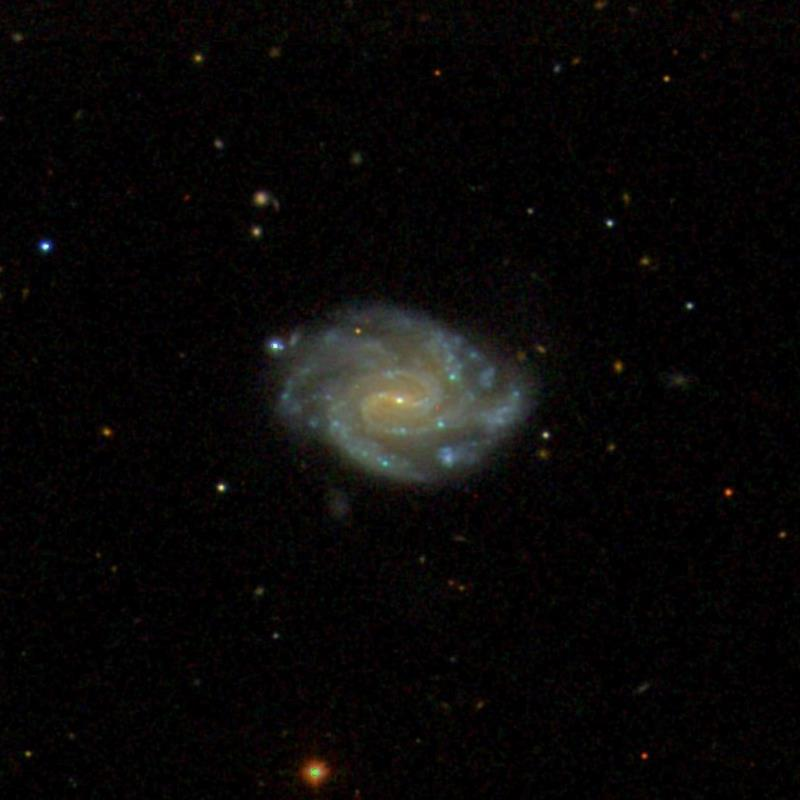
- SDSS image of NGC 268

Observation data (J2000 epoch)
- Constellation: Cetus
- Right ascension: 00^{h} 50^{m} 09.5^{s}
- Declination: −05° 11′ 37″
- Redshift: 0.018326
- Apparent magnitude (V): 13.41

Characteristics
- Type: SBbc
- Apparent size (V): 1.6' × 1.1'

Other designations
- MCG -01-03-017, 2MASX J00500956-0511376, 2MASXi J0050095-051136, IRAS 00476-0527, F00476-0527, 6dF J0050096-051137, PGC 2927.

NGC 268 is a spiral galaxy located in the constellation Cetus. It was discovered on November 22, 1785 by William Herschel.

== Supernova ==
One supernova has been observed in NGC 268: SN 2012W (Type II, mag. 16.6) was discovered by the Catalina Real-time Transient Survey and Stan Howerton on 26 January 2012.
