= NGC 5442 =

Galaxy in the constellation Virgo

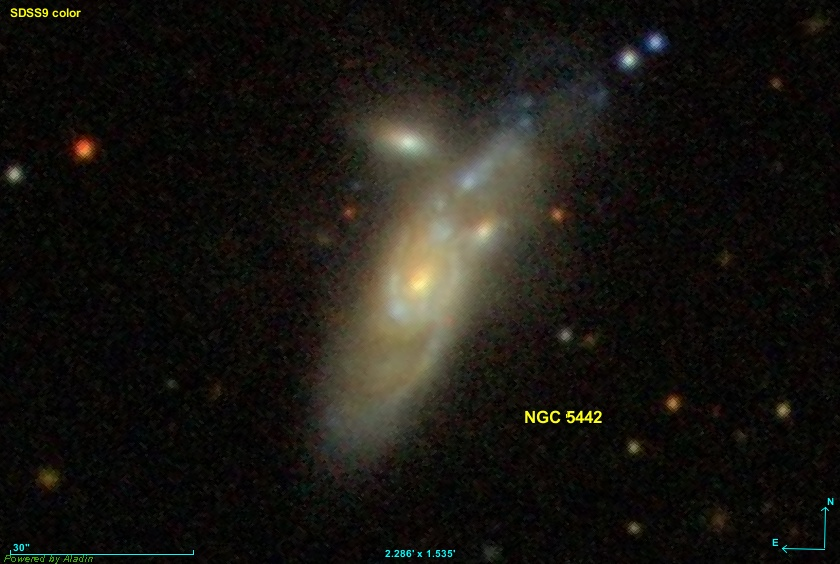
- NGC 5442 imaged by SDSS

Observation data (J2000 epoch)
- Constellation: Virgo
- Right ascension: 14^{h} 04^{m} 43.1985^{s}
- Declination: −09° 42′ 48.128″
- Redshift: 0.028630±0.0000730
- Heliocentric radial velocity: 8,583±22 km/s
- Distance: 426.0 ± 29.9 Mly (130.61 ± 9.16 Mpc)
- Apparent magnitude (V): 14.5

Characteristics
- Type: SB(s)b pec
- Size: ~192,000 ly (58.88 kpc) (estimated)
- Apparent size (V): 1.2′ × 0.5′

Other designations
- IRAS 14020-0928, MCG -01-36-006, PGC 50189, VV 691

NGC 5442 is a barred spiral galaxy in the constellation of Virgo. Its velocity with respect to the cosmic microwave background is 6,130±26 km/s, which corresponds to a Hubble distance of 294.9 ± 20.7 Mly (90.41 ± 6.34 Mpc). It was discovered by German astronomer Albert Marth on 11 January 1865.

== Supernovae ==
Three supernovae have been observed in NGC 5442:

- SN 2001U (Type Ia, mag. 17.7) was discovered by LOTOSS (Lick Observatory and Tenagra Observatory Supernova Searches) on 3 February 2001.
- SN 2011bz (Type Ia, mag. 17.4) was discovered by the Catalina Real-time Transient Survey on 24 April 2011.
- SN 2024jrx (Type II, mag. 19.3244) was discovered by Automatic Learning for the Rapid Classification of Events (ALeRCE) on 27 May 2024.

== See also ==
- List of NGC objects (5001–6000)
