= NGC 60 =

Spiral Galaxy in the constellation Pisces

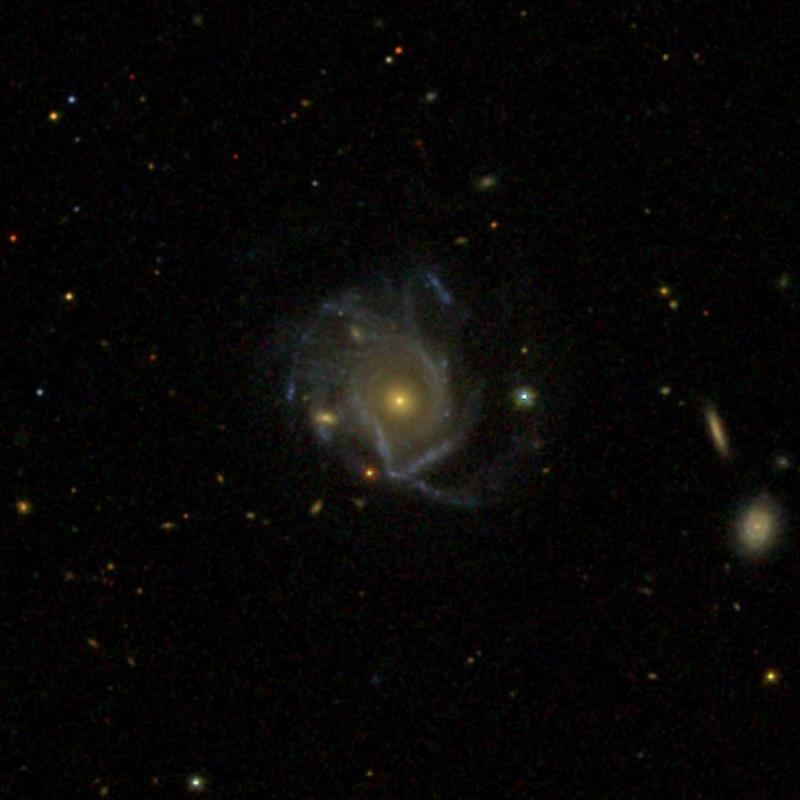
- NGC 60 (SDSS DR14)

Observation data (2000.0 epoch)
- Constellation: Pisces
- Right ascension: 00^{h} 15^{m} 58.28^{s}
- Declination: −00° 18′ 12.7″
- Redshift: 0.039452
- Heliocentric radial velocity: 11,827 ± 27 km/s
- Distance: ~500 Mly (Redshift-based)
- Apparent magnitude (V): 14.85

Characteristics
- Type: Sc
- Apparent size (V): 1'.30 × 1'.20

Other designations
- UGC 150, MCG 0-1-48, ZWG 382.37, PGC 1058

NGC 60 is an Sc type spiral galaxy in the constellation Pisces. It was discovered on 2 November 1882 by Édouard Stephan.

NGC 60 is noticed for its unusually distorted spiral arms, which are commonly due to gravitational effects of neighboring galaxies, but there are no galaxies around NGC 60 to allow this.

== Supernova ==
One supernovae has been observed in NGC 60:

- SN 2023zba (Type II-P, mag. 18.8) was discovered by the Catalina Real-time Transient Survey on 7 December 2023.
