= NGC 7316 =

Galaxy in the constellation Pegasus

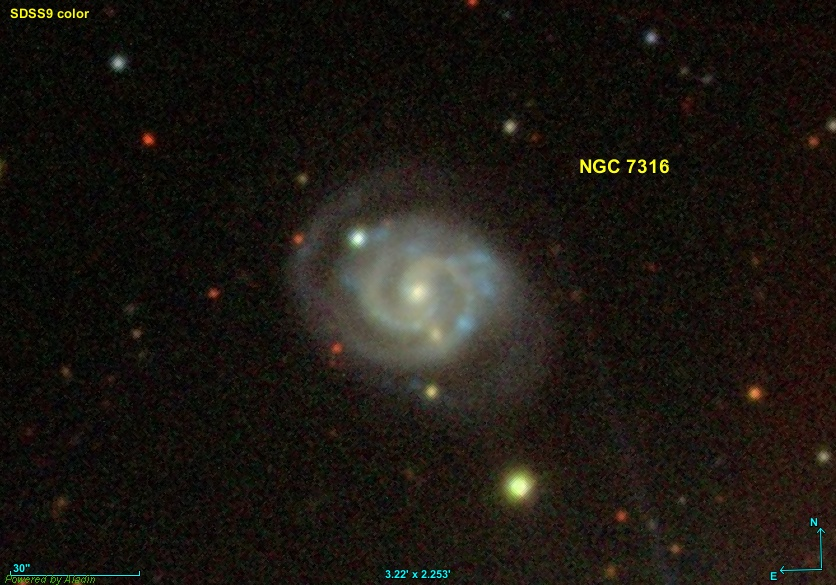
- NGC 7316 imaged by SDSS

Observation data (J2000 epoch)
- Constellation: Pegasus
- Right ascension: 22^{h} 35^{m} 56.3485^{s}
- Declination: +20° 19′ 19.666″
- Redshift: 0.018529±0.00000200
- Heliocentric radial velocity: 5,555±1 km/s
- Distance: 212.87 ± 3.89 Mly (65.267 ± 1.192 Mpc)
- Apparent magnitude (V): 13.62

Characteristics
- Type: SBc
- Size: ~77,800 ly (23.86 kpc) (estimated)
- Apparent size (V): 1.1′ × 0.9′

Other designations
- IRAS 22335+2003, 2MASX J22355633+2019201, UGC 12098, MCG +03-57-020, Mrk 307, PGC 69259, CGCG 452-030

NGC 7316 is a barred spiral galaxy in the constellation of Pegasus. Its velocity with respect to the cosmic microwave background is 5,198±25 km/s, which corresponds to a Hubble distance of 250.1 ± 17.5 Mly (76.67 ± 5.38 Mpc). However, three non-redshift measurements give a closer mean distance of 212.87 ± 3.89 Mly (65.267 ± 1.192 Mpc). It was discovered by German-British astronomer William Herschel on 18 September 1784.

NGC 7316 has a possible active galactic nucleus, i.e. it has a compact region at the center of a galaxy that emits a significant amount of energy across the electromagnetic spectrum, with characteristics indicating that this luminosity is not produced by the stars. NGC 7316 is also a starburst galaxy.

NGC 7316 has a nucleus with excessive amounts of ultraviolet emissions compared with other galaxies, and is listed in the Markarian catalogue as MRK 307.

== Galaxy group ==
According to M. J. Geller and J. P. Huchra, NGC 7316 is a member of a galaxy group which contains 2 other galaxies: NGC 7321 and NGC 7323.

== Supernovae ==
Two supernovae have been observed in NGC 7316:

- SN 2006cx (Type II, mag. 17.4) was discovered by the Lick Observatory Supernova Search (LOSS) on 8 June 2006.
- SN 2016hvu (Type II-P, mag. 17.6) was discovered by the Catalina Real-time Transient Survey on 6 November 2016.

== See also ==
- List of NGC objects (7001–7840)
