= NGC 3437 =

Galaxy in the constellation Leo

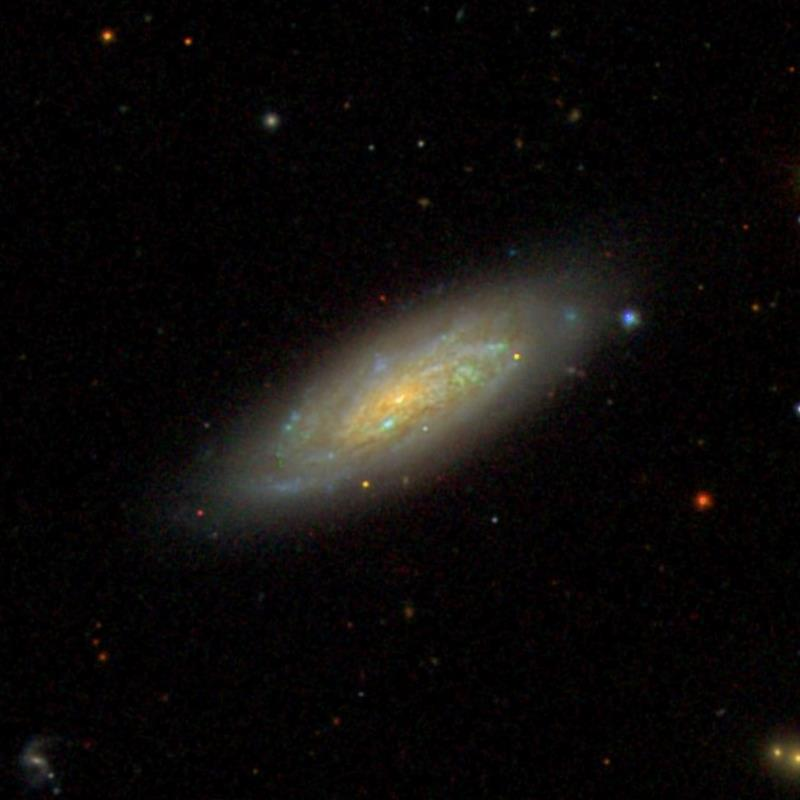
- NGC 3437 imaged by SDSS

Observation data (J2000 epoch)
- Constellation: Leo
- Right ascension: 10^{h} 52^{m} 35.7707^{s}
- Declination: +22° 56′ 02.477″
- Redshift: 0.004260±0.000009
- Heliocentric radial velocity: 1,277±3 km/s
- Distance: 79.12 ± 2.14 Mly (24.259 ± 0.656 Mpc)
- Apparent magnitude (V): 11.6B

Characteristics
- Type: SAB(rs)c
- Size: ~64,400 ly (19.76 kpc) (estimated)
- Apparent size (V): 2.5′ × 0.8′

Other designations
- IRAS 10498+2312, UGC 5995, MCG +04-26-016, PGC 32648, CGCG 125-013

NGC 3437 is a barred spiral galaxy in the constellation of Leo. Its velocity with respect to the cosmic microwave background is 1,597±23 km/s, which corresponds to a Hubble distance of 76.8 ± 5.5 Mly (23.56 ± 1.68 Mpc). Additionally, 17 non-redshift measurements give a similar mean distance of 79.12 ± 2.14 Mly (24.259 ± 0.656 Mpc). It was discovered by German-British astronomer William Herschel on 12 March 1784.

NGC 3437 is listed as a radio galaxy.

== Supernovae and luminous red nova ==
Two supernovae and one luminous red nova have been observed in NGC 3437:

- SN 2004bm (Type Ic, mag. 17.5) was discovered by the Lick Observatory Supernova Search (LOSS) on 25 April 2004.
- NGC 3437−2011OT1 (also named PSN J10523453+2256052 and SNhunt31) (Type LRN, mag. 18.4) was discovered by the Catalina Real-time Transient Survey on 10 January 2011. It was initially suspected of being a luminous blue variable, but later analysis concluded that it was a luminous red nova.
- SN 2026kie (Type Ic, mag. 18.086) was discovered by ATLAS on 22 April 2026. It had originally been classified as Type Ib, but later analysis concluded it to be Type Ic.

== See also ==
- List of NGC objects (3001–4000)
