= NGC 4615 =

Galaxy in the constellation Coma Berenices

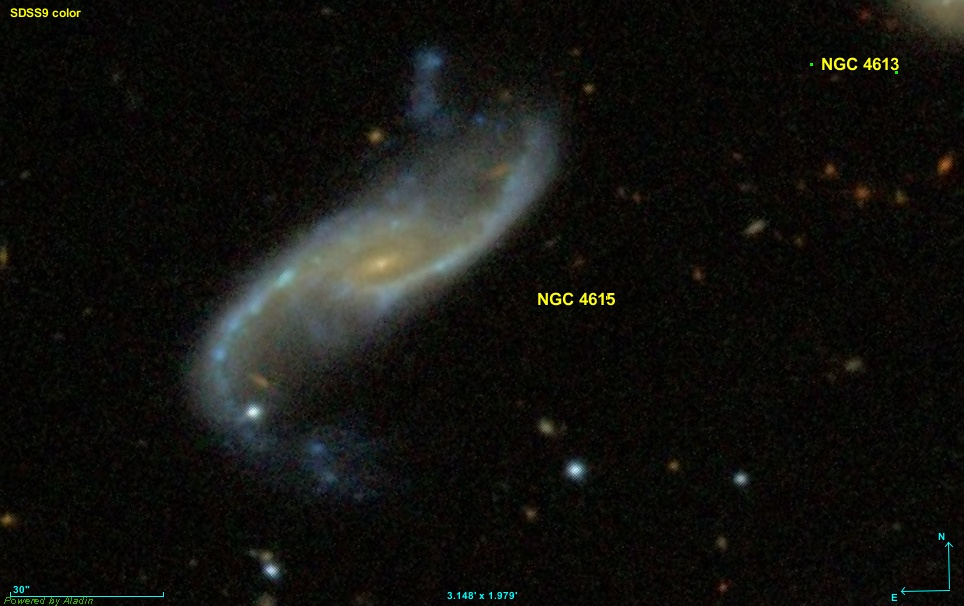
- NGC 4615 imaged by SDSS

Observation data (J2000 epoch)
- Constellation: Coma Berenices
- Right ascension: 12^{h} 41^{m} 37.3313^{s}
- Declination: +26° 04′ 21.871″
- Redshift: 0.015797±0.0000112
- Heliocentric radial velocity: 4,736±3 km/s
- Distance: 213 Mly (65.4 Mpc)
- Group or cluster: Holm 439
- Apparent magnitude (V): 13.84

Characteristics
- Type: Scd
- Size: ~160,400 ly (49.17 kpc) (estimated)
- Apparent size (V): 1.6′ × 0.7′

Other designations
- HOLM 439A, IRAS 12391+2620, 2MASX J12413730+2604223, Arp 34, UGC 7852, MCG +04-30-013, PGC 42584, CGCG 129-018

NGC 4615 is a spiral galaxy in the constellation of Coma Berenices. Its velocity with respect to the cosmic microwave background is 5,022±20 km/s, which corresponds to a Hubble distance of 241.6 ± 16.9 Mly (74.07 ± 5.19 Mpc). However, one non-redshift measurement gives a much closer distance of 213 Mly (65.4 Mpc). It was discovered by German astronomer Heinrich d'Arrest on 9 May 1864.

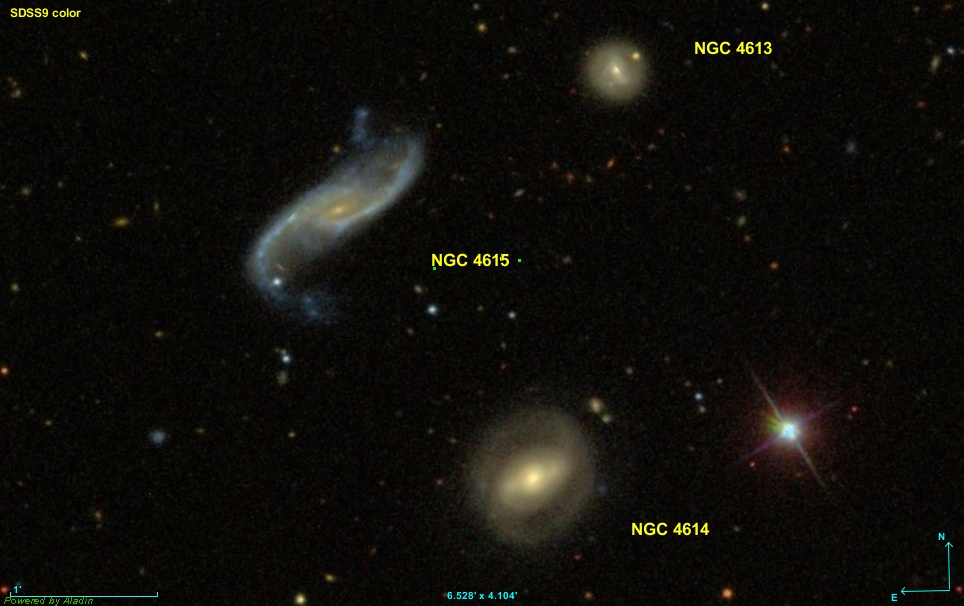
NGC 4615 and NGC 4614 imaged by SDSS

NGC 4615 is listed in Halton Arp's Atlas of Peculiar Galaxies as Arp 34, as an example of a galaxy that looks like a stretched-out S shape.

NGC 4615 and NGC 4614 are listed together as Holm 439 in Erik Holmberg's A Study of Double and Multiple Galaxies Together with Inquiries into some General Metagalactic Problems, published in 1937. This grouping was also listed by A. P. Mahtessian in a paper published in 1998.

== Supernovae ==
Two supernovae have been observed in NGC 4615:

- SN 1987F (Type II-P, mag. 15.8) was discovered independently by Natalya Metlova on 22 April 1987, and by Thomas Schildknecht on 23 April 1987.
- SN 2025nzi (Type Ib, mag. 19.016) was discovered by ATLAS on 18 June 2025.

== See also ==
- List of NGC objects (4001–5000)
