= NGC 5504 =

Spiral galaxy in the constellation Boötes

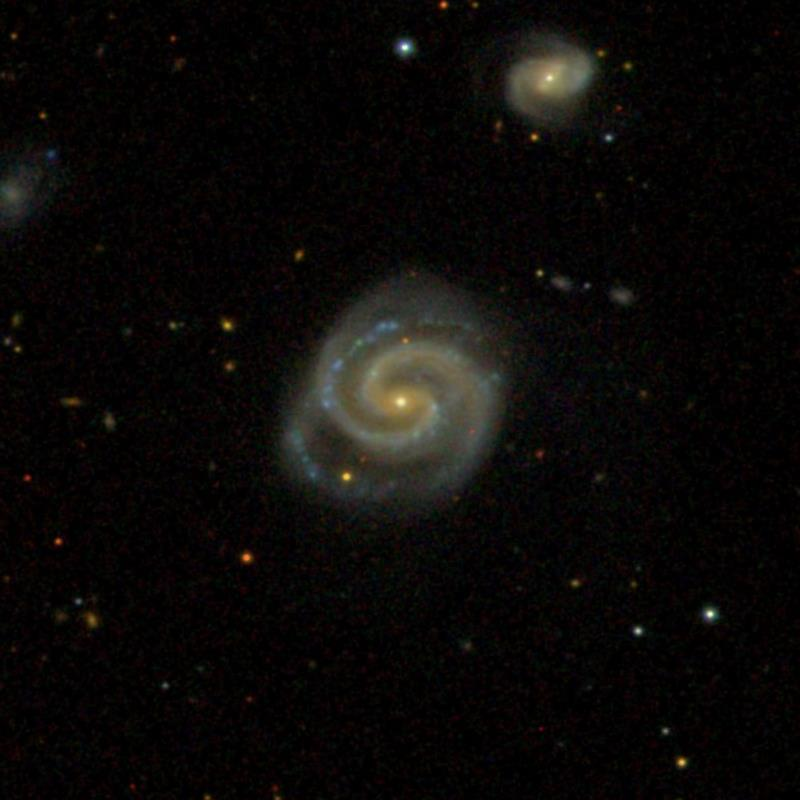
- As seen during the Sloan Digital Sky Survey

Observation data (J2000 epoch)
- Constellation: Bootes
- Right ascension: 14h 12m 15s
- Declination: +15° 50’ 30”
- Redshift: 0.017492
- Distance: 264 Mly (80.85 Mpc)
- Apparent magnitude (B): 13.9
- Surface brightness: 23.03 mag/arcsec2

Characteristics
- Type: SAbc

Other designations
- PGC 50718, UGC 9085, CGCG 103-114, MCG +03-36-081, KUG 1409+160

NGC 5504 is an intermediate barred spiral galaxy located in the constellation Boötes. Its speed relative to the cosmic microwave background is 5,482 ± 17 km/s, which corresponds to a Hubble distance of 80.9 ± 5.7 Mpc (∼264 million ly). NGC 5504 was discovered by French astronomer Édouard Stephan in 1880.

The luminosity class of NGC 5504 is II-III and it has a broad HI line.

== Supernova ==
Supernova SN 2013bb (Type IIb, mag. 18.4) was discovered in NGC 5504 on April 3, 2013, as part of Caltech's Catalina Real-Time Transient Survey (CRTS) and by Stan Howerton.

== NGC 5504 group ==
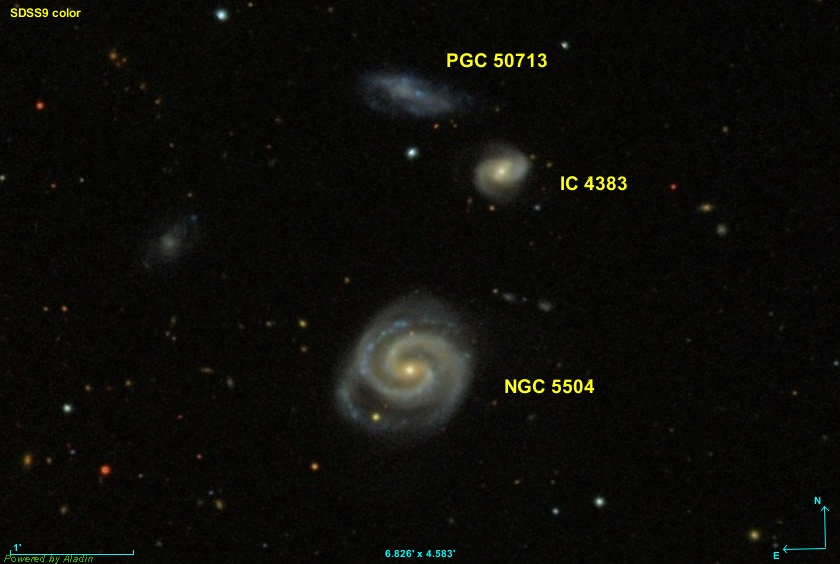
NGC 5504 Group. Two of the galaxies can be seen above NGC 5504.

The galaxies IC 4383 and PGC 50713 are located in the same region of the sky as NGC 5504 and their radial speed respectively equal to (5,230 ± 4) km/s and (5,249 ± 6) km/s places them approximately at the same distance as NGC 5504. These three galaxies therefore form a triplet of galaxies, the group of NGC 5504, the brightest of the three galaxies.

This group of galaxies is designated as WBL 494 in the article by White published in 1999. IC 4383 is also designated as NGC 5504B and as WBL 494–001 by the NASA/IPAC database while PGC 50713 is designated as NGC 5504C and as WBL 494–003.

== See also ==
- List of NGC objects (5001–6000)
