= NGC 2272 =

Lenticular galaxy

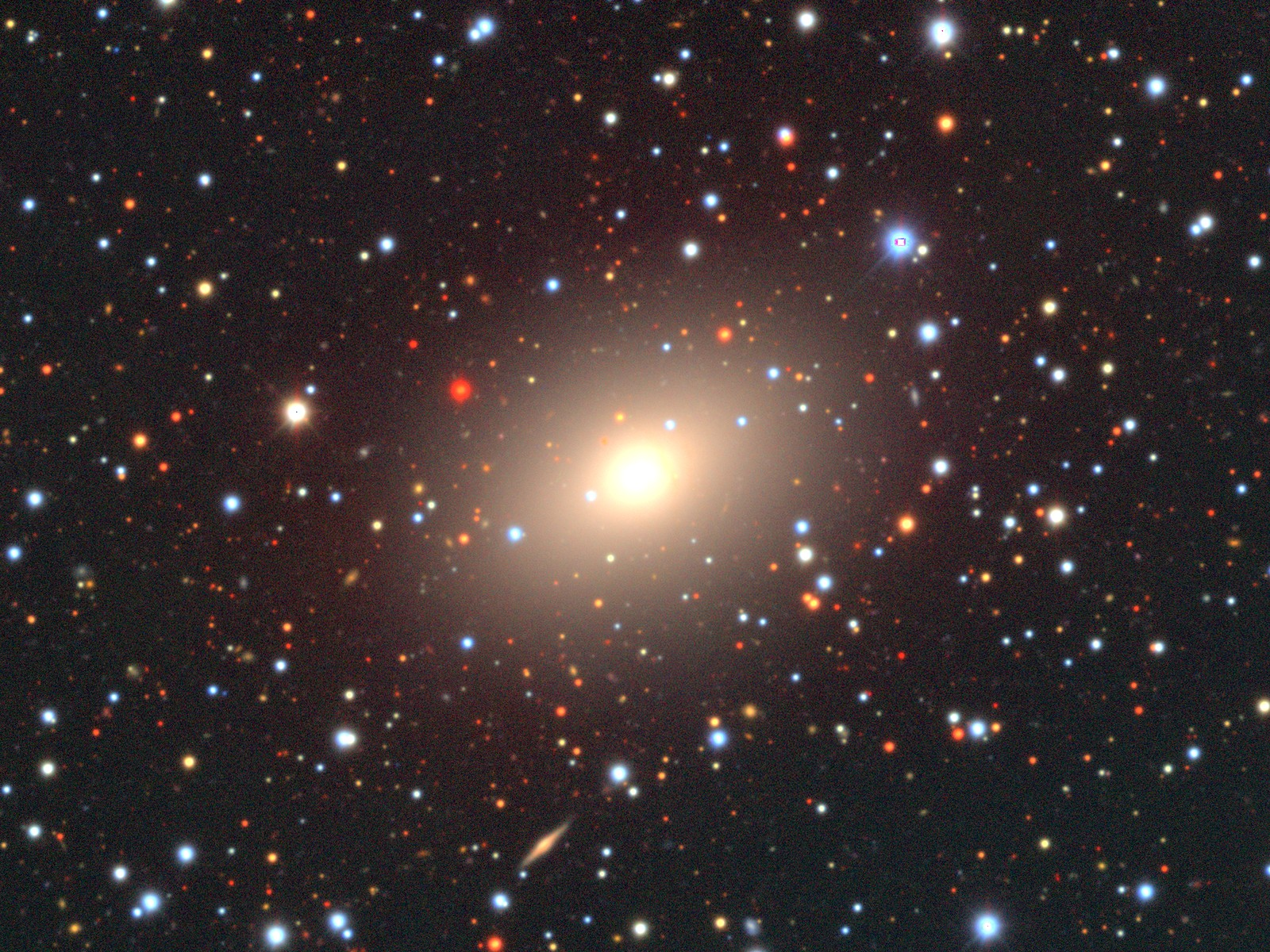
- NGC 2272 imaged by Legacy Surveys

Observation data
- Constellation: Canis Major
- Right ascension: 06^{h} 42^{m} 41.6^{s}
- Declination: −27° 27′ 31″
- Distance: 95.3 Mly (29.23 Mpc)
- Apparent magnitude (V): 11.88
- Apparent magnitude (B): 12.85

Characteristics
- Type: S0
- Apparent size (V): 2.344′ × 1.584′
- Notable features: Position angle (PA): 123°

Other designations
- AM 0640-272, ESO 490-33, LEDA 19466, MCG-05-16-017, SGC 064042-2724.5, h 3061, GC 1447

NGC 2272 is a lenticular galaxy in the constellation Canis Major. It was discovered on 20 January 1835 by the British astronomer John Herschel.

== Supernova ==
One supernova has been observed in NGC 2272: SN 2012hn (Type Ic-pec, mag. 16.5) was discovered by the Catalina Real-time Transient Survey and Stan Howerton on 4 April 2012.
