= UGC 11241 =

Galaxy in the constellation Dorado

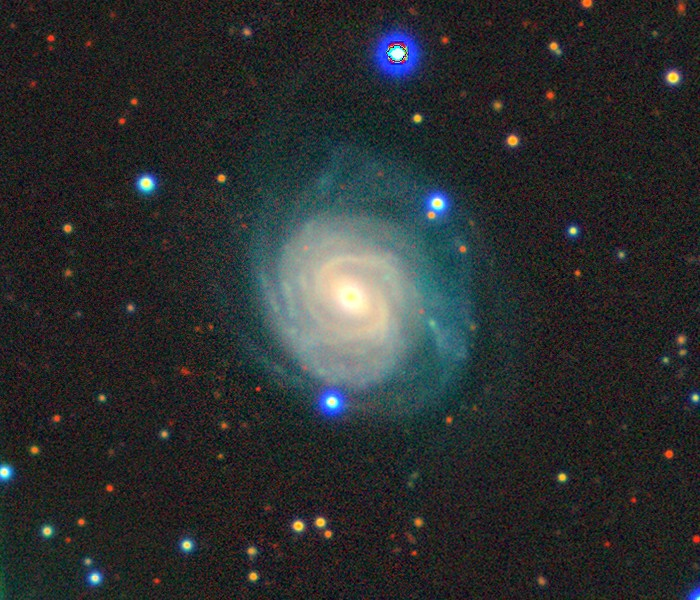
- UGC 11241 imaged by Legacy Surveys

Observation data (J2000 epoch)
- Constellation: Draco
- Right ascension: 18^{h} 26^{m} 49.8934^{s}
- Declination: +51° 08′ 21.327″
- Redshift: 0.032663±0.0000444
- Heliocentric radial velocity: 9,792±13 km/s
- Distance: 465.8 ± 32.6 Mly (142.81 ± 10.00 Mpc)
- Group or cluster: [CHM2007] LDC 1304
- Apparent magnitude (V): 14.90

Characteristics
- Type: Sb
- Size: ~238,100 ly (72.99 kpc) (estimated)
- Apparent size (V): 1.0′ × 0.9′

Other designations
- 2MASS J18264983+5108210, MCG +09-30-014, PGC 61883, CGCG 279-012

UGC 11241 is a spiral galaxy in the constellation of Draco. Its velocity with respect to the cosmic microwave background is 9,683±15 km/s, which corresponds to a Hubble distance of 465.8 ± 32.6 Mly (142.81 ± 10.00 Mpc). The first known reference to this galaxy comes from Part 1 of the Morphological Catalogue of Galaxies, where it is listed as MCG +09-30-014.

== LDC 1304 Group ==
UGC 11241 is a member of a small group of galaxies known as [CHM2007] LDC 1304. The other two galaxies in the group are UGC 11255 and CGCG 279-018.

== Supernovae ==
Four supernovae have been observed in UGC 11241:

- SN 2005cy (Type IIn, mag. 17.9) was discovered by A. Sehgal, Jack Newton, and Tim Puckett, as part of the Puckett Observatory Supernova Search, on 15 July 2005.
- SN 2008bw (Type Ia, mag. 18.0) was discovered by E. Guido, W. MacDonald and Tim Puckett on 21 April 2008.
- SN 2018aqf (Type Ib, mag. 18.9) was discovered by the Catalina Real-time Transient Survey on 5 April 2018.
- SN 2025acrb (Type II, mag. 19.5865) was discovered by the Zwicky Transient Facility on 30 October 2025.
