= NGC 3106 =

Galaxy in the constellation Leo Minor

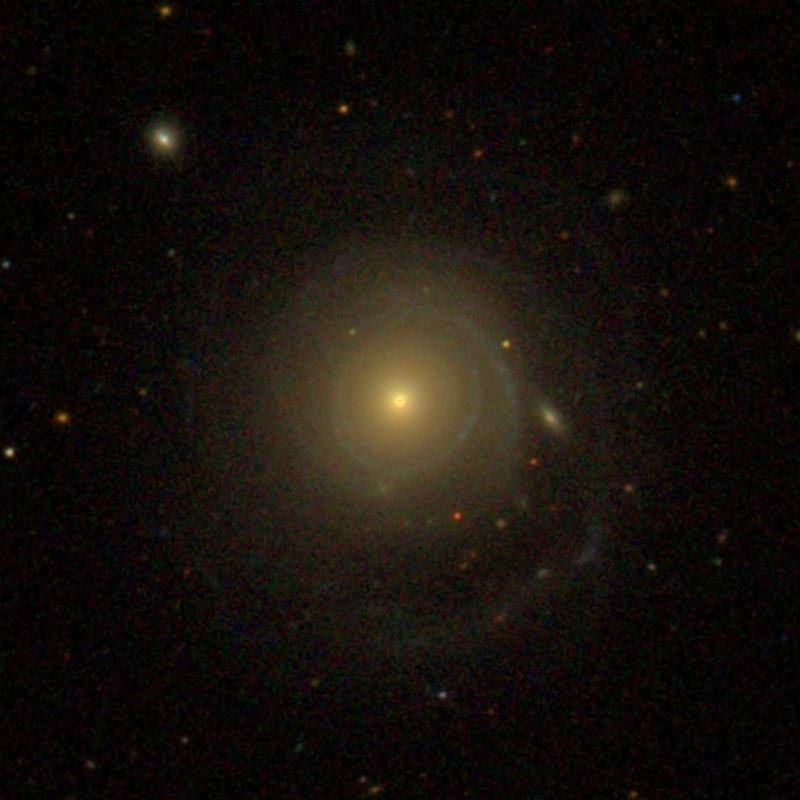
- NGC 3106 imaged by Sloan Digital Sky Survey

Observation data (J2000 epoch)
- Constellation: Leo Minor
- Right ascension: 10^{h} 04^{m} 05.2636^{s}
- Declination: +31° 11′ 07.756″
- Redshift: 0.020654 ± 0.000007
- Heliocentric radial velocity: 6,192 ± 2 km/s
- Distance: 293 ± 21 Mly (89.9 ± 6.3 Mpc)
- Apparent magnitude (V): 12.3

Characteristics
- Type: S0
- Size: ~103,000 ly (31.7 kpc) (estimated)
- Apparent size (V): 1.43′ × 1.12′

Other designations
- IRAS F10012+3125, UGC 5419, MCG +05-24-009, PGC 29196, CGCG 153-013

NGC 3106 is a lenticular galaxy in the constellation Leo Minor. The galaxy lies about 290 million light years away from Earth, which means, given its apparent dimensions, that NGC 3106 is approximately 100,000 light years across. It was discovered by William Herschel on March 13, 1785.

== Characteristics ==
The galaxy is characterised as a lenticular galaxy, having a disk and a bulge. Almost 95% of the stars in the bulge are old, created more than 6 billion years ago, while the stars in the disk are younger, as 77% are older than 6 billion years. Its nucleus is active and based on its emission is characterised as a LINER. There is also some star formation taking place at the central region of the galaxy disk, but not in the bulge. The star formation at the centre of the galaxy could be the result of tidal interaction.

The outer regions of the galaxy feature faint structures that resemble spiral arms. Although otherwise faint, they are the source of more than half of the H-alpha emission of the galaxy. HII regions have been detected in these spiral features, indicating they are locations of active star formation. The star formation rate is estimated to be 0.1–0.3 M_{☉} per year. The innermost star formation ring has a radius of 20 arcseconds while the galaxy has a series of rings.

== Supernovae ==
Four supernovae have been discovered in NGC 3106:

- SN 1983J (type unknown, mag. 16.0) was discovered by Russian astronomer Natalya Metlova on 8 April 1983.
- SN 2009gt (type unknown, mag. 16.1) was discovered by the Catalina Real-time Transient Survey on 25 June 2009.
- SN 2021aewn (Type II, mag. 18.658) was discovered by ATLAS on 18 November 2021.
- SN 2025aauj (Type Ia, mag. 17.6858) was discovered by the Zwicky Transient Facility on 18 October 2025.

== Nearby galaxies ==
NGC 3106 is a field galaxy, meaning it doesn't belong in a galaxy group. Seven dwarf companion galaxies have been found in its vicinity. Other nearby galaxies include NGC 3116 and UGC 5481.
