= NGC 7321 =

Galaxy in the constellation Pegasus

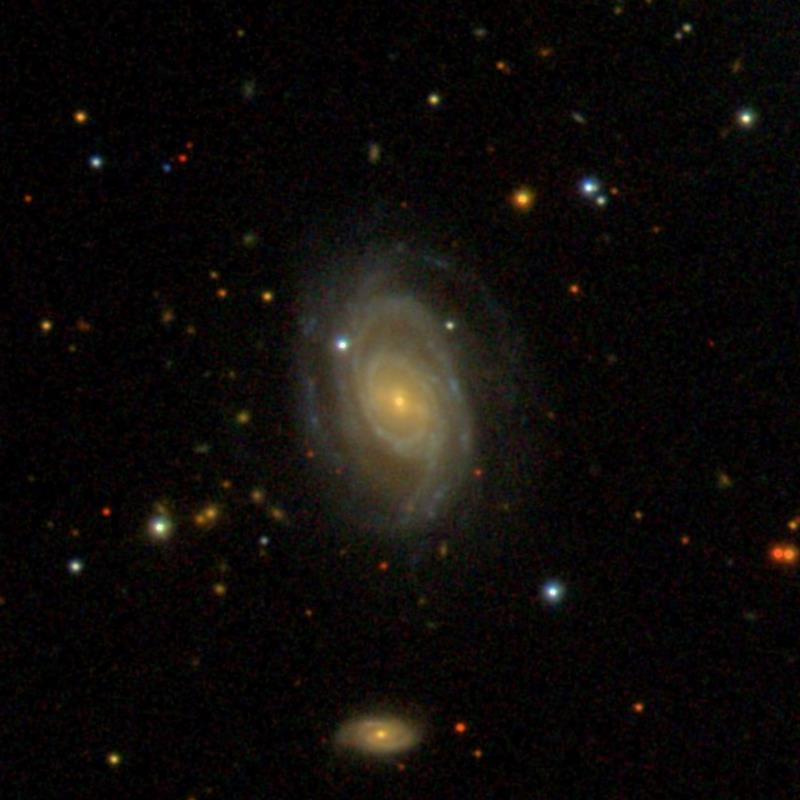
- NGC 7321 imaged by SDSS

Observation data (J2000 epoch)
- Constellation: Pegasus
- Right ascension: 22^{h} 36^{m} 28.0108^{s}
- Declination: +21° 37′ 18.648″
- Redshift: 0.023843±0.0000120
- Heliocentric radial velocity: 7,148±4 km/s
- Distance: 297.50 ± 14.14 Mly (91.214 ± 4.334 Mpc)
- Apparent magnitude (V): 13.71

Characteristics
- Type: SB(r)b
- Size: ~147,100 ly (45.11 kpc) (estimated)
- Apparent size (V): 1.6′ × 1.1′

Other designations
- HOLM 793A, IRAS 22340+2121, 2MASX J22362802+2137186, UGC 12103, MCG +03-57-021, PGC 69287, CGCG 452-031

NGC 7321 is a barred spiral galaxy in the constellation of Pegasus. Its velocity with respect to the cosmic microwave background is 6,793±25 km/s, which corresponds to a Hubble distance of 326.8 ± 22.9 Mly (100.19 ± 7.02 Mpc). However, seven non-redshift measurements give a closer mean distance of 297.50 ± 14.14 Mly (91.214 ± 4.334 Mpc). It was discovered by German-British astronomer William Herschel on 17 November 1784.

NGC 7321 is a LINER galaxy, i.e. a galaxy whose nucleus has an emission spectrum characterized by broad lines of weakly ionized atoms.

== Galaxy group ==
According to M. J. Geller and J. P. Huchra, NGC 7321 is a member of a galaxy group which contains two other galaxies: NGC 7316 and NGC 7323.

== Supernovae ==
Two supernovae have been observed in NGC 7321:

- SN 2008gj (Type Ic, mag. 18.2) was discovered by the Lick Observatory Supernova Search (LOSS) on 19 October 2008.
- SN 2013di (Type Ia, mag. 18.2) was discovered by the Catalina Real-time Transient Survey on 12 June 2013.

== See also ==
- List of NGC objects (7001–7840)
