= NGC 4593 =

Galaxy in the constellation of Virgo

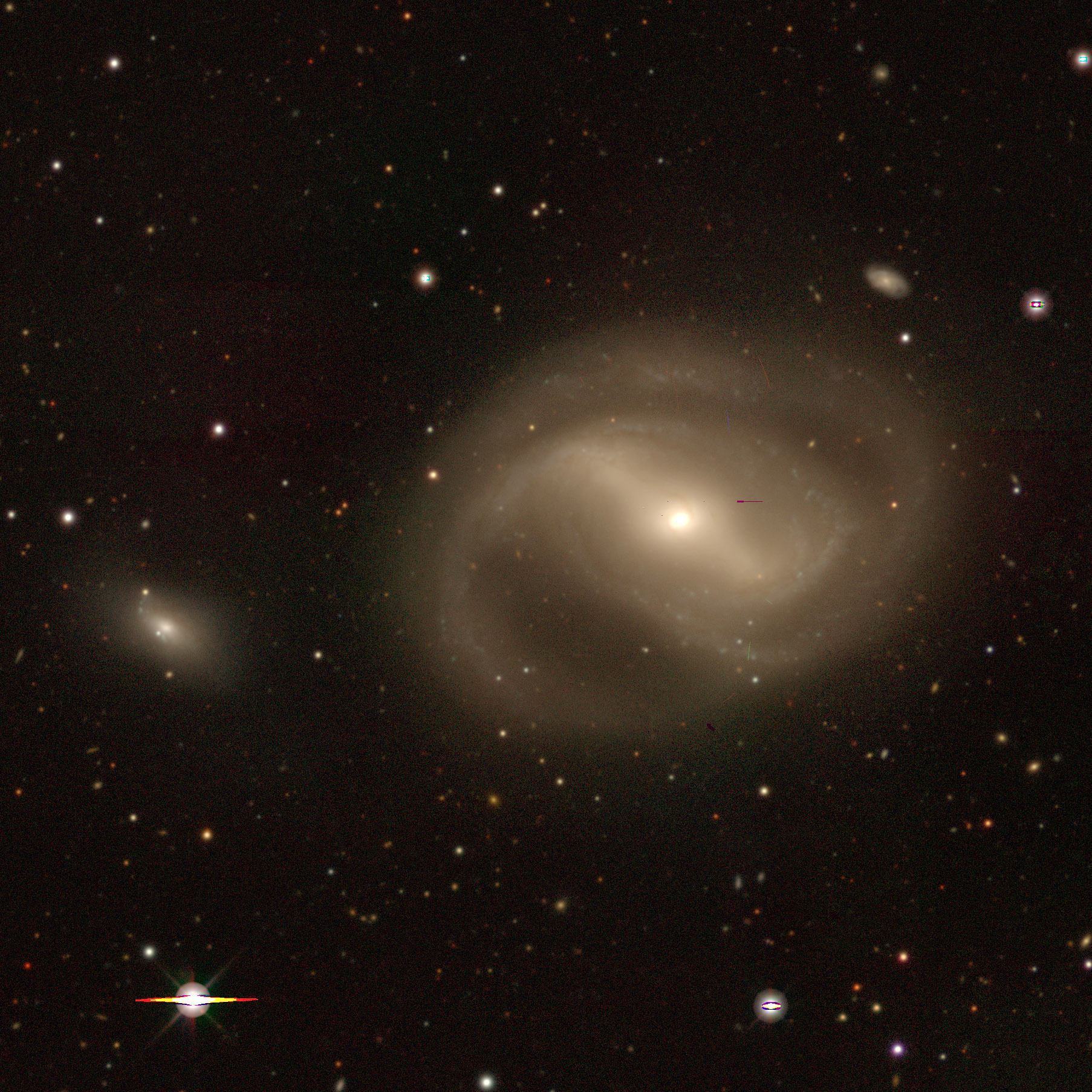
- NGC 4593 (right) and MCG-01-32-033 by legacy surveys

Observation data (J2000 epoch)
- Constellation: Virgo
- Right ascension: 12^{h} 39^{m} 39.4^{s}
- Declination: −05° 20′ 39″
- Redshift: 0.008312 ± 0.000020
- Heliocentric radial velocity: 2,492 ± 6 km/s
- Distance: 120 ± 57 Mly (34.3 ± 16.8 Mpc)
- Apparent magnitude (V): 11.67

Characteristics
- Type: (R)SB(rs)b
- Apparent size (V): 3.9′ × 2.9′
- Notable features: Seyfert galaxy

Other designations
- MRK 1330, MCG -01-32-032, PGC 42375

NGC 4593 is a barred spiral galaxy located in the constellation Virgo. It is located at a distance of about 120 million light years from Earth, which, given its apparent dimensions, means that NGC 4593 is about 125,000 light years across.

It was discovered by William Herschel on April 17, 1784. It is a Seyfert galaxy.

== Characteristics ==
NGC 4593 is a barred spiral galaxy with a nearly complete ring. The galaxy has a large elliptical/boxy pseudobulge with the bar emerging from its northeast and southwest corner. From its end of the bar begin two diffuse smooth spiral arms that can be traced for about half a revolution. At the south part of the ring there could emerge a third, smaller spiral arm. One arm emerges from the ring at one end of the bar while a second emerges about 15 degrees before the other end.

=== Active nucleus ===
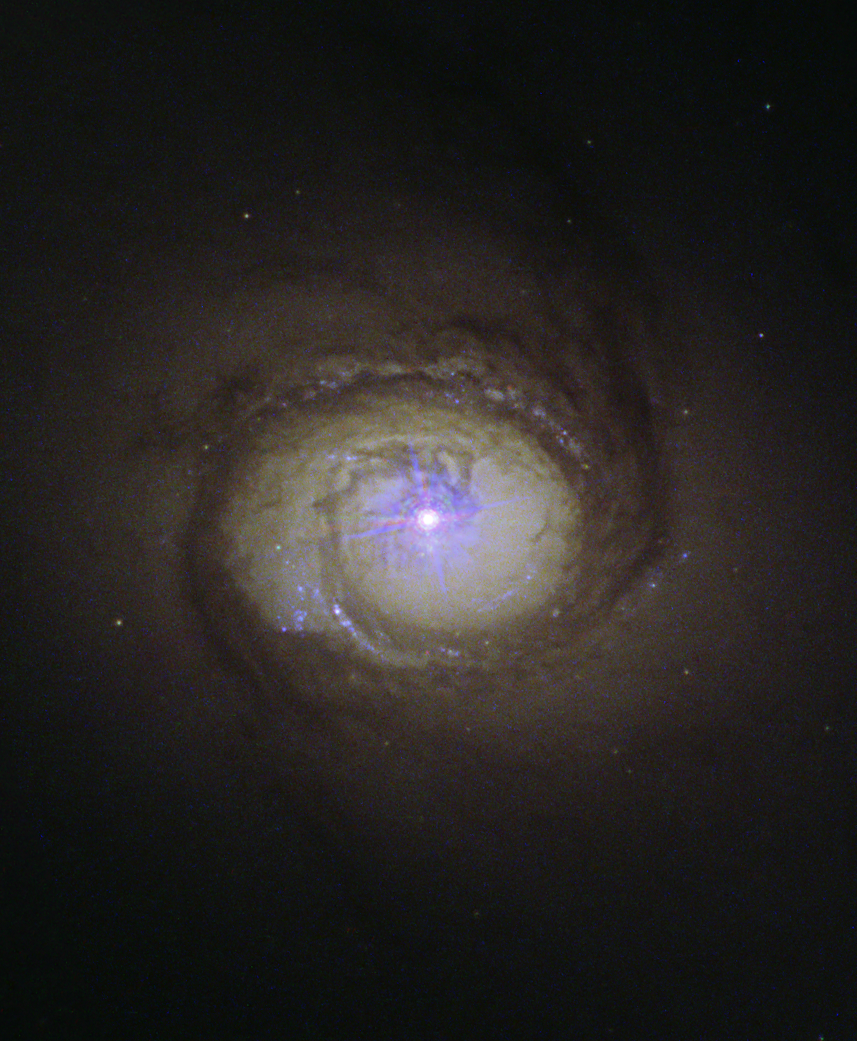
The central region of NGC 4593 by the Hubble Space Telescope.

The nucleus of NGC 4593 has been found to be active and it has been categorised as a type I Seyfert galaxy. The most accepted theory for the energy source of active galactic nuclei is the presence of an accretion disk around a supermassive black hole. The mass of the black hole in the centre of NGC 4593 is estimated to be (9.8±2.1)×10^{6} M_{☉} based on reverberation mapping or (5.8±2.1)×10^{6} M_{☉} based on X-ray flux variations.

The nucleus has been found to be a bright X-rays source. The source is variable both in flux and spectrum, varying at a timescale of few kiloseconds. The changes in the X-ray band are followed by variations in the ultraviolet and visual light band, with the lag being 1.3 ± 0.5 days in the V-band. The X-rays observations by Chandra X-ray Observatory indicate the presence of a warm absorber and outflows of ionised gas that are generated at different distances from the nucleus. The overall X-ray spectrum indicates the presence of a hot corona, which generates the hard X-rays, and a warm medium, which is responsible for the soft X-rays excess.

A circumnuclear dust ring with a radius of 5 arcseconds that is connected with the dust lanes in the bar of the galaxy is seen in visible light. Similar rings in other galaxies have been found to exhibit intense star formation, but that isn't the case with NGC 4593, indicating that starburst activity is episodic. Inside the ring lies a single spiral arm and no other dust features.

== Nearby galaxies ==
NGC 4593 is the foremost galaxy in a galaxy group known as the NGC 4593 Group. Other members of the group the spiral galaxy NGC 4602 and the smaller galaxies MCG-01-32-37, MGC-01-32-33, SVEN 314, and SVEN 328. Markarov et al. consider NGC 4604 to be a member of this group as well. SVEN 314 is a dwarf galaxy which lies at a projected distance of 22 kpc and is the closest galaxy to NGC 4593. There are evidence that NGC 4593 is interacting with MGC-01-32-33, which lies about two disk radii away, as the spiral pattern is slightly distorted towards the direction of that galaxy, possibly as a result of tidal forces.

Other galaxies near the NGC 4593 Group include UGC 7798 and its group, IC 804, NGC 4626, NGC 4628, and NGC 4671. These galaxies were considered to be part of the Virgo II Groups, but that isn't accepted anymore, and they are considered to lie between the Local Supercluster and Hydra-Centaurus Supercluster, with the group still being within the Local Supercluster.
