= NGC 4185 =

Galaxy in the constellation Coma Berenices

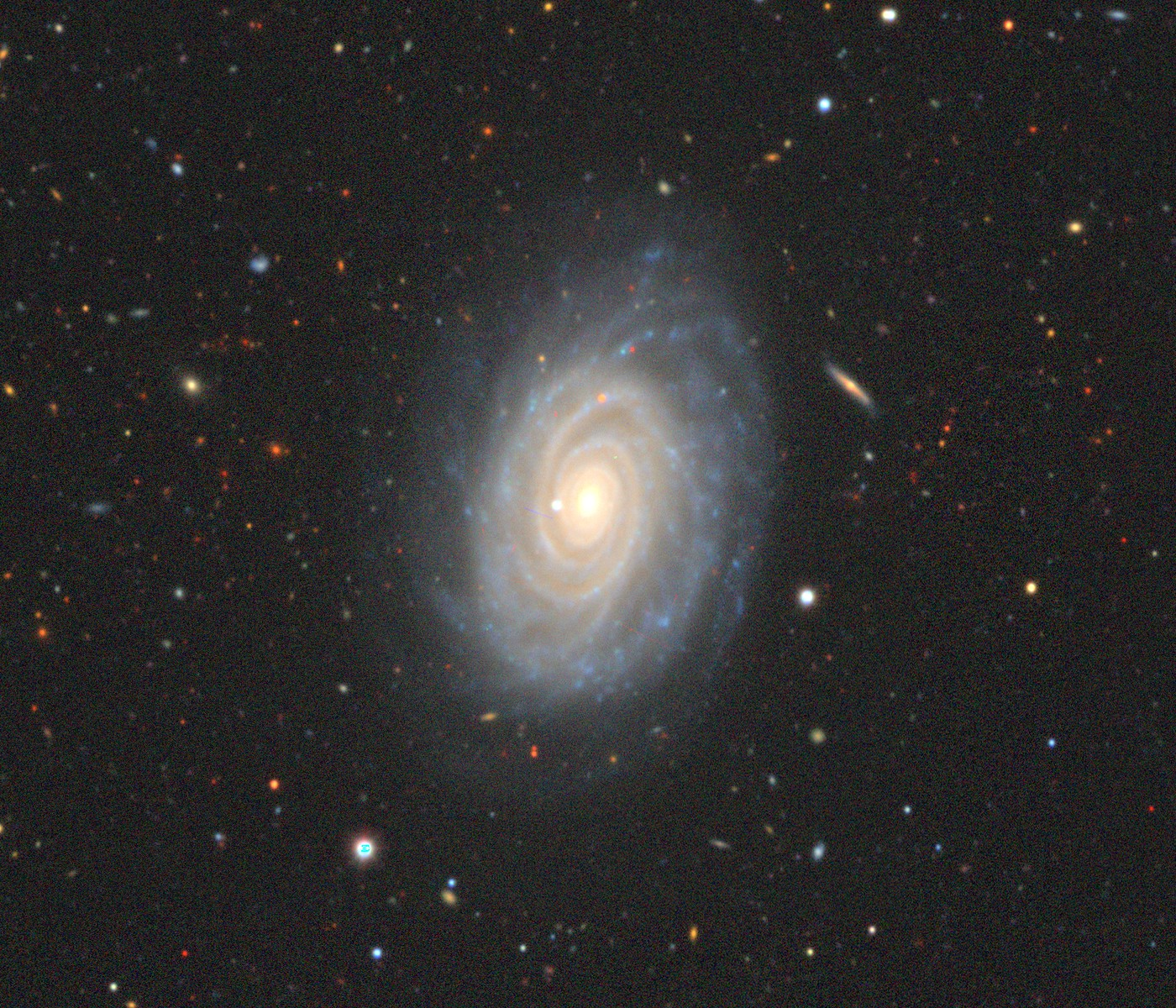
- NGC 4185 imaged by Legacy Surveys

Observation data (J2000 epoch)
- Constellation: Coma Berenices
- Right ascension: 12^{h} 13^{m} 22.2035^{s}
- Declination: +28° 30′ 39.600″
- Redshift: 0.012968±0.0000124
- Heliocentric radial velocity: 3,888±4 km/s
- Distance: 214.61 ± 0.33 Mly (65.800 ± 0.100 Mpc)
- Group or cluster: NGC 4185 group (LGG 276)
- Apparent magnitude (V): 12.90

Characteristics
- Type: Sbc
- Size: ~181,000 ly (55.51 kpc) (estimated)
- Apparent size (V): 2.6′ × 1.9′

Other designations
- IRAS F12107+2847, 2MASX J12132220+2830393, UGC 7225, MCG +05-29-038, PGC 38995, CGCG 158-047

NGC 4185 is a large spiral galaxy in the constellation of Coma Berenices. Its velocity with respect to the cosmic microwave background is 4,178±21 km/s, which corresponds to a Hubble distance of 201.0 ± 14.1 Mly (61.63 ± 4.33 Mpc). Additionally, three non-redshift measurements give a farther mean distance of 214.61 ± 0.33 Mly (65.800 ± 0.100 Mpc). It was discovered by German-British astronomer William Herschel on 11 April 1785.

NGC 4195 is a LINER galaxy, i.e. a galaxy whose nucleus has an emission spectrum characterized by broad lines of weakly ionized atoms.

== NGC 4185 group ==
NGC 4185 is a member of a galaxy group that bears its name. The NGC 4185 group (also known as LGG 276) has 13 galaxies, including NGC 4131, NGC 4132, NGC 4134, NGC 4169, NGC 4174, NGC 4175, NGC 4196, NGC 4253, MCG +05-29-024, MCG +05-29-035, UGC 7221, and UGC 7294.

== Supernova ==
One supernova has been observed in NGC 4185:

- SN 1982C (type unknown, mag. 17.5) was discovered by Hungarian astronomer Miklós Lovas on 22 March 1982.

== See also ==
- List of NGC objects (4001–5000)
