= NGC 4626 =

Galaxy in the constellation Virgo

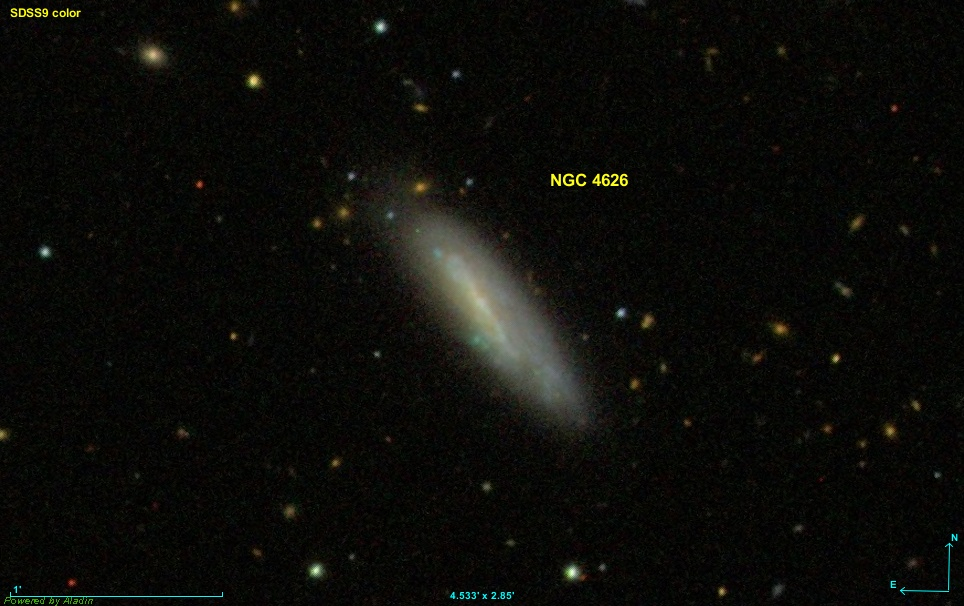
- NGC 4626 imaged by SDSS

Observation data (J2000 epoch)
- Constellation: Virgo
- Right ascension: 12^{h} 42^{m} 25.3^{s}
- Declination: −07° 02′ 38″
- Redshift: 0.00938
- Heliocentric radial velocity: 2882 km/s
- Distance: 156 Mly (47.7 Mpc)

Characteristics
- Type: SBbc

Other designations
- MCG -01-32-040, 2MFGC 09997, 2MASX J12422507-0702456, 2MASX J12422554-0702364

NGC 4626 is a barred spiral galaxy located in the constellation Virgo, approximately 156 Million light-years from Earth. It is part of the Virgo Cluster and was discovered by William Herschel on March 20, 1789, and later observed by John Herschel.>

Wolfgang Steinicke and Professor Seligman classify this galaxy as an ordinary spiral, but the bar is clearly visible in the SDSS survey image. The luminosity class of NGC 4626 is II-III.

== Supernova ==
One supernova has been observed in NGC 4626. SN 2012cr (Type II, mag. 18.3) was discovered by the Caltech Institute's Catalina Real-time Transient Survey (CRTS) on March 25, 2012.

== See also ==
- NGC
- List of NGC objects (4001-5000)
- List of NGC objects
- Galaxy
