= NGC 4614 =

Galaxy in the constellation Coma Berenices

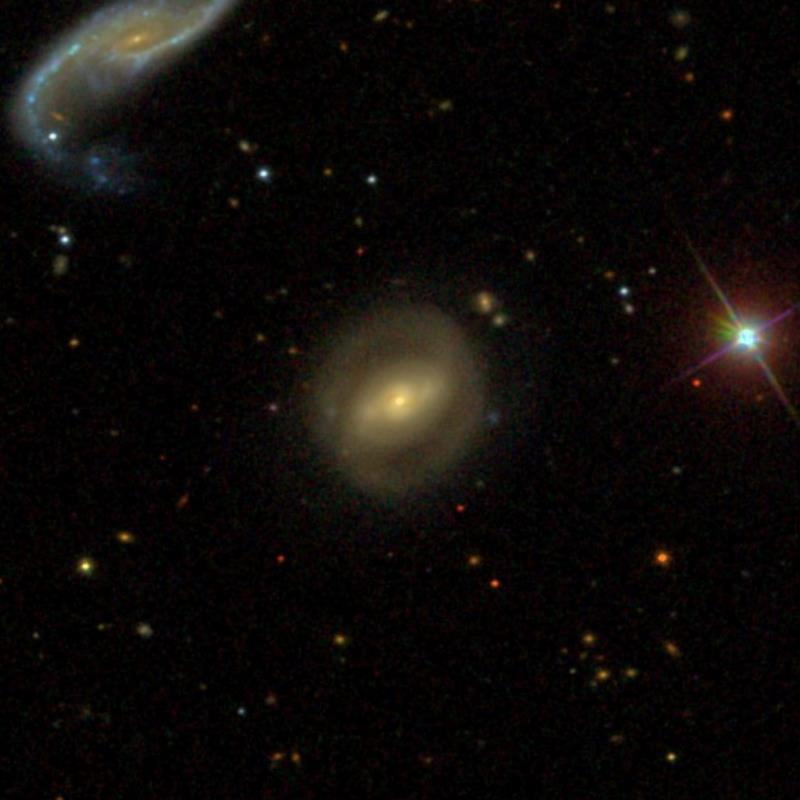
- SDSS image of NGC 4614

Observation data (J2000 epoch)
- Constellation: Coma Berenices
- Right ascension: 12^{h} 41^{m} 31.46397^{s}
- Declination: +26° 02′ 33.6235″
- Redshift: 0.01594
- Heliocentric radial velocity: 4741 km/s
- Distance: 234.9 Mly (72.03 Mpc)
- Apparent magnitude (B): 14.2

Characteristics
- Type: SB0/a

Other designations
- UGC 7851, MCG +04-30-012, PGC 42573

NGC 4614 is a barred lenticular galaxy in the New General Catalog. It is located in the constellation of Coma Berenices. It was discovered on 9 May 1864 by German astronomer Heinrich d'Arrest, with a 11.9 inch (11 inch) diameter lens type telescope.

== Supernova ==
One supernova has been observed in NGC 4614: SN 2018ata (Type Ia, mag. 20.1) was discovered by Mirco Villi and the Catalina Real-time Transient Survey on 10 April 2018.
