= NGC 5506 =

Galaxy in the constellation of Virgo

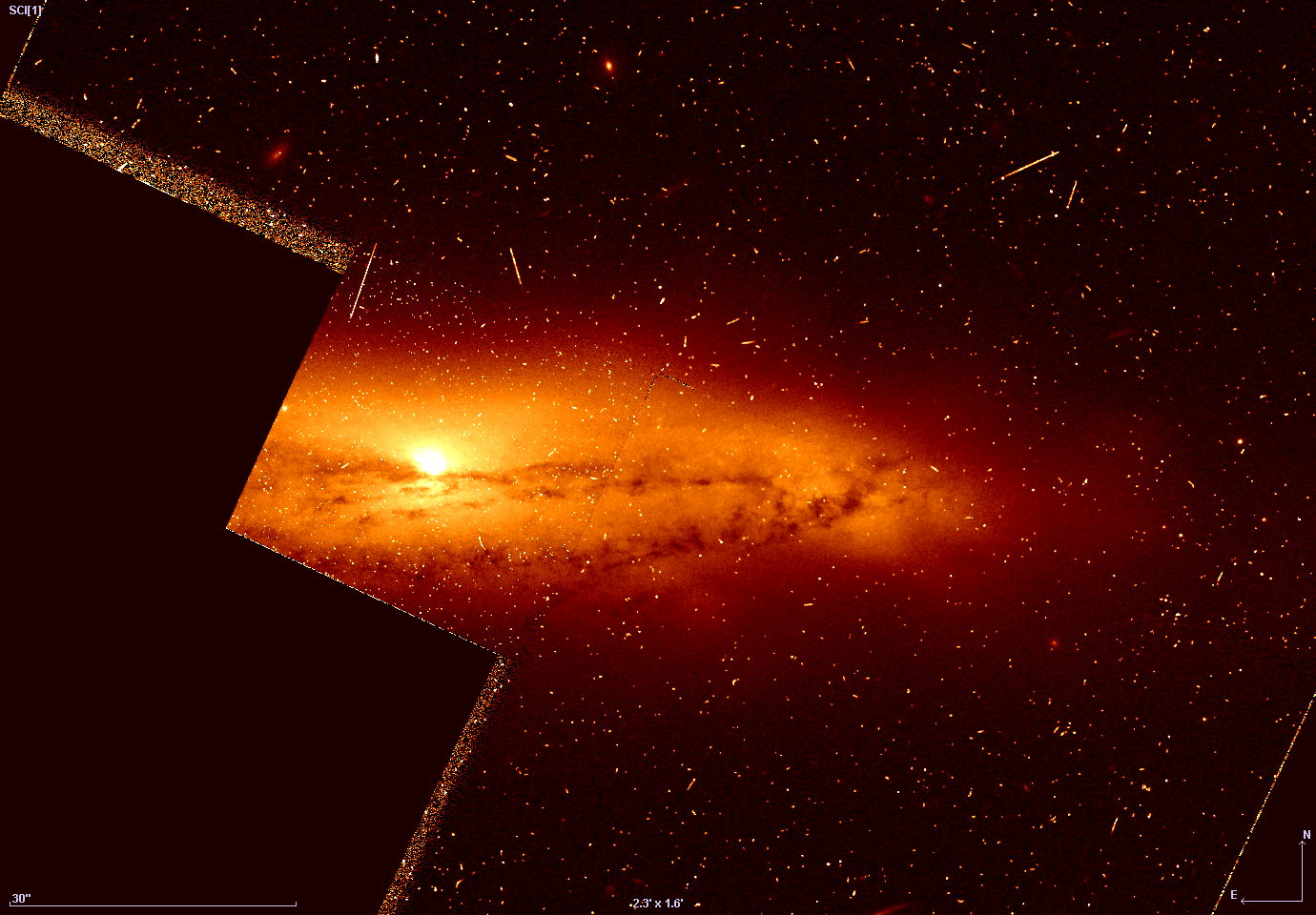
- NGC 5506 by the Hubble Space Telescope

Observation data (J2000 epoch)
- Constellation: Virgo
- Right ascension: 14^{h} 13^{m} 14.9^{s}
- Declination: −03° 12′ 27″
- Redshift: 0.006084 ± 0.000009
- Heliocentric radial velocity: 1,824 ± 3 km/s
- Distance: 77 ± 15 Mly (23.6 ± 4.6 Mpc)
- Apparent magnitude (V): 11.9

Characteristics
- Type: Sa pec sp
- Apparent size (V): 3.16′ × 0.75′
- Notable features: Seyfert galaxy

Other designations
- UGCΑ 387, MRK 1376, MCG +00-36-028, PGC 50782

NGC 5506 is a spiral galaxy located in the constellation Virgo. It is located at a distance of about 75 million light years from Earth, which, given its apparent dimensions, means that NGC 5506 is about 80,000 light years across. It was discovered by William Herschel on April 15, 1787. It is a Seyfert galaxy.

== Characteristics ==
NGC 5506 is a spiral galaxy seen edge-on, with dust lanes visible south of the nucleus.

=== Active nucleus ===
The nucleus of NGC 5506 has been found to be active and it has been categorised as a narrow line type I Seyfert galaxy, and is the brightest such nucleus. The classification of the active nucleus had been an issue of debate, as it lacked broad emission lines in the visual wavelength. However, broader lines were observed in the infrared, indicating that the broad line region is obscured in visual light.

The most accepted theory for the energy source of active galactic nuclei is the presence of an accretion disk around a supermassive black hole. The mass of the black hole in the centre of NGC 5506 is estimated to be 8.8×10^{7} M_{☉} based on stellar velocity dispersion and 5.1×10^{6} M_{☉} based on the M_{BH}–σ⋆ relation and X-ray variability.

NGC 5506 is a bright X-ray source, detected by all X-ray space observatories, starting with Uhuru. The X-ray spectrum indicates that there is both a compton-thick and a compton-thin absorber. The compton-thick absorber is a dust torus around the supermassive black hole at a distance of around one parsec, while the compton thin absorbs the softer X-rays emitted by the nucleus. The soft emission by the nucleus extends to a distance of about 350 pc and is attributed to reflection of the nuclear emission by photoionized gas. The inclination of the accretion disk is estimated to be between 40° and 50°. The iron line is complex, indicating emission by neutral and ionised iron. A broad component of the Fe Kα fluorescent emission line was observed by XMM-Newton.

The galaxy also emits radiowaves. The galaxy exhibits a central source that accounts for 75% of the total emission and diffuse wing-like emission towards the north-west and east of the nucleus and a low-surface-brightness halo measuring 2.75 arcseconds in diameter that surrounds these features. The features have no clear axis of symmetry. The galaxy has been found to host an H_{2}O megamaser.

== Nearby galaxies ==
NGC 5506 is the foremost galaxy in a galaxy group known as the NGC 5506 Group. Other members of the group include NGC 5507, while IC 978 lies a bit farther away. Garcia identified as members of group also the galaxies NGC 5496, and UGC 9057. NGC 5506 forms a pair with NGC 5507, which lies 4 arcminutes from it. The group is part of the Virgo III Groups, a very obvious chain of galaxy groups on the left side of the Virgo cluster, stretching across 40 million light years of space.
