= Catalina Real-time Transient Survey =

Sky survey

- Alternative names: CRTS

The Catalina Real-Time Transient Survey is a collaboration using three telescopes looking for optical transients. The same telescopes are used as in the Catalina Sky Survey. They are Mt. Lemmon Survey, Catalina Sky Survey, and Siding Spring Survey. When transients are detected they are alerted on a short time scale so that others can observe the event as well using VOEventNet and SkyAlert. It has detected supernovae, cataclysmic variables, blazars, active galactic nuclei and flares.

Astronomers have observed the most powerful and distant black hole flare ever recorded nicknamed “Superman”. The flare took place 10 billion light years away and was as bright as 10 trillion suns. Astronomers said the flare happened because there was a tidal disruption event. A supermassive black hole about 500 million times the mass of the sun is tearing and consuming a massive star at least 30 solar masses.
