= NGC 4634 =

Galaxy in the constellation Coma Berenices

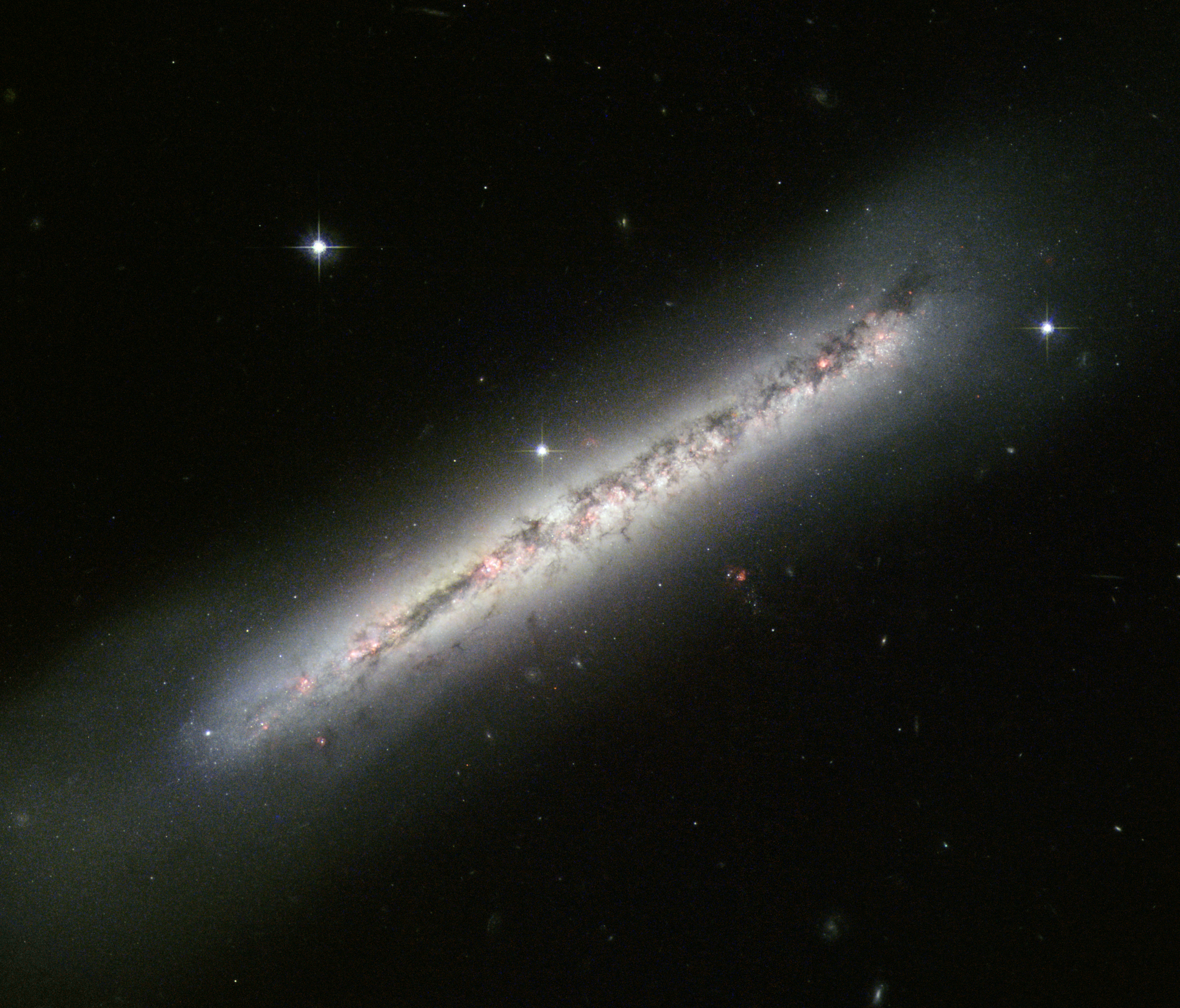
- Picture of NGC 4634 produced by the Hubble Space Telescope's Advanced Camera for Surveys and the Wide Field and Planetary Camera 2

Observation data (J2000 epoch)
- Constellation: Coma Berenices
- Right ascension: 12^{h} 42^{m} 40.986^{s}
- Declination: +14° 17′ 45.15″
- Redshift: 0.000991
- Heliocentric radial velocity: 297
- Group or cluster: Virgo Cluster
- Apparent magnitude (V): 11.67
- Apparent magnitude (B): 13.6
- Absolute magnitude (V): -17.96

Characteristics
- Type: SBcd
- Size: 49,800 ly (15.28 kpc)
- Apparent size (V): 2.6′ × 0.494′

Other designations
- UGC 7875, PGC 42707, VCC 1932, MGC+03-32-086

NGC 4634 is an edge-on barred spiral galaxy located about 70 million light-years away in the constellation of Coma Berenices. NGC 4634 was discovered by astronomer William Herschel on January 14, 1787. It is interacting with the spiral galaxy NGC 4633. Both galaxies are members of the Virgo Cluster.

== Gallery ==
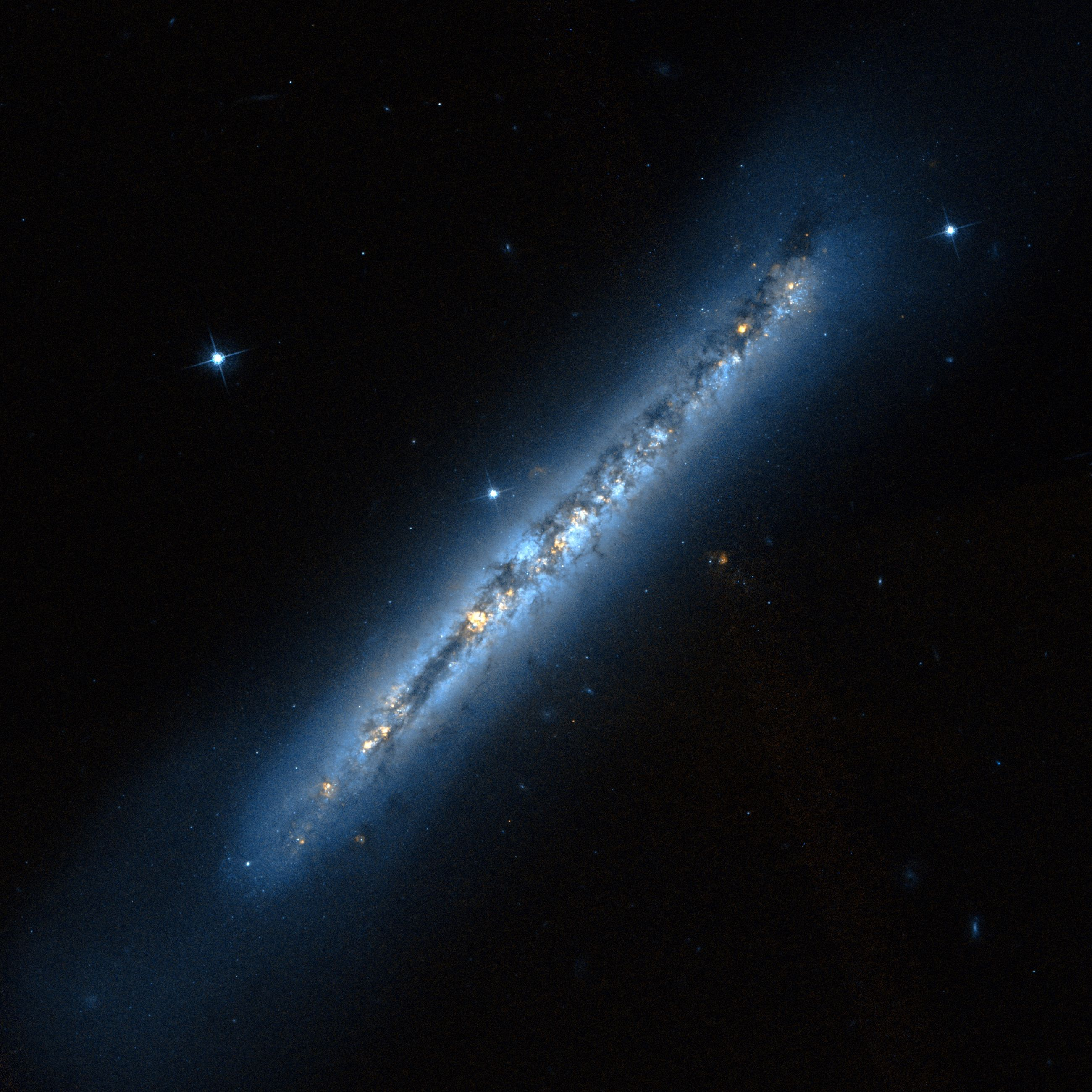
NGC 4634 by Hubble Space Telescope

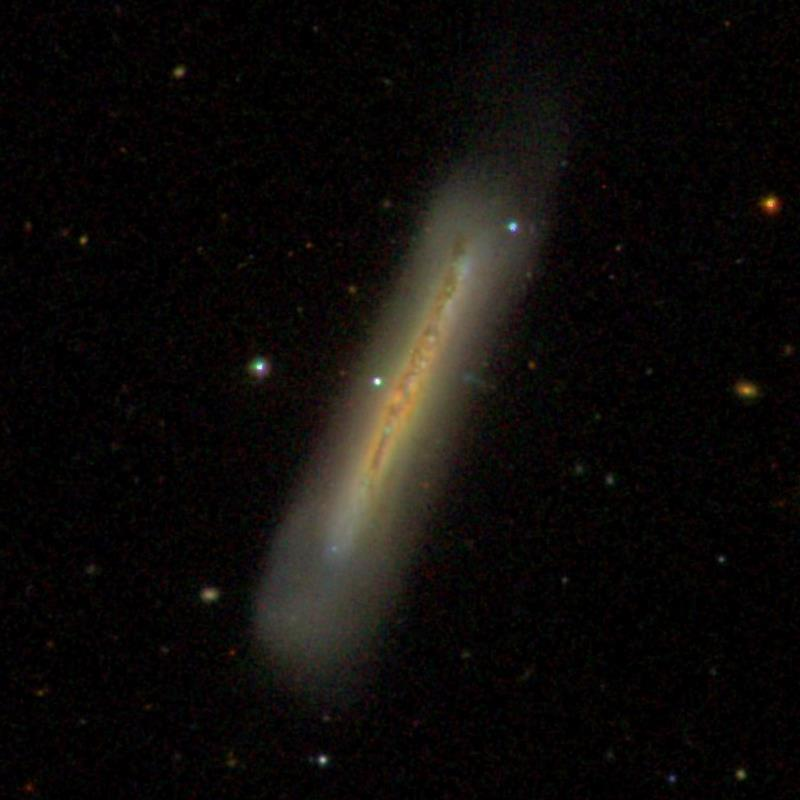
NGC 4634 (SDSS DR14)
