= NGC 4633 =

Galaxy in the constellation Coma Berenices

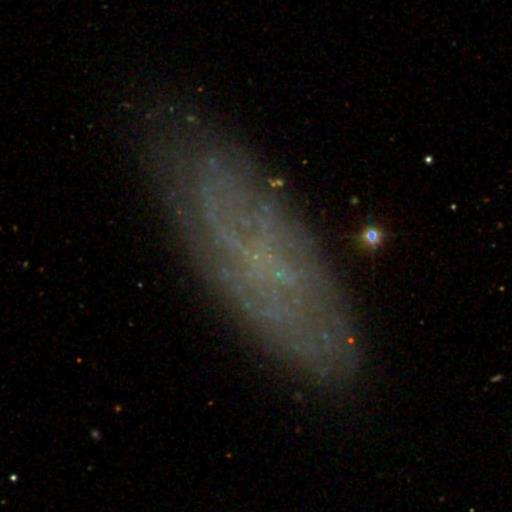
- SDSS image of NGC 4633.

Observation data (J2000 epoch)
- Constellation: Coma Berenices
- Right ascension: 12^{h} 42^{m} 37.4^{s}
- Declination: 14° 21′ 26″
- Redshift: 0.000971/291 km/s
- Distance: 69,154,400 ly
- Group or cluster: Virgo Cluster
- Apparent magnitude (V): 13.8

Characteristics
- Type: SAB(s)dm
- Size: ~45,602.76 ly (estimated)
- Apparent size (V): 2.29 x 0.83

Other designations
- IC 3688, PGC 42699, UGC 7874, VCC 1929

NGC 4633 is a spiral galaxy located about 70 million light-years away in the constellation of Coma Berenices. It is interacting with the nearby galaxy NGC 4634. NGC 4633 was discovered by astronomer Edward D. Swift on April 27, 1887. It was rediscovered on November 23, 1900, by astronomer Arnold Schwassmann and was later listed as IC 3688. NGC 4633 is a member of the Virgo Cluster.

== See also ==
- List of NGC objects (4001–5000)
- Arp 116
