= NGC 4297 =

Galaxy in the constellation Virgo

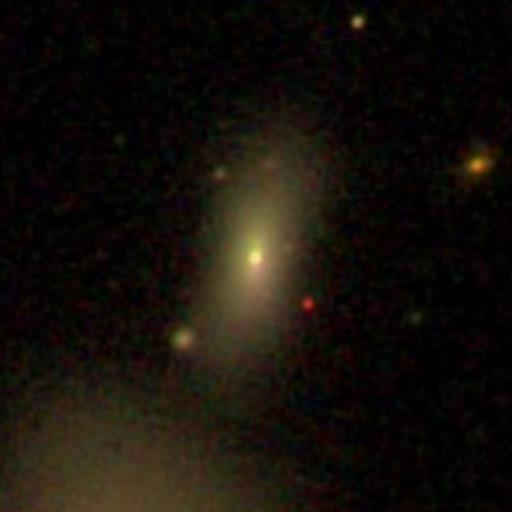
- SDSS image of NGC 4297. Part of NGC 4296 can be seen at the bottom of the image.

Observation data (J2000 epoch)
- Constellation: Virgo
- Right ascension: 12^{h} 21^{m} 27.4^{s}
- Declination: 06° 40′ 16″
- Redshift: 0.013446
- Heliocentric radial velocity: 4031 km/s
- Distance: 200 Mly (60 Mpc)
- Apparent magnitude (V): 15.7

Characteristics
- Type: S0(7)
- Apparent size (V): 1.09 x 0.29

Other designations
- KCPG 331B, MGC +01-32-018, PGC 39940, VCC 473

NGC 4297 is a lenticular galaxy located about 200 million light-years away in the constellation Virgo. It was discovered by astronomer William Herschel on April 13, 1784. It forms an interacting pair with NGC 4296.

== See also ==
- List of NGC objects (4001–5000)
