= NGC 4296 =

Barred lenticular galaxy in the constellation Virgo

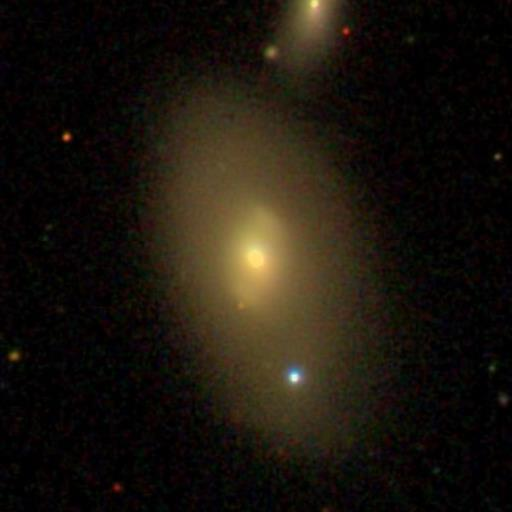
- SDSS image of NGC 4296. The small galaxy at the top of the image is NGC 4297.

Observation data (J2000 epoch)
- Constellation: Virgo
- Right ascension: 12^{h} 21^{m} 28.4^{s}
- Declination: 06° 39′ 13″
- Redshift: 0.013673
- Heliocentric radial velocity: 4099 km/s
- Distance: 198 Mly (60.7 Mpc)
- Apparent magnitude (V): 13.66

Characteristics
- Type: S0
- Size: ~91,000 ly (28 kpc) (estimated)
- Apparent size (V): 1.3 x 0.9

Other designations
- KCPG 331A, MGC +01-32-017, PGC 39943, UGC 7409, VCC 475

NGC 4296 is a barred lenticular galaxy located about 200 million light-years away in the constellation Virgo. It was discovered by astronomer William Herschel on April 13, 1784. It forms a pair with NGC 4297, and both galaxies are listed as CGCG 042-041, and KPG 331.

It also interacts with NGC 4297.

Although it does not appear in any galaxy group in the sources consulted, the designation VCC 475 indicates that NGC 4296 should be part of the Virgo Cluster.

== See also ==
- List of NGC objects (4001–5000)
