= NGC 4818 =

Galaxy in the constellation Virgo

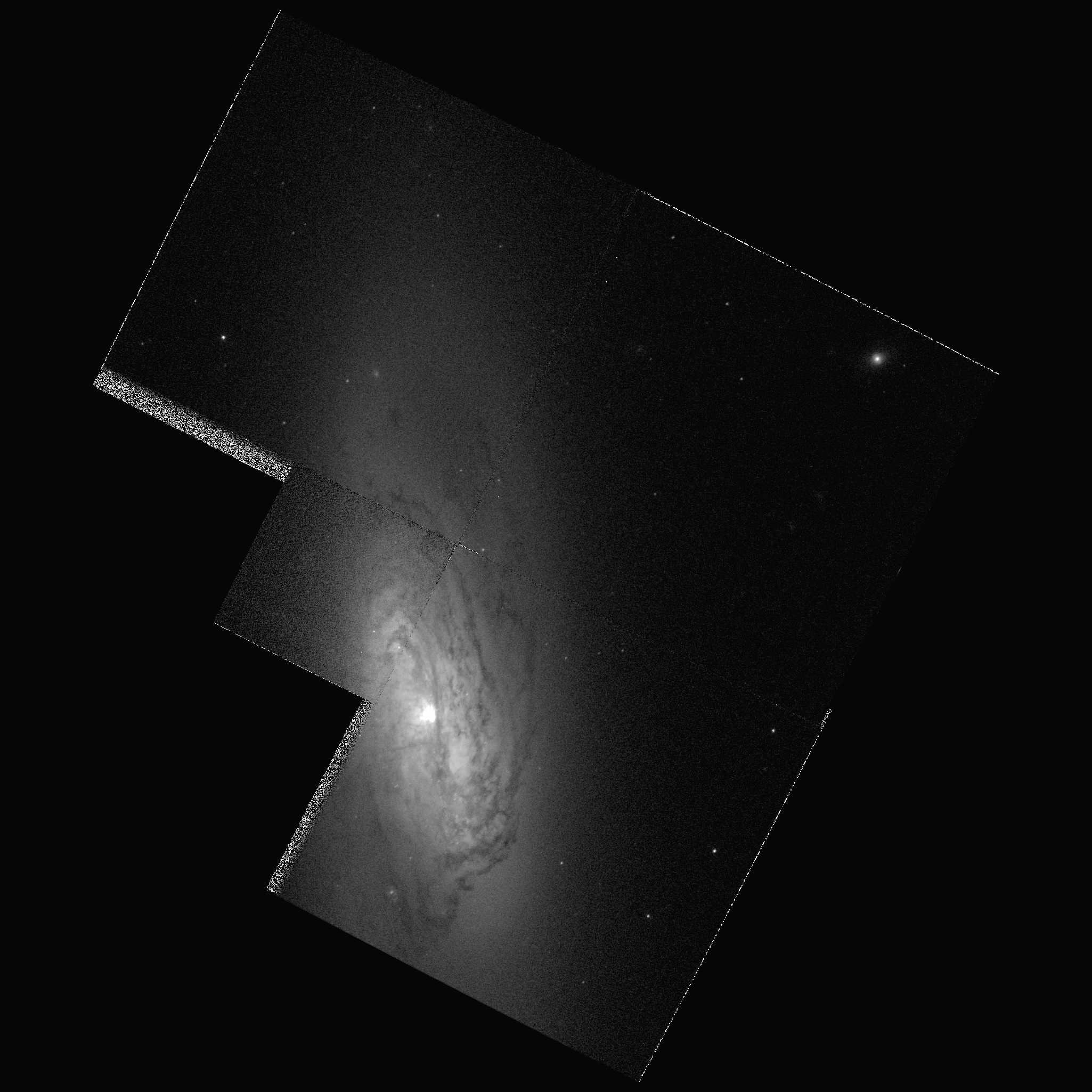
- NGC 4818 imaged by Hubble Space Telescope

Observation data (J2000 epoch)
- Constellation: Virgo
- Right ascension: 12^{h} 56^{m} 48.8829^{s}
- Declination: −08° 31′ 30.906″
- Redshift: 0.003552 ± 0.000103
- Heliocentric radial velocity: 1,065 ± 31 km/s
- Distance: 45.2 ± 14.2 Mly (13.9 ± 4.4 Mpc)
- Group or cluster: Virgo II Groups
- Apparent magnitude (V): 11.1

Characteristics
- Type: SAB(rs)ab pec
- Size: ~56,000 ly (17.3 kpc) (estimated)
- Apparent size (V): 4.3′ × 1.5′

Other designations
- IRAS 12542-0815, MCG -01-33-057, Mrk 9022, PGC 44191

NGC 4818 is a spiral galaxy in the constellation Virgo. The galaxy lies about 45 million light years away from Earth, which means, given its apparent dimensions, that NGC 4818 is approximately 55,000 light years across. It was discovered by William Herschel on March 3, 1786.

NGC 4818 has an elliptical bulge with a bright nucleus. The galaxy has a bar which appears about 30 degrees offset from the major axis of the bulge. Some loosely wrapped spiral arms emerge from the bulge. A faint disk with a low contrast broad spiral pattern is seen surrounding the bulge, aligned with the major axis of the elliptical bulge. The spectrum of the nucleus is similar to that of an HII region. The total star formation rate is estimated to be 0.7 M_{☉} per year. The total gas mass is estimated to be 10^{9.77} M_{☉} while the total star mass is about 10^{10.2} M_{☉}.

A. M. Garcia considers the galaxy to be a member of the NGC 4699 Group, or LGG 307. Other members of that group include NGC 4699, NGC 4700, NGC 4722, NGC 4742, NGC 4781, NGC 4790, and NGC 4802. Makarov et al consider the galaxy to be a member of the Messier 104 Group, along with NGC 4802 and the Sombrero Galaxy among other members. It is part of a Virgo II Groups, a chain of groups extending from the Virgo Cluster.

== Gallery ==
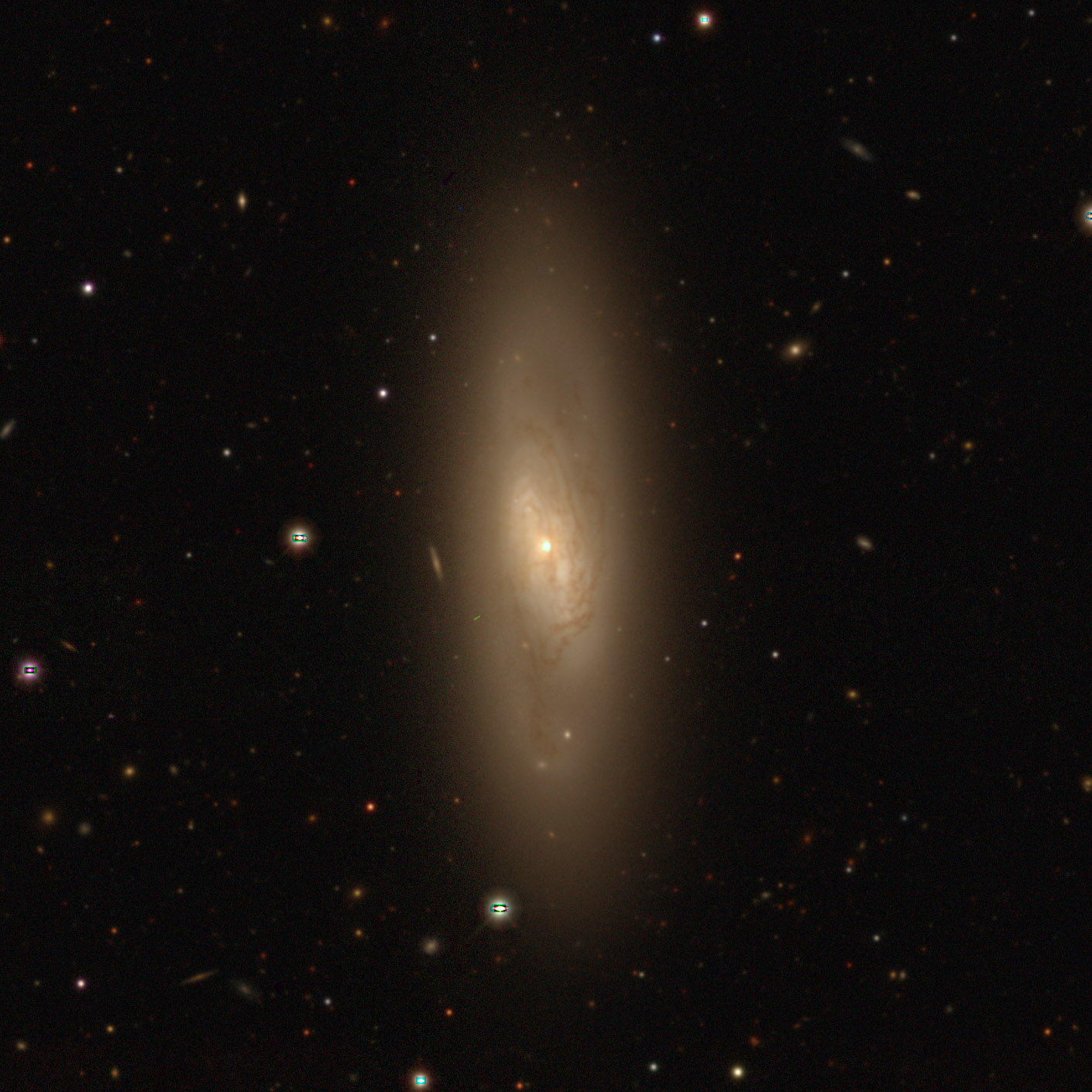
NGC 4818 by Legacy Surveys
