= Virgo II Groups =

Series of galaxy clusters

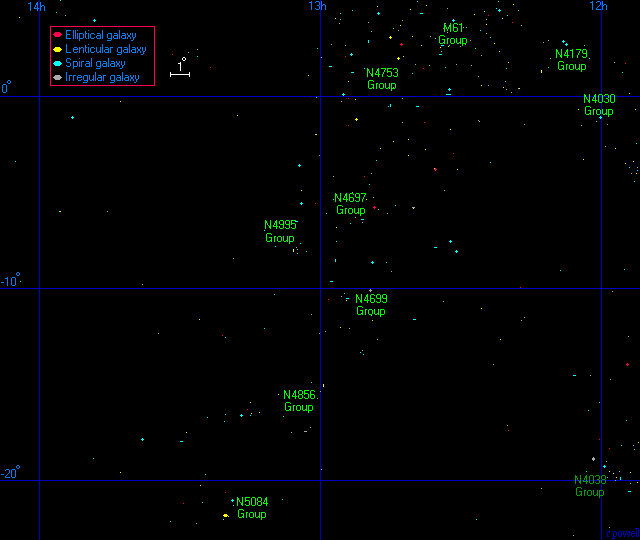
- The Virgo II Groups of galaxies

Observation data (Epoch )
- Right ascension: 12^{h} 00^{m} to 13^{h} 30^{m}
- Number of galaxies: at least 100
- Parent structure: Virgo Supercluster
- Distance: 55 Mly (16.86 Mpc) to 80 Mly (24.53 Mpc)

Other designations
- Virgo II Cloud; Virgo Southern Extension; Virgo S Cloud

The Virgo II Groups, also known as the Virgo II Cloud, Virgo Southern Extension, or the Virgo S Cloud, are a series of at least 100 galactic clusters and individual galaxies stretching approximately 30 megalight-years (9,198,041.81 parsecs) off the southern edge of the Virgo Supercluster. It is located approximately 55 Mly (16.86 Mpc) to 80 Mly (24.53 Mpc) from the Solar System, at a right ascension of 12^{h} 00^{m} to 13^{h} 30^{m} .

These clusters include:

- M61 Group:
  - IC 3474
  - M61 (NGC 4303)
  - NGC 4255
  - NGC 4420
  - NGC 4496A
  - NGC 4517A
  - NGC 4527
  - NGC 4533
  - NGC 4536
  - NGC 4581
  - NGC 4599
  - NGC 4632
  - PGC 40951
  - UGC 7387
  - UGC 7522
  - UGC 7612
  - UGC 7780
- NGC 4030 Group:
  - NGC 4030
  - UGC 6970
  - UGC 7000
- NGC 4179 Group:
  - NGC 4116
  - NGC 4123
  - NGC 4179
  - UGC 7035
- NGC 4697 Group:
  - IC 3908
  - MCG-1-33-1
  - MCG-1-33-3
  - MCG-1-33-11
  - MCG-1-33-33
  - MCG-1-33-59
  - MCG-1-33-61
  - MCG-1-33-82
  - NGC 4697
  - NGC 4731
  - NGC 4775
  - NGC 4941
  - NGC 4948
  - NGC 4948A
  - NGC 4951
  - NGC 4958
  - UGCA 310
- NGC 4699 Group:
  - MCG-2-33-15
  - MCG-2-33-47
  - MCG-1-33-60
  - MCG-2-33-85
  - NGC 4699
  - NGC 4700
  - NGC 4722
  - NGC 4742
  - NGC 4781
  - NGC 4790
  - NGC 4802
  - NGC 4818
- NGC 4753 Group:
  - NGC 4636
  - NGC 4643
  - NGC 4688
  - NGC 4691
  - NGC 4753
  - NGC 4771
  - NGC 4772
  - NGC 4808
  - NGC 4845
  - NGC 4900
  - NGC 4904
  - UGC 7824
  - UGC 7911
  - UGC 7982
  - UGC 8041
- NGC 4856 Group:
  - MCG-2-33-82
  - MCG-2-33-88
  - MCG-3-33-32
  - NGC 4856
  - NGC 4984
- NGC 4995 Group:
  - IC 4212
  - NGC 4942
  - NGC 4981
  - NGC 4995
- NGC 5084 Group:
  - ESO 576-50
  - ESO 576-40
  - NGC 5084
  - NGC 5087
  - NGC 5134
- Additional galaxies in the group:
  - M104 (NGC 4594, or the Sombrero Galaxy)
  - MCG-3-33-30
  - NGC 4457
  - NGC 4487
  - NGC 4504
  - NGC 4517
  - NGC 4546
  - NGC 4586
  - NGC 4592
  - NGC 4597
  - NGC 4665
  - NGC 4666
  - NGC 4684
  - NGC 4701
  - NGC 5054
  - NGC 5170
  - NGC 5247

== See also ==
- M96 Group
- Leo II Groups
- Virgo III Groups
