= NGC 4586 =

Spiral galaxy in the constellation Virgo

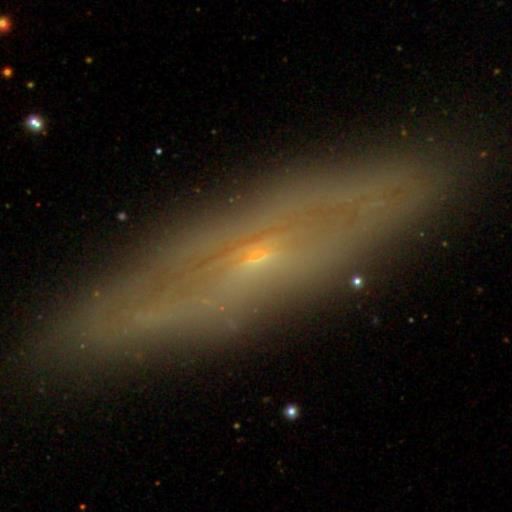
- SDSS image of NGC 4586.

Observation data (J2000 epoch)
- Constellation: Virgo
- Right ascension: 12^{h} 38^{m} 28.4^{s}
- Declination: 04° 19′ 09″
- Redshift: 0.002648
- Heliocentric radial velocity: 794 km/s
- Distance: 51 Mly (15.5 Mpc)
- Group or cluster: Virgo II Groups
- Apparent magnitude (V): 12.7

Characteristics
- Type: SA(s)a
- Size: ~60,900 ly (18.68 kpc) (estimated)
- Apparent size (V): 2.90 x 0.99

Other designations
- CGCG 42-187, IRAS 12359+0435, MCG 1-32-122, PGC 42241, UGC 7804, VCC 1760

NGC 4586 is a spiral galaxy located about 50 million light-years away in the constellation Virgo. The galaxy was discovered by astronomer William Herschel on February 2, 1786. Although listed in the Virgo Cluster Catalog, NGC 4586 is considered to be a member of the Virgo II Groups which form a southern extension of the Virgo cluster. NGC 4586 is currently in the process of infalling into the Virgo Cluster and is predicted to enter the cluster in about 500 million years.

== Boxy/Peanut bulge ==
NGC 4586 has a boxy or peanut-shaped bulge. The bulge has been interpreted to be a bar viewed edge-on.

== See also ==
- List of NGC objects (4001–5000)
- NGC 4469
- NGC 4013
