= NGC 4984 =

Galaxy in the constellation Virgo

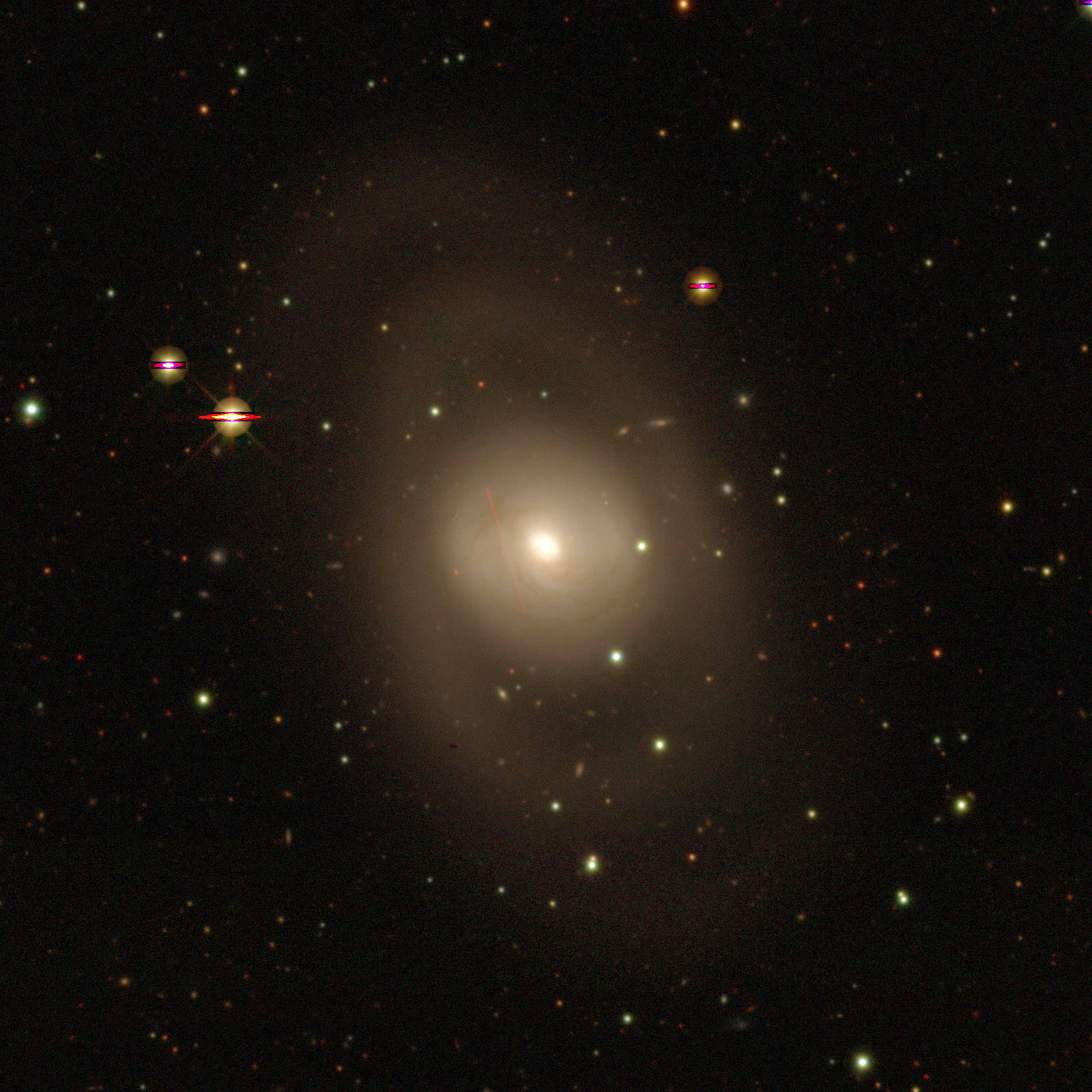
- legacy surveys image of NGC 4984

Observation data (J2000 epoch)
- Constellation: Virgo
- Right ascension: 13^{h} 08^{m} 57.2^{s}
- Declination: −15° 30′ 59″
- Redshift: 1279 ± 6 km/s
- Apparent magnitude (V): 12.3

Characteristics
- Type: (R)SAB(rs)0^{+}
- Apparent size (V): 2.8′ × 2.2′

Other designations
- PGC 45585

NGC 4984 is an intermediate lenticular galaxy exhibiting a double ring structure in the constellation Virgo. It is a member of the NGC 4856 Group of galaxies, which is a member of the Virgo II Groups, a series of galaxies and galaxy clusters strung out from the southern edge of the Virgo cluster.

== Supernova ==
One supernova has been observed in NGC 4984: SN 2011iy (Type Ia, mag. 12.7) was discovered by Kōichi Itagaki on 9 December 2011.
