= NGC 4420 =

Spiral galaxy in the constellation Virgo

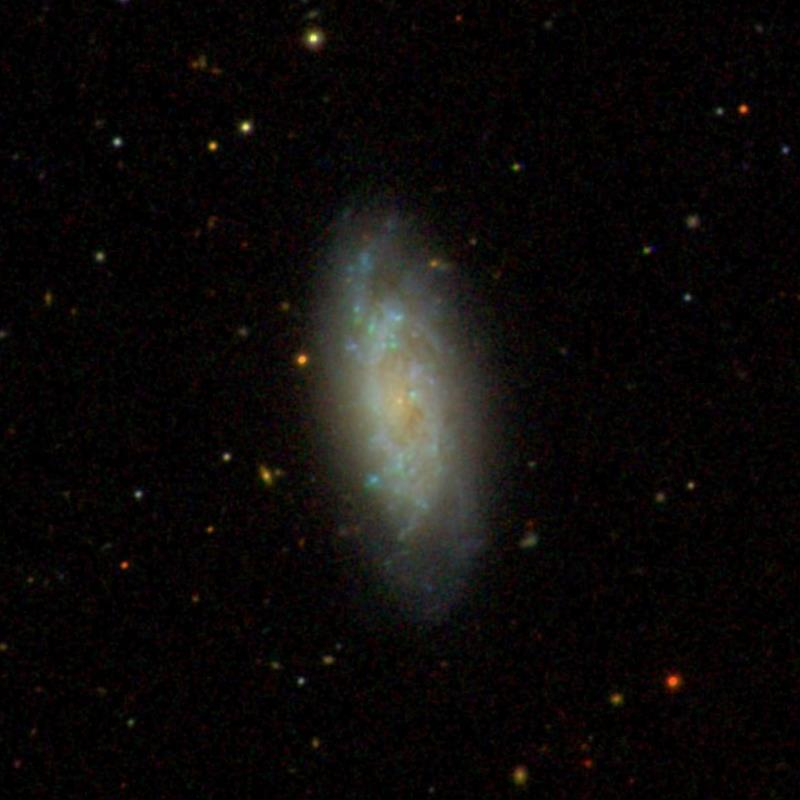
- NGC 4420

Observation data (J2000 epoch)
- Constellation: Virgo
- Right ascension: 12^{h} 26^{m} 58.50^{s}
- Declination: +02° 29′ 35.0″
- Redshift: 0.005617 (1,679 ±9 km/s)
- Distance: 77 Mly (23.62 Mpc)
- Apparent magnitude (V): 17.9

Characteristics
- Type: SAc
- Apparent size (V): 1'.995 x 0'.954

Other designations
- UGC 7549, PGC 40775, MCG+01-32-064

NGC 4420 is an unbarred spiral galaxy located 77 million light-years away in the constellation Virgo. It is a member of the M61 Group of galaxies, which is a member of the Virgo II Groups, a series of galaxies and galaxy clusters strung out from the southern edge of the Virgo Supercluster.
