= NGC 4643 =

Galaxy in the constellation of Virgo

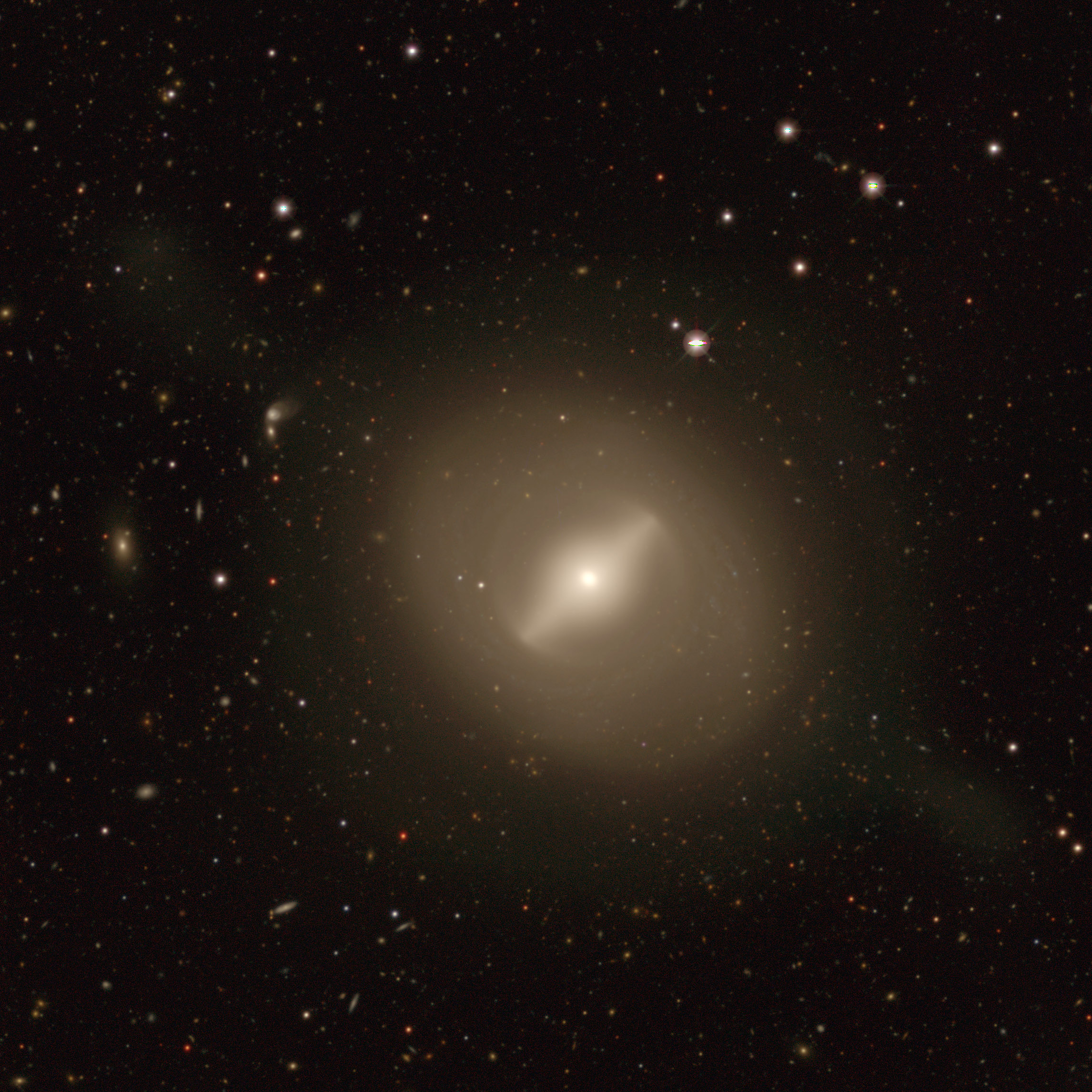
- legacy surveys image of NGC 4643

Observation data (J2000 epoch)
- Constellation: Virgo
- Right ascension: 12^{h} 43^{m} 20.134^{s}
- Declination: +01° 58′ 42.24″
- Redshift: 0.0044
- Heliocentric radial velocity: 1,316 km/s
- Distance: 62.9 ± 9.5 Mly (19.3 ± 2.9 Mpc)
- Group or cluster: Virgo Cluster
- Apparent magnitude (V): 10.65
- Apparent magnitude (B): 11.23

Characteristics
- Type: SB(rs)0/a
- Apparent size (V): 3.1′ × 2.5′

Other designations
- NGC 4643, MCG +00-33-005, PGC 42797

NGC 4643 is a barred lenticular galaxy located in the constellation of Virgo. It was discovered on January 24, 1784 by German-British astronomer William Herschel. It has an apparent visual magnitude of 11.2 and spans an angular size of 3.1′ × 2.5′. At a distance of approximately 63 million light-years (19.3 Mpc) from the Milky Way, it is a member of the NGC 4753 Group of galaxies, which belongs to the Virgo II Groups of galaxies and galaxy clusters strung out from the southern edge of the Virgo Supercluster.

The morphological classification of NGC 4643 is SB(rs)0/a, matching a lenticular galaxy with a central bar (SB) and a weak inner ring structure (rs). It has a lens-shaped bar, which may be an X-shaped bar seen in profile. The galactic plane is inclined at an angle of 38° with the disk oriented to a position angle of 53°. There are spiral dust lanes within the inner 10″, or 1 kpc, and it has a nuclear disk.
