= NGC 5170 =

Edge-on spiral galaxy in the constellation Virgo

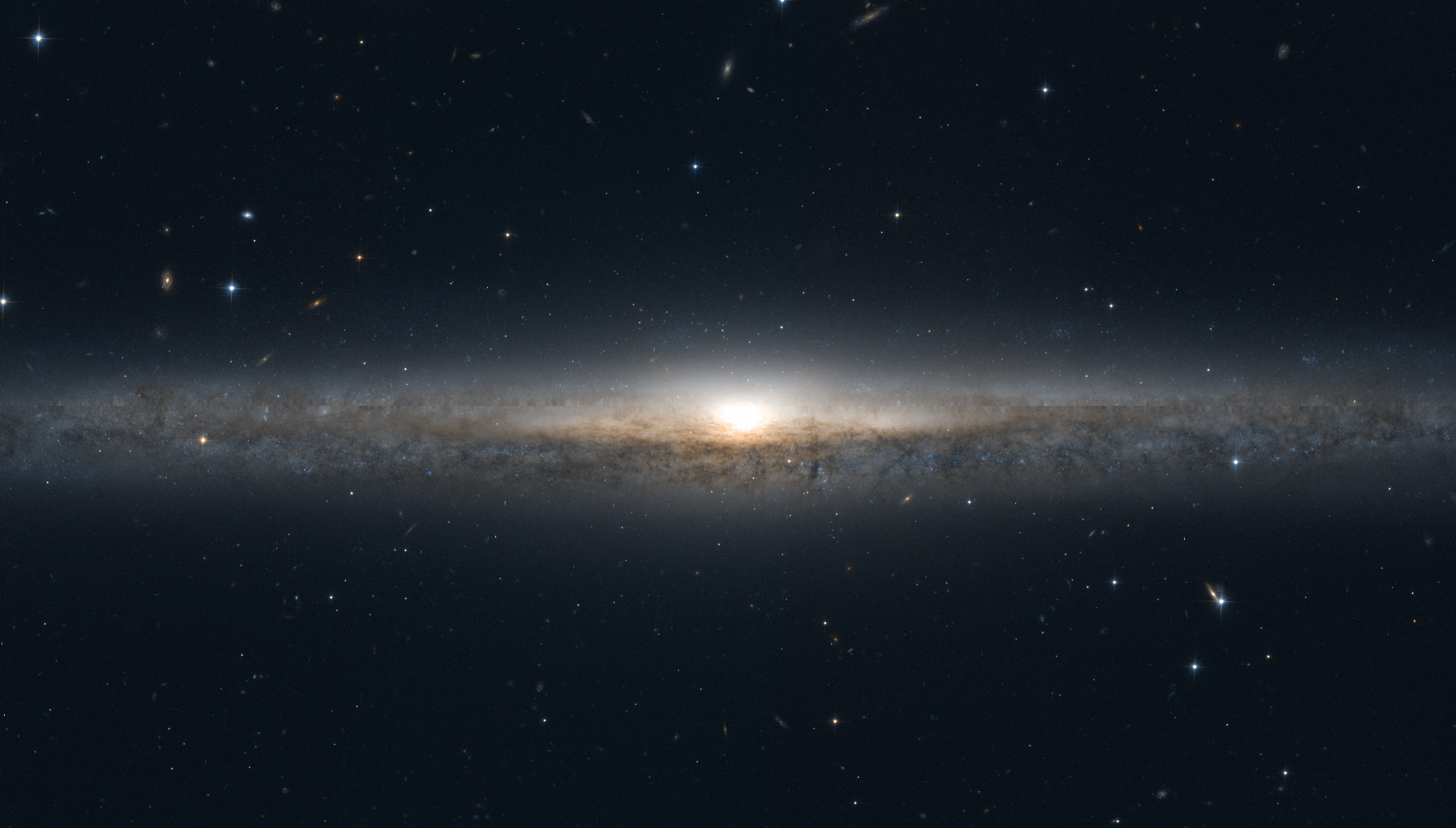
- NGC 5170 imaged by the Hubble Space Telescope

Observation data (J2000 epoch)
- Constellation: Virgo
- Right ascension: 13^{h} 29^{m} 48.769^{s}
- Declination: −17° 57′ 59.39″
- Redshift: 0.005006
- Heliocentric radial velocity: 1,502 km/s
- Galactocentric velocity: 1,386 km/s
- Distance: 83.5 Mly (25.59 Mpc)
- Apparent magnitude (V): 12.4
- Apparent magnitude (B): 12.07
- Absolute magnitude (V): −21.6

Characteristics
- Type: SA(s)c: sp
- Size: 293,000 ly (89.88 kpc) (estimated)
- Apparent size (V): 9′.9 × 1′.2

Other designations
- IRAS 13271-1742, NGC 5170, UGCA 360, LEDA 47394, MCG -03-34-084, PGC 47394

NGC 5170 is a large, nearby, edge-on spiral galaxy in the equatorial constellation of Virgo. It was discovered on February 7, 1785 by William Herschel. This galaxy is located at a distance of 83.5 million light years and is receding at a heliocentric radial velocity of 1,502 km/s. It is a member of the Virgo II Groups, a series of galaxies and galaxy clusters strung out from the southern edge of the Virgo Supercluster.

The inclination of the galactic plane of NGC 5170 is tilted at an angle of ~86° to the line of sight from the Earth, which means the disk is significantly obscured. It is estimated to have a morphological class of type Sb to Sc, meaning the spiral arms are moderate to loosely wound. The bulge-to-disk ratio of 0.5 is more consistent with an Sb galaxy. It has an estimated star formation rate of 1.37±0.23 M_{☉}·yr^{−1}, which is more than double the rate in the Milky Way.

The galactic latitude of this star is 43°, making the field relatively free of stars in the Milky Way. Combined with the proximity and edge-on view of NGC 5170, this makes galaxy useful for studies of its globular cluster population. It is estimated to have a total of 600±100 globulars, which is much higher than for the Milky Way. A candidate ultra-compact dwarf galaxy has been identified that is associated with NGC 5170.

Numerical modeling of this galaxy indicates it has a massive dark halo with a thin, low surface brightness disk. The halo mass of NGC 5170 is 3.4×10^{12} M_{☉}. Examination of the galaxy with the Chandra X-ray Observatory showed there is no diffuse X-ray emission from hot gas in the extended galactic halo.
