= NGC 4527 =

Galaxy in the constellation Virgo

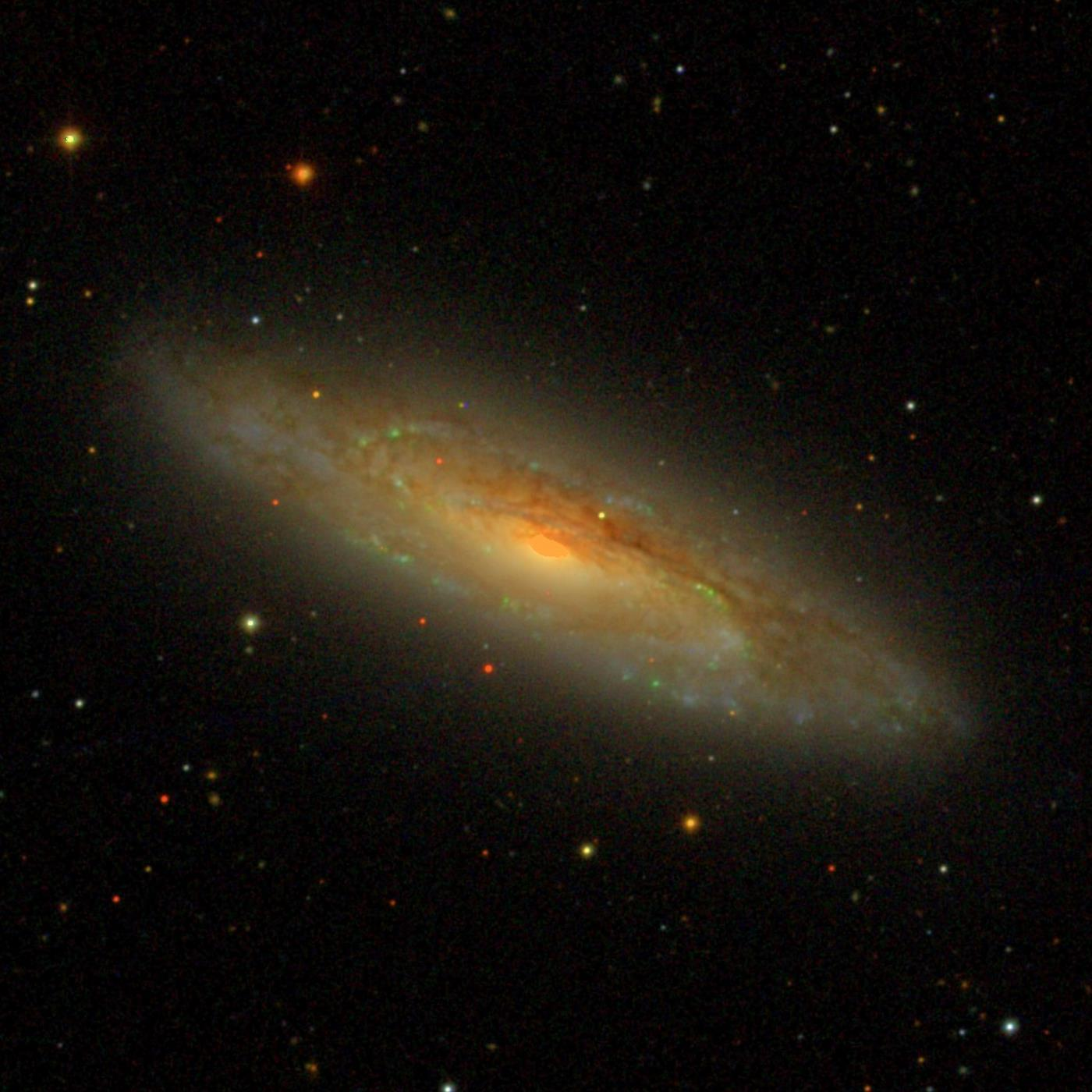
- NGC 4527 imaged by SDSS

Observation data (J2000 epoch)
- Constellation: Virgo
- Right ascension: 12^{h} 34^{m} 08.466^{s}
- Declination: +02° 39′ 14.414″
- Redshift: 0.005791
- Heliocentric radial velocity: 1,736±1 km/s
- Distance: 48.9 Mly (15.0 Mpc)
- Apparent magnitude (V): 10.5

Characteristics
- Type: SAB(s)bc
- Size: ~104,100 ly (31.92 kpc) (estimated)
- Apparent size (V): 6.2′ × 2.1′

Other designations
- IRAS 12315+0255, NGC 4527, UGC 7721, MCG +01-32-101, PGC 41789, CGCG 042-156

NGC 4527 is a spiral galaxy in the constellation of Virgo. It was discovered by German-British astronomer William Herschel on 23 February 1784.

NGC 4527 is a member of the M61 Group of galaxies, which is a member of the Virgo II Groups, a series of galaxies and galaxy clusters strung out from the southern edge of the Virgo Supercluster.

== Characteristics ==
NGC 4527 is an intermediate spiral galaxy and is located at a distance not well determined, but usually is considered to be an outlying member of the Virgo Cluster of galaxies, being placed within the subcluster known as S Cloud.

NGC 4527 is also a starburst galaxy, with 2.5 billion solar masses of molecular hydrogen concentrated within its innermost regions. However, this starburst is still weak and seems to be on its earliest phases.

== Supernovae ==
Three supernovae have been observed in NGC 4527:

- SN 1915A (type unknown, mag. 15.5) was discovered by Heber Curtis on 20 March 1915.
- SN 1991T (Type Ia-pec, mag. 13) was discovered by Stephen Knight on 13 April 1991, and independently reported by Robert Evans, Mirko Villi, Giancarlo Cortini, and Wayne Johnson. This supernova has been studied extensively as a peculiar and overluminous Type Ia, and is now used as a template, with similar events being classified as Type Ia-91T-like.
- SN 2004gn (Type Ic, mag. 16.6) was discovered by the Lick Observatory Supernova Search (LOSS) on 1 December 2004.

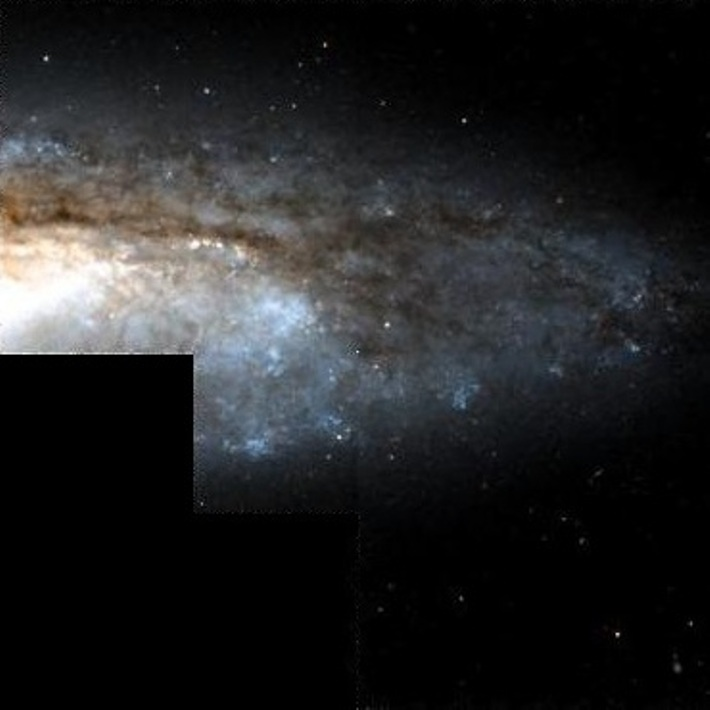
NGC 4527 imaged by the Hubble Space Telescope

== See also ==
- List of NGC objects (4001–5000)
