= NGC 4536 =

Spiral galaxy in the constellation Virgo

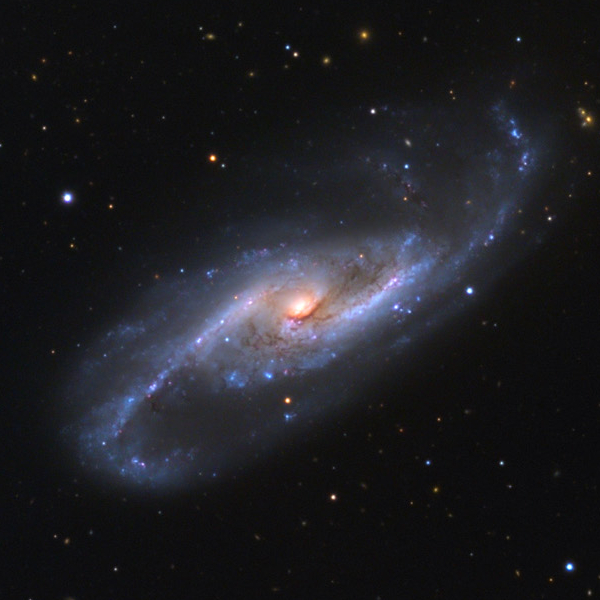
- NGC 4536 imaged by the Mount Lemmon Skycenter

Observation data (J2000 epoch)
- Constellation: Virgo
- Right ascension: 12^{h} 34^{m} 27.129^{s}
- Declination: +02° 11′ 16.37″
- Redshift: 0.006031±0.000003
- Heliocentric radial velocity: 1,808±1 km/s
- Distance: 48.7 ± 0.9 Mly (14.93 ± 0.28 Mpc)
- Apparent magnitude (V): 10.3

Characteristics
- Type: SAB(rs)bc
- Size: ~108,200 ly (33.17 kpc) (estimated)
- Apparent size (V): 7.6′ × 3.2′

Other designations
- NGC 4536, UGC 7732, MCG +00-32-023, PGC 41823, CGCG 014-068

NGC 4536 is an intermediate barred spiral galaxy in the constellation of Virgo. It was discovered by German-British astronomer William Herschel on 24 January 1784.

NGC 4536 is located about 10° south of the midpoint of the Virgo Cluster. However, it is not considered a member of the cluster. Rather, it is a member of the M61 Group of galaxies, which is a member of the Virgo II Groups, a series of galaxies and galaxy clusters strung out from the southern edge of the Virgo Supercluster. The morphological classification in the De Vaucouleurs system is SAB(rs)bc, which indicates it is a weakly barred spiral galaxy with a hint of an inner ring structure plus moderate to loosely wound arms. It does not have a classical bulge around the nucleus.

NGC 4536 has the optical characteristics of an HII galaxy, which means it is undergoing a strong burst of star formation. This is occurring prominently in the ring that surrounds the bar and nucleus. Based upon the level of X-ray emission from the core, it may have a small supermassive black hole with 10^{4}–10^{6} times the mass of the Sun.

Currently NGC 4536 is undergoing a phase of rapid star formation, qualifying it as a Starburst galaxy, though currently, no other body has been seen influencing it to increase its rate of star formation.

== Supernova ==
One supernova has been observed in NGC 4536: SN 1981B (Type Ia, mag. 12.3) was discovered by Dmitry Tsvetkov on 2 March 1981, located 51 arcseconds to the northeast of the Galactic Center. It reached a peak visual magnitude of 12 on March 8 before steadily fading from view over the next two months.

== Gallery ==
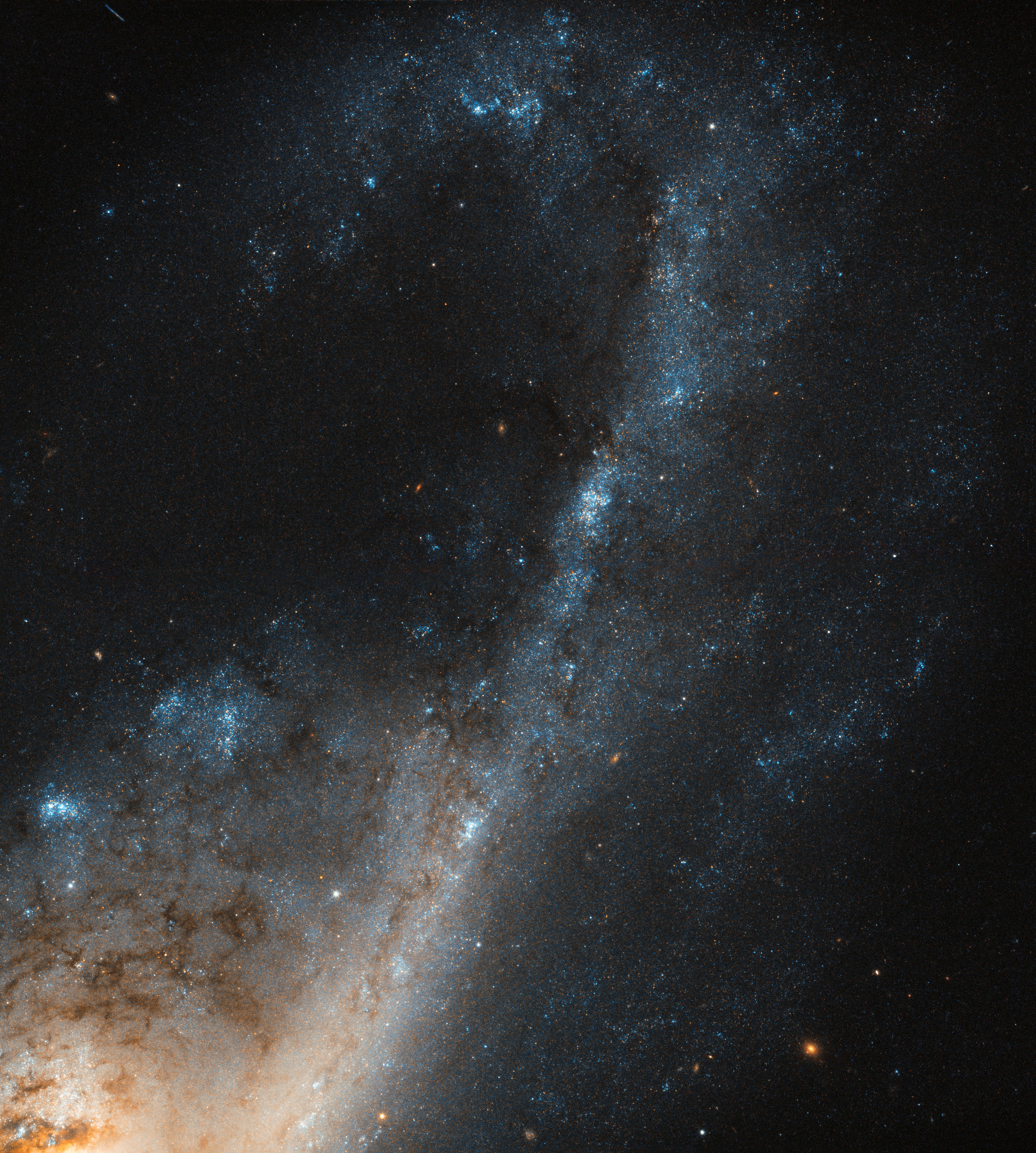
Detail of a region of extremely rapid star formation in this "starburst galaxy".

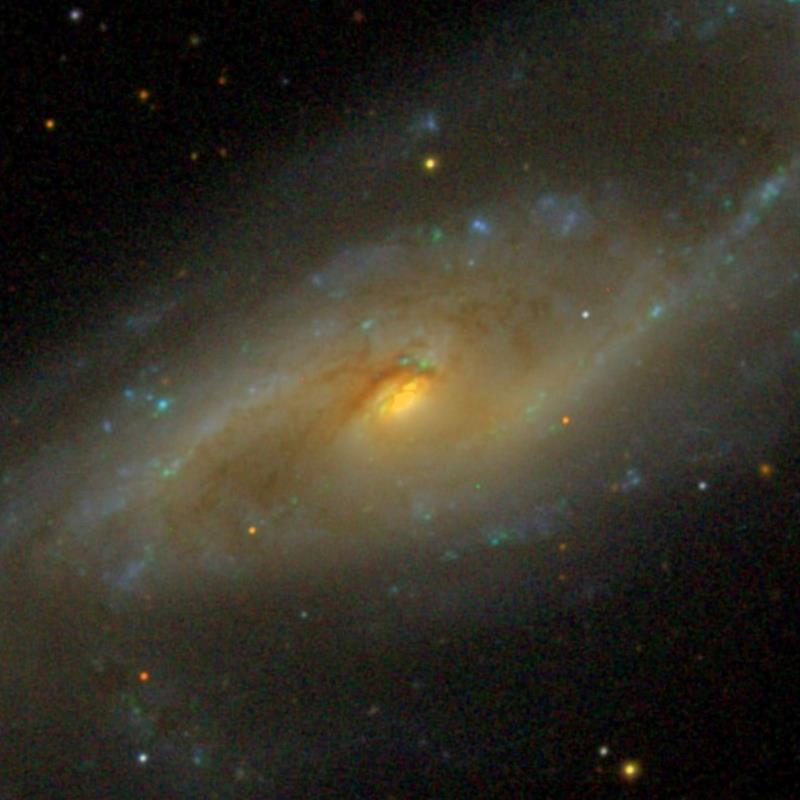
SDSS image of NGC 4536

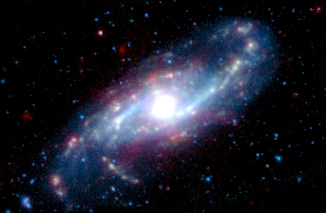
NGC 4536 by Spitzer Space Telescope

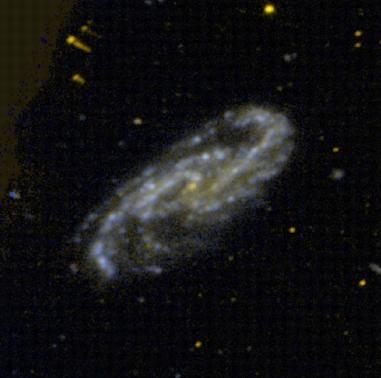
NGC 4536 by GALEX (ultraviolet)

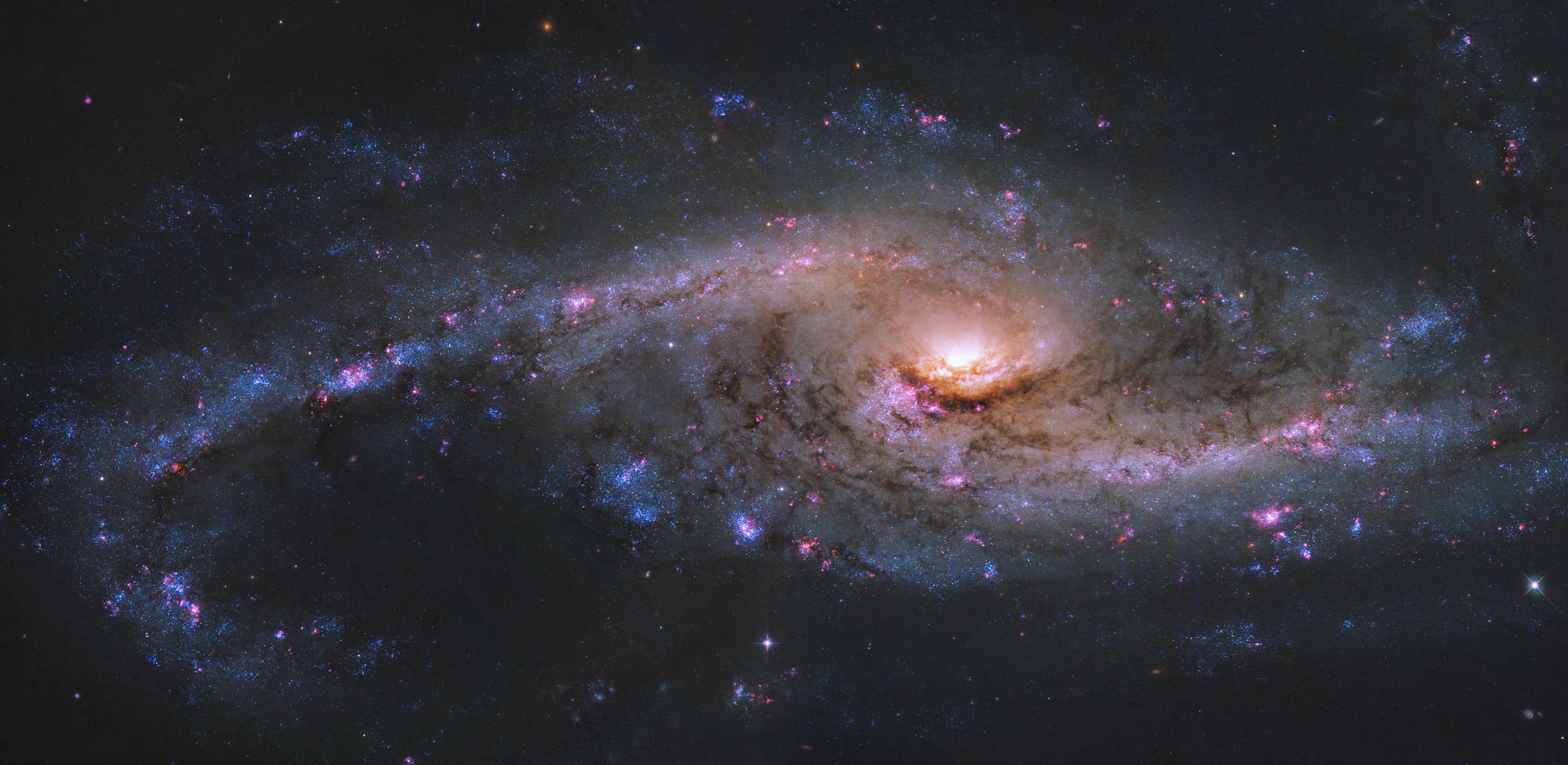
NGC 4536 imaged by the Hubble Space Telescope

== See also ==
- NGC 6946 - a similar spiral galaxy
- NGC 1365 - A similar-looking galaxy
- List of NGC objects (4001–5000)
