= NGC 4981 =

Galaxy in the constellation Virgo

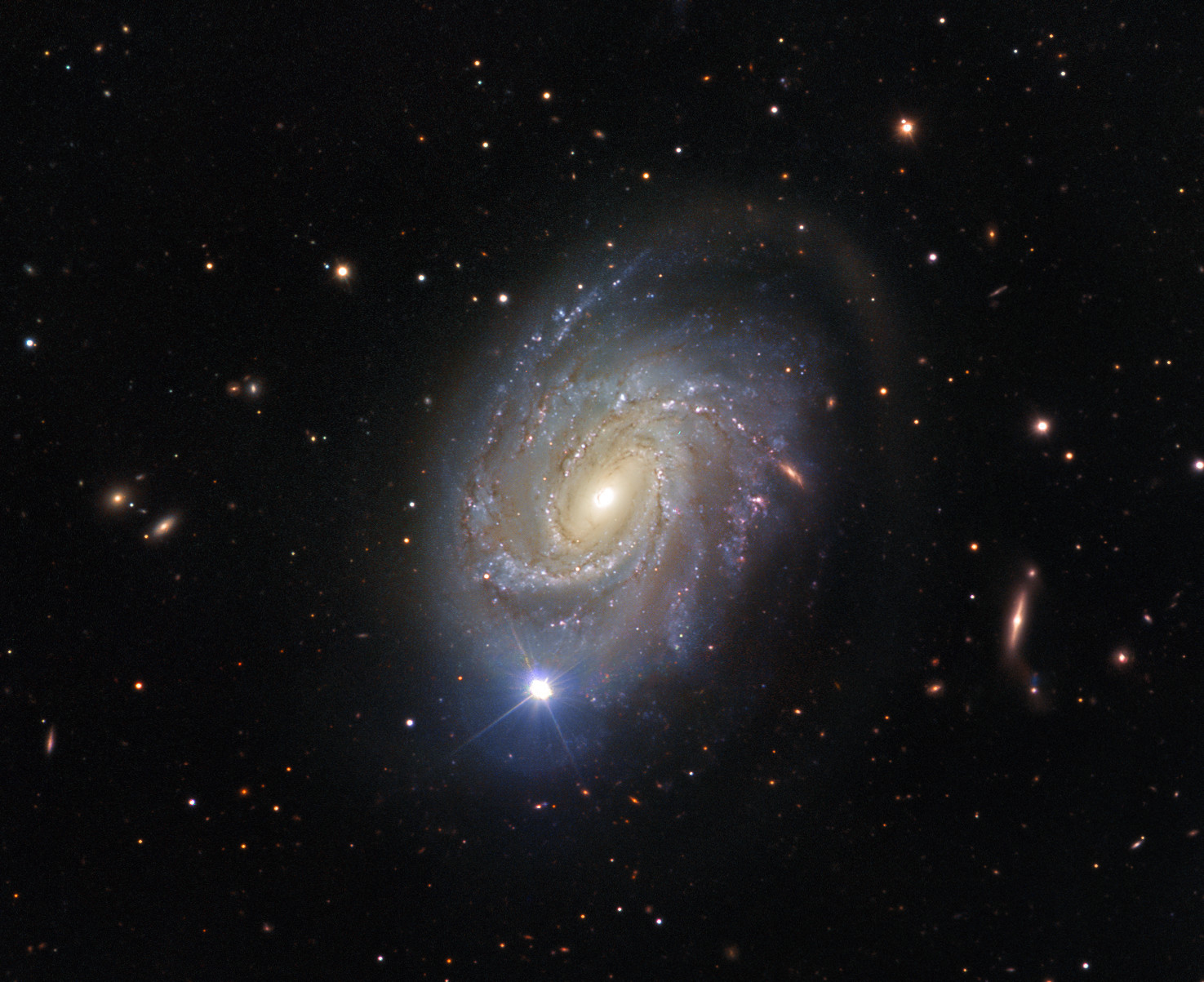
- NGC 4981 imaged by ESO's Very Large Telescope

Observation data (J2000 epoch)
- Constellation: Virgo
- Right ascension: 13^{h} 08^{m} 48.7580^{s}
- Declination: −06° 46′ 38.938″
- Redshift: 0.005597±0.000005
- Heliocentric radial velocity: 1,678±1 km/s
- Distance: 72.99 ± 2.10 Mly (22.380 ± 0.645 Mpc)
- Group or cluster: NGC 4995 group (LGG 333)
- Apparent magnitude (V): 12.10

Characteristics
- Type: SAB(r)bc
- Size: ~66,500 ly (20.38 kpc) (estimated)
- Apparent size (V): 2.8′ × 2.0′

Other designations
- IRAS 13062-0630, 2MASX J13084873-0646392, MCG -01-34-003, PGC 45574

NGC 4981 is a barred spiral galaxy in the constellation of Virgo. Its velocity with respect to the cosmic microwave background is 2,002±23 km/s, which corresponds to a Hubble distance of 96.3 ± 6.8 Mly (29.54 ± 2.09 Mpc). However, 20 non-redshift measurements give a closer distance of 72.99 ± 2.10 Mly (22.380 ± 0.645 Mpc). It was discovered by German-British astronomer William Herschel on 17 April 1784.

NGC 4981 is a LINER galaxy, i.e. a galaxy whose nucleus has an emission spectrum characterized by broad lines of weakly ionized atoms.

== NGC 4995 group ==
According to A. M. Garcia, NGC 4981 is part of the NGC 4995 group (also known as LGG 333). This group of galaxies has at least five members, including NGC 4928, NGC 4942, NGC 4995, and IC 4212.

== Supernovae ==
Two supernovae have been observed in NGC 4981:

- SN 1968I (Type Ia, mag. 13.5) was discovered by Hungarian astronomer Miklós Lovas on 23 April 1968.
- SN 2007C (Type Ib, mag. 15.9) was discovered by Kōichi Itagaki on 7 January 2007.

== See also ==
- List of NGC objects (4001–5000)
