= NGC 4517 =

Spiral galaxy in the constellation of Virgo

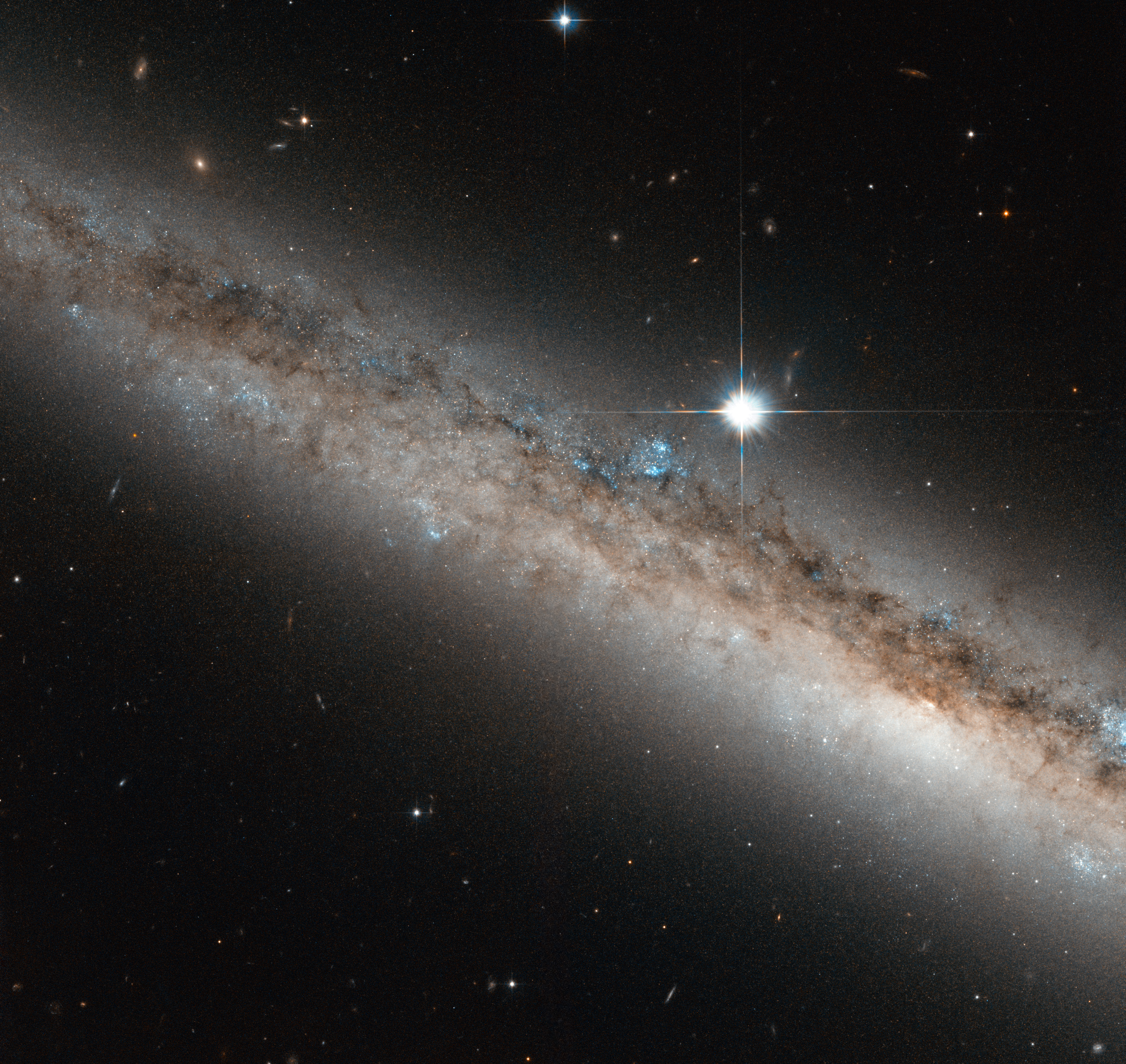
- Composed image from visible and infrared light gathered by the Hubble Space Telescope.

Observation data (J2000 epoch)
- Constellation: Virgo
- Right ascension: 12^{h} 32^{m} 45.586^{s}
- Declination: +00° 06′ 54.14″
- Redshift: 0.003780
- Heliocentric radial velocity: 1,131 km/s
- Distance: 40 Mly (12 Mpc)
- Group or cluster: NGC 4517 group
- Apparent magnitude (V): 9.4
- Apparent magnitude (B): 12.4

Characteristics
- Type: Sc(dSc)
- Apparent size (V): 6.8′ × 3.7′

Other designations
- IRAS 12301+0023, 2MASX J12324558+0006541, NGC 4437, UGC 7694, MCG +00-32-020, PGC 41618 RFGC 2315, Z 14-63, FGC 1455, TC 225, Z 1230.2+0024, GNY 1, 2MFGC 9881, UZC J123245.6+000649, UZC J123245.6+000648, KPG 344b, PSCz Q12301+0023, 2XMMi J123245.4+000655

NGC 4517 is a spiral galaxy in the constellation of Virgo. It was discovered in 1784 by German-British astronomer William Herschel. The galaxy has an apparent visual magnitude of 9.4 and spans an angular size of 6.8′ × 3.7′. It is located at a distance of approximately 40 million light-years from the Milky Way, where it is a member of the Virgo II Groups, a series of galaxies and galaxy clusters strung out from the southern edge of the Virgo Supercluster. Together with the nearby galaxy NGC 4592 and neighboring dwarf galaxies, it can be considered its own NGC 4517 galaxy group.

The morphological classification of NGC 4517 is SA(s)cd: sp, indicating an unbarred spiral (SA) with loosely-wound arms (cd) and no inner ring (s). The galaxy is apparently being viewed from edge-on, with an inclination angle of 82°–90° to the plane of the sky. It does not display any evidence of extended radio continuum emission beyond the disk. NGC 4517 has an estimated population of 270±60 globular clusters, of which 62±8 have been detected.

NGC 4517 includes a candidate ultraluminous X-ray source located outside the nucleus. This is most likely an accreting black hole of some type.

== Gallery ==
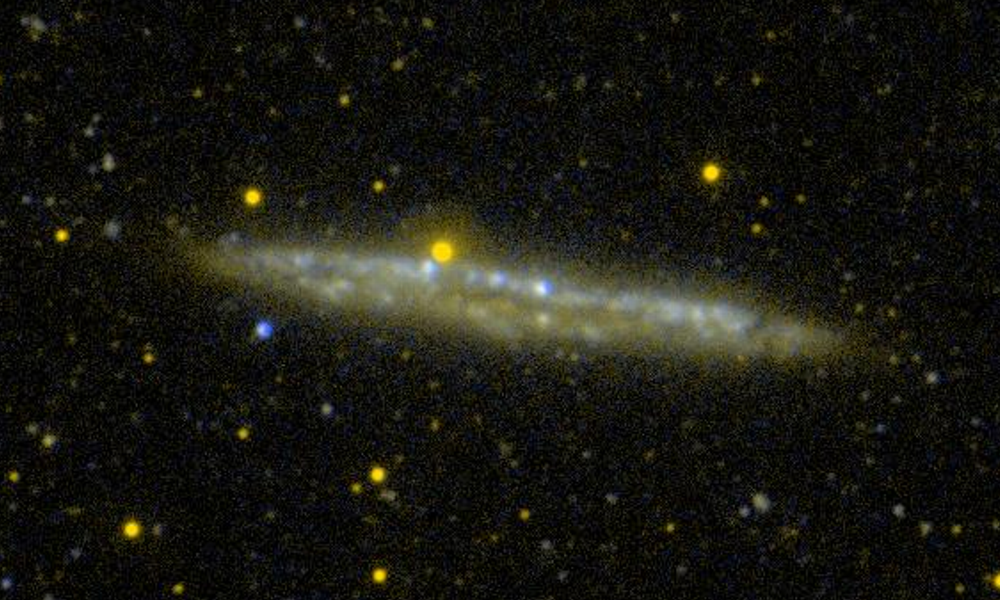
GALEX (ultraviolet)

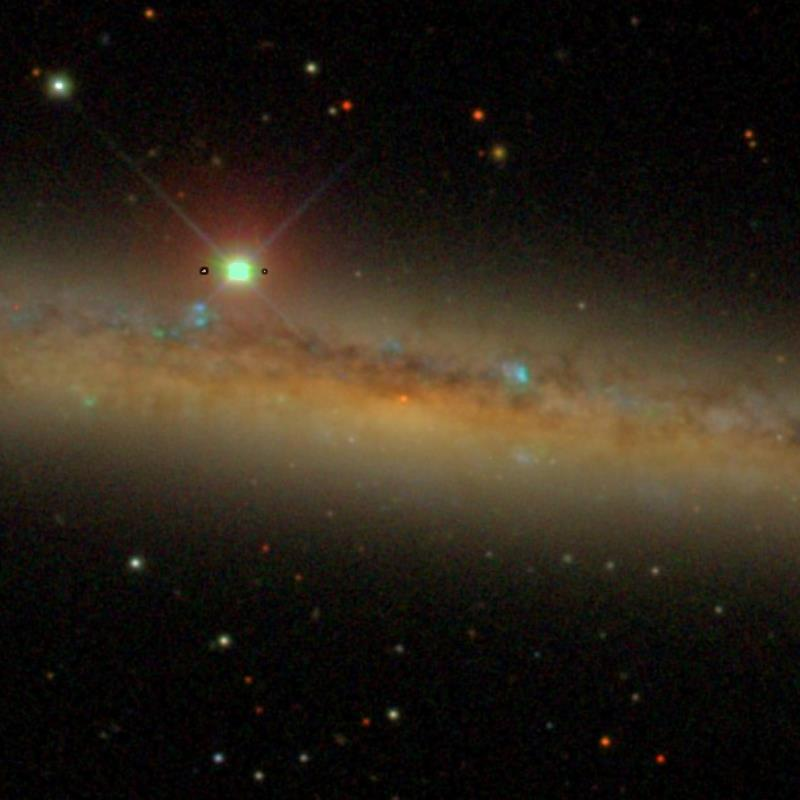
NGC 4517 by the Sloan Digital Sky Survey

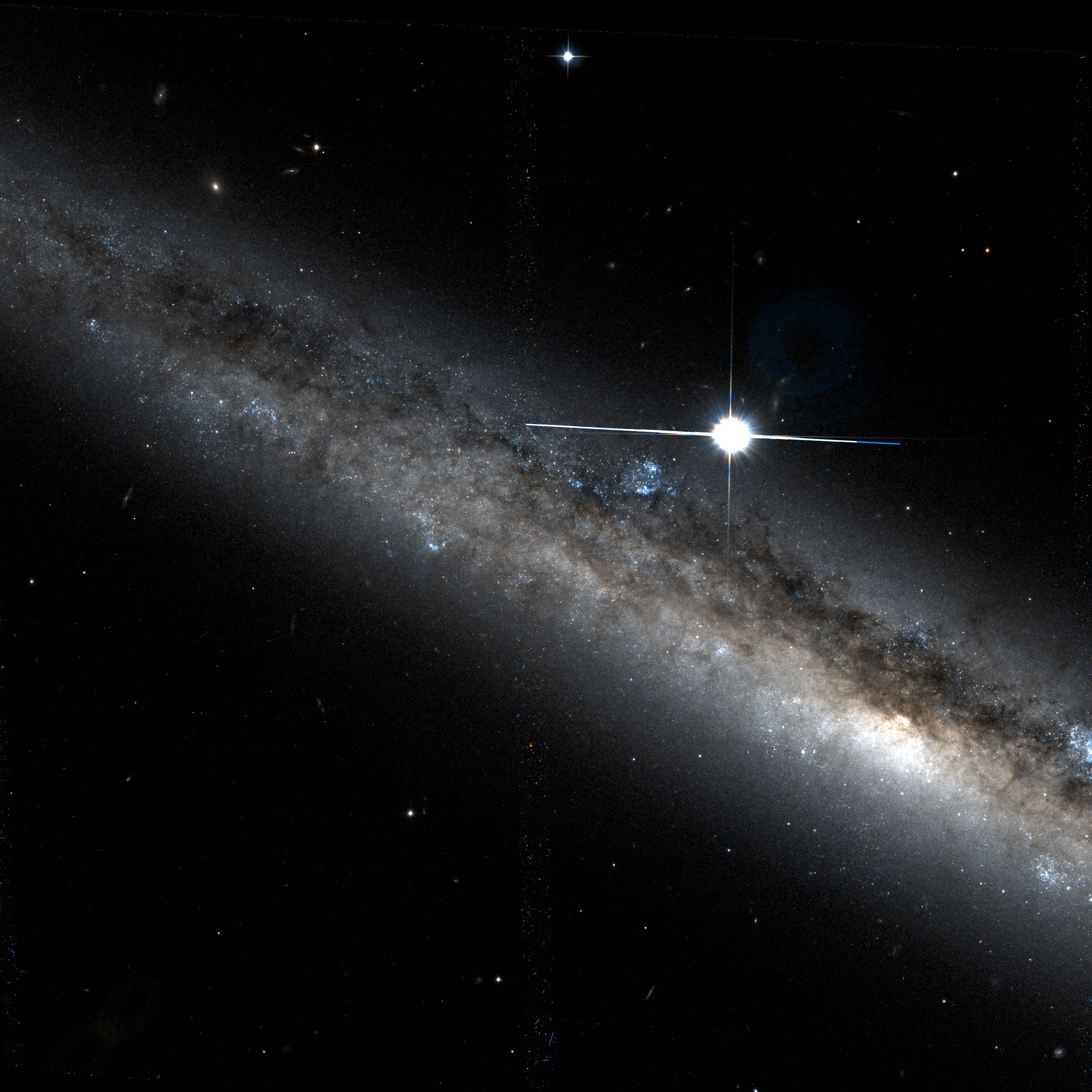
NGC 4517 by Hubble Space Telescope
