= NGC 4900 =

Barred spiral galaxy in the constellation Virgo

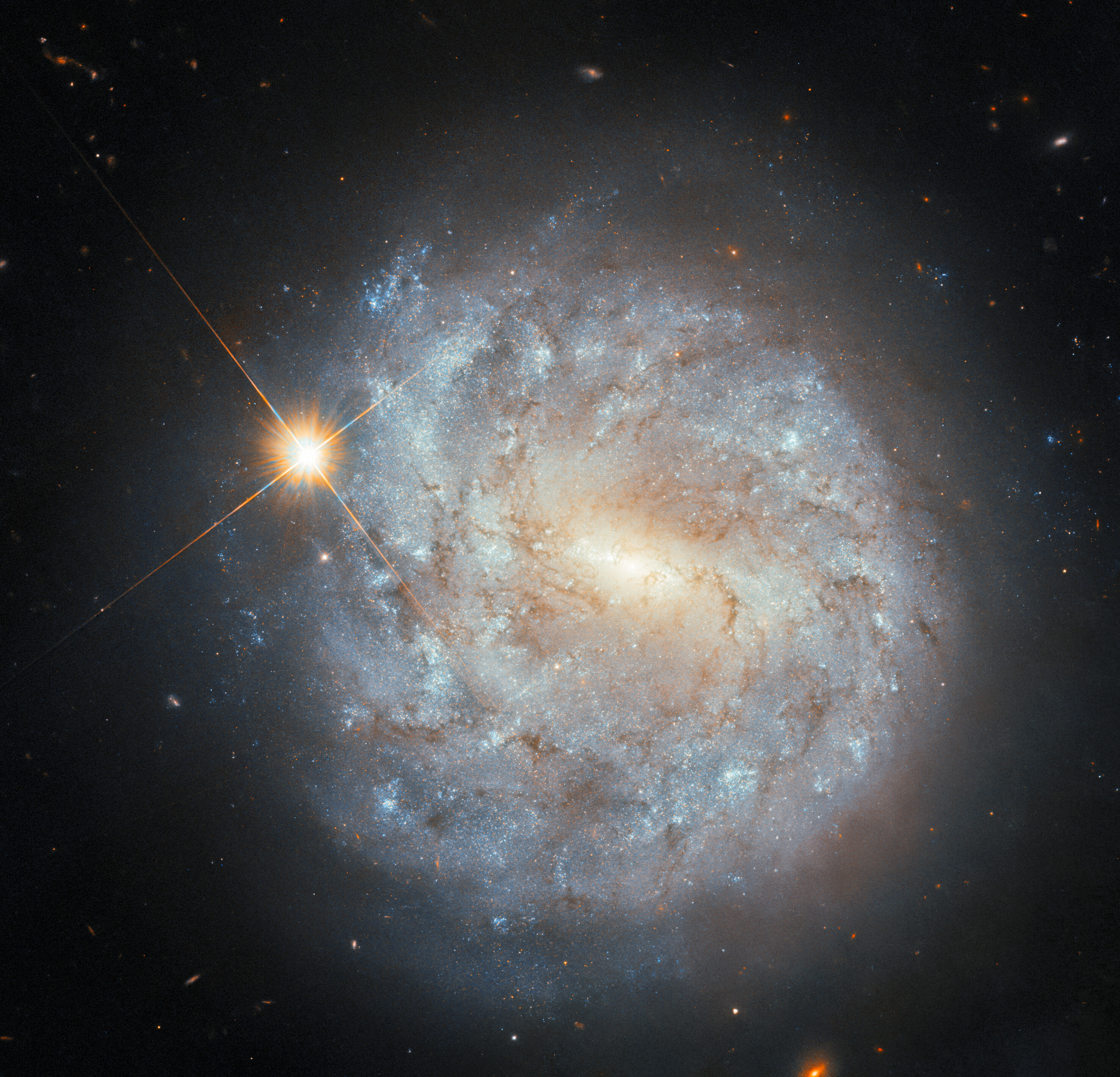
- NGC 4900 imaged by the Hubble Space Telescope

Observation data (J2000 epoch)
- Constellation: Virgo
- Right ascension: 13^{h} 00^{m} 39.2568^{s}
- Declination: +02° 30′ 02.687″
- Redshift: 0.003212
- Heliocentric radial velocity: 963 ± 1 km/s
- Distance: 70.21 ± 5.63 Mly (21.527 ± 1.726 Mpc)
- Group or cluster: NGC 4753 Group
- Apparent magnitude (B): 12.8

Characteristics
- Type: SB(rs)c;WR HII
- Size: ~66,100 ly (20.26 kpc) (estimated)
- Apparent size (V): 2.2′ × 2.1′

Other designations
- IRAS 12580+0246, UGC 8116, MCG +01-33-035, PGC 44797, CGCG 043-093

NGC 4900 is a barred spiral galaxy in the constellation Virgo. It was discovered by William Herschel on April 30, 1786. It is a member of the NGC 4753 Group of galaxies, which is a member of the Virgo II Groups, a series of galaxies and galaxy clusters strung out from the southern edge of the Virgo Supercluster.

One supernova has been observed in NGC 4900: SN 1999br (Type II, mag. 17.5) was discovered by the Lick Observatory Supernova Search (LOSS) on 12 April 1999.

== See also ==
- List of NGC objects (4001–5000)
