= NGC 4179 =

Galaxy in the constellation Virgo

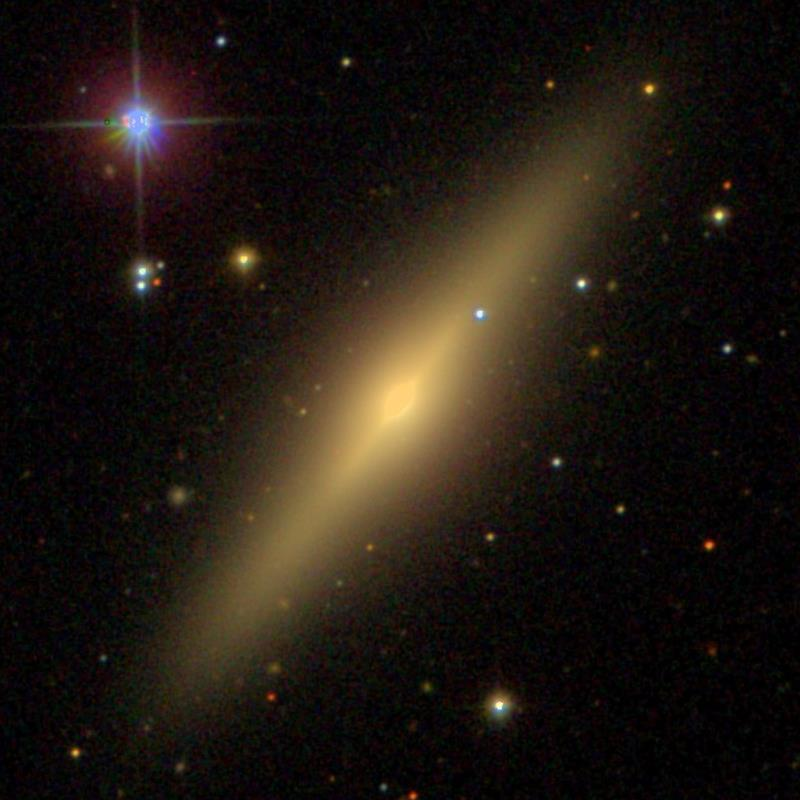
- SDSS image of NGC 4179

Observation data (J2000 epoch)
- Constellation: Virgo
- Right ascension: 12^{h} 12^{m} 52.11142^{s}
- Declination: +01° 17′ 58.9523″
- Redshift: 0.00411
- Heliocentric radial velocity: 1,230 km/s
- Distance: 57 Mly (17.6 Mpc)
- Group or cluster: Virgo Cluster
- Apparent magnitude (V): 10.9
- Apparent magnitude (B): 12.8

Characteristics
- Type: S0
- Apparent size (V): 4.2′ × 1.3′

Other designations
- NGC 4179, UGC 7214, MCG +00-31-038, PGC 38950

NGC 4179 is a lenticular galaxy located in the constellation Virgo. It was discovered by William Herschel on January 14, 1784. It is a member of the NGC 4179 Group of galaxies, which is a member of the Virgo II Groups, a series of galaxies and galaxy clusters strung out from the southern edge of the Virgo Supercluster.
