= NGC 5134 =

Galaxy in the constellation Virgo

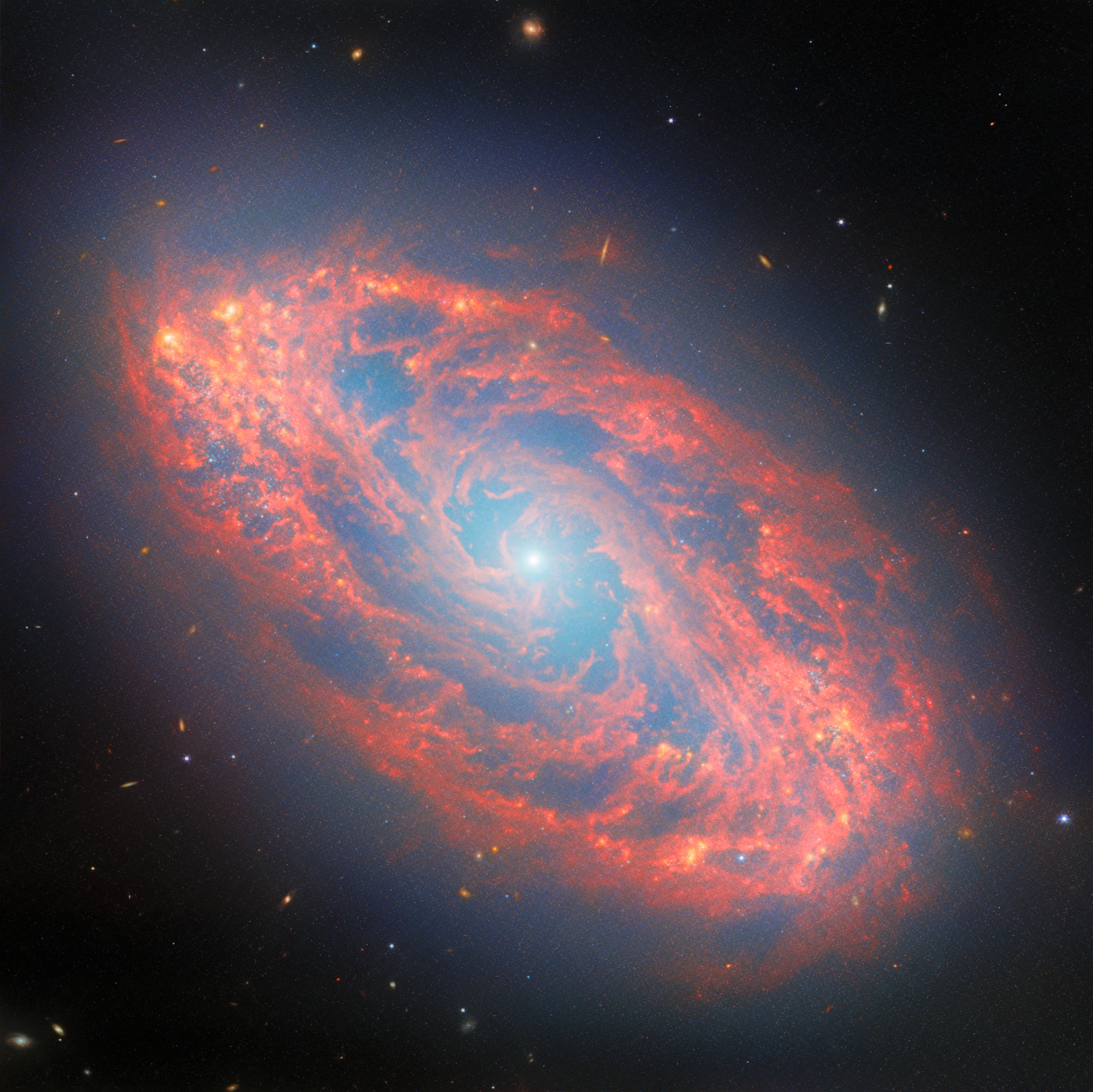
- NGC 5134 imaged by the James Webb Space Telescope

Observation data (J2000 epoch)
- Constellation: Virgo
- Right ascension: 13^{h} 25^{m} 18.5378^{s}
- Declination: −21° 08′ 03.086″
- Redshift: 0.005864±0.00000700
- Heliocentric radial velocity: 1,758±2 km/s
- Distance: 28.53 ± 3.93 Mly (8.746 ± 1.206 Mpc)
- Group or cluster: NGC 5084 group (LGG 345)
- Apparent magnitude (V): 12.83

Characteristics
- Type: SA(s)b
- Size: ~42,200 ly (12.95 kpc) (estimated)
- Apparent size (V): 2.8′ × 1.7′

Other designations
- ESO 576- G 052, IRAS 13225-2052, 2MASX J13251856-2108030, MCG -03-34-073, PGC 46938

NGC 5134 is a spiral galaxy in the constellation of Virgo. Its velocity with respect to the cosmic microwave background is 2,061±21 km/s, which corresponds to a Hubble distance of 99.2 ± 7.0 Mly (30.40 ± 2.15 Mpc). However, 20 non-redshift measurements give a much closer mean distance of 28.53 ± 3.93 Mly (8.746 ± 1.206 Mpc). It was discovered by German-British astronomer William Herschel on 10 March 1785.

NGC 5134 has a possible active galactic nucleus, i.e. it has a compact region at the center of a galaxy that emits a significant amount of energy across the electromagnetic spectrum, with characteristics indicating that this luminosity is not produced by the stars.

== NGC 5084 Group ==
NGC 5134 is a member of the NGC 5084 group (also known as LGG 345). This group contains five galaxies, including NGC 5084, NGC 5087, ESO 576-50, ESO 576-40.

== See also ==
- List of NGC objects (5001–6000)
