= NGC 4030 =

Spiral galaxy in the constellation Virgo

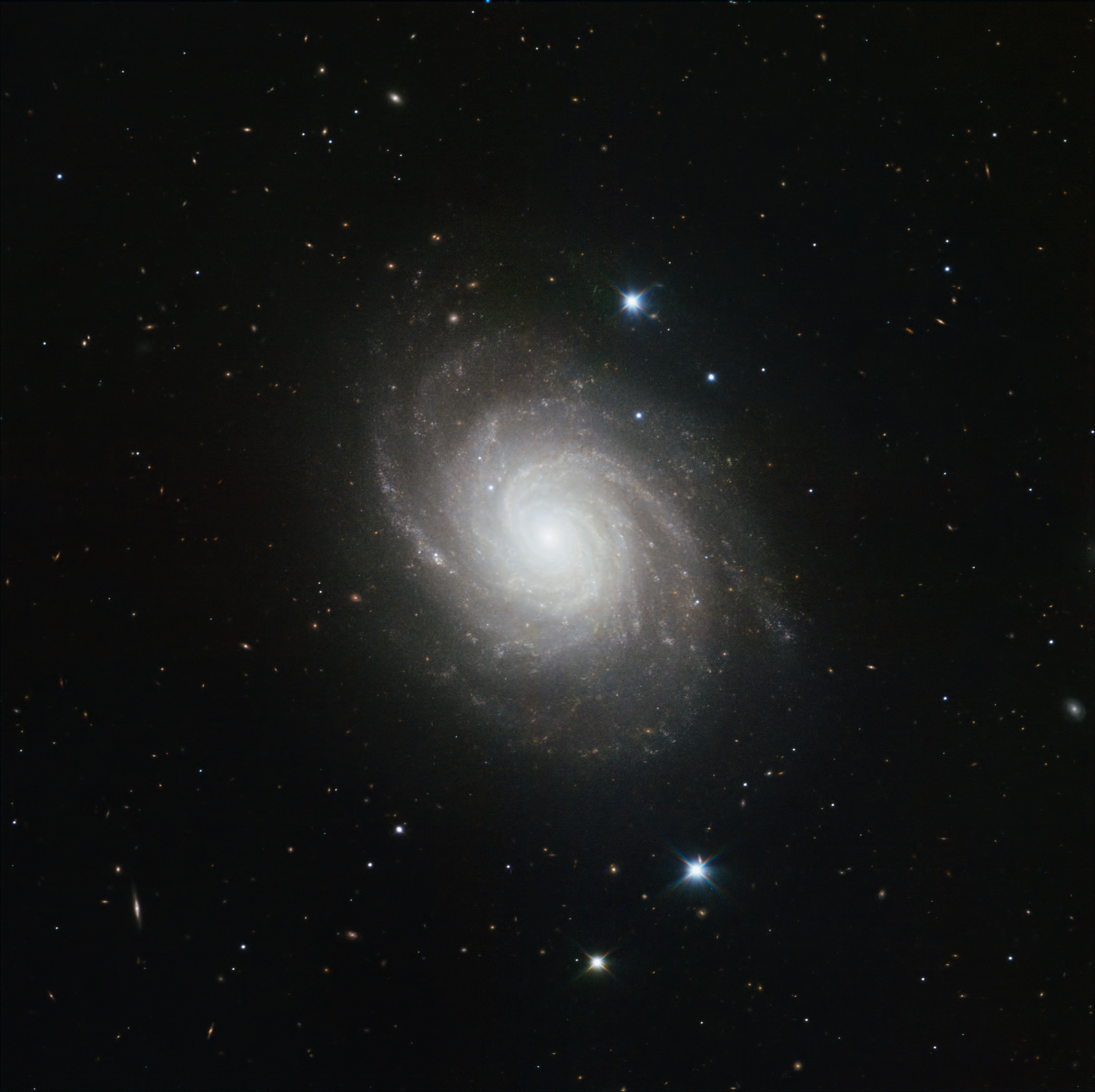
- Infrared view of NGC 4030 from the Very Large Telescope at Paranal Observatory in Chile

Observation data (J2000 epoch)
- Constellation: Virgo
- Right ascension: 12^{h} 00^{m} 23.643^{s}
- Declination: –01° 05′ 59.87″
- Heliocentric radial velocity: 1,465 km/s
- Distance: 63.6 ± 4.9 Mly (19.5 ± 1.5 Mpc)
- Apparent magnitude (V): 10.6

Characteristics
- Type: SA(s)bc
- Apparent size (V): 3′.8 × 2′.9

Other designations
- PGC 37845, UGC 6993

NGC 4030 is a grand design spiral galaxy located about 64 million light years away in the constellation Virgo. It is a member of the NGC 4030 Group of galaxies, which is a member of the Virgo II Groups, a series of galaxies and galaxy clusters strung out from the southern edge of the Virgo Supercluster. With an apparent visual magnitude of 10.6, it is visible with a small telescope as a 3 arc minute wide feature about 4.75° to the southeast of the star Beta Virginis. It is inclined by an angle of 47.1° to the line of sight from the Earth and is receding at a velocity of 1,465 km/s.

The morphological classification of NGC 4030 in the De Vaucouleurs system is SA(s)bc, which indicates a spiral structure (SA) with no bar (s) and moderate to loosely wound arms (bc). The inner part of the galaxy shows a complex structure with multiple spiral arms, which becomes a symmetric, double arm pattern beyond 49″ from the core. The central bulge is relatively young with an estimated age of two billion years, while the nucleus is inactive.

== Supernova ==
In 2007, a supernova explosion was discovered in the galaxy from images taken on February 19 from the 1 m Swope telescope at Las Campanas Observatory in Chile. Designated SN 2007aa, it was a Type IIP supernova positioned 68″.5 north and 60″.8 east of the galactic nucleus. The progenitor was a red giant star with 8.5–16.5 times the mass of the Sun.

== Gallery ==
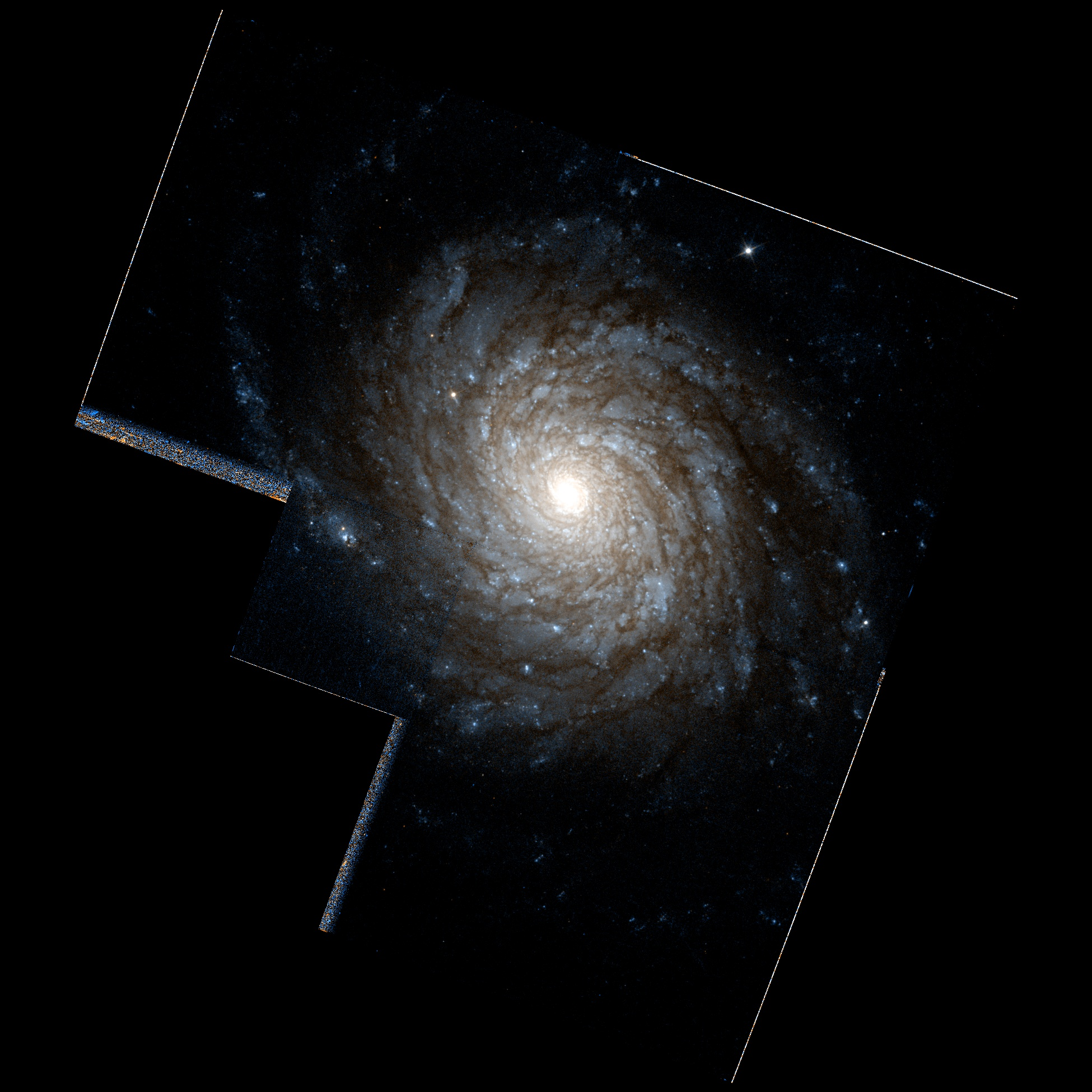
NGC 4030 imaged by the Hubble Space Telescope

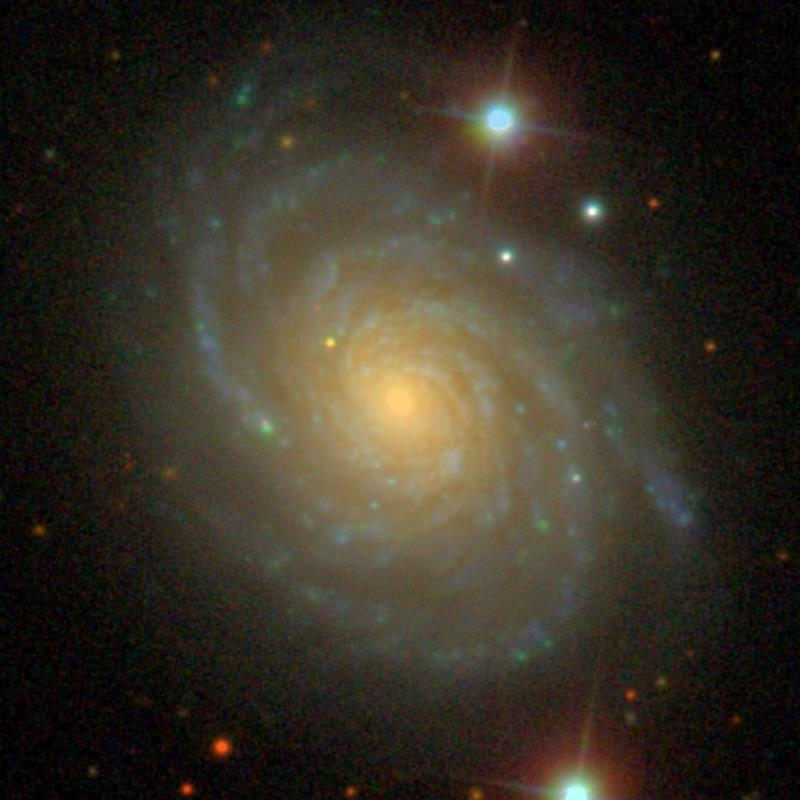
NGC 4030 (SDSS DR14)
