= NGC 4856 =

Galaxy in the constellation Virgo

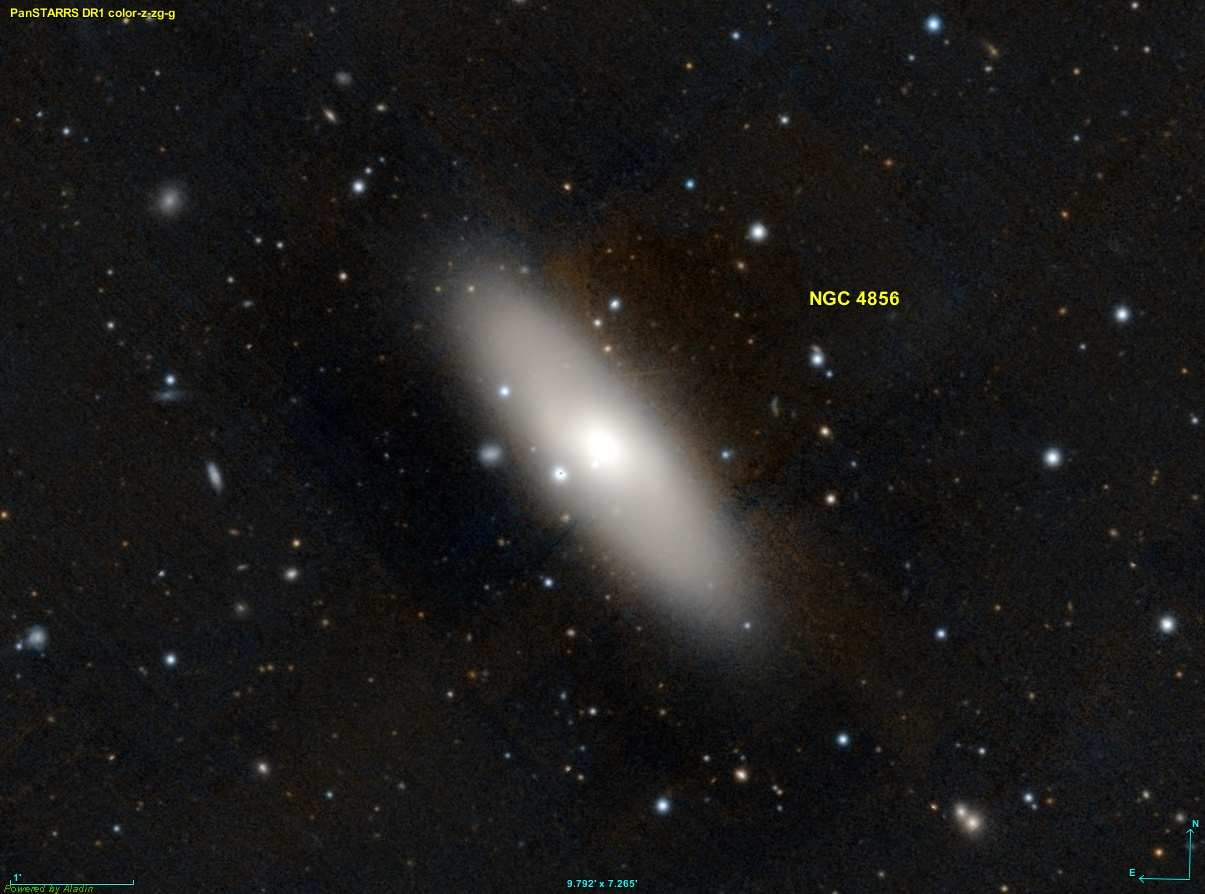
- NGC 4856 imaged by PanSTARRS

Observation data (J2000 epoch)
- Constellation: Virgo
- Right ascension: 12^{h} 59^{m} 21.2482^{s}
- Declination: −15° 02′ 31.153″
- Redshift: 0.004513 ± 0.000023
- Heliocentric radial velocity: 1,353 ± 7 km/s
- Distance: 73.5 ± 6.7 Mly (22.55 ± 2.05 Mpc)
- Group or cluster: NGC 4856 Group
- Apparent magnitude (V): 10.6

Characteristics
- Type: SB(s)0/a
- Size: ~91,000 ly (28 kpc) (estimated)
- Apparent size (V): 4.3′ × 1.2′

Other designations
- UGCA 313, MCG -02-33-078, PGC 44582

NGC 4856 is a barred lenticular galaxy in the constellation Virgo. The galaxy lies about 75 million light years away from Earth, which means, given its apparent dimensions, that NGC 4856 is approximately 90,000 light years across. It was discovered by William Herschel on February 8, 1785. The galaxy is included in the Herschel 400 Catalogue. It is small but obvious when observed by a telescope, appearing as a concentrated and elongated glow. It lies 3.25 degrees northwest of 53 Virginis.

NGC 4856 has a large and bright galactic bulge, with a bright elliptical nucleus. Eskridge et al didn't find signs of a bar, however data from the Spitzer Space Telescope indicate the bulge is X-shaped, which is indicative of a bar viewed at high inclination. Two smooth, low contrast spiral arms emerge from the bulge, but they quickly disappear in the symmetric and otherwise featureless disk. The galaxy is rich in hydrogen, with an estimated hydrogen mass of 10^{8.93} M_{☉}, however there is only H-alpha emission from the nucleus, indicating the disk lacks HII regions. In the center of the galaxy lies a supermassive black hole whose mass is estimated to be 10^{7.86 ± 0.19} (47 - 109 millions) M_{☉}.

NGC 4856 is the foremost galaxy of the NGC 4856 Group, also known as LGG 322. Other members of the group include the galaxies MCG -2-33-88, MCG -3-33-27, MCG -3-33-32, and MCG -2-33-82 according to A. M. Garcia, while Makarov et al consider the galaxies MGC -2-33-88 (DDO 159), MCG -2-33-82, and MCG -2-33-93. It is part of a Virgo II Groups, a chain of groups extending from the Virgo Cluster.
