= NGC 4701 =

Unbarred spiral galaxy in the constellation Virgo

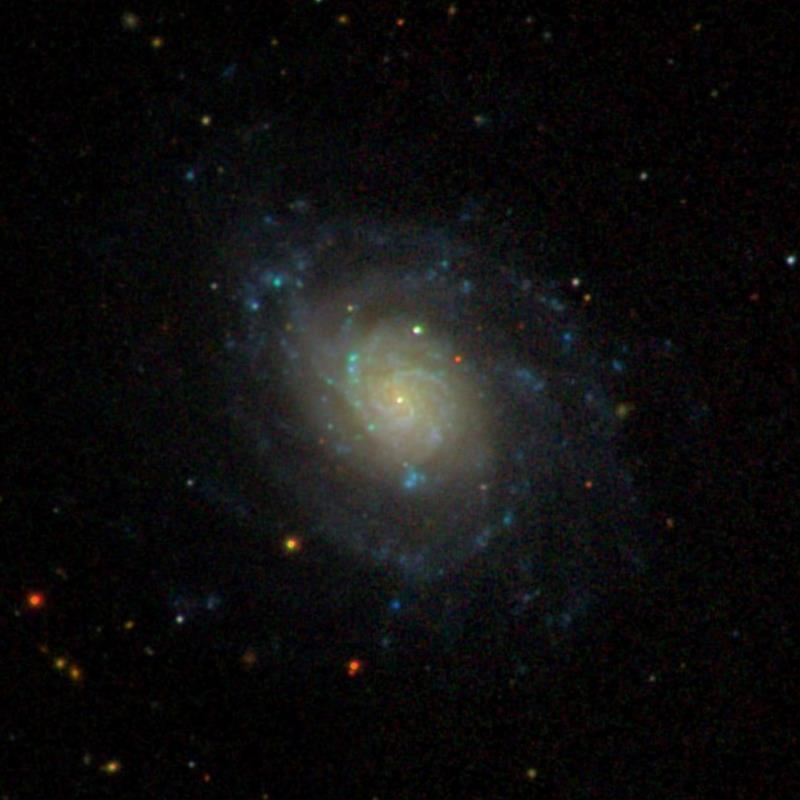
- SDSS image of NGC 4701

Observation data (J2000 epoch)
- Constellation: Virgo
- Right ascension: 12^{h} 49^{m} 11.59329^{s}
- Declination: +03° 23′ 19.3906″
- Redshift: 0.00251
- Heliocentric radial velocity: 752 km/s
- Distance: 50.9 ± 3.3 Mly (15.6 ± 1.0 Mpc)
- Group or cluster: M49 Group (LGG 292)
- Apparent magnitude (B): 13.1

Characteristics
- Type: SA(s)cd
- Size: ~75,700 ly (23.22 kpc) (estimated)
- Apparent size (V): 2.8′ × 2.1′

Other designations
- IRAS 12466+0339, UGC 7975, MCG +01-33-015, PGC 43331, CGCG 043-034

NGC 4701 is an unbarred spiral galaxy located in the constellation Virgo. Its velocity with respect to the cosmic microwave background is 1054 ± 24 km/s, which corresponds to a Hubble distance of 50.7 ± 3.8 Mly (15.54 ± 1.15 Mpc). However, 10 non-redshift measurements give a greater distance of 72.31 ± 6.14 Mly (22.170 ± 1.883 Mpc). It was discovered by the German-British astronomer William Herschel on 30 April 1786 using a 47.5 cm (18.7 inch) diameter mirror type telescope. It is a member of the Virgo II Groups, a series of galaxies and galaxy clusters strung out from the southern edge of the Virgo Supercluster.

NGC 4701 is a member of the M49 Group (also known as LGG 292). This group contains at least 127 galaxies, including 63 galaxies from the New General Catalogue and 20 galaxies from the Index Catalogue.

== See also ==
- List of NGC objects (4001–5000)
