= NGC 4546 =

Galaxy in the constellation Virgo

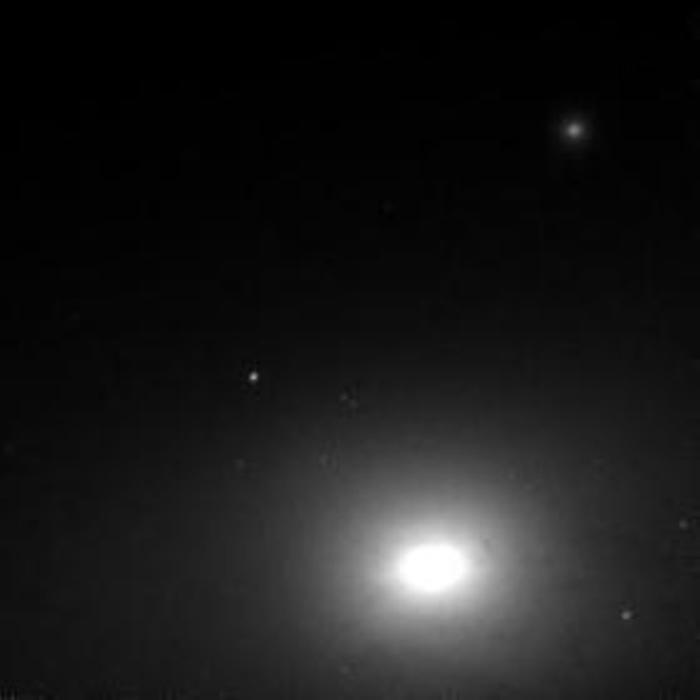
- NGC 4546 – Hubble Space Telescope – Hubble Legacy Archive

Observation data (J2000.0 epoch)
- Constellation: Virgo
- Right ascension: 12^{h} 35^{m} 29.5^{s}
- Declination: −03° 47′ 35.5″
- Redshift: 0.003492
- Heliocentric radial velocity: 1,057±5 km/s
- Distance: 45.6 Mly (14.0 Mpc)
- Apparent magnitude (V): 10.57

Characteristics
- Type: SB0^{−}
- Apparent size (V): 5.2′ × 4.2′

Other designations
- NGC 4546, UGCA 288, MCG -1-32-27, PGC 41939

NGC 4546 is a lenticular field galaxy located in the direction of the constellation Virgo, with a total population of globular clusters estimated at 390. It is a member of the Virgo II Groups, a series of galaxies and galaxy clusters strung out from the southern edge of the Virgo Supercluster.

Located 45.6 million light years away, with a stellar mass of about 27 billion solar masses, it has a declination of −03° 47' 35" and an average rise of 12 hours, 35 minutes and 29.5 seconds. NGC 4546 was discovered on December 29, 1786 by William Herschel.

The galaxy appears to be home to a supermassive black hole with a mass of 256 million (± 16 million) times the mass of the Sun. It is estimated to have 390±60 globular clusters.

NGC 4546 appears to have at least 2 companions, NGC 4546-UCD1 and CGCG 014-074.
