= NGC 4469 =

Spiral galaxy in the constellation of Virgo

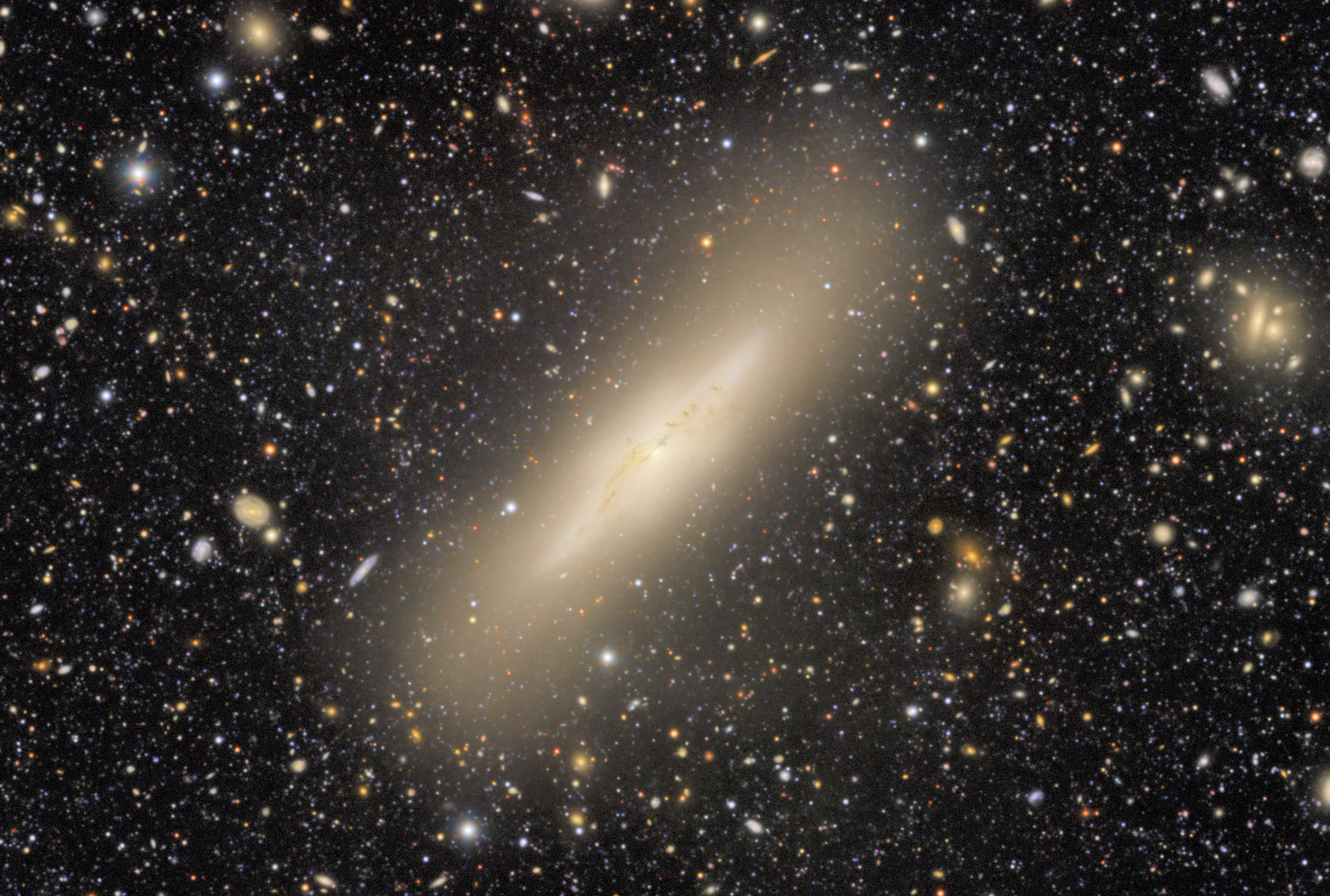
- NGC 4469 imaged by the Vera C. Rubin Observatory

Observation data (J2000 epoch)
- Constellation: Virgo
- Right ascension: 12^{h} 29^{m} 28.0300^{s}
- Declination: +08° 45′ 00.622″
- Redshift: 0.001962±0.00000803
- Heliocentric radial velocity: 588±2 km/s
- Distance: 54.63 ± 0.16 Mly (16.750 ± 0.050 Mpc)
- Group or cluster: Virgo Cluster
- Apparent magnitude (V): 12.0

Characteristics
- Type: SB(s)0/a, LINER
- Size: ~68,000 ly (20.85 kpc) (estimated)
- Apparent size (V): 2.50′ × 1.04′

Other designations
- VCC 1190, IRAS 12269+0901, UGC 7622, MCG +02-32-089, PGC 41164, CGCG 070-121

NGC 4469 is a nearly edge-on spiral galaxy located about 55 million light-years away in the constellation of Virgo. It is also classified as a LINER galaxy. NGC 4469 was discovered by German-British astronomer William Herschel on April 15, 1784. It is a member of the Virgo Cluster.

== Physical characteristics ==
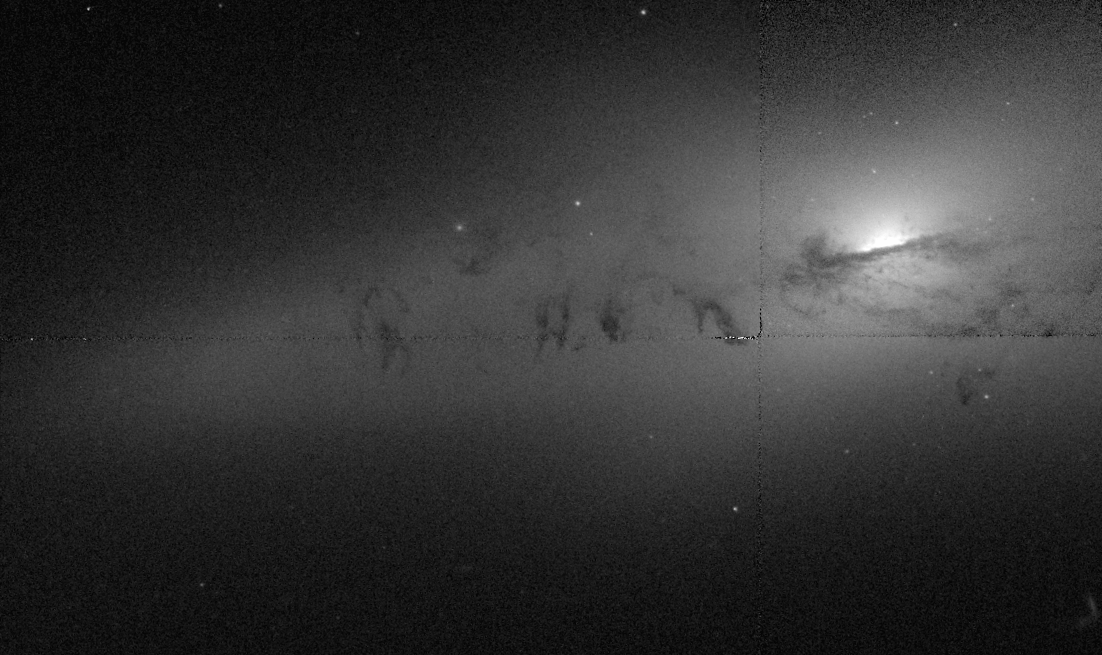
HST image of NGC 4469 showing filaments of dust and a distinct peanut shaped bulge.

NGC 4469 has an X or peanut-shaped bulge, betraying the presence of a bar which generates such structures. NGC 4469 may also have an axisymmetric structure.

=== Dust Lanes ===
NGC 4469 has dust lanes that cross the Earth's line of sight.

== See also ==
- List of NGC objects (4001–5000)
- NGC 4013
- NGC 4710- a similar looking spiral galaxy in Coma Berenices
