= NGC 5087 =

Elliptical galaxy in the constellation Virgo

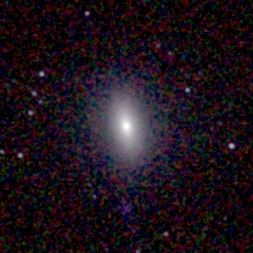
- A near-infrared image of NGC 5087.

Observation data (J2000 epoch)
- Constellation: Virgo
- Right ascension: 13^{h} 20^{m} 24.9^{s}
- Declination: −20° 36′ 40″
- Redshift: 1832 ± 56 km/s
- Apparent magnitude (V): 13.1

Characteristics
- Type: E^{+}
- Apparent size (V): 2.3′ × 1.7′

Other designations
- ESO 576- G 035, IRAS 13177-2021, UGCA 350, MCG -03-34-050, PGC 46541

NGC 5087 is an elliptical galaxy located in the constellation Virgo. It was discovered on April 8, 1788 by the astronomer William Herschel. It is a member of the NGC 5084 Group of galaxies, which is a member of the Virgo II Groups, a series of galaxies and galaxy clusters strung out from the southern edge of the Virgo Supercluster.
