= NGC 4790 =

Galaxy in the constellation Virgo

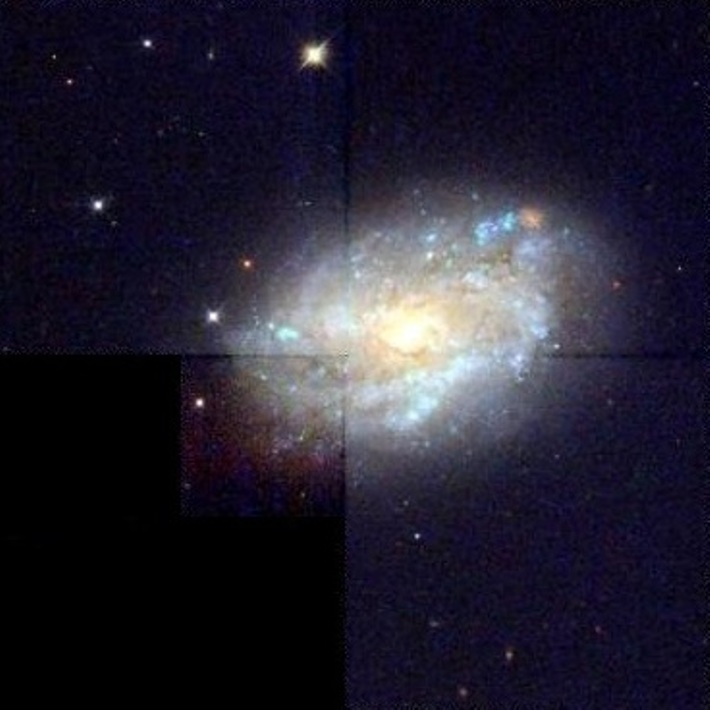
- NGC 4790 imaged by the Hubble Space Telescope

Observation data (J2000 epoch)
- Constellation: Virgo
- Right ascension: 12^{h} 54^{m} 51.956^{s}
- Declination: −10° 14′ 52.2″
- Redshift: 0.004483
- Heliocentric radial velocity: 1344 ± 5 km/s
- Distance: 80.8 ± 5.8 Mly (24.76 ± 1.77 Mpc)
- Group or cluster: NGC 4699 Group
- Apparent magnitude (V): 12.4

Characteristics
- Type: SB(rs)c?
- Size: ~45,500 ly (13.95 kpc) (estimated)
- Apparent size (V): 1.55′ × 1.0′

Other designations
- IRAS 12522-0958, MCG -02-33-056, PGC 43972

NGC 4790 is a barred spiral galaxy located in the constellation of Virgo. Its velocity with respect to the cosmic microwave background is 1,679 ± 24 km/s (1,043 ± 15 mi/s), which corresponds to a Hubble distance of 80.8 ± 5.8 Mly (24.76 ± 1.77 Mpc) away from the Solar System. In addition, six non-redshift measurements give a distance of 74.75 ± 4.07 Mly (22.917 ± 1.249 Mpc). NGC 4790 was discovered on 25 March 1786 by German-British astronomer William Herschel.

NGC 4790 is a member of the NGC 4699 Group (also known as LGG 307) of galaxies, which is a member of the Virgo II Groups, a series of galaxies and galaxy clusters strung out from the southern edge of the Virgo Supercluster.

== Astronomical transients ==
One astronomical transient event has been observed in NGC 4790: the supernova SN 2012au (Type Ib, mag. 13.8), which was discovered by the Catalina Sky Survey on 14 March 2012. This supernova later produced evidence of a pulsar wind nebula which appears to be expanding outward at approximately 2,300 km/s (1,400 mi/s).

== Gallery ==
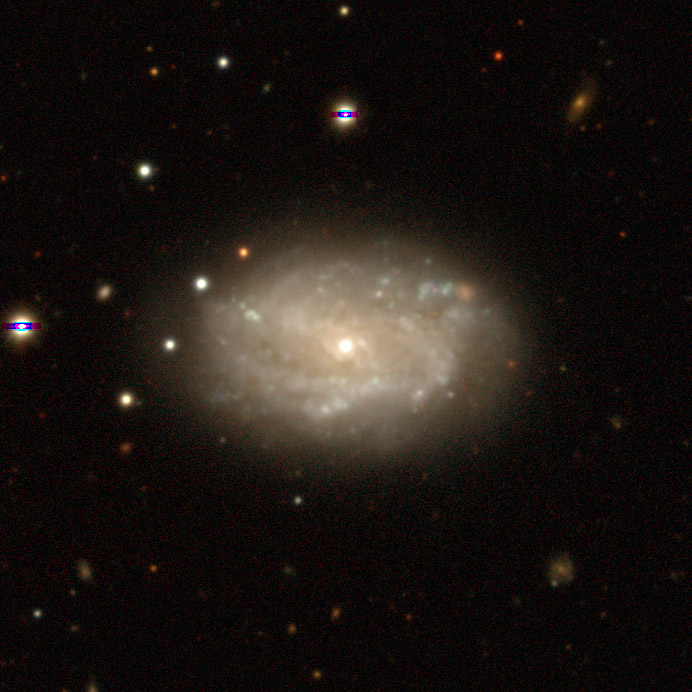
Image from Legacy Surveys DR10.

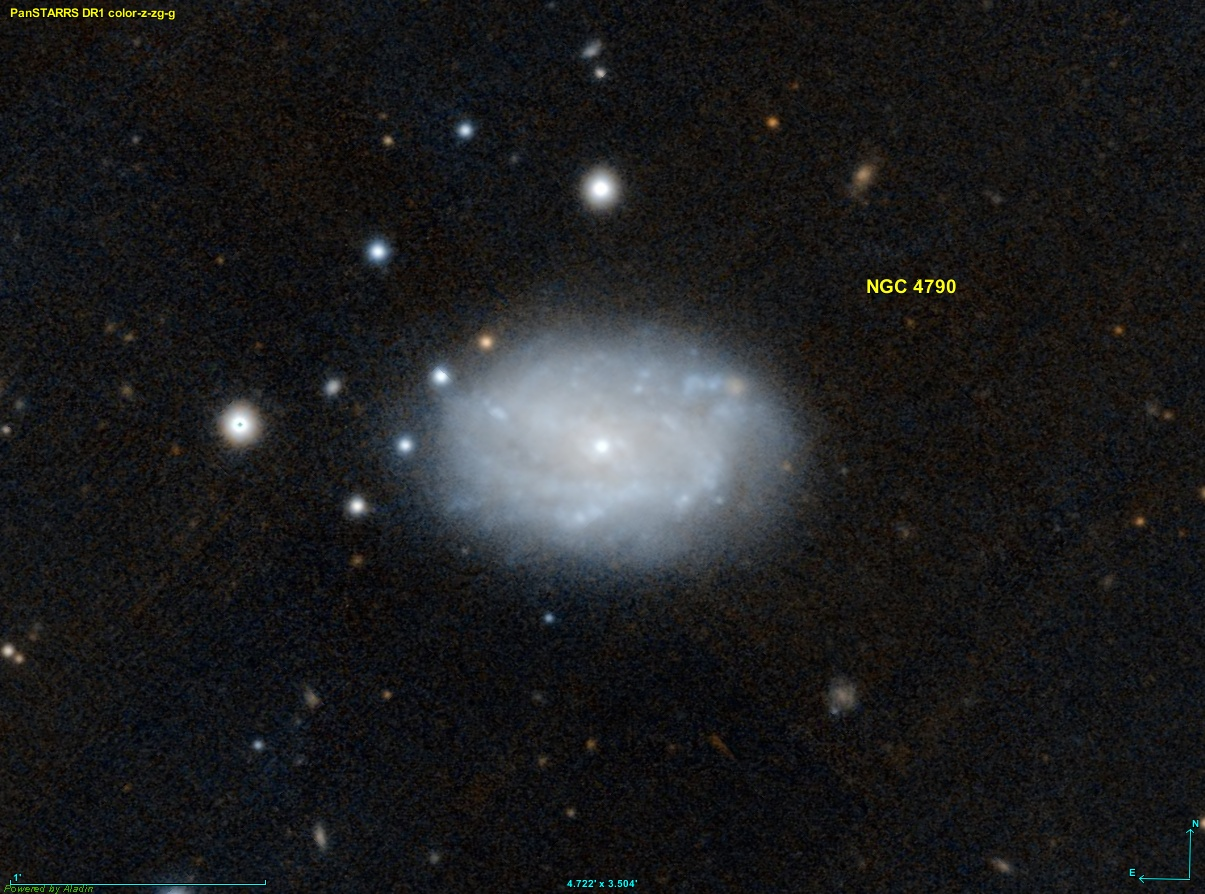
Image created using the Aladin Sky Atlas software from the Strasbourg Astronomical Data Center and Pan-STARRS.

== See also ==
- List of NGC objects (4001–5000)
