= NGC 4995 =

Galaxy in the constellation of Virgo

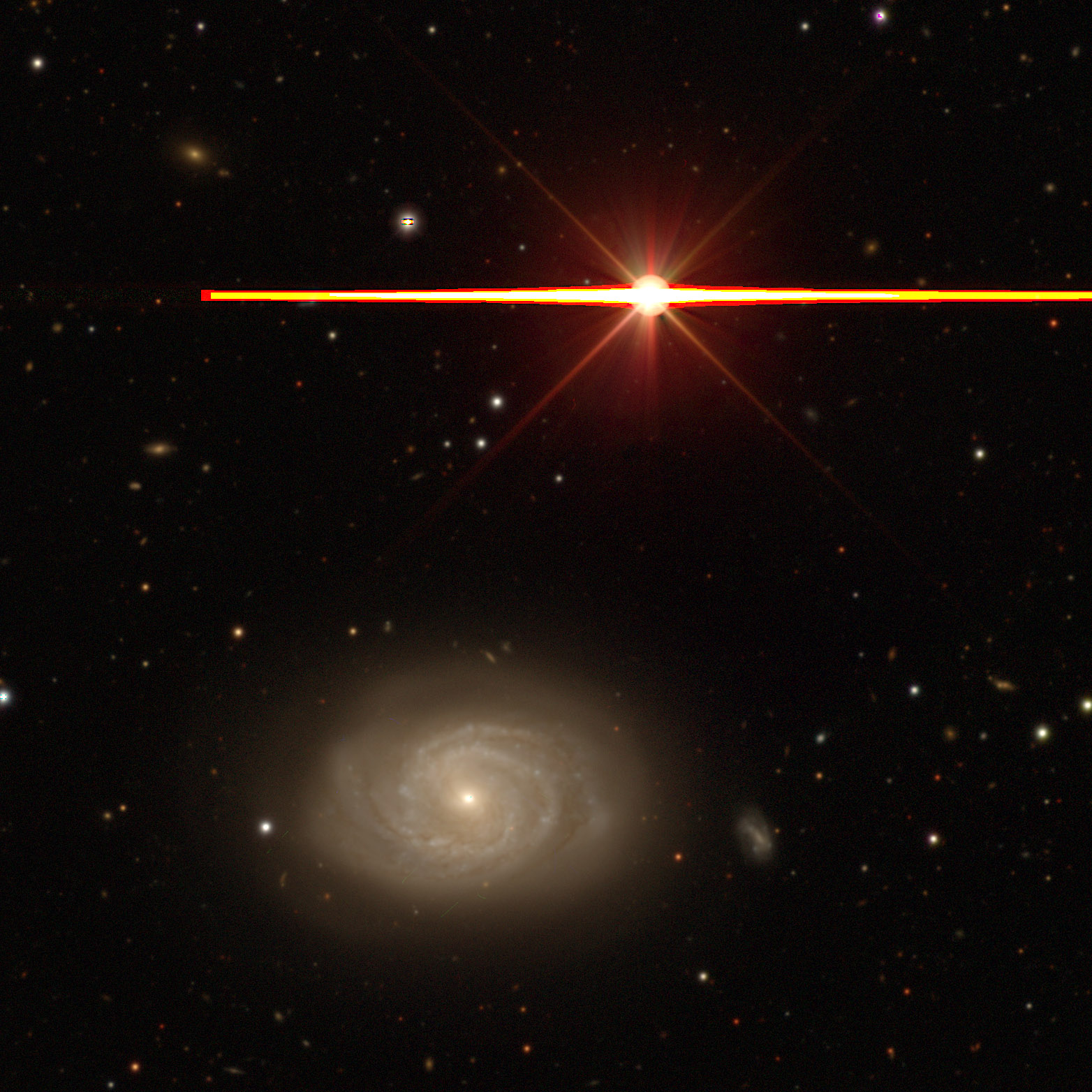
- legacy surveys image of NGC 4995, with KY Virginis above (red star)

Observation data (J2000 epoch)
- Constellation: Virgo
- Right ascension: 13^{h} 09^{m} 40.6390105944^{s}
- Declination: −07° 50′ 00.223871892″
- Distance: 85 Mly (26 Mpc)
- Apparent magnitude (V): 11.2
- Apparent magnitude (B): 12.0

Characteristics
- Type: SAB(r)b D 2013MNRAS.431.3060E

Other designations
- UGCA 329, MCG -01-34-007, PGC 45643

NGC 4995 is a "moderately bright and large galaxy" in the constellation Virgo. It is a member of the NGC 4995 Group of galaxies, which is a member of the Virgo II Groups, a series of galaxies and galaxy clusters strung out from the southern edge of the Virgo Supercluster.

One supernova has been observed in NGC 4995. SN 2023gfo (Type II, mag 16.192) was discovered by ATLAS on 20 April 2023.

== Gallery ==
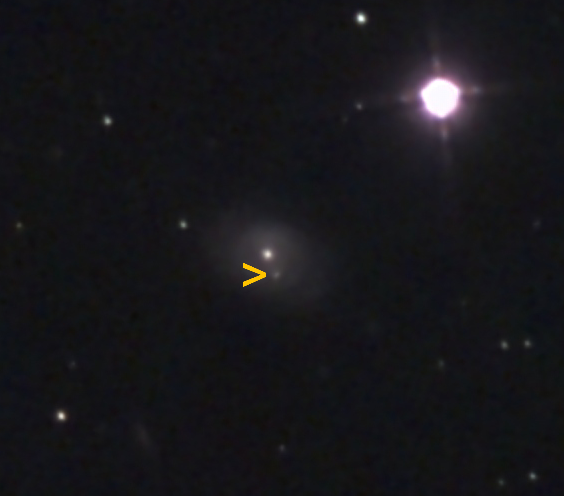
Supernova 2023gfo in NGC 4995 as seen on 2023-04-21 10:17 UT.

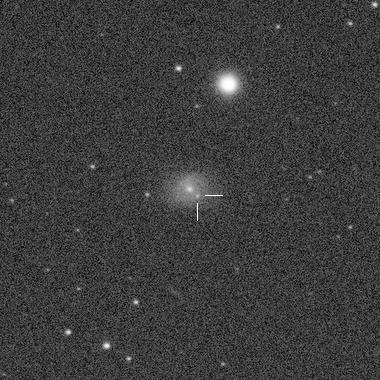
Supernova 2023gfo in NGC 4995 imaged UTC 2023-04-24T03:06
