= NGC 4700 =

Spiral galaxy in the constellation Virgo

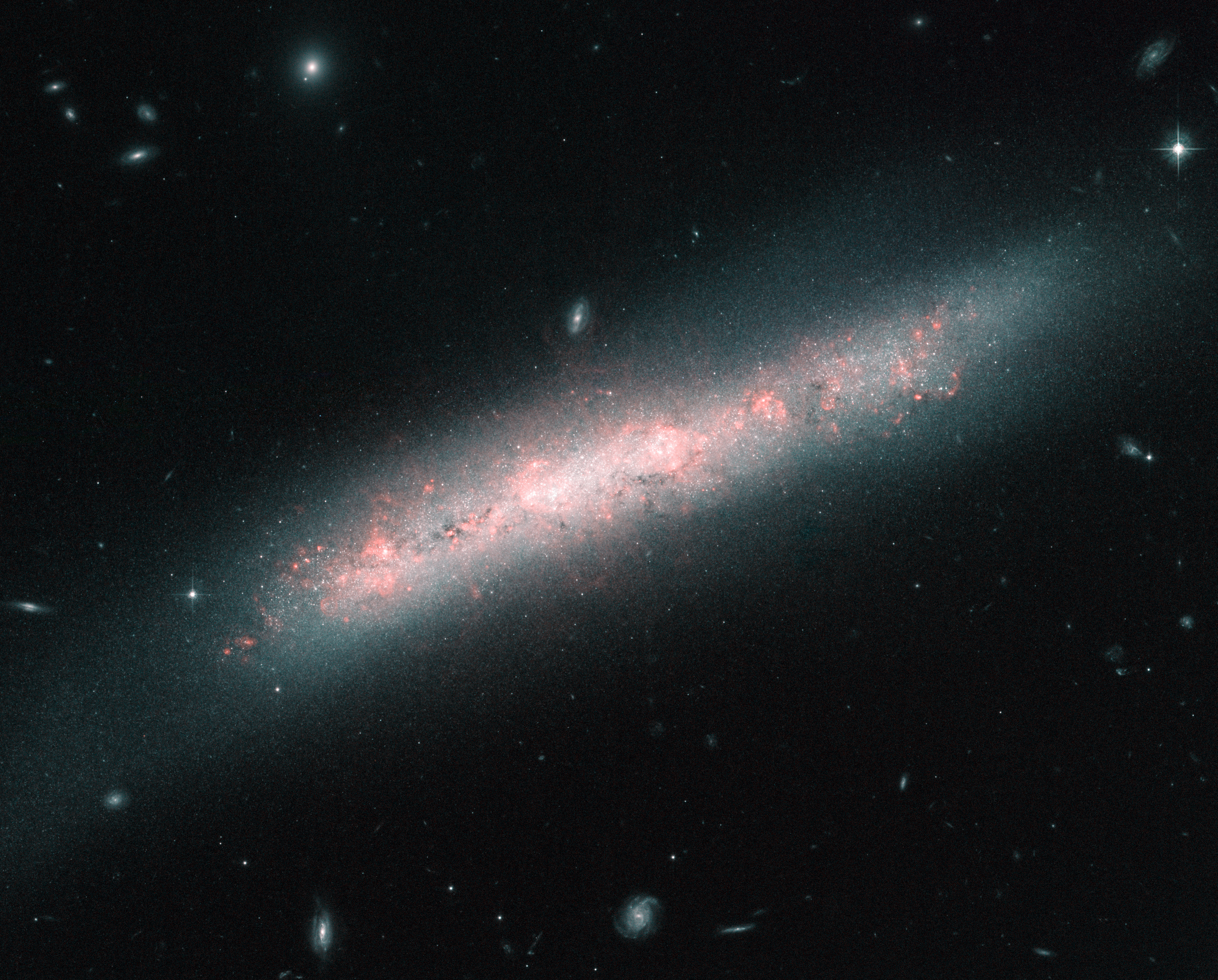
- The galaxy NGC 4700 bears the signs of the vigorous birth of many new stars.

Observation data (J2000 epoch)
- Constellation: Virgo
- Right ascension: 12^{h} 49^{m} 08.148^{s}
- Declination: −11° 24′ 35.48″
- Redshift: 0.00480
- Heliocentric radial velocity: 1435 km/s
- Distance: 29.40 ± 21.72 Mly (9.013 ± 6.658 Mpc)
- Apparent magnitude (V): 14.32
- Apparent magnitude (B): 12.7

Characteristics
- Type: SB(s)c
- Apparent size (V): 3.09′ (major axis)

Other designations
- MGC-02-33-013, PGC 43330

NGC 4700 is a spiral galaxy located about 50 million light years away in the constellation of Virgo. NGC 4700 was discovered in March 1786 by the British astronomer William Herschel who noted it as a "very faint nebula". It is a member of the NGC 4699 Group of galaxies, which is a member of the Virgo II Groups, a series of galaxies and galaxy clusters strung out from the southern edge of the Virgo Supercluster.

NGC 4700 was imaged by the Hubble Space Telescope in 2012, showing an abundance of star-forming regions similar to the Orion Nebula.

== Gallery ==
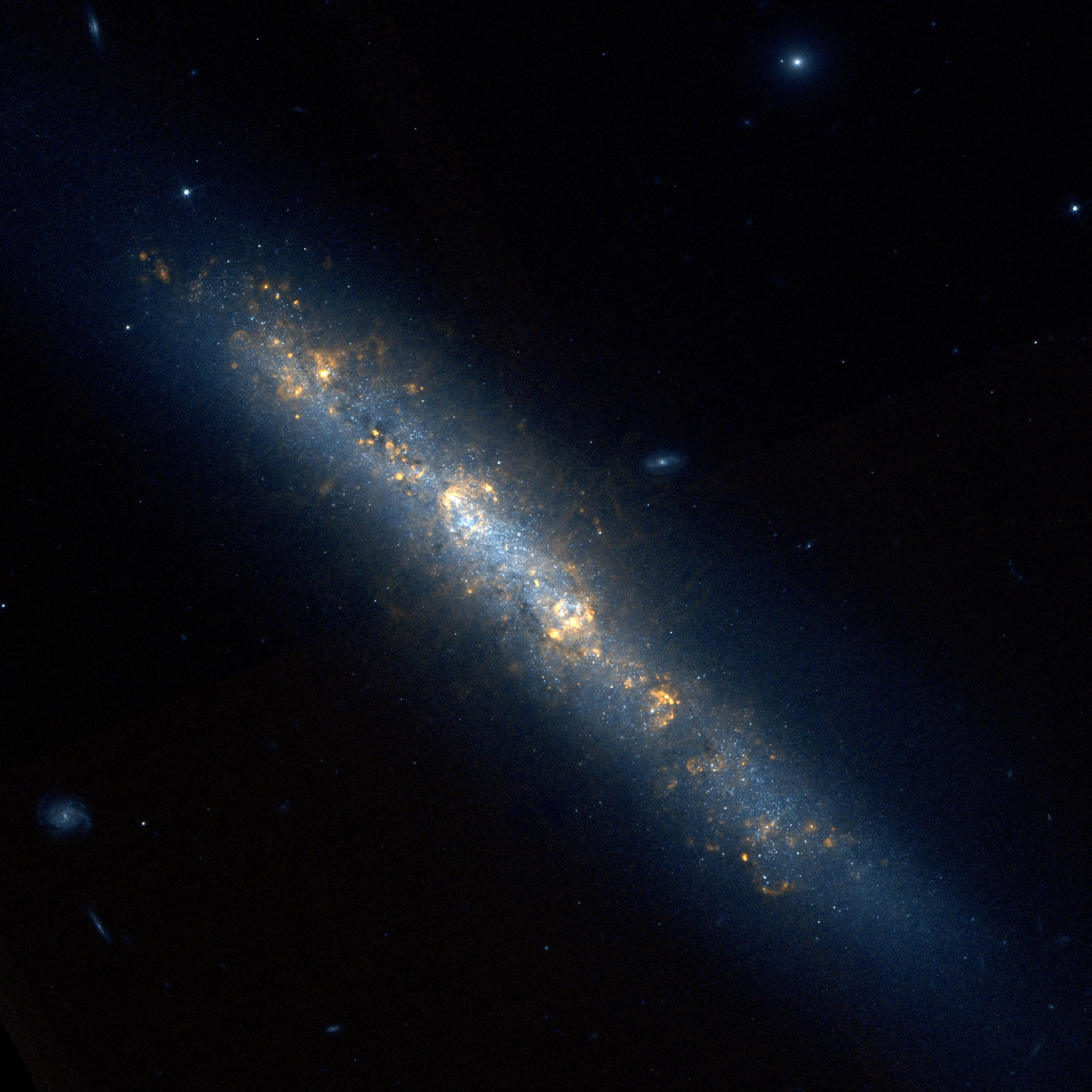
NGC 4700 by Hubble Space Telescope

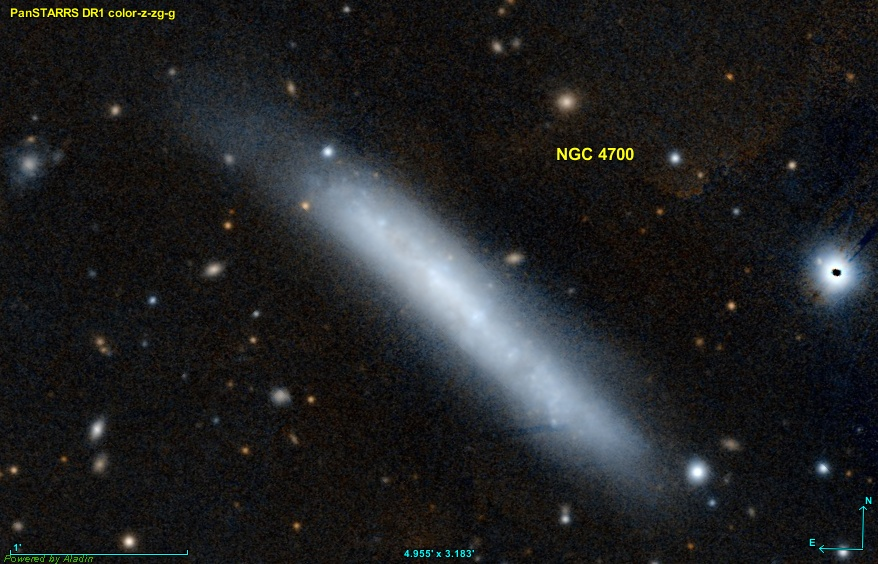
Pan-STARRS image of NGC 4700
