= NGC 4781 =

Galaxy in the constellation Virgo

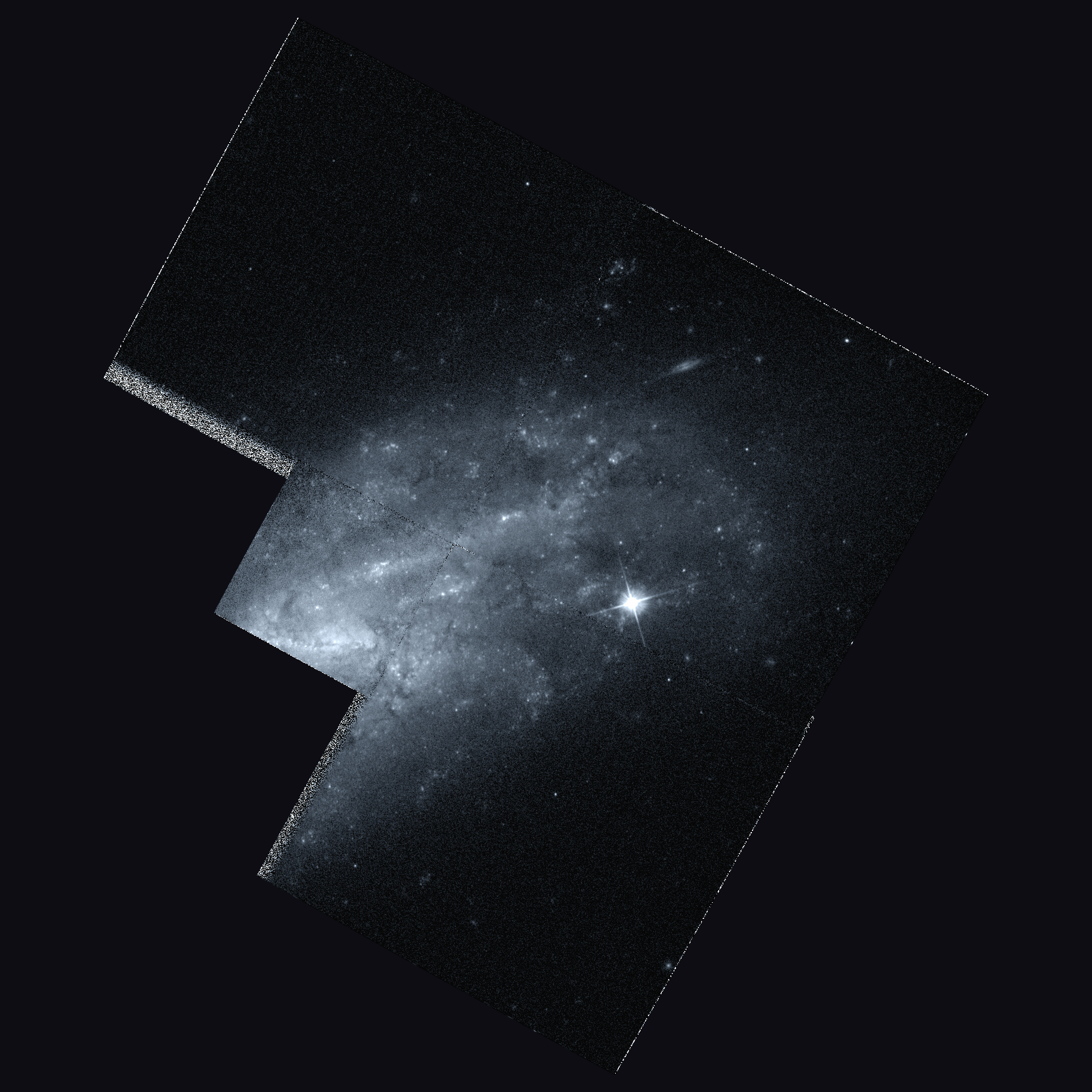
- Hubble Space Telescope image of NGC 4781

Observation data (J2000 epoch)
- Constellation: Virgo
- Right ascension: 12^{h} 54^{m} 23^{s}
- Declination: −10° 32′ 13″
- Redshift: 0000
- Heliocentric radial velocity: 000 ± 0 km/s
- Apparent magnitude (B): 11.8

Characteristics
- Type: SB(rs)d

Other designations
- NGC 4781, LEDA 43902, IRAS 12517-1015

NGC 4781 is a barred spiral galaxy in the constellation Virgo. It was discovered by William Herschel on Mar 25, 1786. It is a member of the NGC 4699 Group of galaxies, which is a member of the Virgo II Groups, a series of galaxies and galaxy clusters strung out from the southern edge of the Virgo Supercluster.

== See also ==
- List of NGC objects (4001–5000)
