= NGC 747 =

Galaxy in the constellation Cetus

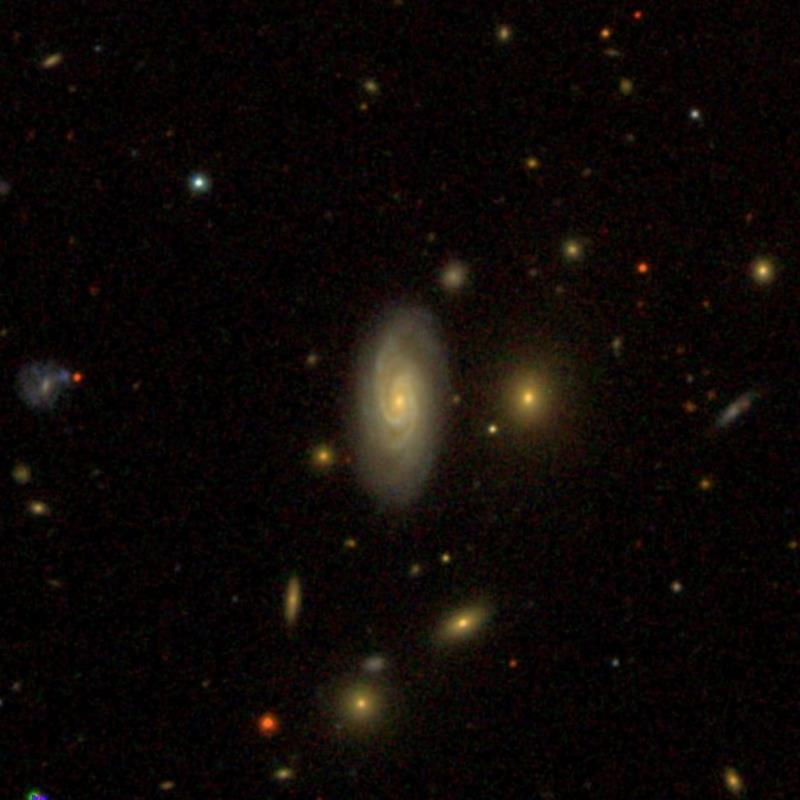
- NGC 747 (SDSS DR14)

Observation data (J2000 epoch)
- Constellation: Cetus
- Right ascension: 01h 57m 29s
- Declination: -09° 27′ 45″
- Redshift: 0.0179
- Apparent magnitude (B): 14
- Surface brightness: 23.05 mag/arcsec2

Other designations
- PGC 7366, 2MASX J01573044-0927444, MCG -02-06-007, SDSS J015730.45-092744.5

NGC 747 is a spiral galaxy located in the constellation Cetus. Its speed relative to the cosmic microwave background is 5,100 ± 19 km/s, which corresponds to a Hubble distance of 75.2 ± 5.3 Mpc (~245 million ly). NGC 747 was discovered by American astronomer Francis Leavenworth in 1886. The luminosity class of NGC 747 is II and it has a broad HI line. To date, four non-redshift measurements yield a distance of 83.900 ± 4.166 Mpc (~274 million ly), which is within the Hubble distance range. Note, however, that it is with the average value of independent measurements, when they exist, that the NASA/IPAC database calculates the diameter of a galaxy and that consequently the diameter of NGC 747 could be approximately 23 .9 kpc (~78,000 ly). In the same area of the sky there are, among other things: the galaxies NGC 713, NGC 731, NGC 755 and NGC 767.

== See also ==
- List of NGC objects (1–1000)
- Lists of galaxies
- Galaxy cluster
