= NGC 4665 =

Galaxy in the constellation of Virgo

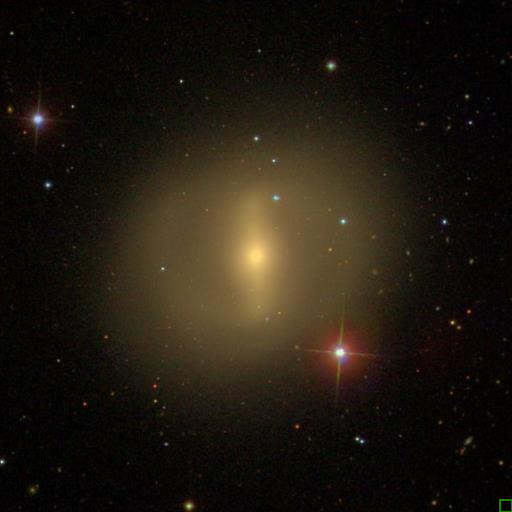
- NGC 4665 by SDSS

Observation data (J2000 epoch)
- Constellation: Virgo
- Right ascension: 12^{h} 45^{m} 06^{s}
- Declination: +03° 03′ 21″
- Redshift: 0.003042±0.000017
- Heliocentric radial velocity: 912±5 km/s
- Distance: 58 Mly (18 Mpc)
- Apparent magnitude (V): 10.3

Characteristics
- Type: SB(s)0/a
- Apparent size (V): 3.5′ × 3.5′

Other designations
- NGC 4665, 4624, 4664, UGC 7924, MCG +01-33-005, PGC 42970, CGCG 043-018

NGC 4665, also catalogued as NGC 4624 and NGC 4664, is a barred lenticular or spiral galaxy located in the constellation Virgo. It is a member of the Virgo II Groups, a series of galaxies and galaxy clusters strung out from the southern edge of the Virgo Supercluster. It is located at a distance of circa 60 million light years from Earth, which, given its apparent dimensions, means that NGC 4665 is about 75,000 light years across. NGC 4665 lies 2 and 3/4 degrees east-south east of Delta Virginis and 50 arcminutes southwest of 35 Virginis. It can be viewed through a moderately sized telescope with 23x magnification, forming a pair with an 11th magnitude star 1.5 arcminutes southwest. It is part of the Herschel 400 Catalogue.

== Observation history ==
It was discovered by William Herschel on February 23, 1784, however, he noted a location 10 arcminutes off the galaxy, where there is no object. It was observed by William Herschel again on April 30, 1786, noting the correct coordinates, and he misidentified it as another nebula. The fact that they are the same object was noted by John Louis Emil Dreyer in 1912 in the corrections of the New General Catalogue. It was also recorded independently on April 9, 1828 by John Herschel.

== Physical characteristics ==
NGC 4665 has a luminous, slightly elliptical bulge and a prominent bar with high surface brightness. The isophotes appear boxy at the end of the bar. The total bar length is estimated to be near 3 kpc. The bar is slightly twisted, turning near 12 degrees along its axis. Two diffuse, faint arms emerge from each side of the bar and form a pseudoring. The surface brightness of the arms is higher near the bar. The southern arm appears a bit stronger. An arch feature is observed at the east side of the galaxy that could be a partial outer dusty ring. The outer isophotes are elliptical. The total mass of molecular gas is less than 10^{7.3} M_{☉}.

NGC 4665 belongs to the NGC 4636 group. Other members of the group include NGC 4457, NGC 4586, NGC 4587, NGC 4600, NGC 4636, and NGC 4688. These galaxies, along with NGC 4753, Messier 61 and their groups form the southern boundary of the Virgo Cluster. It can be difficult to determine which galaxies belong to which group, especially around the southern edge of the Virgo cluster where there is a confusion of galaxies at different distances.
