= NGC 4636 =

Galaxy in the constellation Virgo

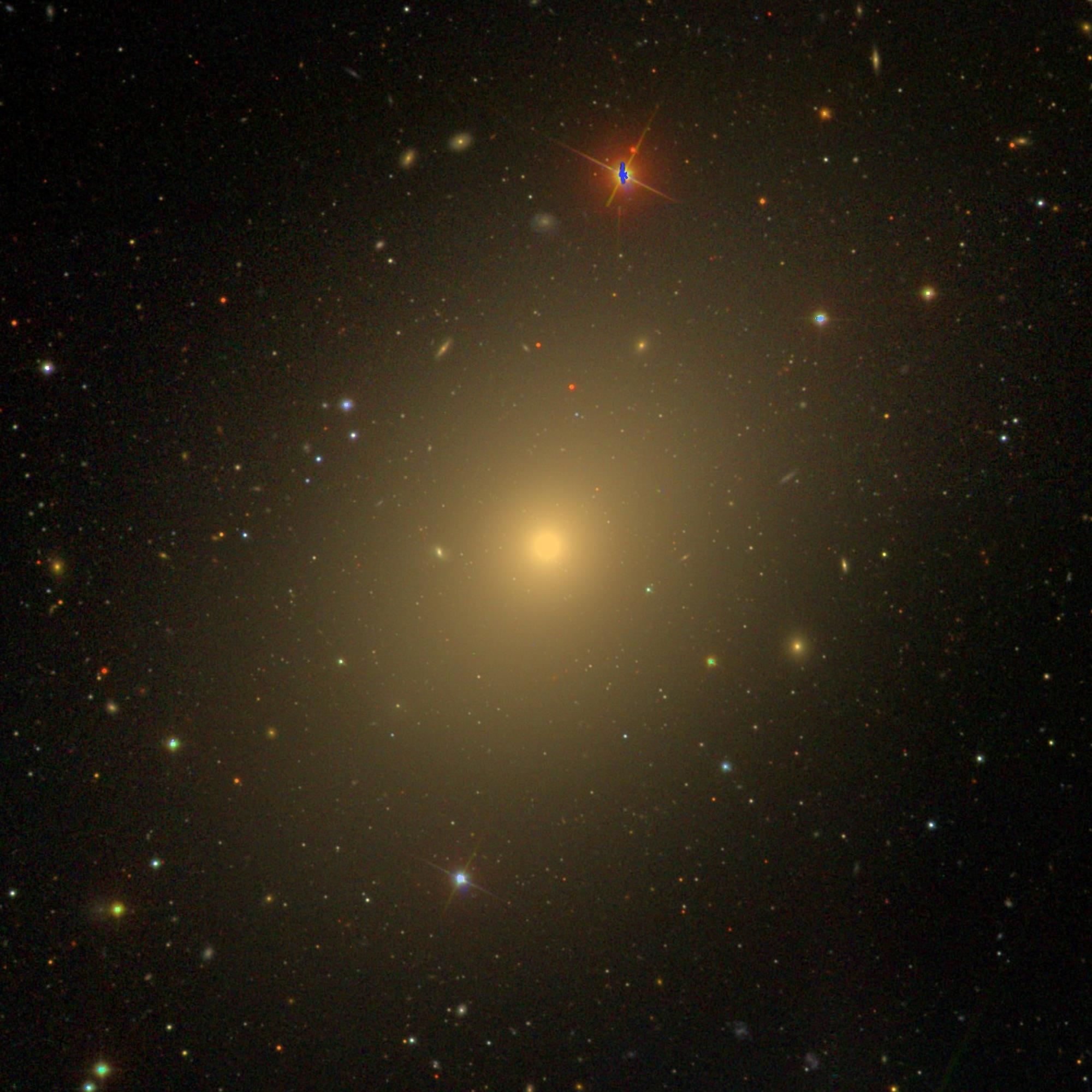
- Elliptical galaxy NGC 4636 imaged by SDSS

Observation data (J2000 epoch)
- Constellation: Virgo
- Right ascension: 12^{h} 42^{m} 49.8264^{s}
- Declination: +02° 41′ 16.08″
- Redshift: 0.003129±0.000014
- Heliocentric radial velocity: 938±4 km/s
- Distance: 53 ± 11 Mly (16.2 ± 3.4 Mpc)
- Apparent magnitude (V): 9.4

Characteristics
- Type: E/S0_1
- Apparent size (V): 10.4′ × 5.9′
- Notable features: Strong X-ray source

Other designations
- NGC 4636, UGC 7878, MCG +01-32-137, PGC 42734, CGCG 043–002

NGC 4636 is an elliptical galaxy located in the constellation of Virgo. It is a member of the NGC 4753 Group of galaxies, which is a member of the Virgo II Groups, a series of galaxies and galaxy clusters strung out from the southern edge of the Virgo Supercluster. It is located at a distance of about 55 million light years from Earth, which, given its apparent dimensions, means that NGC 4636 is about 105,000 light years across.

It was discovered by William Herschel on February 23, 1784. NGC 4636 lies one and a half degrees southwest of Delta Virginis. It can be viewed through a telescope at a ×23 magnification as a bright oval glow. It is part of the Herschel 400 Catalogue.

== Characteristics ==
The central part of NGC 4636 is circular and is surrounded by an elongated fainter envelope, containing a large number of globular clusters. The galaxy has an active galactic nucleus (AGN) that has been categorised as LINER or a type 1.9 Seyfert galaxy. The source of nuclear activity in galaxies is suggested to be a supermassive black hole that accretes material. NGC 4636 harbors a relatively small supermassive black hole with mass 7.9×10^{7} M_{☉}, as inferred from the bulge velocity dispersion.

=== Molecular gas ===
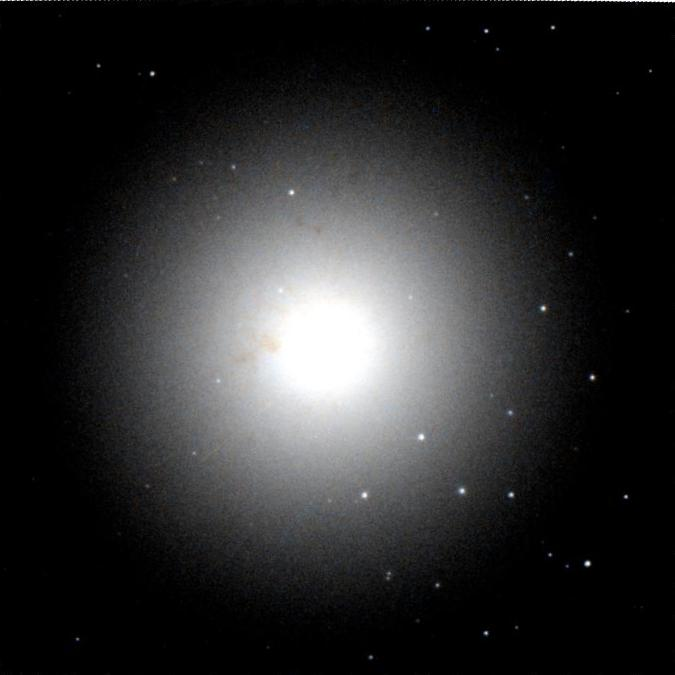
NGC 4636 by Hubble Space Telescope

When imaged in CO(2–1) there appear molecular clouds in NGC 4636. Cloud 1 is not associated with detectable optical emission and is out of the dust extinction map field of view, while cloud 2 is centered on a dust absorption knot and aligned with a ridge in the optical line emission map. The faint NGC 4636 ALMA continuum is in good agreement with the expected emission from cold dust, which would indicate that the dust content of NGC 4636 is fairly centrally located. The associated total molecular mass is 2.6×10^{5} M_{☉}.

The ultraviolet emission of NGC 4636 exhibits O vi emission, which is a tracer of gas cooling. The measured emission indicates a cooling rate of 0.3 M⊙ yr−1. Polycyclic aromatic hydrocarbons (PAH) emission was detected at 11.3 and 17 μm, as well as [Ne ii], [Ne iii], and [S iii] lines in the center of NGC 4636 (within re/8) using the Spitzer IRS. The far infrared emission of the galaxy, as observed by the Infrared Space Observatory is 50 times more than expected based on stellar emission alone. This strongly suggests that there is dust, probably accreted in a recent merger with a gas-rich galaxy. Hα observations reveal the presence of warm (T ~ 104 K) ionized gas in the inner kpc of NGC 4636. Spectra of this gas indicate irregular motion, with a typical velocity of 150–200 km/s. Hα maps of the galaxy core show the presence of a cavity in the distribution of the ionized gas encircled by a dense shell located at a distance of ~400 pc from the center. Again, the most plausible explanation is gas expansion caused by AGN activity.

In NGC 4636, the [C ii] emission extends to a radius of ~1 kpc and is centrally peaked. The velocities inferred from the [C ii] line are consistent with those measured for the Hα line. Finally, NGC 4636 has an excess of cold dust, approximately cospatial with the ionized and molecular gas. As above, this dust is expected be embedded in cold gas, to be protected against rapid sputtering. The extended dust distribution originates from the ejection of cold gas by AGN activity 10 Myr ago.

=== Globular clusters ===
NGC 4636 is characterised by its large number of globular clusters, much larger than that of galaxies with similar size located not in the centre of galaxy clusters. The total number of globular clusters within a radius of 14 arcminutes is estimated to be 4,200 ± 120 and within 7 arcminutes is estimated to be 3,500 ± 170. In comparison, 12,000 ± 800 globular clusters orbit around Messier 87, the giant elliptical galaxy at the centre of the Virgo Cluster, and 150–200 lie in and around the Milky Way. The number of globular clusters drops abruptly at 7 and 9 arcminutes, probably indicating the edge of the galaxy.

The color distribution of the globular clusters in the galaxy is bimodal, a distribution that has been observed in other galaxies too. The globular clusters are characterised based on their color as blue or red. The population of red clusters is higher. Similarly with color, the metallicity distribution is bimodal, with two peaks at [Fe/H] = −1.23(σ = 0.32) and −0.35(σ = 0.19). The ages of the globular clusters in NGC 4636 vary from 2 to 15 billion years, with a bit more than a quarter of the clusters having ages less than 5 billion years. It has been suggested that the younger clusters were formed during the merging of smaller galaxies with the elliptical galaxy.

The velocity dispersion of the clusters is 231+15
−17 km/s, with the velocity dispersion of the blue clusters being slightly larger. This velocity dispersion is similar to that of Messier 60, which is, however, a brighter galaxy. Comparing the velocity dispersion of the globular clusters with the stellar one it is calculated that mass-to-light ratio is not constant, but should increase as the galactocentric distance increases, indicating the existence of an extended dark matter halo in NGC 4636.

=== X-ray emission ===
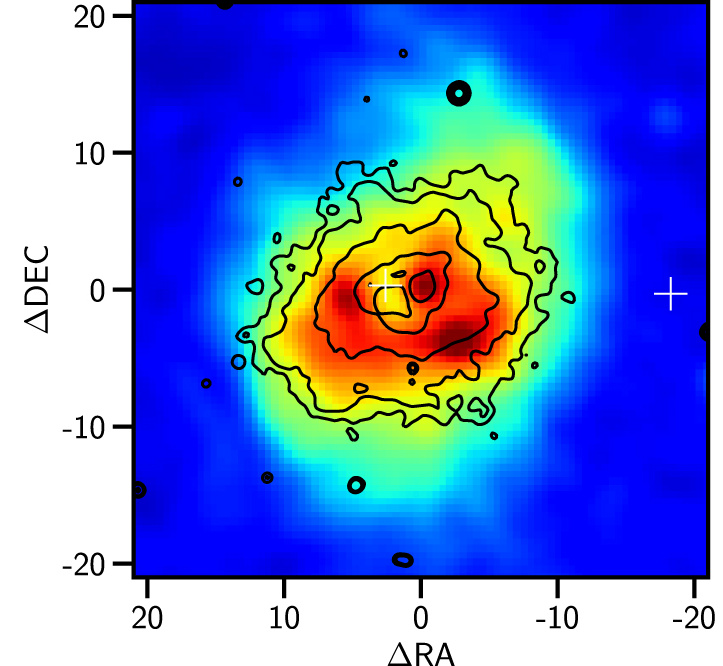
Chandra image of the core of NGC 4636 with superimposed contours of Hα+[N ii] emission. White crosses mark the detected CO cloud positions.

NGC 4636 is one of the most luminous nearby elliptical galaxies when observed in X-rays, with estimated X-ray flux of 1.8×10^{41} erg/s. A hot gas corona around the galaxy was first detected by the Einstein Observatory. Based on the hot interstellar medium temperature profile, the total mass of the halo was estimated to be 1.5×10^{12} M_{☉} within a radius of 35 kpc. The percentage of non-luminous matter mass is estimated to be between 50% and 80% of the total galactic mass, implying an exceptionally low baryon fraction in NGC 4636 and the presence of a large dark matter halo.

The halo of NGC 4636 has some unique features. Observations by the Chandra X-ray Observatory revealed symmetric, 8 kpc long structures within the halo that look like spiral arms. The arms are about 30 percent hotter than the surrounding gas cloud. The arms form the rim of two large ellipsoid bubbles of hot gas. One more bubble-like feature has been detected about 2 kpc south of the northeastern arm. A weak radio source, elongated in the NE–SW direction, connects the NE and SW bubbles. These large bubbles are likely the result of shocks generated by the AGN jets. It is possible that the bubbles have different ages, generated by different AGN outbursts, as indicated by the presence of radio-emitting plasma in one cavity, while the others are radio-quiet.

NGC 4636 has an X-ray-bright core, having a radius of ~1 kpc. The core shows a central cavity surrounded by a bright edge. Interestingly, the small X-ray cavity surrounds the ~1 kpc radio jet detected at 1.4 GHz and is likely generated by the jet. Thus, the X-ray and radio observations point to a scenario in which gas may be currently outflowing in the central kpc of NGC 4636.

There are 318 point X-ray sources in the field of NGC 4636. About 25% of them are identified as background sources. 77 of the sources match the location of globular clusters. No correlation was found between the X-ray luminosities of the matched point sources and the luminosity or color of the host GC candidates. The other point sources are low-mass X-ray binaries.

== Supernovae ==
Two supernovae have been observed in NGC 4636.

- SN 1939A (Type Ia, mag. 12.5) was discovered by Fritz Zwicky on 17 January 1939. Its maximum magnitude was estimated at 11.9.
- SN 2020ue (Type Ia, mag. 15) was discovered by Kōichi Itagaki on 12 January 2020. It reached magnitude 11.8, making it one of the three brightest supernovae of 2020.

== Nearby galaxies ==
NGC 4636 is the foremost galaxy of the galaxy group known as the NGC 4636 group. Other members of the group include NGC 4457, NGC 4586, NGC 4587, NGC 4600, NGC 4665, and NGC 4688. These galaxies, along with NGC 4753, Messier 61 and their groups form the southern boundary of the Virgo Cluster. It can be difficult to determine which galaxies belong to which group especially around the southern edge of the Virgo Cluster where there is a confusion of galaxies at different distances. NGC 4636 has also been listed as a member of the Virgo Cluster.

== See also ==
- NGC 720 – another elliptical galaxy with X-ray halo
