= NGC 779 =

Spiral galaxy in the constellation Cetus

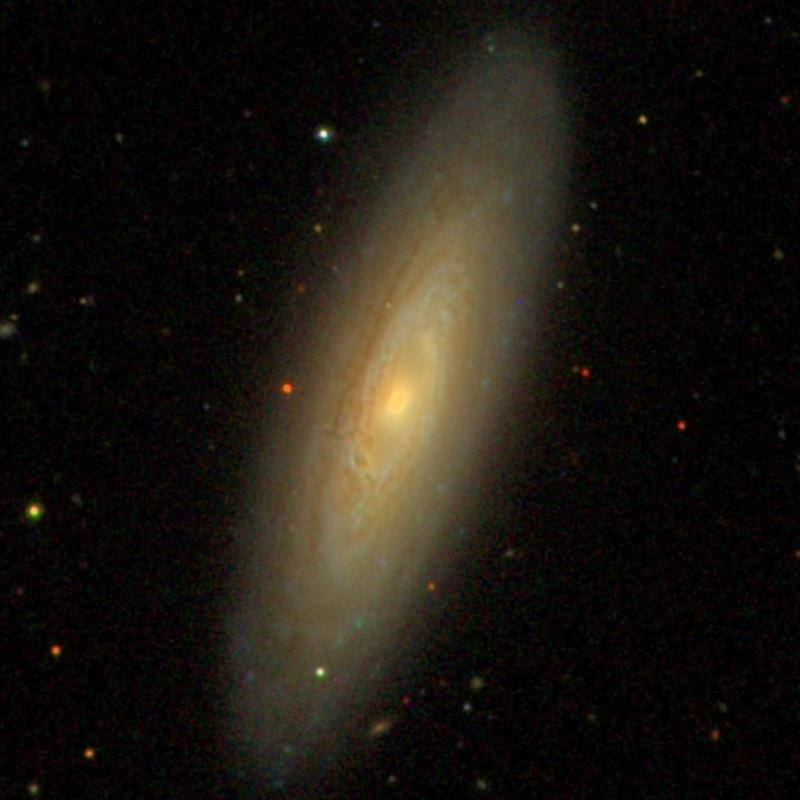
- NGC 779 as seen by SDSS

Observation data (J2000 epoch)
- Constellation: Cetus
- Right ascension: 01^{h} 59^{m} 42.3^{s}
- Declination: −05° 57′ 48″
- Redshift: 0.004640±0.000013
- Heliocentric radial velocity: 1,391±4 km/s
- Distance: 59 ± 11 Mly (18.1 ± 3.4 Mpc)
- Apparent magnitude (V): 11.2

Characteristics
- Type: SAB(r)b
- Apparent size (V): 4.1′ × 1.2′

Other designations
- MCG -01-06-016, PGC 7544

NGC 779 is a spiral galaxy located in the constellation Cetus. It is located at a distance of circa 60 million light years from Earth, which, given its apparent dimensions, means that NGC 779 is about 70,000 light years across. It was discovered by William Herschel on September 10, 1785.

NGC 779 features a bright nucleus and an elliptical or boxy bulge. It is seen with high inclination. The inner arms are tightly wound and form an inner pseudoring with high surface brightness. A break is seen at the northwest side of the pseudoring and may be due to dust extinction. The disk has lower surface brightness and is smooth, with no pronounced star-forming knots. The spiral pattern of the galaxy gas been described either as multiple-armed or grand-design two-armed spiral.

NGC 779 forms a small galaxy group with UGCA 024, known as the NGC 779 group. NGC 779 is considered to be part of the Cetus II cloud, which also includes NGC 584, NGC 681, NGC 720, and their groups, although it could also lie in the foreground.

The galaxy is included in the Herschel 400 Catalogue. It lies about five degrees northeast from Zeta Ceti. It can be seen with a small telescope at moderate magnification, with its core being more easily detected.
