= NGC 720 =

Galaxy in the constellation Cetus

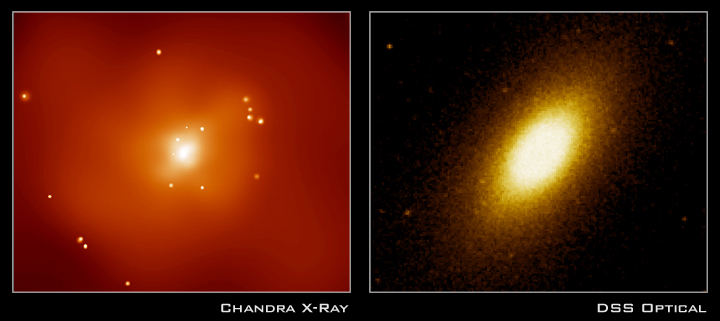
- NGC 720 by Chandra X-ray Observatory (left) and DSS (right)

Observation data (J2000 epoch)
- Constellation: Cetus
- Right ascension: 01^{h} 53^{m} 00.5^{s}
- Declination: −13° 44′ 19″
- Redshift: 0.005821±0.000022
- Heliocentric radial velocity: 1,745±7 km/s
- Distance: 80 ± 20 Mly (24.5 ± 6.1 Mpc)
- Apparent magnitude (V): 10.2

Characteristics
- Type: E5
- Apparent size (V): 4.7′ × 2.4′
- Notable features: Strong X-rays source

Other designations
- MCG -02-05-068, PGC 6983

NGC 720 is an elliptical galaxy located in the constellation Cetus. It is located at a distance of about 80 million light years from Earth, which, given its apparent dimensions, means that NGC 720 is about 110,000 light years across. It was discovered by William Herschel on October 3, 1785. The galaxy is included in the Herschel 400 Catalogue. It lies about three and a half degrees south and slightly east from zeta Ceti.

== Characteristics ==
NGC 720 is an elliptical galaxy with elongated shape in the northwest to southeast axis as seen from Earth. Observations by the Hubble Space Telescope of the core of NGC 720 did not reveal the presence of dust, disk, or inner spiral. As observed in X-rays by the Chandra X-ray Observatory in 2000, the galaxy features a slightly flattened, or ellipsoidal triaxial halo of hot gas that has an orientation different from that of the optical image of the galaxy. The observations by Chandra X-ray Observatory fit predictions of a cold dark matter model. Although the data also fit the expectations from modified Newtonian dynamics (MOND). The galaxy lacks emission in radio waves, meaning it does not host an active galactic nucleus. The total mass of the galaxy with its dark matter halo is estimated to be (3.1±0.4)×10^{12} M_{☉}, with the total gas mass exceeding the stellar one. The observations of hot gas fit models that are nearly hydrostatic. 42 X-ray point sources were detected in the galaxy, including a possible central source. Twelve of them are located within 2 arcsec of globular cluster candidates. NGC 720 features nine ultraluminous X-ray sources, the most found in an early type galaxy as of 2003.

Observations made in 1996 suggested the galaxy had 660 ±190 globular clusters in the central 30kpc, a number considered small for such a galaxy. The allocation of the clusters resembled the ellipticity, position angle and surface brightness of the galaxy. However, in 2012 it was observed that the blue globular clusters subpopulation had a similar slope with the X-ray surface brightness profile. Further observations by the SLUGGS Survey (2016), with wider field data, raised the number of globular clusters in the galaxy to 1489 ± 96 and their distribution was less elliptical than the surface profile of the galaxy. The clusters have bimodal distribution as far as color is concerned, with the clusters characterised as red or blue, with the blue clusters having a stronger connection with the galactic halo.

Optical long slit spectrography of the galaxy showed a strong age gradient along the semimajor axis of NGC 720, which has been explained on the grounds of two distinct population components. At the centre of the galaxy lie stars whose age is estimated to be 13 billion years (Gyrs) old up to 0.73 kpc, where stars with solar metallicity age (5 Gyrs) dominate. These older stars form a small bulge-like spheroid. At distances over 1 kpc dominate stars with age at 2,5 Gyrs. Based on the Mg2 gradient and its mass, it is proposed that NGC 720 underwent an unequal mass galaxy merger about 4 Gyrs ago.

== Nearby galaxies ==
NGC 720 is the foremost galaxy in a small galaxy group, the NGC 720 group or LGG 38 which also includes the galaxy Arp 4. NGC 720 lies at the centre of the group and the rest of the galaxies of the group are dwarf galaxies, which are at least 2 mag fainter than NGC 720. There is extended intragroup X-ray emission. The high fraction of early-type galaxies suggest that NGC 720 may be a fossil group, despite its low mass. Further away lie the edge-on spiral galaxies NGC 681, NGC 701, and NGC 755.

== Gallery ==
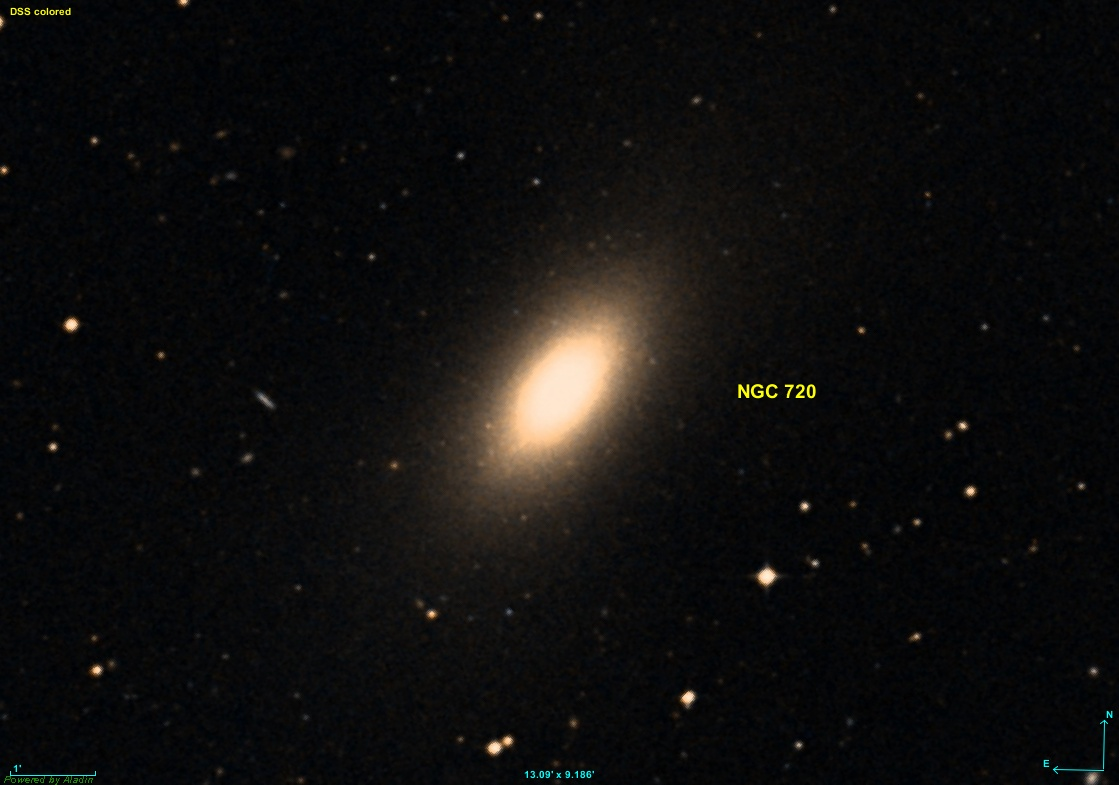
DSS image of NGC 720

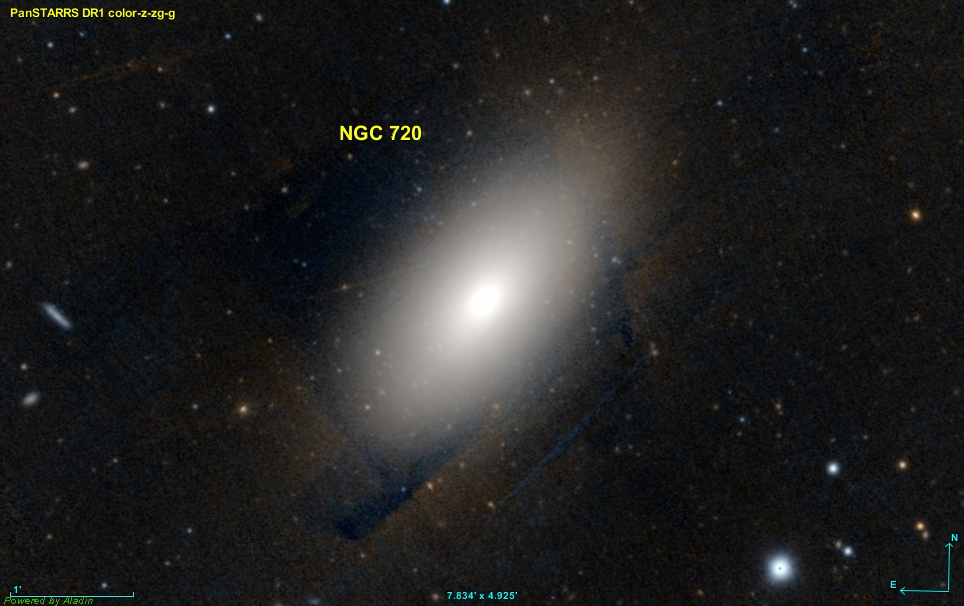
Pan-STARRS image of NGC 720
