= NGC 5846 =

Galaxy in the constellation Virgo

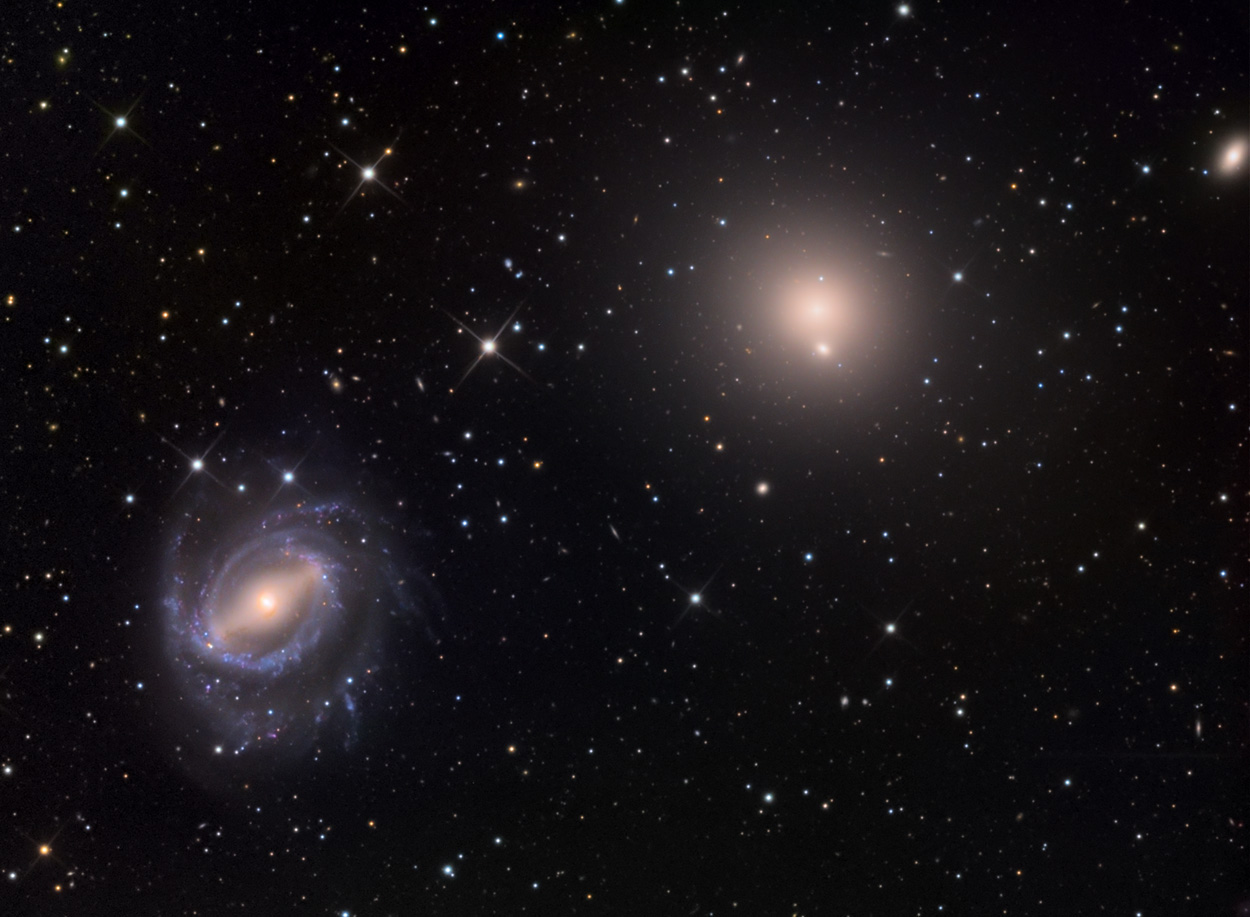
- NGC 5846 (right) and NGC 5850 (left) by the Schulman Telescope at Mount Lemmon SkyCenter

Observation data (J2000 epoch)
- Constellation: Virgo
- Right ascension: 15^{h} 06^{m} 29.3^{s}
- Declination: +01° 36′ 20″
- Redshift: 0.005711 ± 0.000017
- Heliocentric radial velocity: 1,712 ± 5 km/s
- Distance: 93 ± 32 Mly (28.5 ± 9.8 Mpc)
- Apparent magnitude (V): 10.1

Characteristics
- Type: E0-1
- Apparent size (V): 4′.1 × 3′.8
- Notable features: Strong X-ray source

Other designations
- UGC 9706, CGCG 020-061, MCG +00-38-025, PGC 53932

NGC 5846 is an elliptical galaxy located in the constellation Virgo. It is located at a distance of circa 90 million light years from Earth, which, given its apparent dimensions, means that NGC 5846 is about 110,000 light years across. It was discovered by William Herschel on February 24, 1786. It lies near 110 Virginis and is part of the Herschel 400 Catalogue. It is a member of the NGC 5846 Group of galaxies, itself one of the Virgo III Groups strung out to the east of the Virgo Supercluster of galaxies.

== Characteristics ==
NGC 5846 is a giant elliptical galaxy with a round shape. It has a low luminosity active galactic nucleus, whose categorisation is ambiguous, having features that are observed both in LINER and HII regions. The source of nuclear activity in galaxies is suggested to be a supermassive black hole that accretes material. NGC 5846 harbors a supermassive black hole with estimated mass (1.1±0.1)×10^{9} M_{☉} based on the central velocity dispersion.

NGC 5846 harbors a large number of globular clusters; over 1,200 have been detected in images by Hubble Space Telescope. The specific frequency is similar to other elliptical galaxies in groups. As has been observed in other large elliptical galaxies, the metallicity has bimodial distribution, with metallicities roughly of [Fe/H]=-1.2 and -0.2. Their typical effective radii are in the range of 3 - 5 pc, with the largest clusters located in the central regions. Seven of the globular clusters have X-ray counterparts, which are among the most luminous X-ray sources in NGC 5846. These clusters are mostly in the central region and they are optically luminous, compact and belong to the red subpopulation.

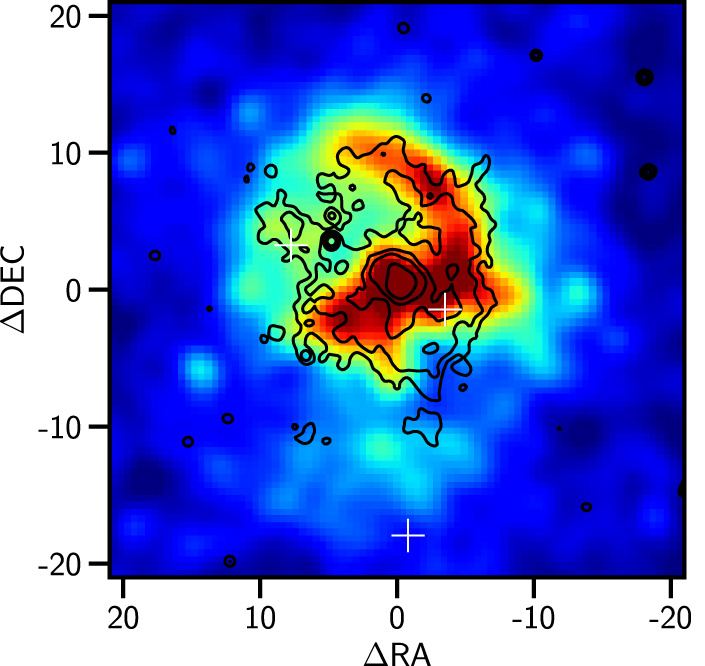
Chandra image of NGC 5846 with superimposed contours of Hα+[N ii] emission. White crosses mark the detected CO cloud positions.

The galaxy has complex X-ray morphology that is considered to be the result of AGN outflows. Two inner bubbles in the hot gas, at a distance of 600 pc from the center and filled with radio emission, are clear indications of recent AGN feedback. A weak radio source, elongated in the NE–SW direction, connects the inner cavities. X-ray-bright rims surround the inner X-ray bubbles. Many X-ray knots are visible, suggesting cooling sites. The scenario indicated by the Chandra observation is that of an AGN outflow, compressing and cooling the gas in the central ~2 kpc (20" at the distance of NGC 5846).

Hα observations reveal the presence of warm ionized gas in the inner 2 kpc of NGC 5846. Spectra of this gas indicate irregular motion, with a typical velocity of 150–200 km s−1. The warm gas traces the X-ray-bright features, again suggesting a multiphase AGN outflow. Using the Spitzer IRS mid-infrared lines were detected (e.g., [Ne ii] 12.81 μm, [Ne iii] 15.55 μm) but no trace of polycyclic aromatic hydrocarbon (PAH) emission. Several sources are identified in the radio at 2.3, 5, and 15 GHz using VLBA data; these sources are aligned in the south–north direction.

Recent Herschel PACS observations have detected the presence of [C ii]-emitting gas that extends to a radius of ~2 kpc and is centrally peaked. The [C ii] emission is almost exactly cospatial with the H-alpha +[N II] emission, and the total fluxes in [C ii] and H-alpha +[N II] have a ratio of 2.5, a very similar flux ratio value observed in other group-centered ellipticals. Furthermore, the velocities inferred from the [C ii] line are consistent with those measured for the Hα line. All of this evidence suggests that the [C ii] line is emitted by the warm gas, and it is not necessarily tracing the molecular phase.

NGC 5846 has another indication that the cold gas is being disturbed by an AGN outburst. It has, in fact, an excess of cold (T ~ 30 K) dust approximately cospatial with the ionized and molecular gas. With a 70 μm luminosity of 3.5 × 10^{41} erg s−1, NGC 5846 shares the same dust properties as several giant ellipticals (e.g., NGC 4636 and NGC 5044), which are best explained with the ejection of dusty gas from their centers by AGN activity that occurred ~10^{7} yr ago.

Three CO clouds have been detected in NGC 5846. Clouds 1 and 3 are resolved in at least one direction by ALMA 12 m array observations and extend to 1"2 and 2"9, respectively, and are about 5"5 and 8"4 away (0.6 and 1.0 kpc) from the galaxy center, respectively. Cloud 3 is aligned almost exactly along a dust filament, while cloud 1 also coincides with small dust extinction structures. The elongation and potential bimodality of the surface brightness of cloud 3 of NGC 5846 could indicate that it might be composed of two nearby (in projection) clouds. Cloud 2 lies further away from the centre and is thought to originate from cooling in the wakes beneath buoyant X-ray cavities where compressions stimulate significant large-scale, coherent radiative cooling.

== Nearby galaxies ==
NGC 5846 forms a non-interacting pair with NGC 5846A, which lies 0.7 arcminutes from NGC 5846. Its proximity to NGC 5846 and high surface brightness suggests it has been tidally stripped. The barred spiral galaxy NGC 5850 lies at a projected distance of 10 arcminutes from NGC 5846 and may form an interacting pair with NGC 5846 based on its disturbed morphology. It is suggested that the two galaxies had a high speed encounter approximately 200 million years ago.

NGC 5846 has a companion named NGC 5846-UDG1, an example of an ultra diffuse galaxy. Ultra-diffuse galaxies have higher proportions of globular clusters than other galaxies, but NGC 5846 is one of the most extreme, with about 13% of its luminosity coming from globular clusters.

NGC 5846 is the foremost galaxy of the large galaxy group known as the NGC 5846 group. Other members of the group include NGC 5813, NGC 5831, NGC 5845, and NGC 5854. The group has two subgroups, one centered around the elliptical NGC 5813 and the other around NGC 5846, lying at a projected separation of 600 kpc. The group is part of the Virgo III Groups, a very obvious chain of galaxy groups on the left side of the Virgo cluster, stretching across 40 million light years of space.
