= CDF-S XT1 =

X-ray transient from an unknown source

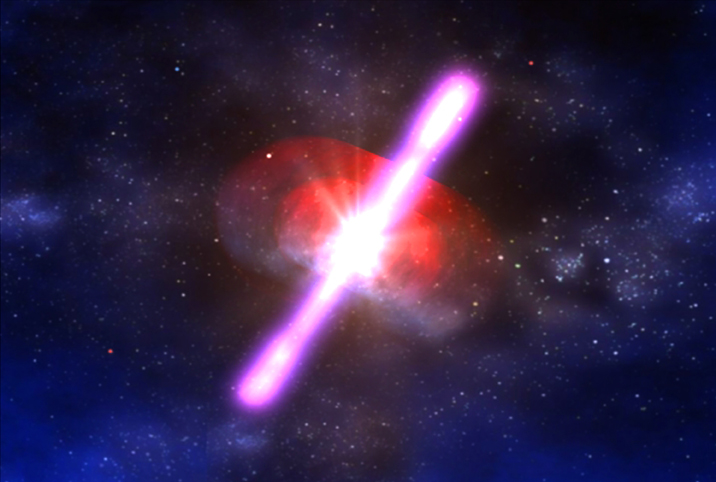
- Illustration of a gamma-ray burst (GRB) as a result of the merging of two neutron stars
- Event type: X-ray transient
- Date: 1 October 2014
- Instrument: Chandra X-ray telescope
- Redshift: z=2.23
- Progenitor: Unknown

CDF-S XT1 was an X-ray transient that was detected by Chandra with the Deep-Field South Survey (CDF-S). The origin of this event remains unknown, however there have been several hypotheses suggested, ranging from the collapse of a massive star, the merging of two neutron stars or even the merging of a neutron star and a black hole. The event occurred at a distance of redshift z=2.23 inside a small galaxy.

The energy released by CDF-S XT1 was sudden and grew brighter by at least a factor of 1,000 in just a few hours. In about a day, the source had faded below the sensitivity level of Chandra. In the end, CDF-S XT1 had released more energy than all the stars in its host galaxy by a thousand times. Although this event was unique, there have been other similar events that had occurred in the galaxies NGC 5128 and NGC 4636, both of which are elliptical galaxies. Theses event occurred with the complete destruction of either neutron stars or white dwarfs.

== Observation ==
CDF-S XT1 was first observed by the Chandra telescope on October 1, 2014 in the Deep-Field South Survey (CDF-S). The first photon arrived 1.68x10^4 seconds into the observation period with the following ~100 seconds swing displaying a sharp increase in the count of photons. Then over the next 10^5 seconds, the number of photons would decrease. However there is some debate over whether the first photon to arrive was from CDF-S XT1, with some arguing that it is consistent with the background rate.

== Origins ==
The origin of CDF-S XT1 remains unclear despite numerous hypotheses being put forth about its origins, and most scientist’s agree that it involved a destructive event and the occurrence of a gamma-ray burst (GRB) with an off-set axis. Many ideas involve the merger of two objects, such as a neutron star merging with another neutron star or a neutron star merging with a black hole. Another idea is the collapse of a massive star or a white dwarf star being shredded by a medium sized black hole.

=== Neutron star merger ===
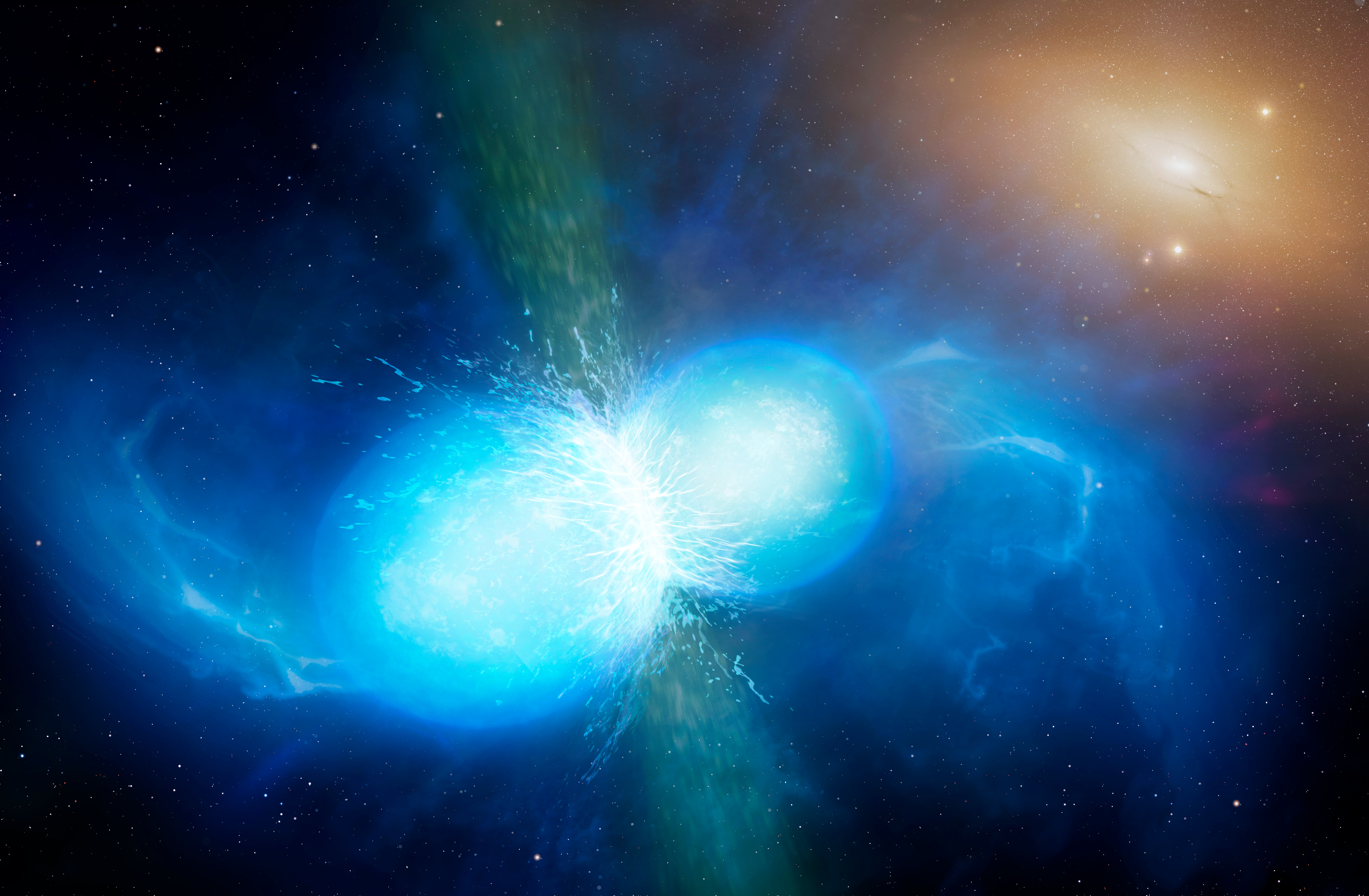
Artistic impression of a neutron star merger

In this scenario, a binary system of two neutron stars merged producing a gamma-ray burst that was off-set. If this scenario is true, this would be potentially one of the most distant observed neutron star merger event. This would have implications for the star formation and nucleosynthesis of heavy elements in the early universe. The potential existence of neutron star mergers this early in the universe history implies that stellar evolution has been occurring before the peak of star formation in the universe. This also implies that the synthesis of heavy elements has been occurring in the early universe.

=== Core collapse ===
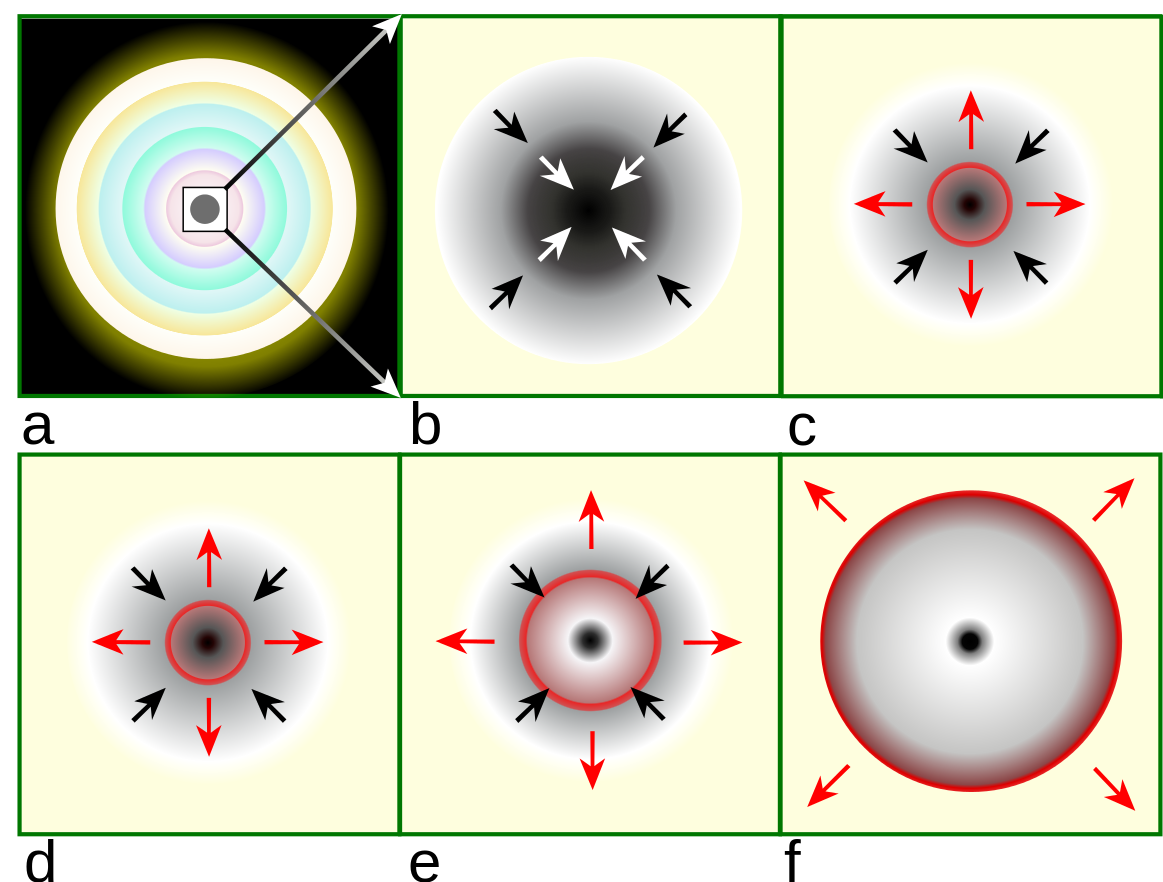
Diagram showing the mechanism of core collapse

In this scenario, a massive star had its core collapse resulting in an event called a core-collapse supernova. While the time scales observed from CDF-S XT1 is consistent with a supernova, the observed spectra is not. They are thermal transients and the radiation they produce is typically soft X-ray or ultra-violet depending on the temperature of the system.
