= NGC 2857 =

Spiral galaxy in the constellation Ursa Major

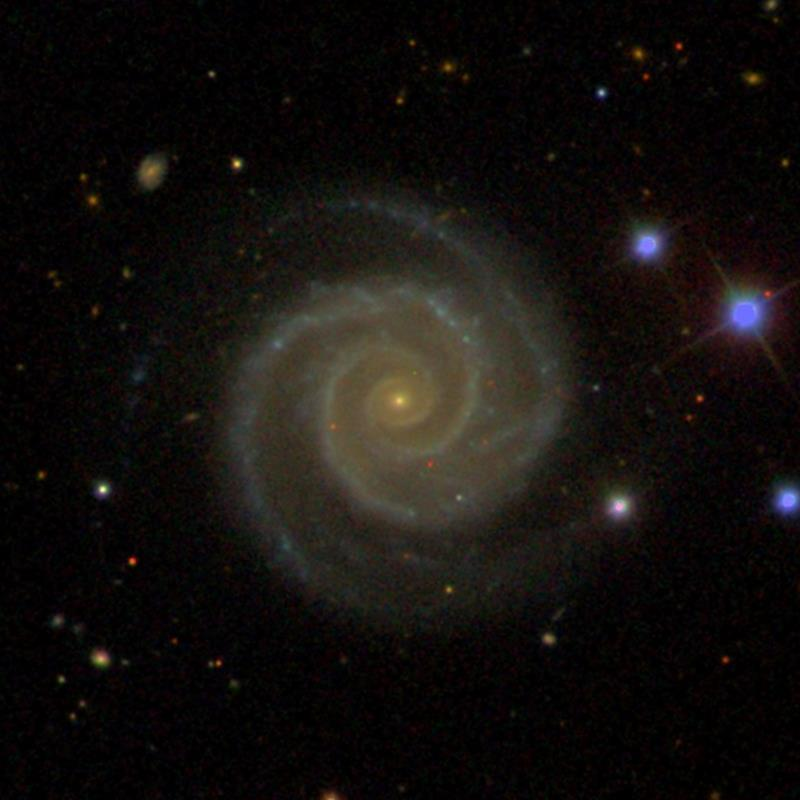
- SDSS image of NGC 2857

Observation data (J2000 epoch)
- Constellation: Ursa Major
- Right ascension: 09^{h} 24^{m} 37.698^{s}
- Declination: +49° 21′ 25.69″
- Redshift: 0.016301 ± 0.000023
- Heliocentric radial velocity: 4887 ± 7 km/s
- Galactocentric velocity: 4917 ± 7 km/s
- Distance: 69.050 ± 00 Mpc (225.21 ± 0.00 Mly)h^{−1}_{0.73}
- Apparent magnitude (V): 12.27
- Apparent magnitude (B): 12.90
- Absolute magnitude (V): -21.92 ± 0.22

Characteristics
- Type: SA(s)c
- Size: 125,000
- Apparent size (V): 1.70′ × 1.43′

Other designations
- NGC 2857, Arp 1, APG 1, PGC 26666, UGC 5000

NGC 2857 (also known as Arp 1 and PGC 26666) is a spiral galaxy in the constellation Ursa Major. It was discovered on January 9, 1856, by R. J. Mitchell.

NGC 2857 is the first object in Halton Arp's Atlas of Peculiar Galaxies, and one of six Arp objects in the 'Low Surface Brightness Galaxies' section. The other five low surface brightness galaxies are Arp 2 (UGC 10310), Arp 3, Arp 4, Arp 5 (NGC 3664), and Arp 6 (NGC 2537).

== Supernova ==
One supernova has been observed in NGC 2857:

- SN 2012fg (Type II-P, mag. 14.5) was discovered by the MASTER-Kislovodsk auto-detection system on October 7, 2012. Its absolute magnitude was calculated to be -19.8. The spectrum of SN 2012fg was recorded and analyzed by multiple teams of scientists as it changed rapidly in the days following its detection.
