= Chandra Deep Field South =

Astronomical survey in Fornax

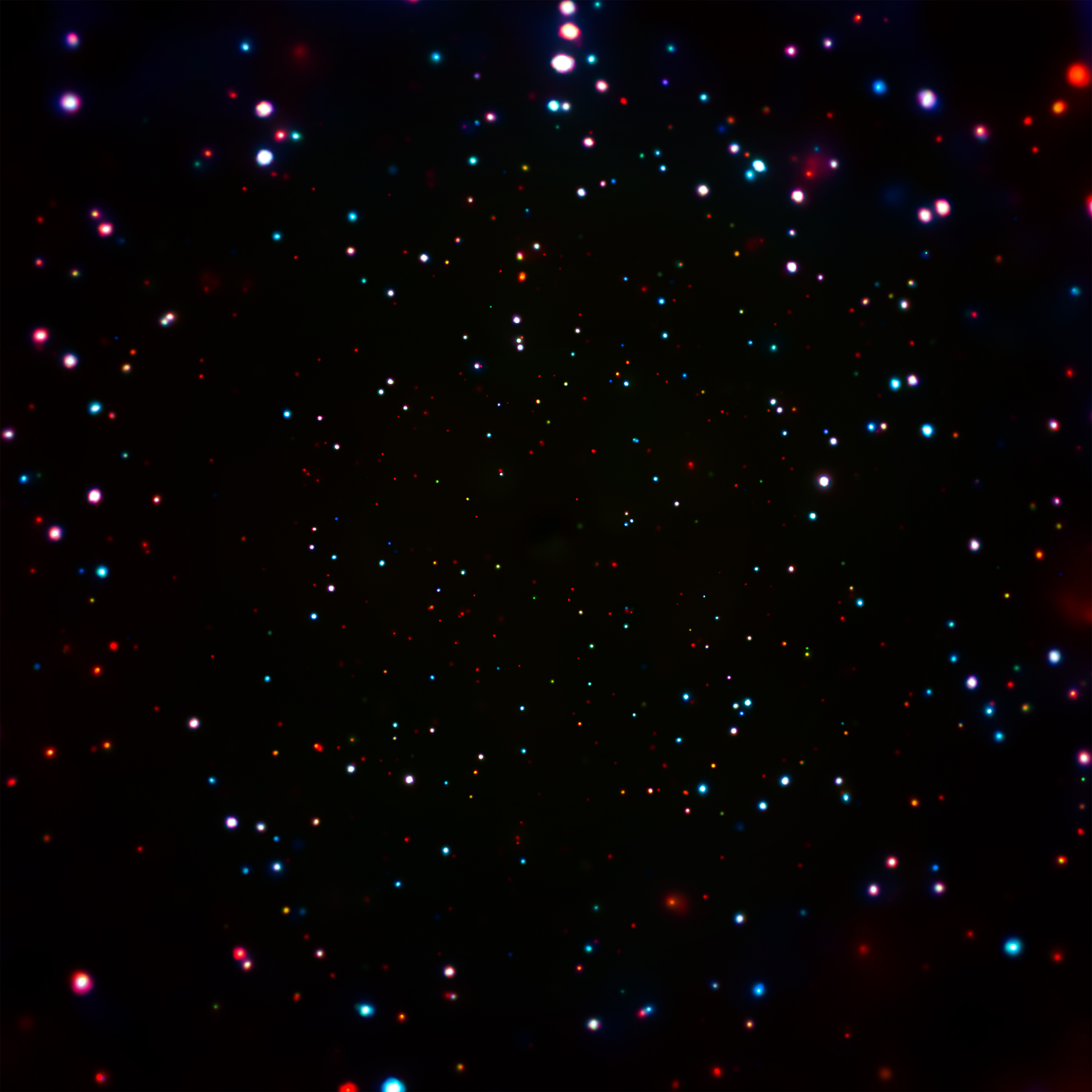
- The deepest X-ray image ever obtained, made with over 7 million seconds of observing time with NASA's Chandra X-ray Observatory.
- Alternative names: CDF-S
- Related media on Commons

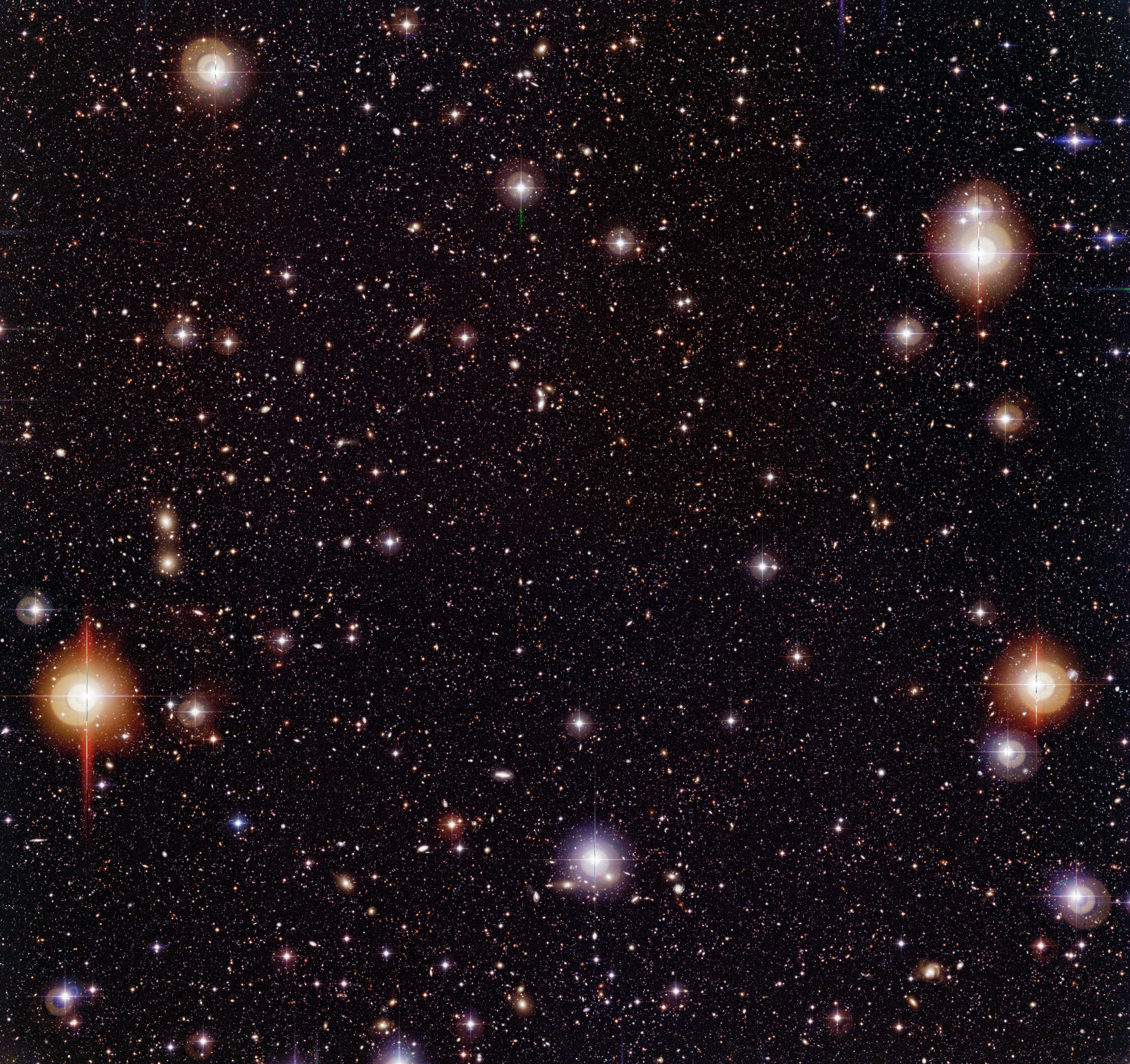
Three-colour composite image of the Chandra Deep Field South (CDF-S), obtained with the Wide Field Imager on the 2.2-m MPG/ESO telescope at the ESO La Silla Observatory (Chile). This region spans 10.1 x 10.5 arcminutes (2545 x 2635 pixels). It is composed of approximately 150 images each in the B band (centered at 456 nm, represented in blue, total exposure time 15.8 hours), V band (540 nm, green, 15.6 hours), and R band (652 nm, red, 17.8 hours) wavelength ranges.

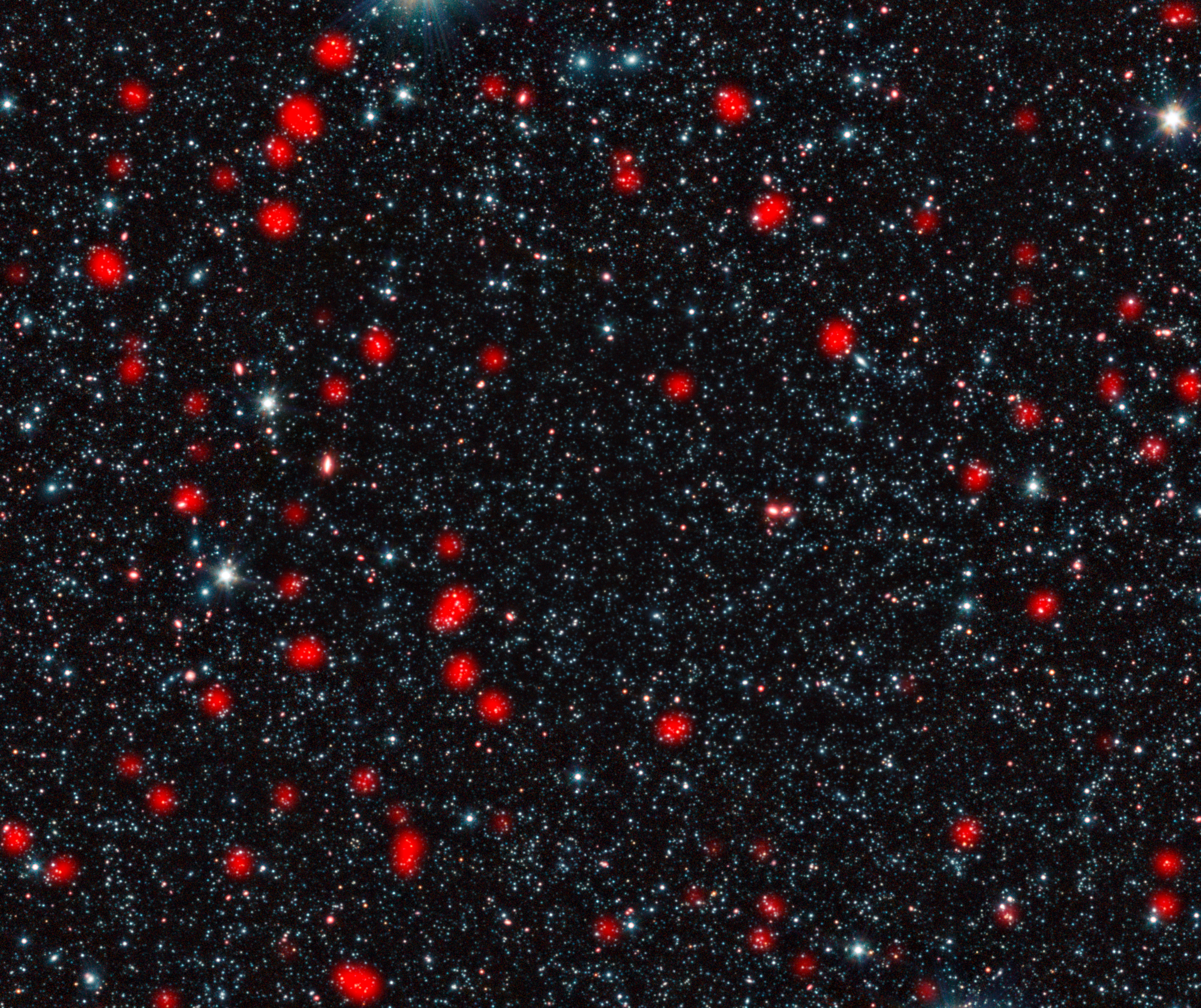
Composite image of the Extended Chandra Deep Field South

The Chandra Deep Field South (CDF-S) is a deep-sky survey field observed by the Chandra X-ray Observatory satellite. It contains only stars fainter than magnitude 14 lying in the constellation Fornax. The image is centered on RA 3^{h} 32^{m}28.0^{s}, DEC −27° 48′ 30″, covering 0.11 square degrees and measuring 16 arcminutes across.

The image was created by compositing 11 individual ACIS-I exposures for a cumulative exposure time of over one million seconds between 1999 and 2000, led by Riccardo Giacconi. Further observations taken until 2010 have resulted in a total of exposure of over four million seconds. The CDF-S is the single target where Chandra has observed the longest.

This region was selected for observation because it has much less galactic dust than most other areas of the sky, reducing the risk of obscuration of distant sources.

The field was extended to form the Extended Chandra Deep Field South (ECDF-S). The CDF-S has produced major discoveries in high-energy astronomy and served as a key field for multi-wavelength surveys such as GOODS.

The fields themselves are considered "deep fields" because, similar to the Hubble Deep Field, they are able to see the most distant objects compared to other X-ray images of the Universe. But while the exposure time was similar to Hubble's, the CDF-S and ECDF-S both have a larger field of view.

== Extended Chandra Deep Field South ==
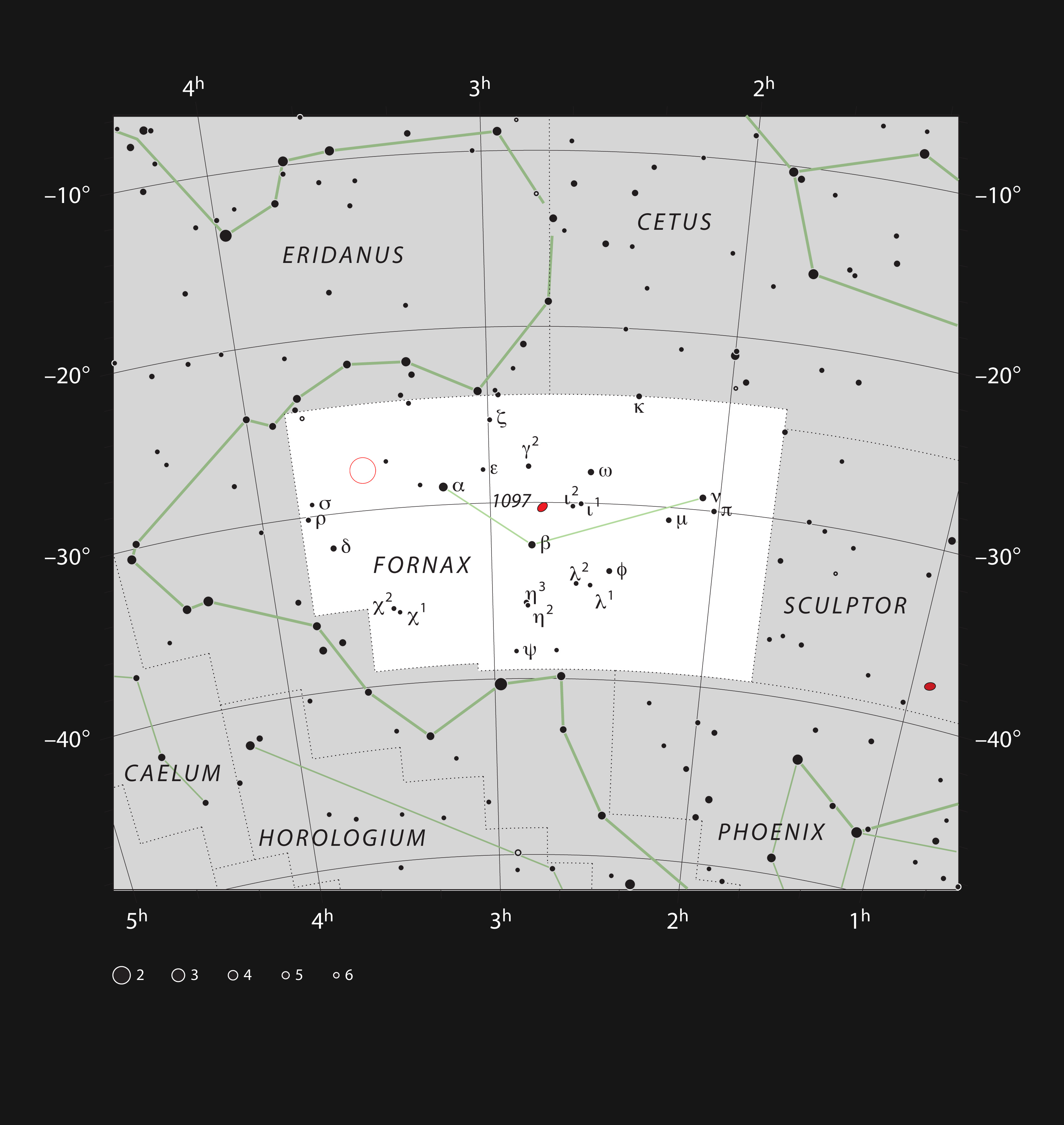
The position of the Extended Chandra Deep Field South in the constellation of Fornax

The Extended Chandra Deep Field South consists of four contiguous observations, each of about 250 thousand seconds, using Chandra's ACIS‑I instrument. The ACIS is a series of charge-coupled devices (CCDs) that flanked the original CDF-S field. Together, these instruments cover approximately 0.3 square degrees and were completed in 2005 to provide a wider, shallower complement to the ultra-deep central pointing that is characteristic of CDF-S. This extension enabled improved sampling of large-scale structures and environment studies of X-ray sources. It also helped generate enhanced point-source and extended-source catalogs.

There was substantial follow-up across optical, infrared, radio, and sub-millimeter bands, including spectroscopy with VLT and Keck, VLA imaging, the LABOCA survey and Euclid. In late 2024, the ECDF-S was chosen as one of the key fields for Data Preview 1 (DP1), the first science-grade data release from the LSST Commissioning Camera at Vera C. Rubin Observatory in Chile. DP1 was released June 30, 2025, and the ECDF-S was observed for 21 epochs.

== Science outcomes ==
Multispectral observations of the region were carried out in collaboration with the Very Large Telescope and Paranal Observatory. Through the course of these investigations, the X-ray background was determined to have originated from the central supermassive black holes of distant galaxies, and a better characterization of Type II quasars was obtained. (Type II quasars appear, from our plane of view, to be deeply embedded in dust and gas.)

The CDF-S discovered over 300 X-ray sources, many of them from "low-luminosity" AGN lying about 9 billion light years away. The study also discovered the then-most distant Type II quasar, lying at redshift z = 3.7, some 12 billion light years away.

As of 2001, the Chandra X-ray images were considered the deepest ever recorded.

In 2014 and 2015, astronomers detected four very intense burst of X-rays, still currently unexplained, from a small galaxy known as CDF-S XT1, located approximately 11 billion light years from Earth.

In 2017, a mysterious X-ray flare was discovered in X-ray images of CDF-S taken by the Chandra X-ray Observatory. The cause of this flare has not yet been clearly determined. It represented a phenomenon that could not be explained by existing variable celestial objects.

== GOODS Survey ==
As part of the Great Observatories Origins Deep Survey (beginning in 2002), deep observations were conducted of a 320 square arcminute region centered on CDF-S. This project involved NASA's large space telescopes—Spitzer, Hubble, and Chandra—as well as ESA's Herschel and XMM-Newton and ground-based observatories.

== See also ==
- Hubble Deep Field South
- List of deep fields
