= NGC 5854 =

Galaxy in the constellation Virgo

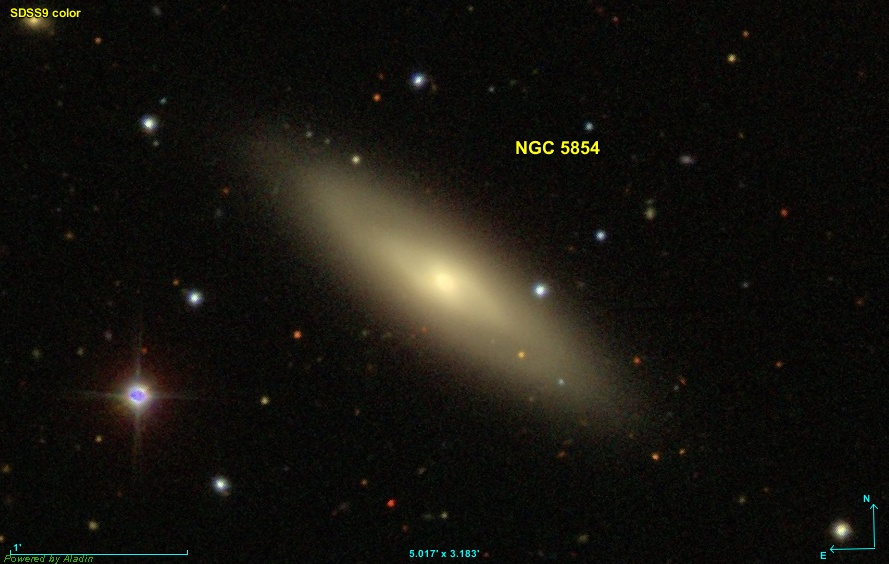
- NGC 5854 imaged by SDSS

Observation data (J2000 epoch)
- Constellation: Virgo
- Right ascension: 15^{h} 07^{m} 47.7018^{s}
- Declination: +02° 34′ 07.064″
- Redshift: 0.005547±0.0000170
- Heliocentric radial velocity: 1,663±5 km/s
- Distance: 60.95 ± 6.94 Mly (18.686 ± 2.128 Mpc)
- Group or cluster: NGC 5846 group (LGG 393)
- Apparent magnitude (V): 12.7g

Characteristics
- Type: SB0^{+}(s) edge-on
- Size: ~58,000 ly (17.78 kpc) (estimated)
- Apparent size (V): 2.95′ × 0.74′

Other designations
- 2MASX J15074772+0234068, UGC 9726, MCG +01-39-001, PGC 54013, CGCG 049-009

NGC 5854 is a lenticular galaxy in the constellation of Virgo. Its velocity with respect to the cosmic microwave background is 1,851±14 km/s, which corresponds to a Hubble distance of 89.0 ± 6.3 Mly (27.30 ± 1.92 Mpc). However, seven non-redshift measurements give a much closer mean distance of 60.95 ± 6.94 Mly (18.686 ± 2.128 Mpc). It was discovered by German-British astronomer William Herschel on 24 February 1786.

== NGC 5846 group ==
According to A. M. Garcia, NGC 5854 is part of the NGC 5846 group (also known as LGG 393). This galaxy group has nine members, including NGC 5813, NGC 5831, NGC 5846, NGC 5864, NGC 5869, UGC 9746, UGC 9760, and UGC 9751. This group is part of the Virgo III Cloud.

== Supernova ==
One supernova has been observed in NGC 5854:

- SN 1980P (type unknown, mag. 15) was discovered by S. Faber on 20 March 1980. Although never officially classified, the discovery report claimed the supernova appeared to be of Type I, about 20 days after maximum.

== See also ==
- List of NGC objects (5001–6000)
