= NGC 4516 =

Galaxy in the constellation Coma Berenices

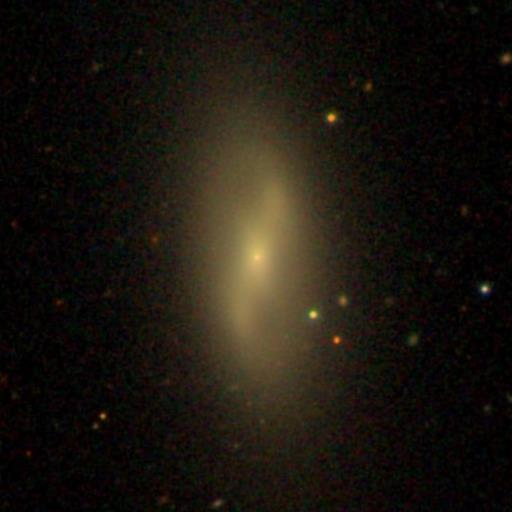
- SDSS image of NGC 4516.

Observation data (J2000 epoch)
- Constellation: Coma Berenices
- Right ascension: 12^{h} 33^{m} 07.5349^{s}
- Declination: +14° 34′ 29.892″
- Redshift: 0.003143
- Distance: 60.9 ± 4.4 Mly (18.66 ± 1.35 Mpc)
- Group or cluster: Virgo Cluster
- Apparent magnitude (V): 13.6

Characteristics
- Type: SB(rs)ab?
- Size: ~31,600 ly (9.69 kpc) (estimated)
- Apparent size (V): 1.9′ × 0.77′

Other designations
- VCC 1479, UGC 7703, MCG +03-32-067, PGC 41661, CGCG 099-087

NGC 4516 is a barred spiral galaxy located about 55 million light-years away in the constellation Coma Berenices. NGC 4516 was discovered by astronomer William Herschel on April 8, 1784. NGC 4516 is a member of the Virgo Cluster.

== See also ==
- List of NGC objects (4001–5000)
- NGC 4440
