= Arp 4 =

Galaxy in the constellation Cetus

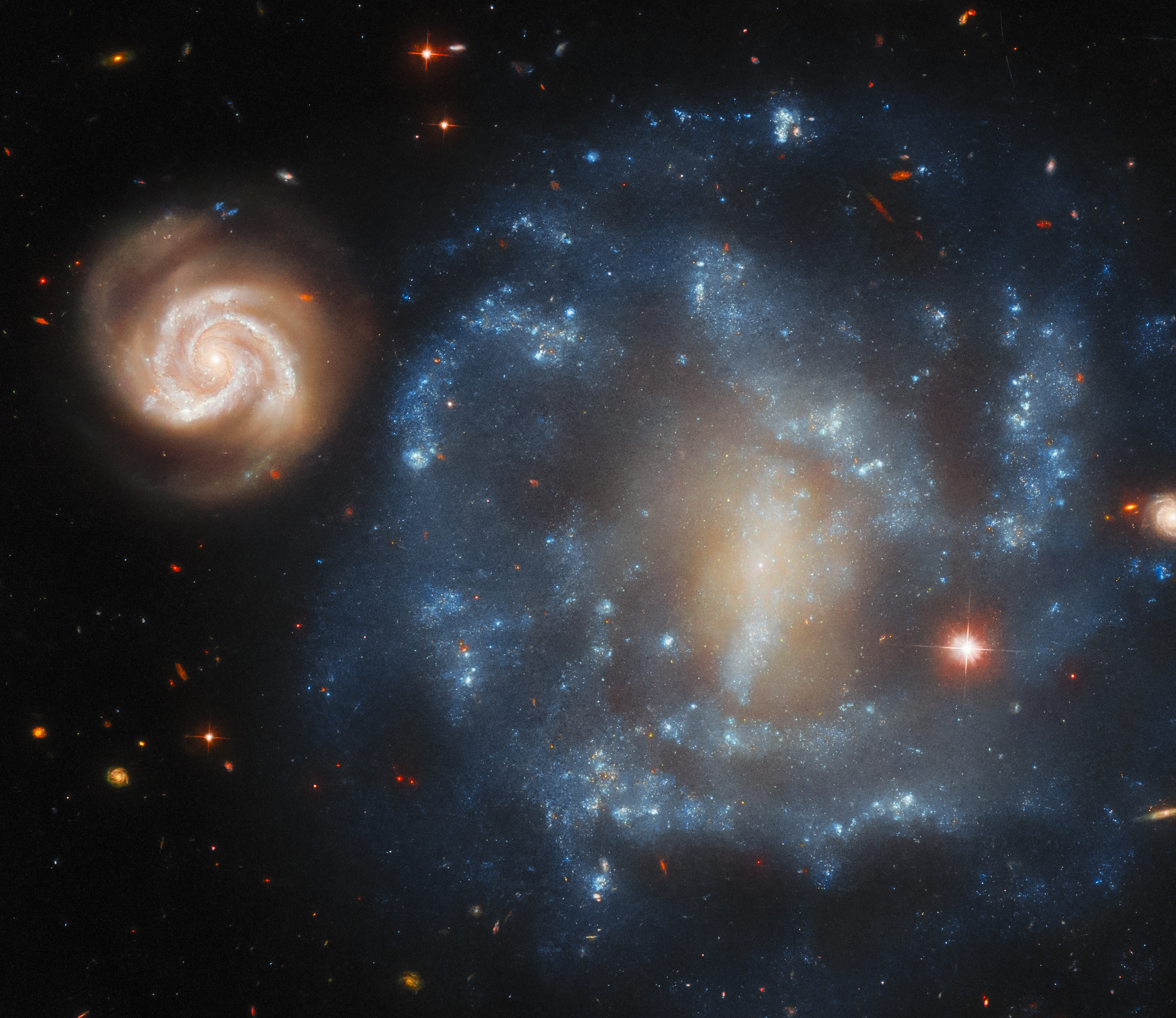
- Arp 4 (right) with PGC 6629 (left) imaged by the Hubble Space Telescope and the Víctor M. Blanco Telescope

Observation data (J2000 epoch)
- Constellation: Cetus
- Right ascension: 01^{h} 48^{m} 25.7565^{s}
- Declination: −12° 22′ 52.392″
- Redshift: 0.005384±0.0000100
- Heliocentric radial velocity: 1,614±3 km/s
- Distance: 64.7 ± 4.6 Mly (19.83 ± 1.42 Mpc)
- Group or cluster: NGC 720 Group (LGG 38)
- Apparent magnitude (V): 13.71

Characteristics
- Type: IAB(rs)m
- Size: ~52,900 ly (16.23 kpc) (estimated)
- Apparent size (V): 2.8′ × 2.3′

Other designations
- DDO 14, Arp 4, MCG -02-05-050, PGC 6626

Arp 4 is an irregular galaxy in the constellation of Cetus. Its velocity with respect to the cosmic microwave background is 1,345±19 km/s, which corresponds to a Hubble distance of 64.7 ± 4.6 Mly (19.83 ± 1.42 Mpc). Additionally, one non-redshift measurement gives a similar distance estimate of 65 Mly (19.8 Mpc). It was discovered in 1959 by Dutch-Canadian astronomer Sidney van den Bergh, who listed it in the David Dunlap Observatory Catalogue as dwarf galaxy DDO 14.

Arp 4 is the fourth object in Halton Arp's Atlas of Peculiar Galaxies, and one of six Arp objects in the 'Low Surface Brightness Galaxies' section. The other five low surface brightness galaxies are Arp 1 (NGC 2857), Arp 2 (UGC 10310), Arp 3, Arp 5 (NGC 3664), and Arp 6 (NGC 2537).

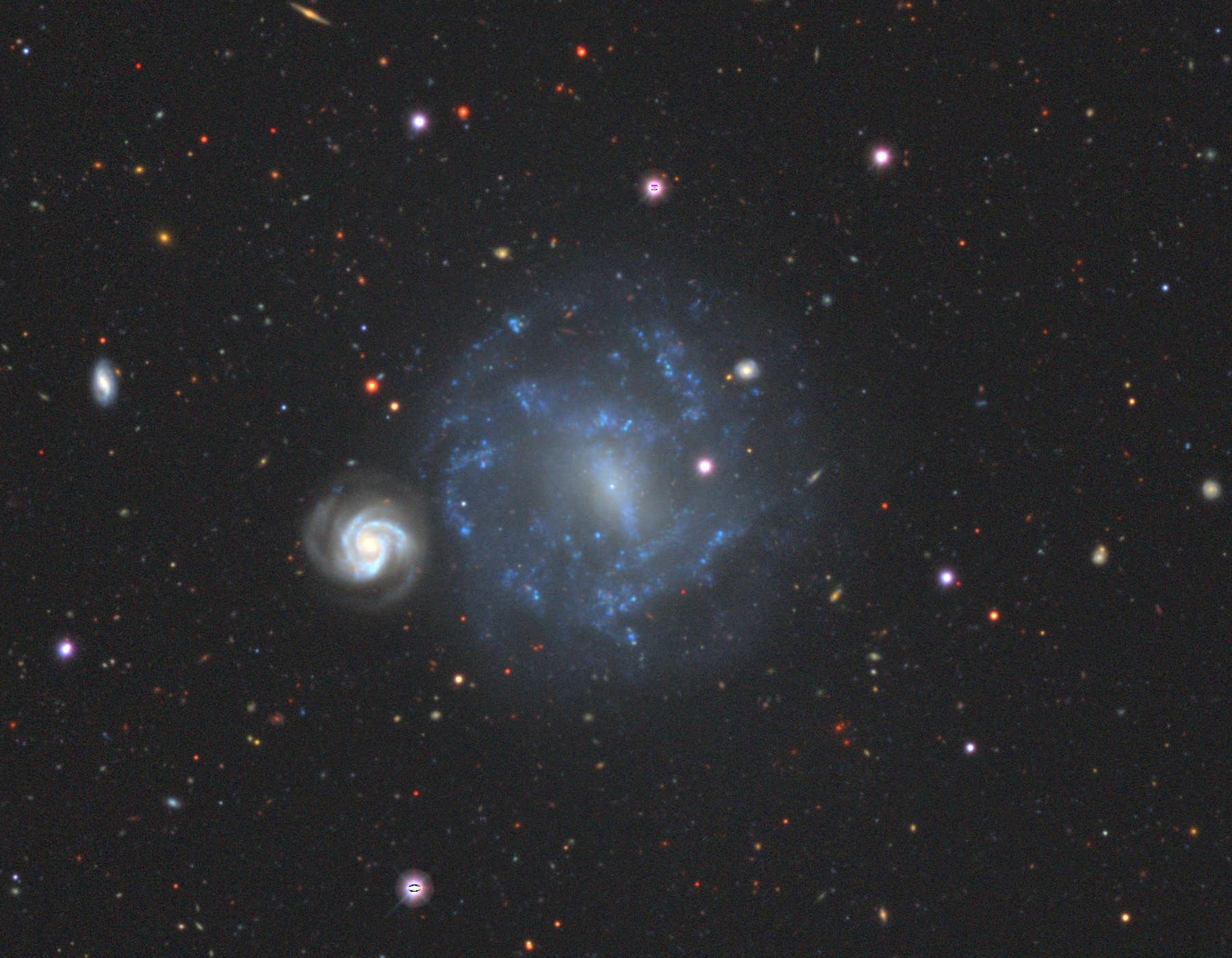
Arp 4 with PGC 6629 imaged by Legacy Surveys

Arp 4 has a possible active galactic nucleus, i.e. it has a compact region at the center of a galaxy that emits a significant amount of energy across the electromagnetic spectrum, with characteristics indicating that this luminosity is not produced by the stars.

Arp 4 and the galaxy PGC 6629 are visually very close to each other, but the alignment is purely optical, as the Hubble distance to PGC 6629 is 675.0 ± 47.3 Mly (206.96 ± 14.50 Mpc), which is about 10 times further away than Arp 4.

== NGC 720 group ==
Arp 4 is a member of the NGC 720 galaxy group (also known as LGG 38). The other galaxies in the group are NGC 720, MCG -02-05-056, MCG -02-05-072, MCG -02-05-074, DDO 15, KUG 0150-138, KUG 0151-140, PGC 87900, PGC 87906, and UGCA 22.

== See also ==
- Atlas of Peculiar Galaxies
