= NGC 5850 =

Galaxy in the constellation Virgo

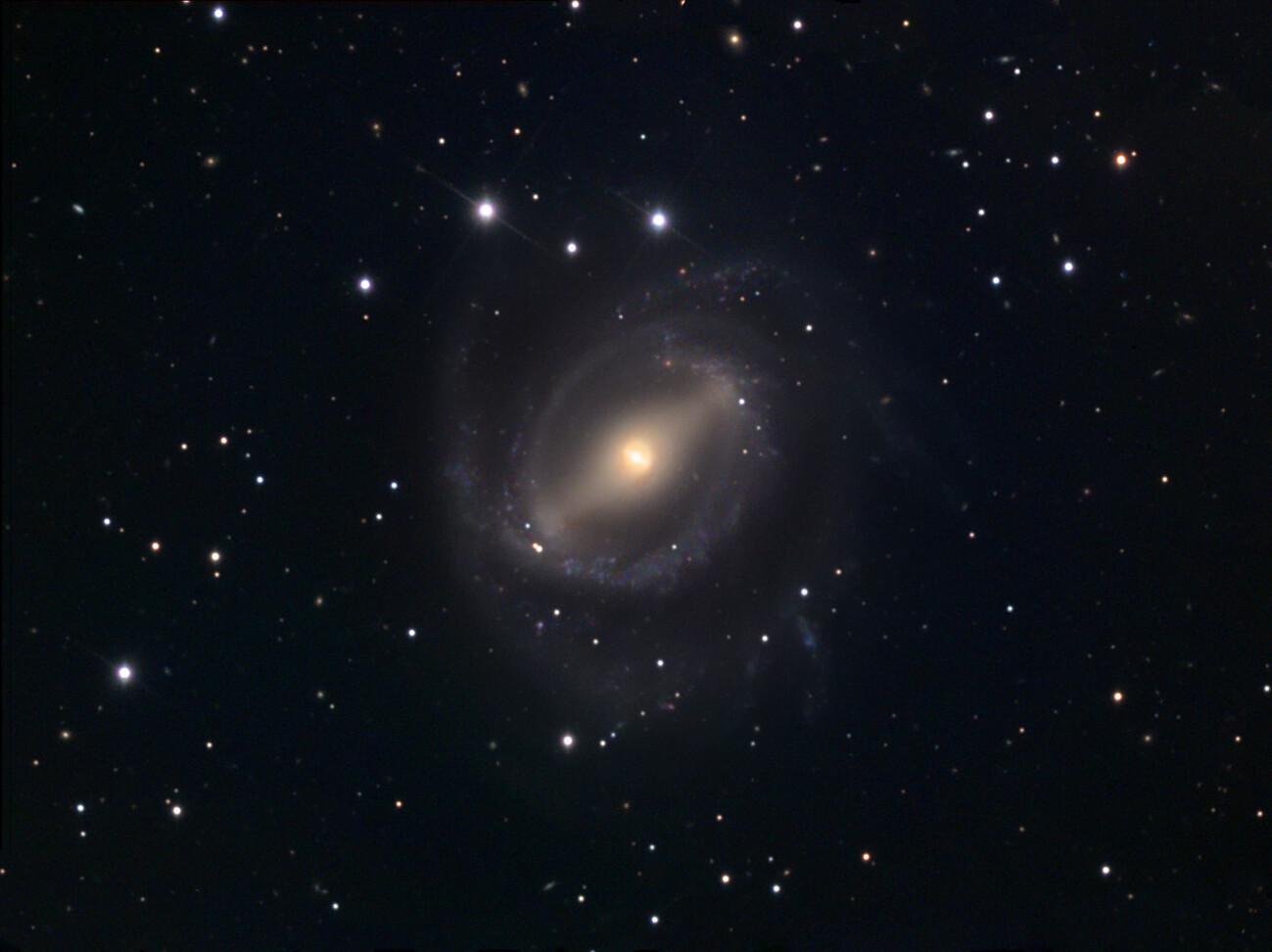

Observation data (J2000 epoch)
- Constellation: Virgo
- Right ascension: 15^{h} 07^{m} 07.6796^{s}
- Declination: +01° 32′ 39.362″
- Redshift: 0.008489
- Heliocentric radial velocity: 2545 ± 2 km/s
- Distance: 131.5 ± 9.2 Mly (40.33 ± 2.83 Mpc)
- Apparent magnitude (B): 11.5
- Surface brightness: 23 mag/arcsec^{2}

Characteristics
- Type: SB(r)b
- Size: ~88,700 ly (27.20 kpc) (estimated)
- Apparent size (V): 4.5′ × 3.9′

Other designations
- IRAS 15045+0144, UGC 9715, MCG +00-39-002, PGC 53979, CGCG 021-006
- References: List of NGC objects (5001-6000)

NGC 5850 is a barred spiral galaxy in the constellation Virgo. Its speed relative to the cosmic microwave background is 2,735 ± 13 km/s, which corresponds to a Hubble distance of 40.3 ± 2.8 Mpc (~131 million ly). NGC 5850 was discovered by German-British astronomer William Herschel on 24 February 1786.

== Characteristics ==
The luminosity class of NGC 5850 is II and it has a broad HI1 line. It is also classified a LINER galaxy; a galaxy whose nucleus presents an emission spectrum characterized by broad lines of weakly ionized atoms.

To date, seven non-redshift measurements yield a distance of 18.7 ± 1.75 Mpc (~61 million ly), which is far outside the Hubble distance values. Note that it is with the average value of independent measurements, when they exist, that the NASA/IPAC database calculates the diameter of a galaxy and that consequently the diameter of NGC 5850 could be approximately 58.7 kpc (~191,000 ly) if we used the Hubble distance to calculate it.

== Morphology ==
NGC 5850 was used by Gérard de Vaucouleurs as a galaxy of morphological type SB(r)b in his galaxy atlas. It is classified as a prototype double-barred system early-type spiral galaxy by other studies as well.

In 2002, Eskridge, Frogel and Pogge published a paper, describing the morphology of 205 closely spaced spiral galaxies. The observations were carried out in the H band of infrared and in the B band (blue). According to Eskridge and his colleagues, NGC 5850 is a spiral galaxy of type SB(r)ab in the B band and type SB(r)0/a in the H band. The isophotes of the outer bulb are almost circular. The nucleus appears elliptical. The bulb is crossed by a very long bar with ansae at its end. The bar is inclined at 60 degrees to the interior bulb. A complete inner ring is formed at the end of the bar and beyond there is a faint spiral structure. The spiral arms appear to form an incomplete outer pseudo-ring. One of these spiral arms of NGC 5850 appears broken, likely caused by an interaction with a north-west object.

== Possible galaxy pair? ==
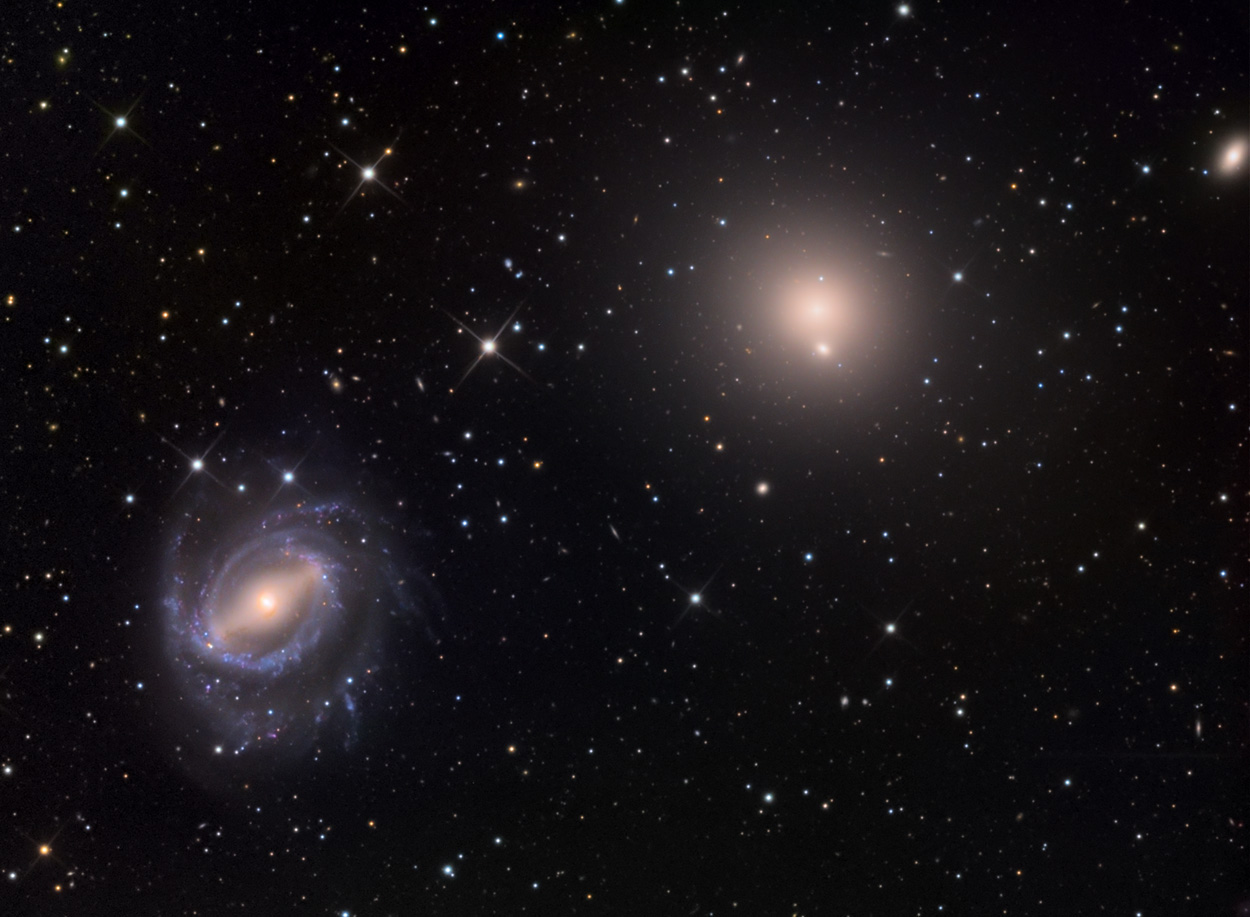
NGC 5850 (left) and NGC 5846 (right) captured by Adam Block (from Mount Lemmon Observatory/University of Arizona).

NGC 5850 is close to its neighbor, NGC 5846. However, the distance between them is exactly 40 million light-years. Although they not a physical pair, it is possible that the two galaxies might have experienced a high-speed encounter around 200 million years ago.

== Supernova ==
One supernova has been observed in NGC 5850: SN 1987B (Type II, mag. 15) was discovered by Robert Evans on 24 February 1987, shining 71" west and 145" south of the nucleus of the galaxy. Spectral analysis indicated that it was a non-conventional Type II supernova.

== See also ==
- NGC 5846, thought to have caused creation of NGC 5850
- List of NGC objects (5001–6000)

== Further bibliography ==
- Aguerri, J. A. L.; Hunter, J. H.; Prieto, M.; Varela, A. M.; Gottesman, S. T.; Muñoz-Tuñón, C. (July 2001). "An hydrodynamical model of the barred galaxy NGC 5850". Astronomy & Astrophysics. 373 (3): 786–795. Bibcode:2001A&A...373..786A. doi:10.1051/0004-6361:20010557.
