= NGC 713 =

Spiral galaxy in the constellation Cetus

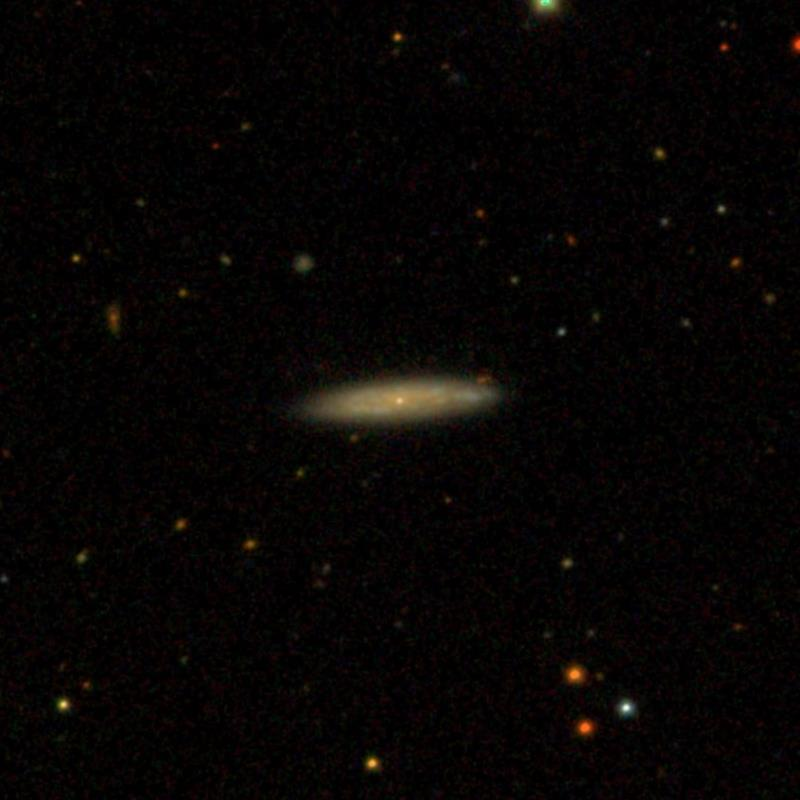
- SDSS image of NGC 713

Observation data (J2000 epoch)
- Constellation: Cetus
- Right ascension: 01^{h} 55^{m} 21.53040^{s}
- Declination: −09° 05′ 01.6672″
- Redshift: 0.0175
- Heliocentric radial velocity: 5200 km/s
- Distance: 239.1 ± 16.8 Mly (73.32 ± 5.15 Mpc)
- Apparent magnitude (B): 15

Characteristics
- Type: Sc(f)

Other designations
- MCG -02-05-075, PGC 7161

NGC 713 is a spiral galaxy located in the constellation of Cetus about 234 million light years from the Milky Way. It was discovered by the American astronomer Francis Leavenworth in 1886.

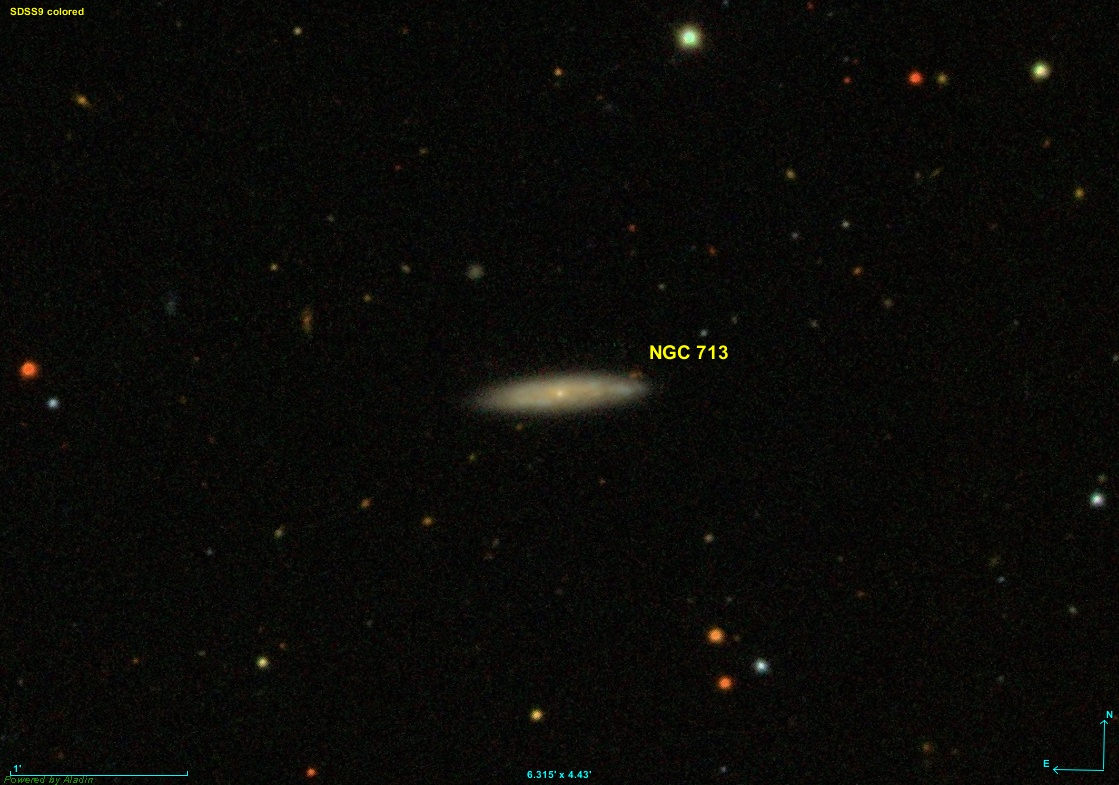
NGC 713 (SDSS)

== See also ==
- List of NGC objects (1–1000)
