= NGC 4688 =

Galaxy in the constellation Virgo

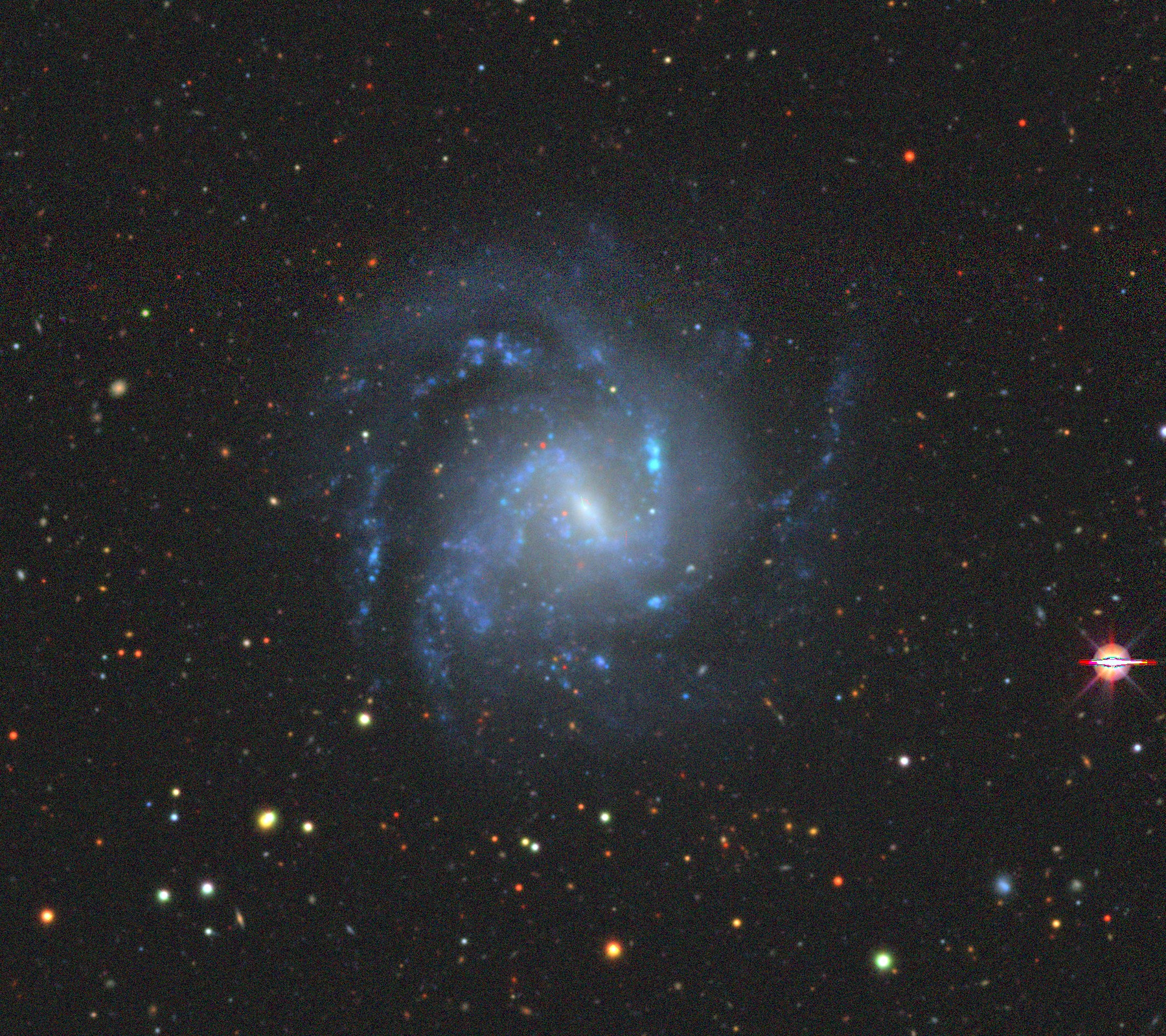
- NGC 4688 imaged by Legacy Surveys

Observation data (J2000 epoch)
- Constellation: Virgo
- Right ascension: 12^{h} 47^{m} 46.5187^{s}
- Declination: +04° 20′ 08.927″
- Redshift: 0.003289±0.00000300
- Heliocentric radial velocity: 986±1 km/s
- Distance: 24.79 ± 8.02 Mly (7.600 ± 2.458 Mpc)
- Group or cluster: M49 group (LGG 292)
- Apparent magnitude (V): 12.62

Characteristics
- Type: SB(s)cd
- Size: ~31,700 ly (9.73 kpc) (estimated)
- Apparent size (V): 3.2′ × 2.8′

Other designations
- HOLM 461A, IRAS 12452+0436, 2MASX J12474646+0420098, UGC 7961, MCG +01-33-013, PGC 43189, CGCG 043-028

NGC 4688 is a barred spiral galaxy in the constellation of Virgo. Its velocity with respect to the cosmic microwave background is 1,318±23 km/s, which corresponds to a Hubble distance of 63.4 ± 4.6 Mly (19.44 ± 1.40 Mpc). However, five non-redshift measurements give a much closer mean distance of 24.79 ± 8.02 Mly (7.600 ± 2.458 Mpc). It was discovered by German-British astronomer William Herschel on 17 April 1786.

NGC 4688 has a possible active galactic nucleus, i.e. it has a compact region at the center of a galaxy that emits a significant amount of energy across the electromagnetic spectrum, with characteristics indicating that this luminosity is not produced by the stars. It is also a LINER galaxy, i.e. a galaxy whose nucleus has an emission spectrum characterized by broad lines of weakly ionized atoms.

== M49 group ==
According to A. M. Garcia, NGC 4688 is a member of the M49 group (also known as LGG 292). This group includes 63 galaxies from the New General Catalogue, including Messier 49, Messier 85, NGC 4516, Messier 60, and 20 galaxies from the Index Catalogue.

== Supernova ==
One supernova has been observed in NGC 4688:

- SN 1966B (Type II, mag. 15.5) was discovered by D. Ya. Martynov on 12 February 1966. Howard S. Gates had photographed it earlier, on 25 January 1966, but he suspected the object might be a minor planet, and delayed the announcement until a confirmation picture could be taken, thus losing credit for the discovery.

== See also ==
- List of NGC objects (4001–5000)
