= NGC 701 =

Galaxy in the constellation Cetus

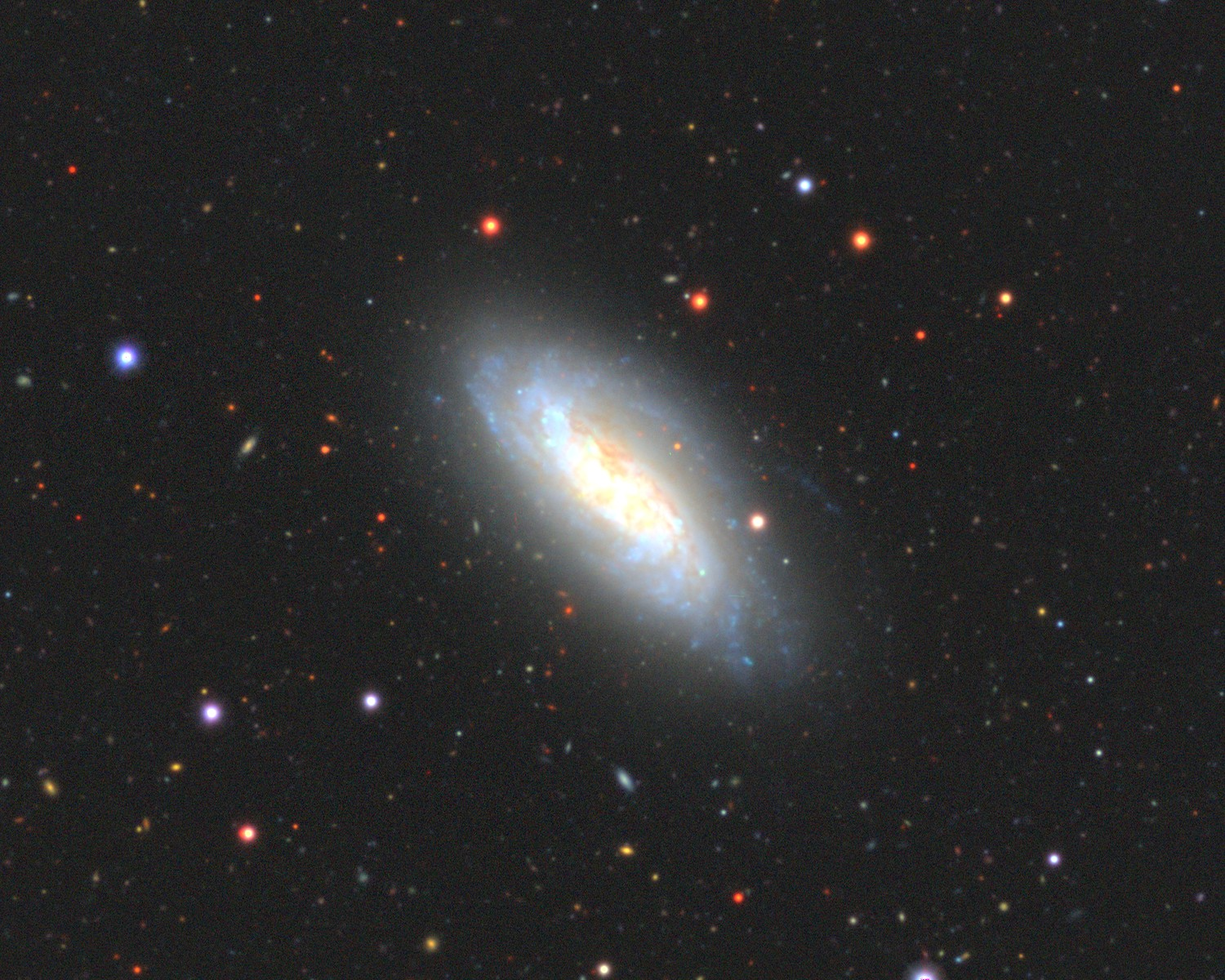
- NGC 701 imaged by Legacy Surveys

Observation data (J2000 epoch)
- Constellation: Cetus
- Right ascension: 01^{h} 51^{m} 03.848^{s}
- Declination: −09° 42′ 09.32″
- Redshift: 0.00611±0.00002
- Heliocentric radial velocity: 1831.13±5.10
- Distance: 85.6 Mly (26.25 Mpc)
- Group or cluster: NGC 681 Group

Characteristics
- Type: SBcd

Other designations
- AGC 410368, PGC 6826

NGC 701 is a spiral galaxy with a high star formation rate in the constellation Cetus. It is estimated to be 86 million light years from the Milky Way and has a diameter of approximately 65,000 light years. The object was discovered on January 10, 1785 by the German-British astronomer William Herschel.

NGC 701 is a member of the MCG 02-05-053 Group (also known as LGG 33), which contains four galaxies, including NGC 701, NGC 681, MCG 02-05-053 and IC 1738.

== Supernova ==
One supernova has been observed in NGC 701.

- SN 2004fc (Type II, mag. 15.5) was discovered by the Lick Observatory Supernova Search (LOSS) on 21 October 2004. A precovery image had been taken by Kōichi Itagaki on 16 October 2004, which showed the supernova at magnitude 15.4.
