= NGC 731 =

Galaxy in the constellation Cetus

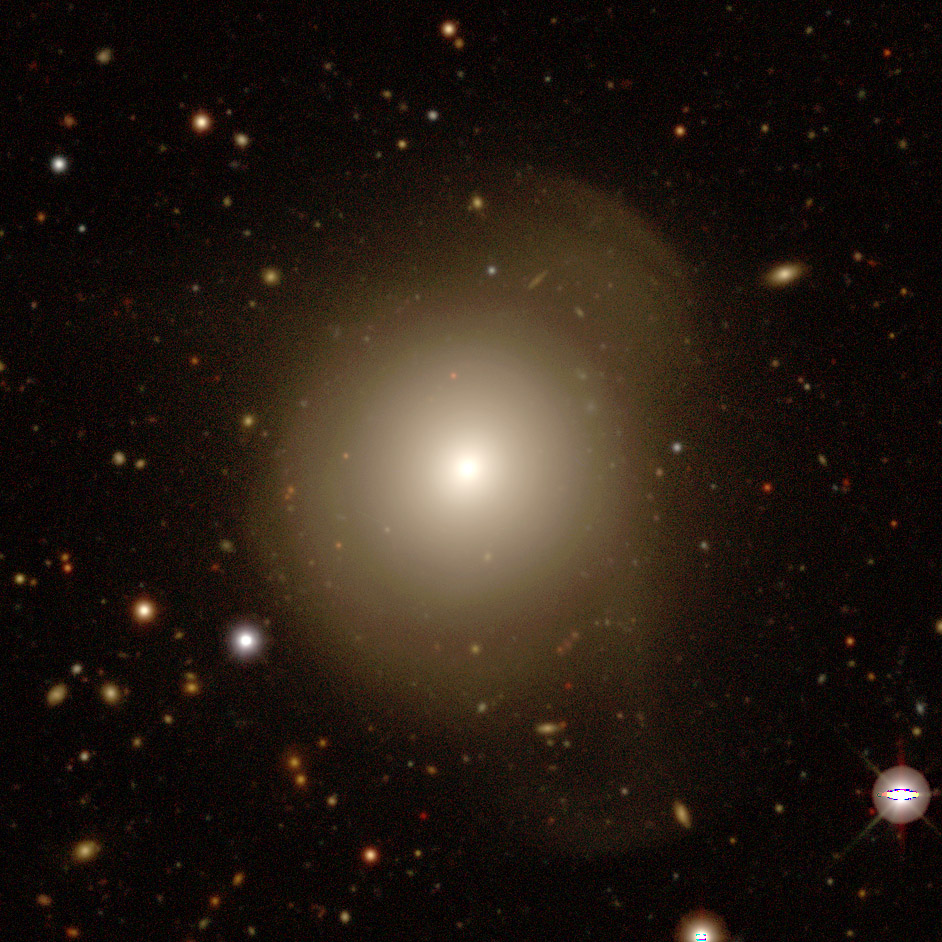
- legacy surveys image of NGC 731

Observation data (J2000 epoch)
- Constellation: Cetus
- Right ascension: 01^{h} 54^{m} 56.208^{s}
- Declination: −09° 00′ 38.90″
- Redshift: 0.01301
- Heliocentric radial velocity: 3875 km/s
- Distance: 172 Mly (52.7 Mpc)
- Apparent magnitude (V): 12.14
- Apparent magnitude (B): 13.06

Characteristics
- Type: E, cD:

Other designations
- MCG -02-05-073, PGC 7118

NGC 731 is an elliptical galaxy located in the constellation of Cetus about 172 million light-years away from the Milky Way. It was discovered by William Herschel on January 10, 1785. It has a luminosity of 3.9×10^{10} L_{☉}.
