= NGC 767 =

Galaxy located in the constellation Cetus

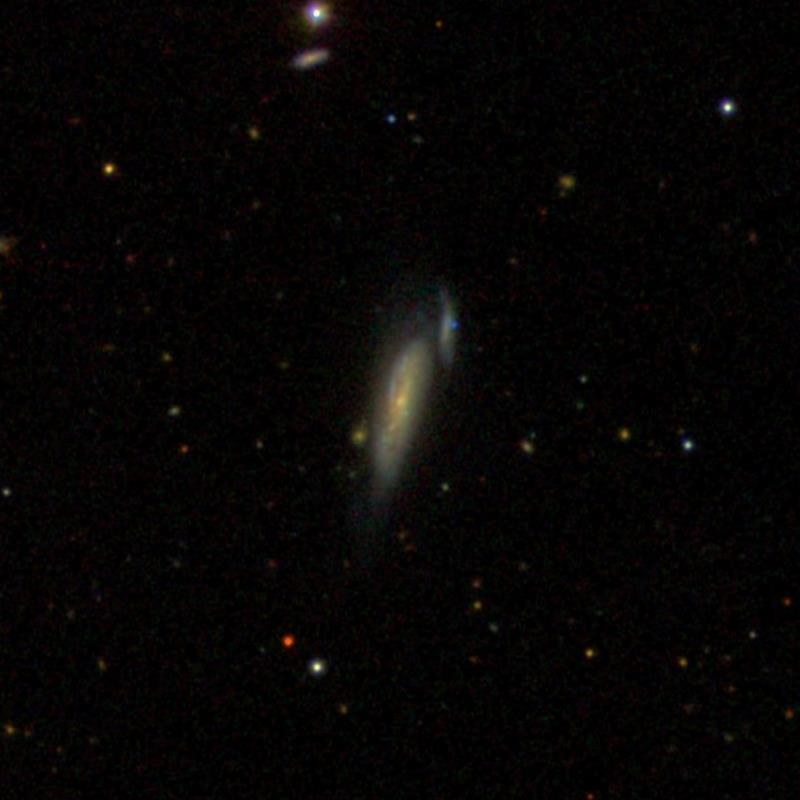
- SDSS image of NGC 767

Observation data (J2000 epoch)
- Constellation: Cetus
- Right ascension: 01^{h} 58^{m} 50.822^{s}
- Declination: −09° 35′ 13.61″
- Redshift: 0.01805
- Heliocentric radial velocity: 5362 km/s
- Distance: 246.5 ± 17.3 Mly (75.58 ± 5.3 Mpc)
- Apparent magnitude (B): 14

Characteristics
- Type: SBb pec?

Other designations
- MCG -02-06-010, PGC 7483

NGC 767 is a barred spiral galaxy located in the constellation Cetus about 241 million light years from the Milky Way. It was discovered by the American astronomer Francis Leavenworth in 1886.

One supernova has been observed in NGC 767: SN 2019lre (type II, mag. 19.2).

== See also ==
- List of NGC objects (1–1000)
