= NGC 4440 =

Galaxy in the constellation Virgo

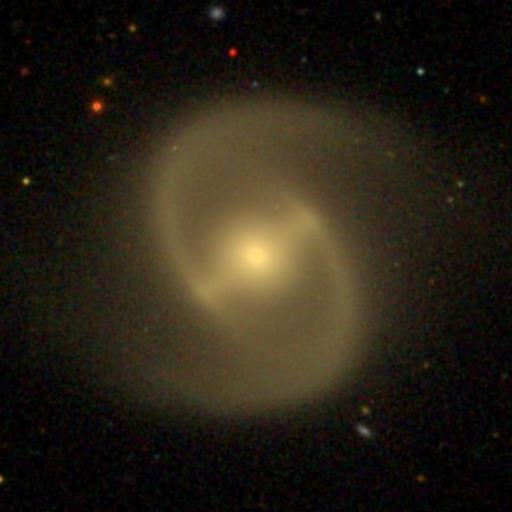
- SDSS image of NGC 4440

Observation data (J2000 epoch)
- Constellation: Virgo
- Right ascension: 12^{h} 27^{m} 53.6^{s}
- Declination: 12° 17′ 36″
- Redshift: 0.002415/724 km/s
- Distance: 56,400,000 ly
- Group or cluster: Virgo Cluster
- Apparent magnitude (V): 12.70

Characteristics
- Type: SB(rs)a
- Size: ~30,550 ly (estimated)
- Apparent size (V): 1.9 x 1.5

Other designations
- PGC 40927, UGC 7581, VCC 1047

NGC 4440 is a barred spiral galaxy located about 55 million light-years away in the constellation of Virgo. NGC 4440 was discovered by astronomer William Herschel on April 17, 1784. It is a member of the Virgo Cluster.

== Physical characteristics ==
NGC 4440 has a strong bar in its structure. Surrounding the bar, there are two very open spiral arms.

== See also ==
- List of NGC objects (4001–5000)
