= NGC 755 =

Galaxy in the constellation Cetus

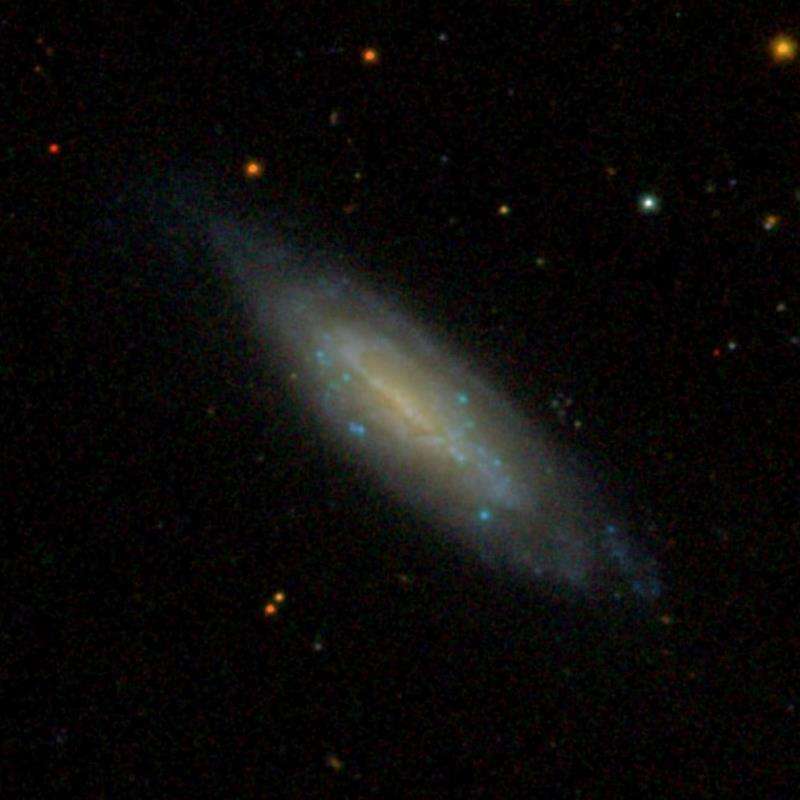
- NGC 755 as seen from the Sloan Digital Sky Survey

Observation data (J2000 epoch)
- Constellation: Cetus
- Right ascension: 01^{h} 56^{m} 22.685^{s}
- Declination: −09° 03′ 41.15″
- Redshift: 0.005490
- Heliocentric radial velocity: 1641.2 km/s
- Distance: 69 Mly (21.3 Mpc)
- Apparent magnitude (B): 13.2
- Absolute magnitude (V): −18.27

Characteristics
- Type: SBcd

Other designations
- NGC 763, MCG -02-06-005, PGC 7262

NGC 755 is an emission line spiral galaxy in the constellation of Cetus. The galaxy's velocity of 1641.2 km/s was used to calculate its distance using the Tully–Fisher relation. Its dark matter halo was found to be core-dominated, in agreement with predictions from the lambda-CDM model of cosmology.
