= NGC 4587 =

Galaxy in the constellation Virgo

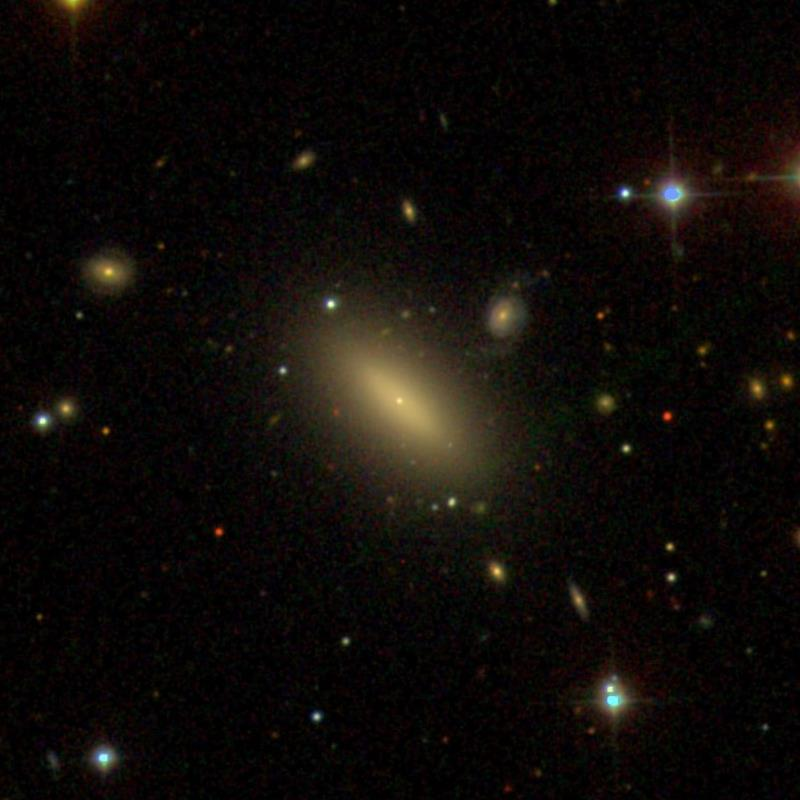

NGC 4587 is a lenticular galaxy located in the constellation Virgo. It was discovered by Johann Palisa on April 17, 1882. It is part of the Virgo Cluster.
