= NGC 681 =

Spiral galaxy in the constellation Cetus

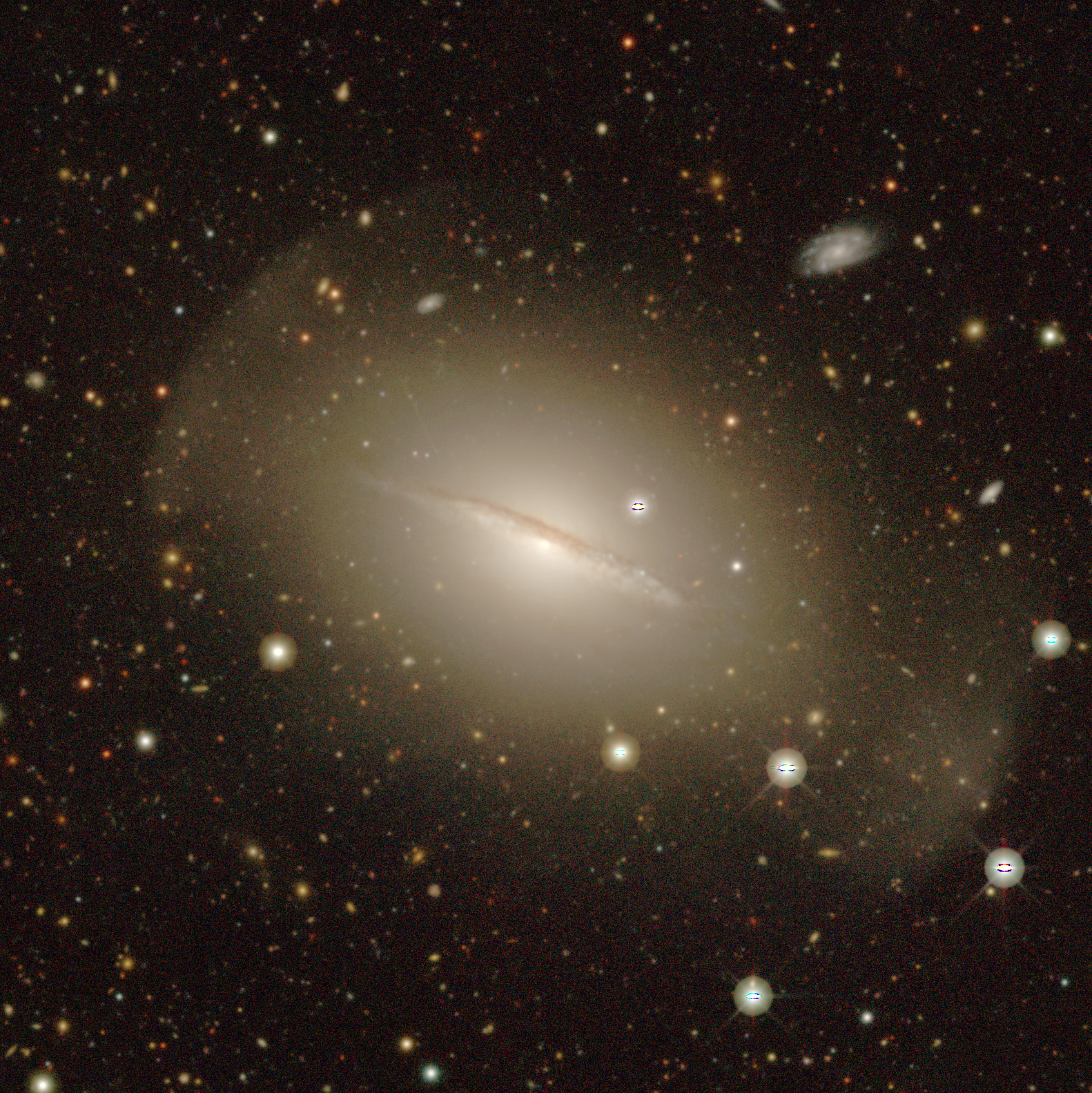
- NGC 681 imaged by Legacy Surveys

Observation data (J2000 epoch)
- Constellation: Cetus
- Right ascension: 01^{h} 49^{m} 10.829^{s}
- Declination: −10° 25′ 35.13″
- Redshift: 0.00587 ± 0.00002
- Heliocentric radial velocity: 1760.4 ± 6.6 km/s
- Distance: ~66.5 million ly (20.39 ± 1.45 Mpc)
- Group or cluster: MCG -02-05-053 Group (LGG 33)
- Apparent magnitude (V): 12

Characteristics
- Type: SAB(s)ab
- Mass: 1.9×10^{10} M_{☉}
- Mass/Light ratio: 3.6 M_{☉}/L_{☉}
- Size: ~29.07 kpc (diameter)
- Apparent size (V): 2.70 × 1.8 arcmin

Other designations
- IRAS 01467-1040, MCG -02-05-052, PGC 6671

NGC 681 is an intermediate spiral galaxy in the constellation of Cetus, located approximately 66.5 million light-years from Earth.

NGC 681 is a member of the MCG -02-05-053 group (also known as LGG 33), which contains four galaxies, including NGC 701 and IC 1738.

== Observation history ==
NGC 681 was discovered by the German-born British astronomer William Herschel on 28 November 1785 and was later also observed by William's son, John Herschel. John Louis Emil Dreyer, compiler of the first New General Catalogue of Nebulae and Clusters of Stars, described NGC 681 as being a "pretty faint, considerably large, round, small (faint) star 90 arcsec to [the] west" that becomes "gradually a little brighter [in the] middle".

== Physical characteristics ==
NGC 681 shares many structural similarities with the Sombrero Galaxy, M104, although it is smaller, less luminous, and less massive. Its thin, dusty disc is seen almost perfectly edge-on and features a small, very bright nucleus in the center of a very pronounced bulge. Distinctly unlike M104, NGC 681's disc contains many H II regions, where star formation is likely to be occurring. The galaxy has a mass of 1.9×10^{10} M_{☉}, a mass-to-light ratio of 3.6 $\Upsilon\odot$, and a spiral pattern which is asymmetrical.

The SIMBAD database lists NGC 681 as a Seyfert II Galaxy, i.e. it has a quasar-like nucleus with very high surface brightnesses whose spectra reveal strong, high-ionisation emission lines, but unlike quasars, the host galaxy is clearly detectable.

== Supernova ==
One supernova has been observed in NGC 681.

- SN 2024abup (Type Ic-BL, mag. 17.018) was discovered by ATLAS on 22 November 2024.

== Image gallery ==
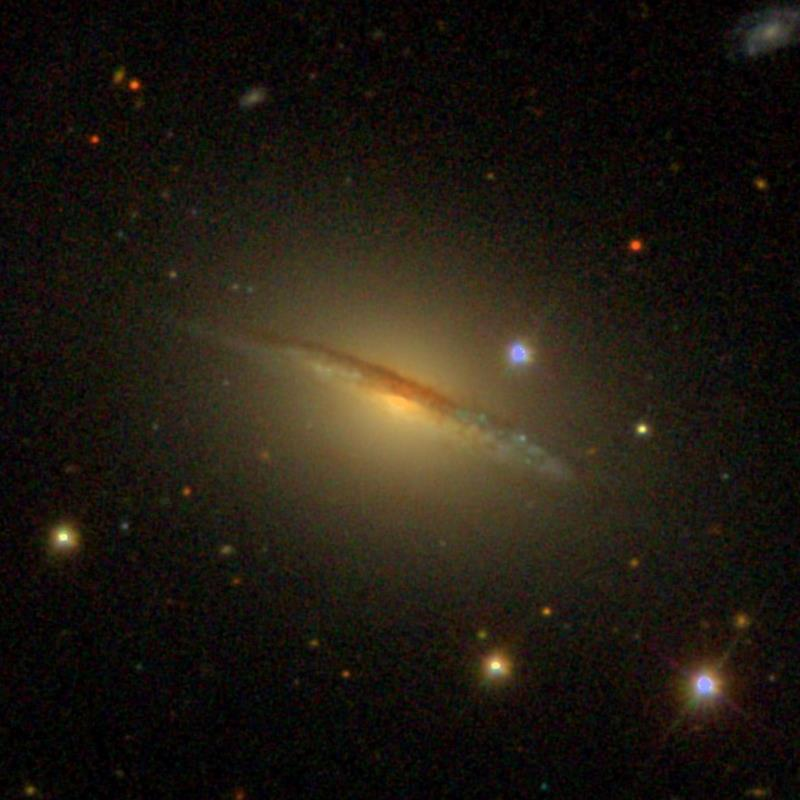
SDSS image of NGC 681

== See also ==
- List of NGC objects (1–1000)
- Sombrero Galaxy
- Messier object
- List of spiral galaxies
