= NGC 4457 =

Galaxy in the constellation of Virgo

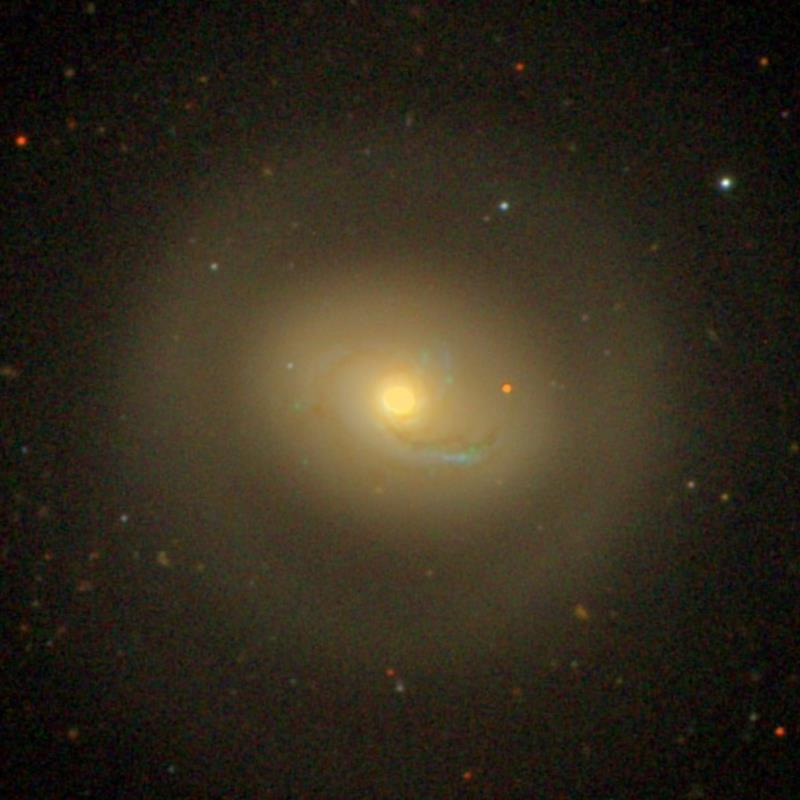
- SDSS image of NGC 4457

Observation data (J2000 epoch)
- Constellation: Virgo
- Right ascension: 12^{h} 28^{m} 59.0^{s}
- Declination: 03° 34′ 14″
- Redshift: 0.002942
- Heliocentric radial velocity: 882 km/s
- Distance: 54,801,600 ly
- Group or cluster: Virgo II Groups
- Apparent magnitude (V): 11.76

Characteristics
- Type: (R)SAB(s)0/a, LINER
- Size: ~ 38,687.32 ly
- Apparent size (V): 2.7 × 2.3

Other designations
- VCC 1145, IRAS 12264+0350, UGC 7609, MCG +01-32-075, PGC 41101, CGCG 042-124

NGC 4457 is an intermediate spiral galaxy located about 55 million light-years away in the constellation of Virgo. It is also classified as a LINER galaxy, a class of active galaxy defined by their spectral line emissions. NGC 4457 Is inclined by about 33°. It was discovered by astronomer William Herschel on February 23, 1784. Despite being listed in the Virgo Cluster Catalog as VCC 1145, NGC 4457 is a member of the Virgo II Groups which form an extension of the Virgo cluster.

NGC 4457 may have had a recent minor merger with another galaxy.

== Supernova ==
On July 1, 2020, an astronomical transient was discovered in NGC 4457 by astronomer Kōichi Itagaki and confirmed by ASAS-SN. Spectroscopic classification determined the object to be a Type Ia Supernova, designated SN 2020nvb.

== Physical characteristics ==
NGC 4457 has a broad oval zone containing an inner spiral which is defined mainly by two fairly open arms. There is a well-defined outer ring that is completely detached from the inner regions of the galaxy.

=== Truncated disk ===
NGC 4457 has a severely reduced amount of star-formation in its disk while its inner regions have a normalized rate of massive star formation. This may have been caused by a recent interaction of the gas in the galaxy with the gas in the surrounding Virgo Cluster, causing the gas to be stripped away in an effect known as ram-pressure stripping.

== See also ==
- List of NGC objects (4001–5000)
- Messier 90
- Comet Galaxy - a distant galaxy in the cluster Abell 2667 which is experiencing ram-pressure stripping as well
