= NGC 4200 =

Galaxy in the constellation of Virgo

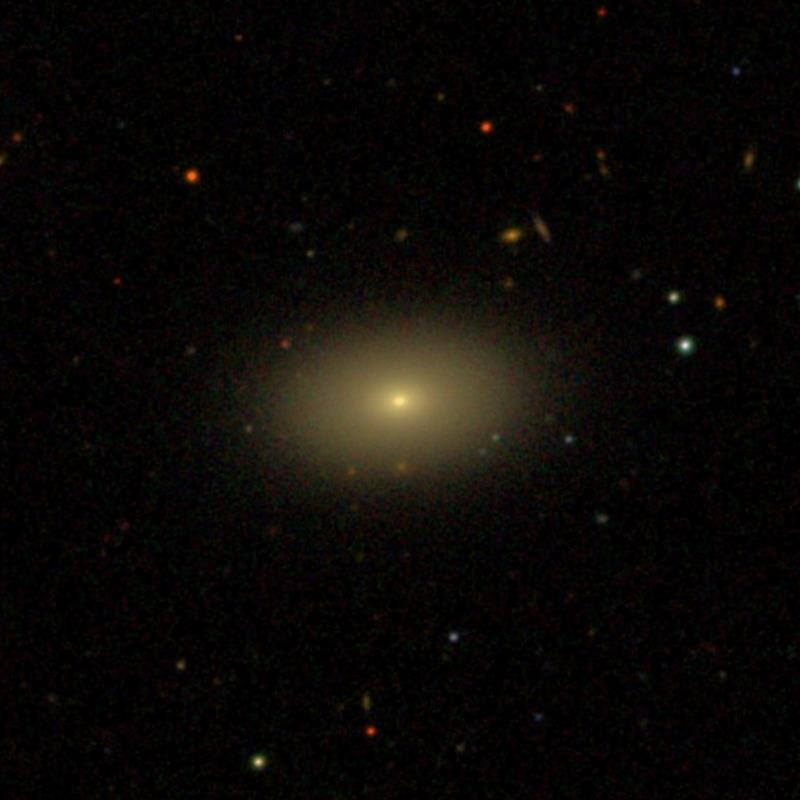
- SDSS image of NGC 4200

Observation data (J2000 epoch)
- Constellation: Virgo
- Right ascension: 12^{h} 14^{m} 44.225^{s}
- Declination: +12° 10′ 50.70″
- Redshift: 0.00781
- Heliocentric radial velocity: 2332 km/s
- Distance: 79 Mly (24.2 Mpc)

Characteristics
- Type: S0
- Size: 1.445′

Other designations
- UGC 7251, MCG +02-31-057, PGC 39124

NGC 4200 is a small lenticular galaxy located in the constellation of Virgo. NGC 4200 was discovered by the German-British astronomer William Herschel in 1784.

== The M49 and M60 groups and the Virgo Cluster ==
According to A.M. Garcia, NGC 4200 is one of the many galaxies in the M49 group (127 in total), which he described in an article published in 1993. This list includes 63 galaxies from the New General Catalogue, including NGC 4382 (M85), NGC 4472 (M49), NGC 4649 (M60), as well as 20 galaxies from the Index Catalogue.

On the other hand, NGC 4423 also appears in a list of 227 galaxies in an article published by Abraham Mahtessian in 1998. This list includes more than 200 galaxies from the New General Catalogue and about fifteen galaxies from the Index Catalogue. Ten other galaxies from the Messier Catalogue are also found in this list: M49, M58, M60, M61, M85, M87, M88, M91, M99, and M100.

Not all the galaxies in Mahtessian's list actually constitute a single galaxy group. Rather, they are several groups of galaxies, all part of a galaxy cluster, the Virgo Cluster. To avoid confusion with the Virgo Cluster, this collection of galaxies can be called the M60 Group, as M60 is one of the brightest galaxies on the list. The Virgo Cluster is indeed much larger and is estimated to contain around 1,300 galaxies, and possibly more than 2,000, located at the core of the Virgo Supercluster, which includes the Local Group.

Many galaxies in Mahtessian's list are found in eleven groups described in the article by AM Garcia, namely the NGC 4123 group (7 galaxies), the NGC 4261 group (13 galaxies), the NGC 4235 group (29 galaxies), the M88 group (13 galaxies, M88 = NGC 4501), the NGC 4461 group (9 galaxies), the M61 group (32 galaxies, M61 = NGC 4303), the NGC 4442 group (13 galaxies), the M87 group (96 galaxies, M87 = NGC 4486), the M49 group (127 galaxies, M49 = NGC 4472), the NGC 4535 group (14 galaxies) and the NGC 4753 group (15 galaxies). These eleven groups are part of the Virgo Cluster and contain 396 galaxies. However, some galaxies from Mahtessian's list do not appear in any of Garcia's groups, and vice versa.
