= NGC 4691 =

Galaxy in the constellation Virgo

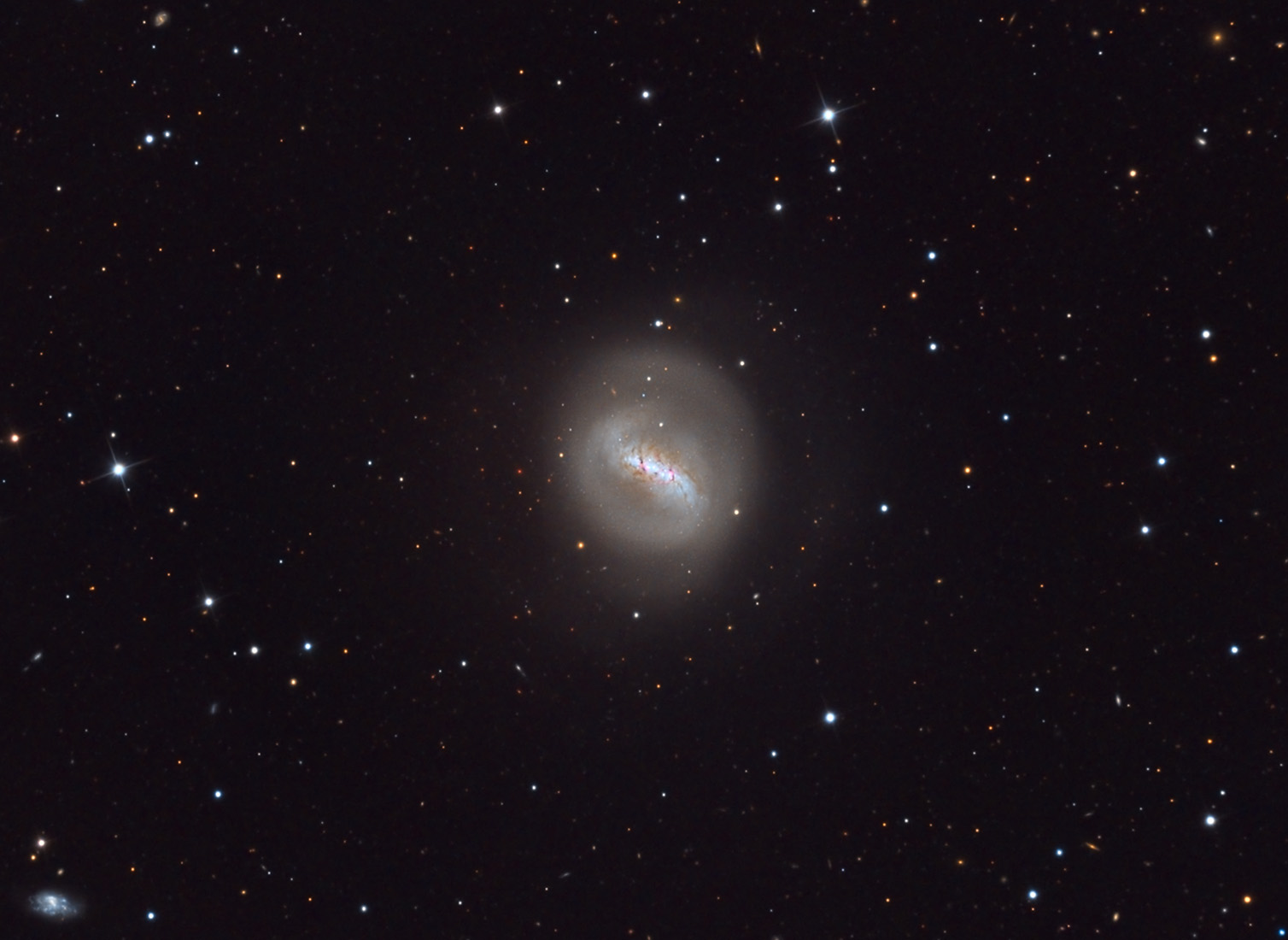
- NGC 4691 imaged by the Schulman 0.8m Telescope at Mount Lemmon Observatory

Observation data (J2000 epoch)
- Constellation: Virgo
- Right ascension: 12^{h} 48^{m} 13.5998^{s}
- Declination: −03° 19′ 57.734″
- Redshift: 0.003736 ± 0.000007
- Heliocentric radial velocity: 1,120 ± 2 km/s
- Distance: 69.5 ± 4.4 Mly (21.3 ± 1.3 Mpc)
- Group or cluster: NGC 4753 Group
- Apparent magnitude (V): 11.1

Characteristics
- Type: (R)SB(s)0/a pec
- Size: ~67,300 ly (20.63 kpc) (estimated)
- Apparent size (V): 2.52′ × 1.46′

Other designations
- IRAS 12456-0303, UGCA 299, MCG +00-33-013, PGC 43238, CGCG 015-023

NGC 4691 is a barred spiral galaxy in the constellation Virgo. The galaxy lies about 70 million light years away from Earth, which means, given its apparent dimensions, that NGC 4691 is approximately 60,000 light years across. It was discovered by German-British astronomer William Herschel on 17 April 1784.

== Characteristics ==
The galaxy has a prominent bar with some bright knots. From the bar emerge two diffuse low-surface-brightness spiral arms which are devoid of knots. The arms form a nearly complete outer ring. Dust is visible across the inner regions of the galaxy. The dust lanes are generally perpendicular to the major axis of the bar. The galaxy is seen face-on. The total molecular gas of the galaxy based on CO emission is estimated to be about 9×10^{8} M_{☉}. Two large molecular clouds are visible along the bar in each side of the nucleus and one more is seen perpendicularly to the bar, located within the inner Lindblad resonance.

The nucleus of the galaxy has been categorised as active, however there is no evidence of it being active in optical wavelengths, but it is a star forming region (HII region) instead. A broad H-alpha component has been observed in the central region of the galaxy that is blueshifted by about 500 km/s in respect to the galaxy, indicating it is an outflow that pushes gas away from the plane of the galaxy. It is possible the outflow was created by supernova remnants in the circumnuclear star forming regions.

== Supernova ==
One supernova has been observed in NGC 4691. SN 1997X was discovered by Masakatsu Aoki on 1 February 1997 at an apparent magnitude of 13.6. It got as bright as magnitude 13.5, making it the brightest supernova of 1997. It has been identified spectrographically as a type Ic supernova about one week post maximum.

== Nearby galaxies ==
NGC 4691 forms a pair with NGC 4684, which lies 19 arcminutes away. However the difference in redshift is about 470 km/s, indicating that the pairing is likely a projection effect. NGC 4691 is a member of the NGC 4753 Group, along with NGC 4629, NGC 4753, NGC 4771, NGC 4772, NGC 4845, and NGC 4904. It is part of a Virgo II Groups, a chain of groups extending from the Virgo Cluster.

== Gallery ==
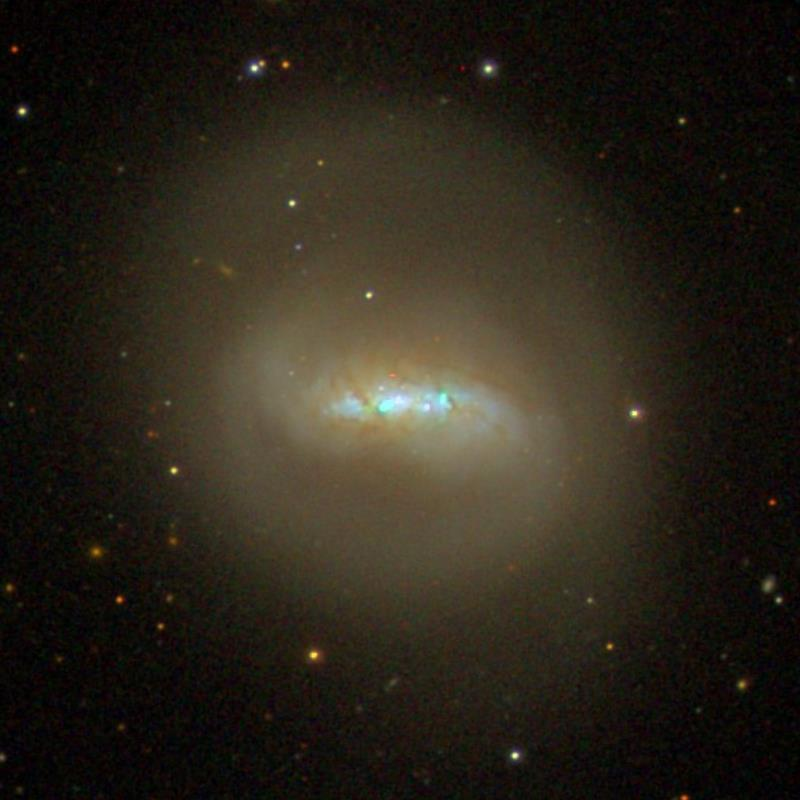
NGC 4691 imaged by SDSS
