= NGC 4772 =

Galaxy in the constellation Virgo

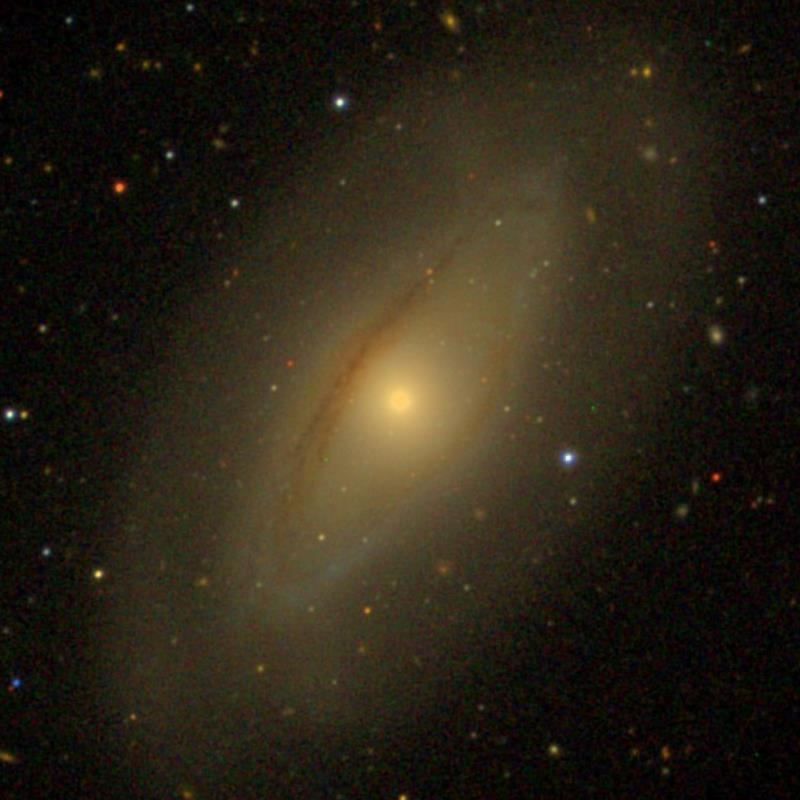
- NGC 4772 imaged by SDSS

Observation data (J2000 epoch)
- Constellation: Virgo
- Right ascension: 12^{h} 53^{m} 29.1613^{s}
- Declination: +02° 10′ 06.157″
- Redshift: 0.003469 ± 0.000017
- Heliocentric radial velocity: 1,040 ± 5 km/s
- Distance: 88.2 ± 30.1 Mly (27.0 ± 9.2 Mpc)
- Group or cluster: NGC 4753 Group
- Apparent magnitude (V): 10.7

Characteristics
- Type: SA(s)a
- Size: ~87,000 ly (26.6 kpc) (estimated)
- Apparent size (V): 3.4′ × 1.7′

Other designations
- UGC 8021, MCG +00-33-018, PGC 43798, CGCG 015-032

NGC 4772 is a spiral galaxy in the constellation Virgo. The galaxy lies about 90 million light years away from Earth based on redshift-independent methods, which means, given its apparent dimensions, that NGC 4772 is approximately 85,000 light years across. Based on redshift the galaxy lies at a distance of 13.3 Mpc (43.4 Mly). It was discovered by William Herschel on January 24, 1784.

== Characteristics ==
NGC 4772 has a bright circular galactic bulge. The galaxy has a long and broad low-surface-brightness bar in the bulge. The kinematics of the central region indicate the presence of a misaligned bar or disk. However it could also indicate the presence of counter-rotating gas, with the galaxy being at the late stages of a minor merger. The central region of the galaxy is depleted in hydrogen and also has low carbon monoxide emission. The nucleus of the galaxy has been found to be active and based on its spectrum it has been characterised as a type 1.9 LINER.

The galaxy has two faint, narrow arms which wrap around the galaxy and form a ring. An outer ring is visible, but appears segmented on its northern and southern part. A dust lane surrounds the bulge. The dust lane has some filaments which resemble a spiral structure. The dust lane region also features H-alpha and hydrogen line emission. The hydrogen emission is distributed in two rings around the nucleus. The inner ring has a radius of 60 arcseconds and the outer ring a radius of 200 arcseconds. There is a faint blue stellar location at the outer ring, while the inner ring coincides with active star formation regions. The two rings have slightly different position angles. Carbon monoxide emission is asymmetric and is distributed along the inner hydrogen ring. The star formation rate of the galaxy is about 0.03 M_{☉} per year.

=== Supernovae ===
Two supernovae have been observed in NGC 4772:

- SN 1988E was discovered on 20 January 1988 by Yoshiaki Taniguchi at an apparent magnitude of 17. It was initially identified as a Type II supernova well past maximum, but further observations found it was depleted in hydrogen and was thus reclassified as a Type I supernova about 300 days post maximum light.
- SN 2012cu was discovered on 14 June 2012 by Kōichi Itagaki at an apparent magnitude of 16.3. Its spectrum revealed it was a Type Ia supernova near maximum light. The supernova was highly reddened due to extinction by dust.

== Nearby galaxies ==
NGC 4772 is a member of the NGC 4753 Group, along with NGC 4629, NGC 4691, NGC 4753, NGC 4771, NGC 4845, and NGC 4904. It is part of a Virgo II Groups, a chain of groups extending from the Virgo Cluster. NGC 4772 lies near the outer regions of the Virgo Cluster and has been considered an outlying member of it. The high-surface brightness galaxy CGCG 015-036 lies 18.5 arcminutes away, while the galaxy pair of NGC 4809 and NGC 4810 lies 35 arcminutes to the northeast and at a similar redshift.

== Gallery ==
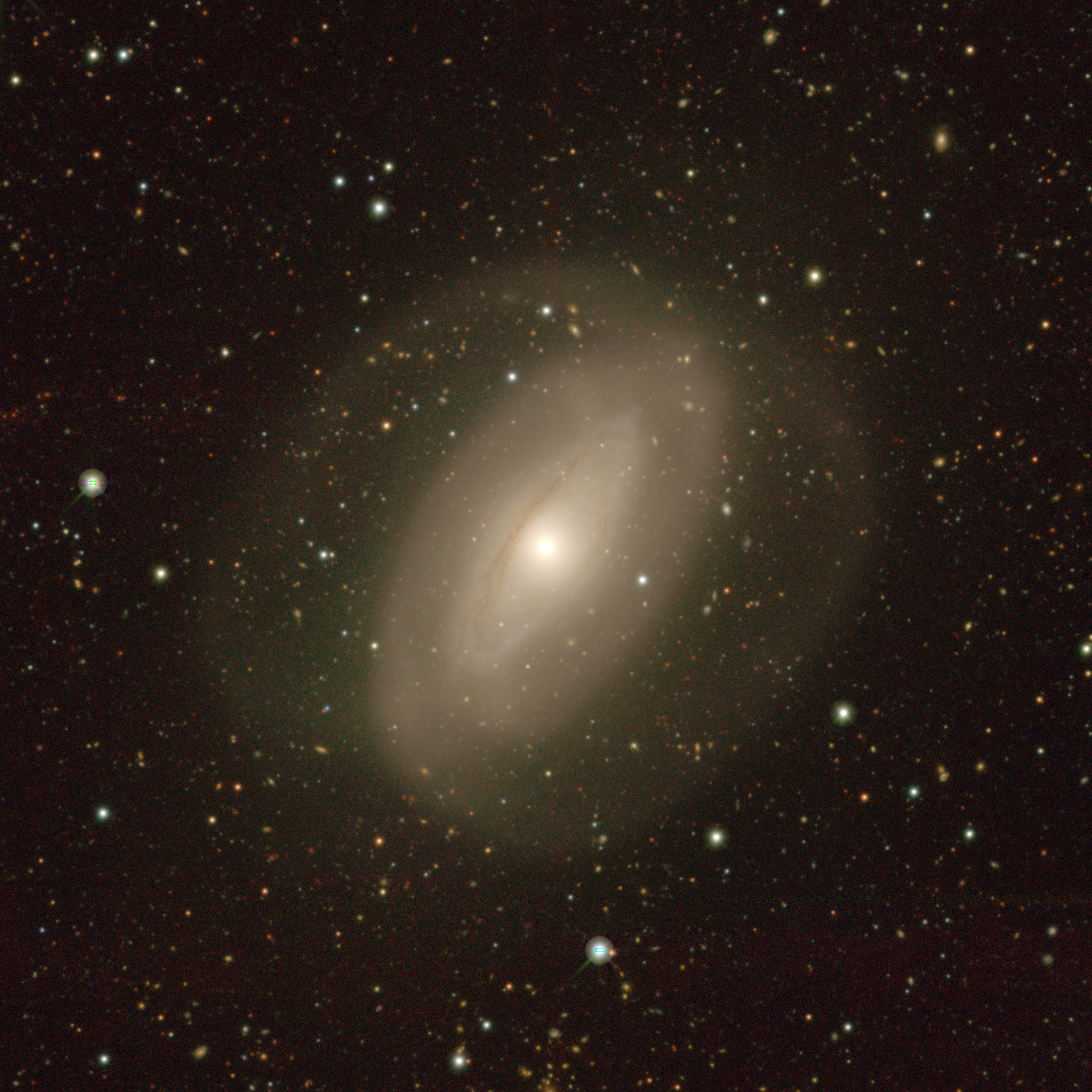
NGC 4772 by the Legacy Survey

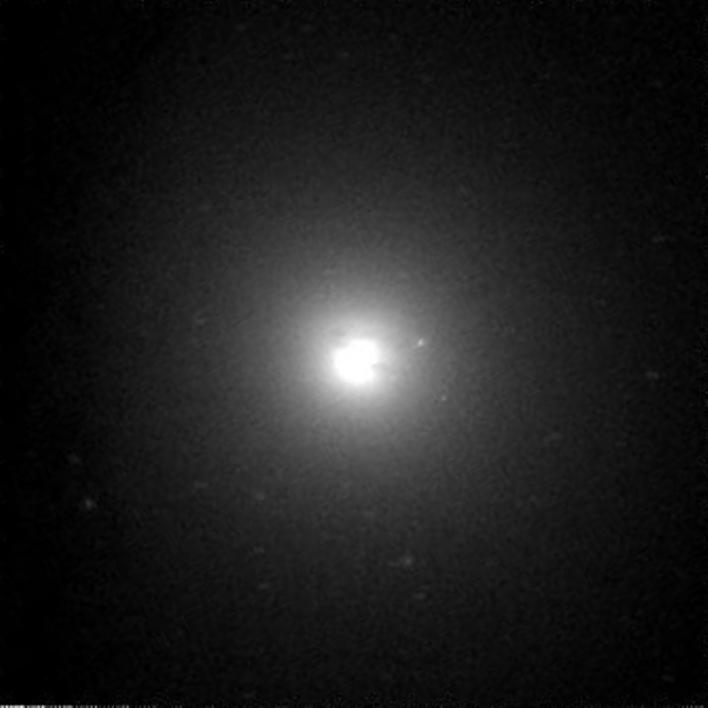
NGC 4772 by the Hubble Space Telescope
