= Lost Galaxy =

Lost Galaxy may also refer to:

- Power Rangers: Lost Galaxy
- NGC 4526, also known as the Lost Galaxy
- NGC 4535, also known as the Lost Galaxy of Copeland
