= NGC 7343 =

Galaxy in the constellation Pegasus

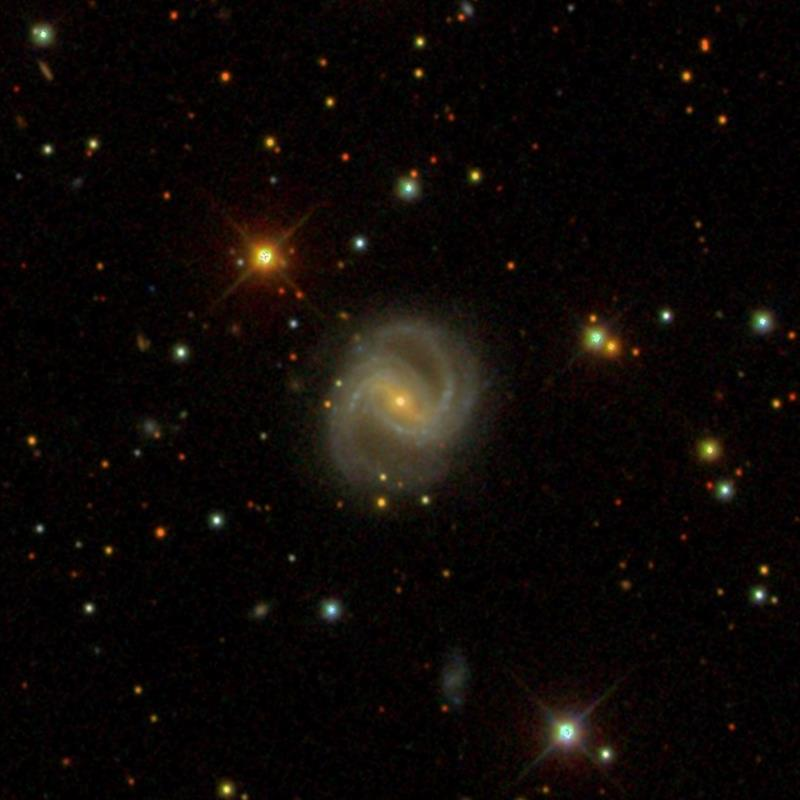
- NGC 7343 imaged by the Sloan Digital Sky Survey

Observation data (J2000 epoch)
- Constellation: Pegasus
- Right ascension: 22^{h} 38^{m} 37.8618^{s}
- Declination: +34° 04′ 17.307″
- Apparent magnitude (V): 13.5
- Apparent magnitude (B): 14.4
- Surface brightness: 13.26 mag/arcsec2
- Magnitude (J): 11.464
- Magnitude (H): 10.801
- Magnitude (K): 10.469

Characteristics
- Size: ~90,500 ly (27.75 kpc) (estimated)

Other designations
- IRAS 22363+3348, UGC 12129, MCG +06-49-059, PGC 69391, CGCG 514-082

NGC 7343 is a barred spiral galaxy located in the constellation Pegasus. Its velocity relative to the cosmic microwave background is 7150 ± 24 km/s, which corresponds to a Hubble distance of 105.5 ± 7.4 Mpc (~344 million ly). NGC 7343 was discovered by American astronomer Truman Safford in 1866. It was independently rediscovered by French astronomer Édouard Stephan on September 27, 1873.

The luminosity class of NGC 7343 is II-III and it has a broad HI line. In addition, it is also a LINER galaxy, a galaxy whose nucleus presents an emission spectrum characterized by broad lines of weakly ionized atoms. To date, eight non-redshift measurements yield a distance of 65.787 ± 44.256 Mpc (~215 million ly), which is outside the Hubble distance values.

== Supernova ==
One supernova has been observed in NGC 7343:

- SN 1974J (Type Ia, mag. 15.5) was discovered by Italian astronomer Leonida Rosino on 9 October 1974.

== See also ==
- List of NGC objects (7001–7840)
