= NGC 4442 =

Galaxy in the constellation of Virgo

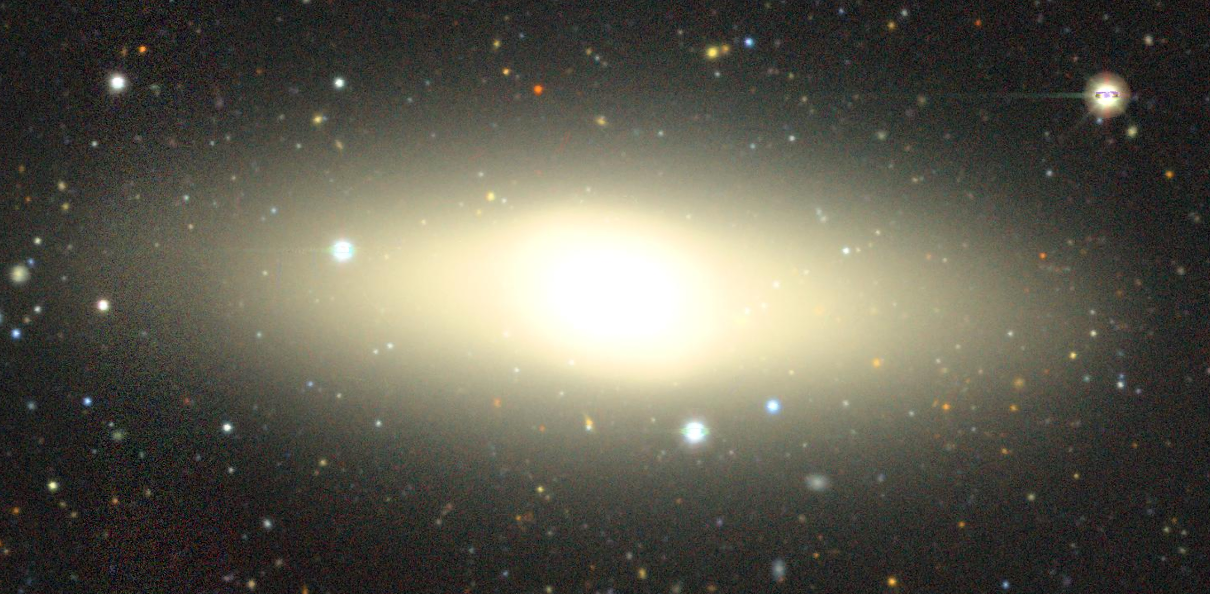
- DESI Legacy DR10 image of NGC 4442

Observation data (J2000 epoch)
- Constellation: Virgo
- Right ascension: 12^{h} 28^{m} 03.88^{s}
- Declination: +09° 48′ 13.43″
- Redshift: 0.00117±0.00008
- Heliocentric radial velocity: 352 km/s
- Distance: 50.1 Mly (15.35 Mpc)
- Group or cluster: Virgo Cluster
- Apparent magnitude (V): 10.4

Characteristics
- Type: SB0
- Mass: 162.2 billion M_{☉}
- Size: 83,100 ly (25,490 pc)
- Apparent size (V): 4.5′ × 1.8′

Other designations
- NGC 4442, UGC 7583, LEDA 40950, Z 70-100, VCC 1062

NGC 4442 is a barred lenticular galaxy in the constellation of Virgo. With the catalogue identifier UGC 7583, it is as an active galaxy that is infrared luminous. This galaxy is 50.1 million light-years (15.35 megaparsecs) away at a spectroscopic redshift z = 0.00117. The galaxy has a visual magnitude of 10.4, which is visible using a telescope with an aperture of 6 inches or more, and it can be observed in both hemispheres during certain times of the year. The galaxy is located in the Virgo Cluster, along with other notable galaxies such as Messier 87 and the Eyes Galaxies. The galaxy was discovered on April 15, 1784 by German-British astronomer, William Herschel.

== Physical properties ==
NGC 4442 is medium-sized barred lenticular galaxy located in the Virgo Cluster, and it was listed as the 1,062nd object in the Virgo Cluster Catalog (VCC). The galaxy has an estimated width of 83,000 light years (or 25,490 parsecs) across, or about 3/4 the size of the Milky Way. This size is based on an 2MASS K-band total angular diameter of 5.95 arcmin (or 357 arcsecs) and a mean redshift-independent distance of 48 million light years (or 14,720,000 parsecs).

NGC 4442 has a stellar mass of 162 billion M_{☉}, or 10^11.21. The galaxy is roughly 3/4th the stellar mass of the Milky Way. The galaxy has a large stellar population of red-giant branch stars (also known as RGB stars), with an average age of 3.92 billion years old, and an mean mass of 1.09 M_{☉}. The neutral atomic hydrogen in the galaxy has an mass of 54.9 million M_{☉}, and this gas is usually found in the outer regions of the galaxy such as the galactic halo.

NGC 4442 has a K-band luminosity of 550 billion L_{☉}, or 10^11.74 and therefore it is classified as a luminous infrared galaxy (also referred as LIRGs). The galaxy is one of the closest luminous infrared galaxies known, with a similar distance to other nearby luminous infrared galaxies such as Messier 77.

NGC 4442 has a star-formation rate of 10.7 M_{☉} per year, extremely high for gas-poor lenticular galaxies. Despite its high-star formation rate it is not classified as a starburst galaxy, and the galaxy's star-formation rate is comparable to other lenticular galaxies such as Messier 85. The total mass of the ionized atomic hydrogen in the galaxy, which mostly includes the star-forming regions is 109.6 million M_{☉}, or 10^8.04.

The galactic center of NGC 4442 shows a clear active galactic nucleus (also called AGNs), which is a region at the center of a galaxy that is extremely luminous and bright. The active galactic nucleus is powered by a massive supermassive black hole (also known as SMBHs) with a mass of 5.25 billion M_{☉} or roughly 1,200 times more massive than Sagittarius A*, which is the central black hole of the Milky Way.

NGC 4442 has a population of 219 globular clusters, however some of them are potentially not globular clusters and are candidates. The globular clusters have angular radii between 0.0103 and 0.1042 arcsecs, corresponding to a half-light radius ranging from 2.41 to 24.3 light years (or 0.74 to 7.44 parsecs).

== Supernova ==
One supernova has been identified in NGC 4442: SN 2021qvv, which had a peak magnitude of 13.8 in July 2021, and it was classified as a Type Ia supernova (abbreviated as SNIa). SN 2021qvv was discovered on June 24, 2021, by the Las Cumbres Observatory. The supernova had a maximum absolute luminosity of -16.42, equivalent to 316 million L_{☉} and was considered a underluminous supernova similar to other supernovae such as SN 2006mr. The supernova was formed by the collision of two white dwarfs with predicted masses of 0.85 M_{☉} and 1.1 M_{☉}, creating a super-Chandrasekhar white dwarf which collapsed and exploded.

== See also ==
- Messier 85, a lenticular galaxy that has a similar star-formation rate.
- Messier 77, another nearby luminous infrared galaxy.
- NGC 1277, another lenticular galaxy hosting a similar mass central black hole.
- NGC 1316, host of the underluminous supernova, SN 2006mr.
