= NGC 3811 =

Galaxy in the constellation Ursa Major

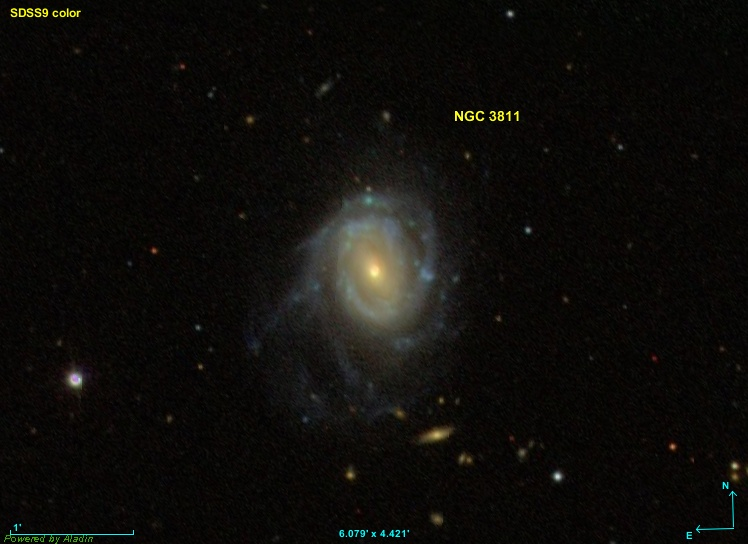
- NGC 3811 imaged by SDSS

Observation data (J2000 epoch)
- Constellation: Ursa Major
- Right ascension: 11^{h} 41^{m} 16.6161^{s}
- Declination: +47° 41′ 26.887″
- Redshift: 0.010294±0.000009
- Heliocentric radial velocity: 3,086±3 km/s
- Distance: 152.10 ± 12.53 Mly (46.633 ± 3.843 Mpc)
- Apparent magnitude (V): 12.9

Characteristics
- Type: SB(r)cd
- Size: ~110,600 ly (33.91 kpc) (estimated)
- Apparent size (V): 2.2′ × 1.7′

Other designations
- IRAS 11386+4758, UGC 6650, MCG +08-21-091, Mrk 185, PGC 36265, CGCG 242-074

NGC 3811 is a barred spiral galaxy in the constellation of Ursa Major. Its velocity with respect to the cosmic microwave background is 3,299±15 km/s, which corresponds to a Hubble distance of 158.7 ± 11.1 Mly (48.65 ± 3.41 Mpc). Additionally, 12 non-redshift measurements give a similar mean distance of 152.10 ± 12.53 Mly (46.633 ± 3.843 Mpc). It was discovered by German-British astronomer William Herschel on 9 February 1788.

NGC 3811 is a starburst galaxy. It is also a galaxy whose nucleus shines in the ultraviolet range, and is thus listed in the Markarian catalogue as Mrk 185.

== Supernovae ==
Two supernovae have been observed in NGC 3811:

- SN 1969C (Type I, mag. 12) was discovered by Italian astronomer Leonida Rosino on 9 February 1969, and independently by Jankovits on 11 February 1969.
- SN 1971K (type unknown, mag. 16.1) was discovered by Russian amateur astronomer Piotr Grigor'evich Kulikovsky on 12 June 1971.

== See also ==
- List of NGC objects (3001–4000)
