= NGC 977 =

Galaxy in the constellation Cetus

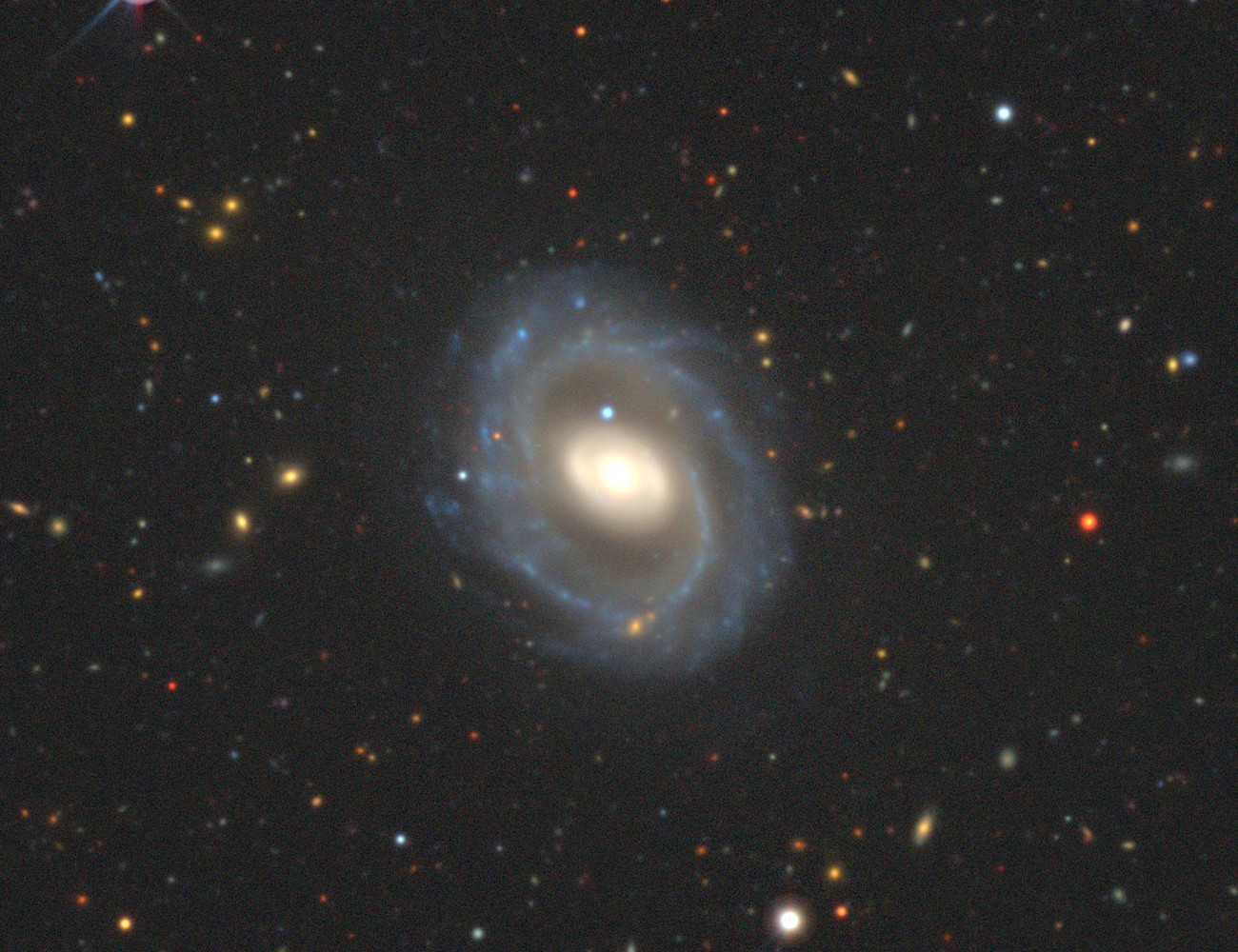
- NGC 977 imaged by Legacy Surveys

Observation data (J2000 epoch)
- Constellation: Cetus
- Right ascension: 02^{h} 33^{m} 03.4241^{s}
- Declination: −10° 45′ 35.544″
- Redshift: 0.015274±0.0000370
- Heliocentric radial velocity: 4,579±11 km/s
- Distance: 217.00 ± 17.56 Mly (66.533 ± 5.384 Mpc)
- Group or cluster: NGC 945 group (LGG 63)
- Apparent magnitude (V): 13.5

Characteristics
- Type: (R')SAB(r)a
- Size: ~126,300 ly (38.71 kpc) (estimated)
- Apparent size (V): 1.9′ × 1.6′

Other designations
- 2MASX J02330342-1045361, MCG -02-07-031, PGC 9713

NGC 977 is an intermediate spiral galaxy in the constellation of Cetus. Its velocity with respect to the cosmic microwave background is 4,356±19 km/s, which corresponds to a Hubble distance of 209.6 ± 14.7 Mly (64.25 ± 4.51 Mpc). Additionally, six non-redshift measurements give a similar mean distance of 217.00 ± 17.56 Mly (66.533 ± 5.384 Mpc). It was discovered by German-British astronomer William Herschel on 28 November 1785.

NGC 977 is a Seyfert II galaxy, i.e. it has a quasar-like nucleus with very high surface brightnesses whose spectra reveal strong, high-ionisation emission lines, but unlike quasars, the host galaxy is clearly detectable.

== NGC 945 group ==
NGC 977 is a member of the NGC 945 group (also known as LGG 63), which contains at least seven galaxies. The other members of the group are NGC 945, NGC 948, NGC 950, MCG -02-07-020, MCG -02-07-032, and MCG -02-07-033.

== Supernova ==
One supernova has been observed in NGC 977:

- SN 1976J (type unknown, mag. 15.5) was discovered by Italian astronomer Leonida Rosino on 15 December 1976. Although it was never officially classified, its light curve suggested that it was a Type I supernova.

== See also ==
- List of NGC objects (1–1000)
