= NGC 950 =

Galaxy in the constellation Cetus

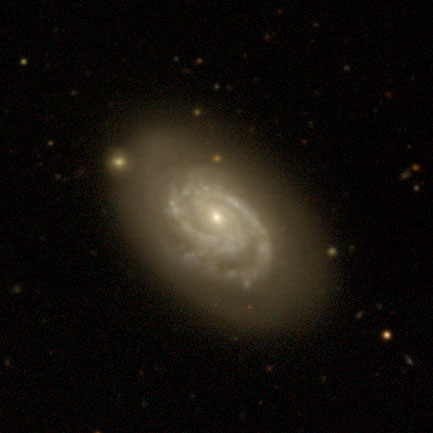
- DECam image of NGC 950

Observation data (J2000 epoch)
- Constellation: Cetus
- Right ascension: 02^{h} 29^{m} 11.777^{s}
- Declination: −11° 01′ 28.78″
- Redshift: 0.015775
- Heliocentric radial velocity: 4692 km/s
- Distance: 204.5 Mly (62.71 Mpc)
- Apparent magnitude (B): 14.48

Characteristics
- Type: SB(rs)b:

Other designations
- MCG -02-07-021, PGC 9461

NGC 950 is a barred spiral galaxy in the constellation Cetus. It is approximately 205 million light-years away from the Solar System and has a diameter of about 85,000 light-years. The object was discovered in 1886 by American astronomer and mathematician Ormond Stone.

NGC 950 is part of a galaxy group known as NGC 945 Group or LGG 63. It has at least 7 members, which are NGC 950, NGC 945, NGC 948, NGC 977, MCG 2-7-32, MCG 2-7-20 and MCG 3-7-33.

== See also ==
- List of NGC objects (1–1000)
