= NGC 945 =

Galaxy in the constellation Cetus

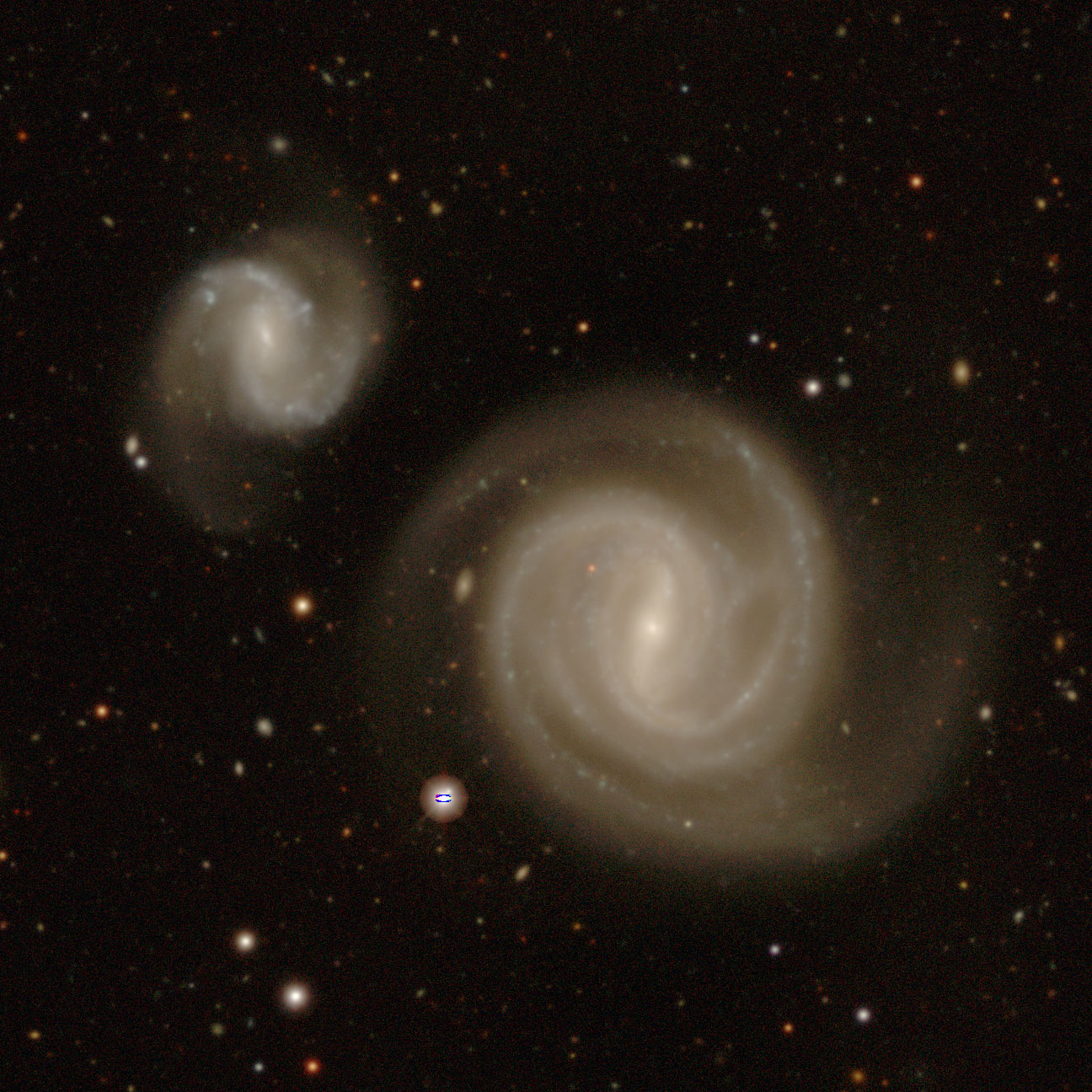
- NGC 945 (right) and NGC 948 (left)

Observation data (J2000 epoch)
- Right ascension: 02h 28m 36s
- Declination: -10° 32′ 20″
- Apparent magnitude (B): 1202h 28m 36s
- Surface brightness: 23.01 mag/arcsec2

Other designations
- IRAS 02261-1045, 2MASX J02283732-1032211, MCG -02-07-013, PGC 009426

NGC 945 is a barred spiral galaxy in the constellation Cetus, located south of the celestial equator. It is estimated to be 200 million light-years from the Milky Way, and about 135,000 light-years in diameter. The object was discovered by astronomer William Herschel on November 28, 1785. It is near NGC 948, with which it forms a gravitationally bound pair of galaxies. In the same area of the sky there are the galaxies NGC 942, NGC 943, NGC 950, and IC 230.

== NGC 948 ==
NGC 948 is a spiral galaxy located extremely close to NGC 945. Its speed relative to the cosmic microwave background is 4,259 ± 17 km/s, which corresponds to a Hubble distance of 62.8 ± 4.4 Mpc (~205 million ly). NGC 948 was discovered by American astronomer Lewis Swift in 1886. The luminosity class of NGC 948 is III and it has a broad HI line. With a surface brightness equal to 14.17 mag/am2, NGC 948 is classified as a low surface brightness galaxy (LSB).

== Supernovae ==
Two supernovae have been observed in NGC 945:

- SN 1998dt (Type Ib, mag. 17.7) was discovered by T. Shefler of the University of California at Berkeley on 1 September 1998, as part of the LOSS (Lick Observatory Supernova Search) program at the Lick observatory.
- SN 2020obd (Type II, mag. 17.3) was discovered by ATLAS on 6 July 2020.

== NGC 945 group ==
NGC 945 is the brightest galaxy in a group of at least 7 members that bears its name. The other six galaxies in the NGC 945 group are NGC 948, NGC 950, NGC 977, MCG -2-7-20, MCG -2-7-32 and MCG -2-7-337.

== See also ==
- Interacting galaxy
- List of NGC objects (1–1000)
- Lists of galaxies
