= NGC 4394 =

Galaxy in the constellation Coma Berenices

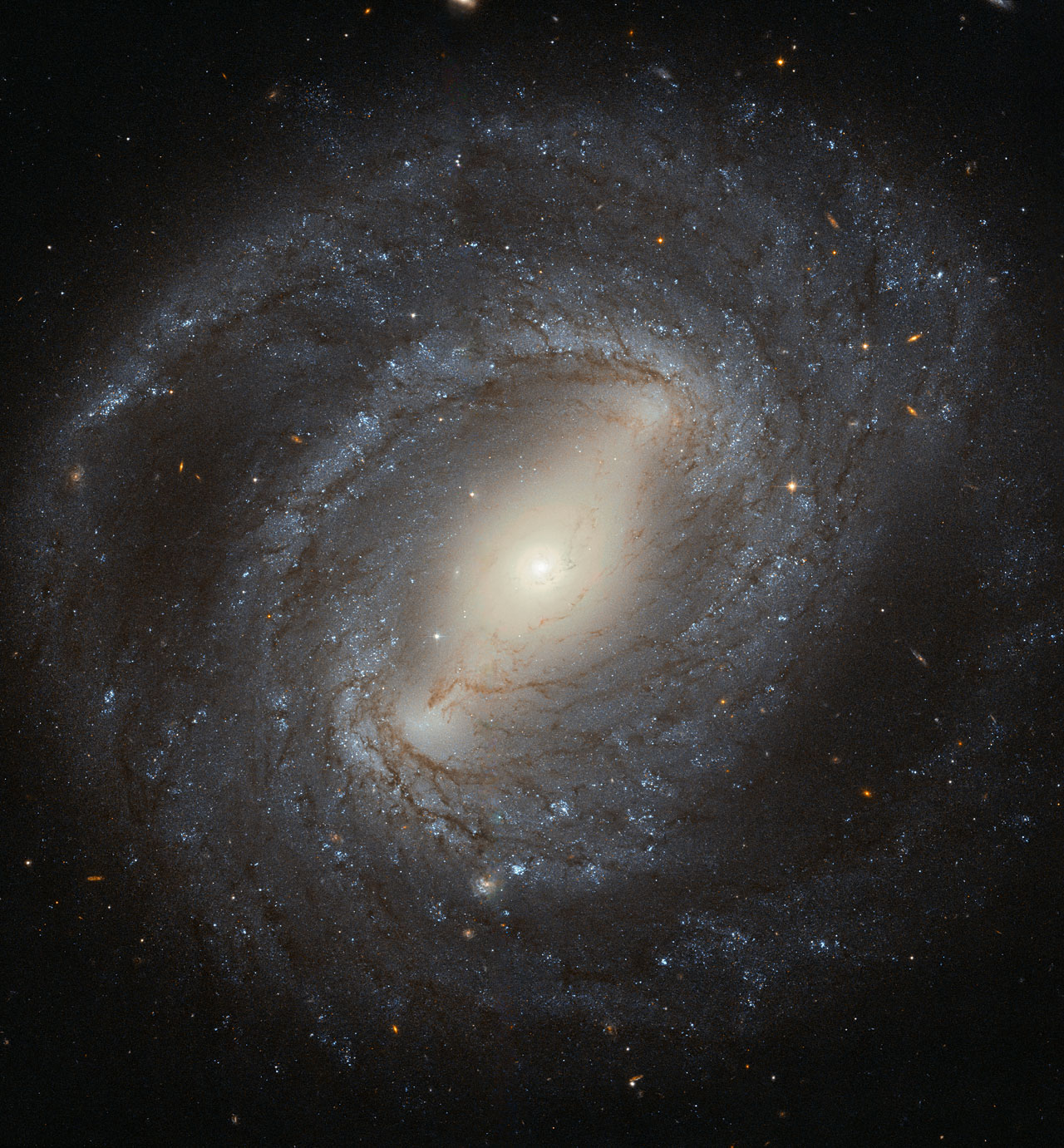
- NGC 4394 taken by Hubble Space Telescope.

Observation data (J2000 epoch)
- Constellation: Coma Berenices
- Right ascension: 12^{h} 25^{m} 55.624^{s}
- Declination: +18° 12′ 50.13″
- Redshift: 0.003075
- Heliocentric radial velocity: 922±4 km/s
- Galactocentric velocity: 886±4 km/s
- Distance: 55±2.9 Mly (12.1±0.9 Mpc)
- Group or cluster: Virgo Cluster
- Apparent magnitude (V): 10.9
- Apparent magnitude (B): 11.9
- Absolute magnitude (V): -20.49

Characteristics
- Type: SBb / (R)SB(r)b
- Size: 41.2×38.8 kly (12.7×11.3 kpc)
- Apparent size (V): 3.6′×3.2′

Other designations
- NGC 4394, UGC 7523, PGC 40614, MCG+03-32-035

NGC 4394 is a SBb barred spiral galaxy in the constellation Coma Berenices and is situated about 39.5 million light-years (12.1 megaparsecs) from Earth. It was discovered on 14 March 1784 by the German–British astronomer William Herschel. It is a presumed companion to the lenticular galaxy M85 / NGC 4382, which lies 8 arc minutes away. It is also a member of the Virgo Cluster.

== Gallery ==
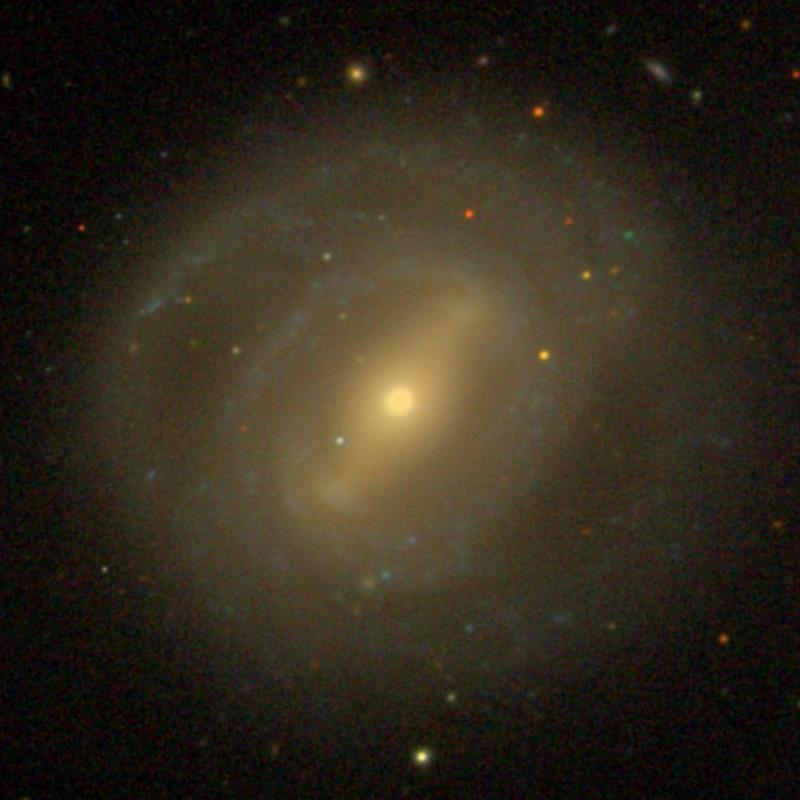
SDSS

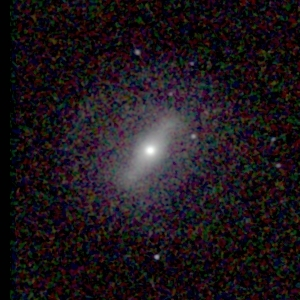
2MASS

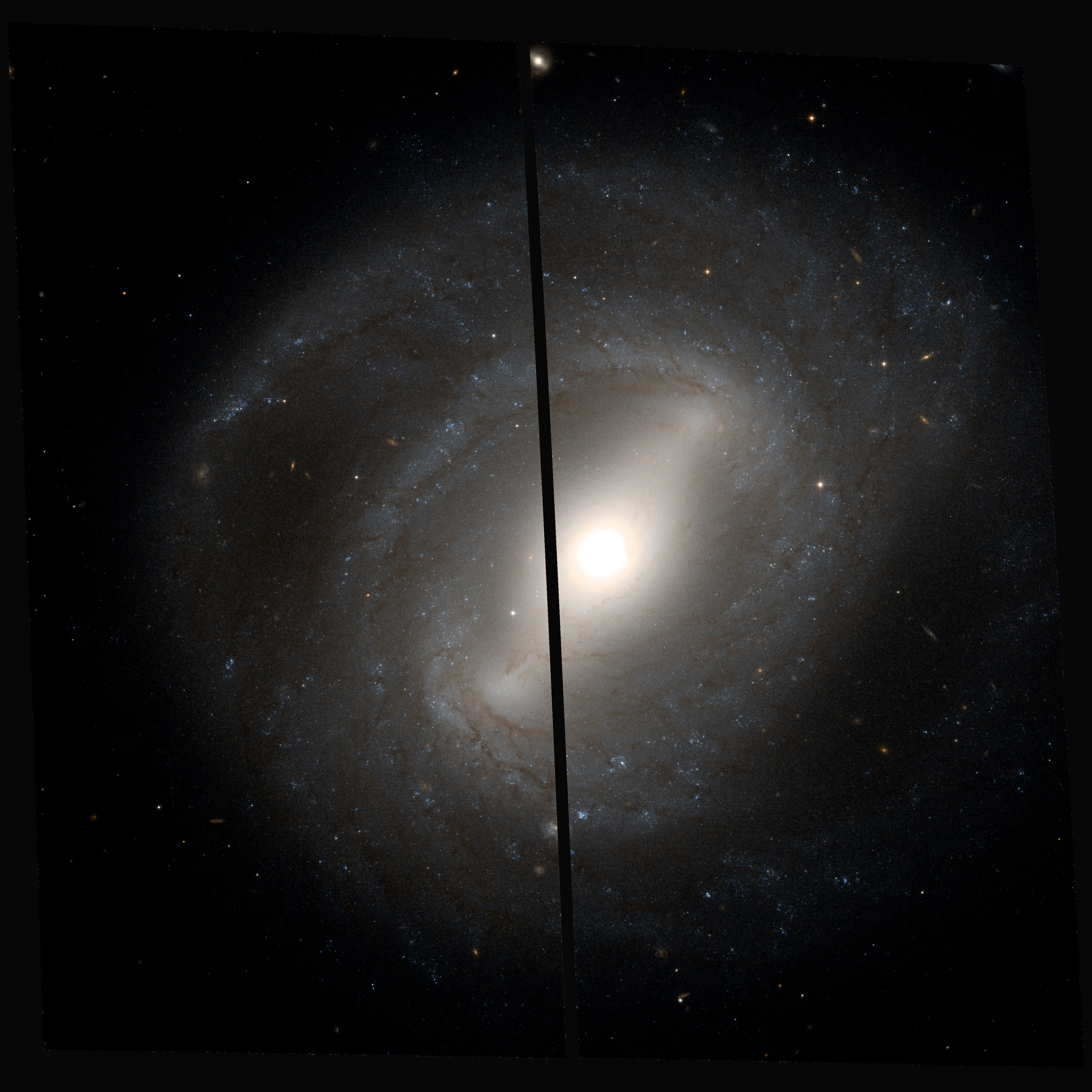
Hubble Space Telescope

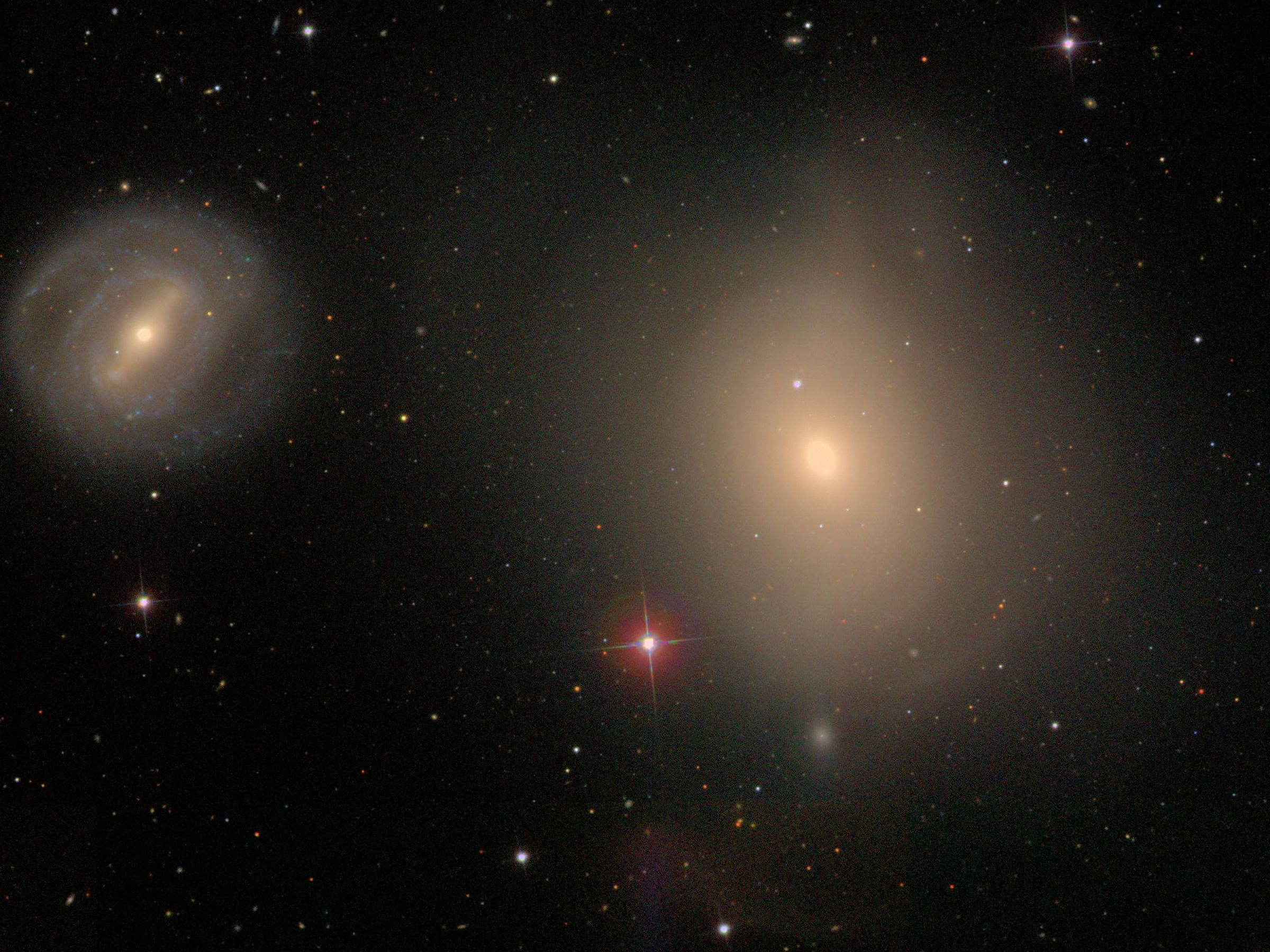
NGC 4394 (left) with the lenticular galaxy M85 (right)
