= NGC 4845 =

Spiral galaxy in the constellation Virgo

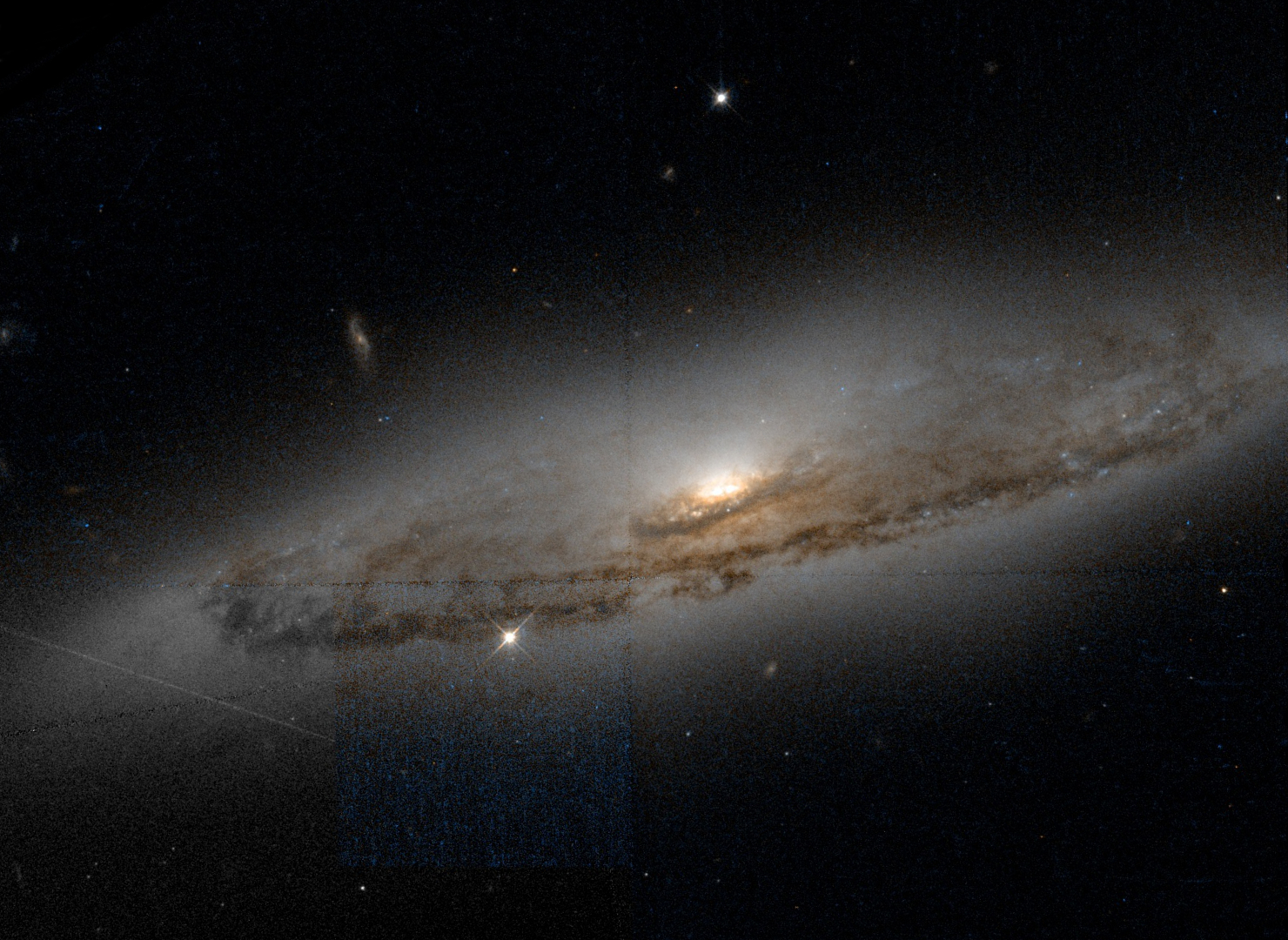
- NGC 4845 as seen by HST

Observation data (J2000 epoch)
- Constellation: Virgo
- Right ascension: 12^{h} 58^{m} 01.2^{s}
- Declination: 1° 34′ 33″
- Redshift: z=0.004110 (1232 km/s)
- Distance: 65 Mly
- Apparent magnitude (V): 11.2

Characteristics
- Type: Sab
- Apparent size (V): 4′.9 × 1′.3

Other designations
- UGC 08087, 2MASX J12580124+0134320, NGC 4910, PGC 44392

NGC 4845 (also known as NGC 4910) is a spiral galaxy located in the constellation Virgo around 65 million light years away. The galaxy was originally discovered by William Herschel in 1786. It is a member of the NGC 4753 Group of galaxies, which is a member of the Virgo II Groups, a series of galaxies and galaxy clusters strung out from the southern edge of the Virgo Supercluster.

The galaxy has a supermassive black hole, called IGR J12580+0134, at its center with a mass of 300,000$\begin{smallmatrix}M_\odot\end{smallmatrix}$. In 2013, the ESA observed the black hole absorbing matter from a nearby, low-mass object; possibly a brown dwarf star. The observed X-ray flare was caught by the ESA's INTEGRAL telescope.

== Gallery ==
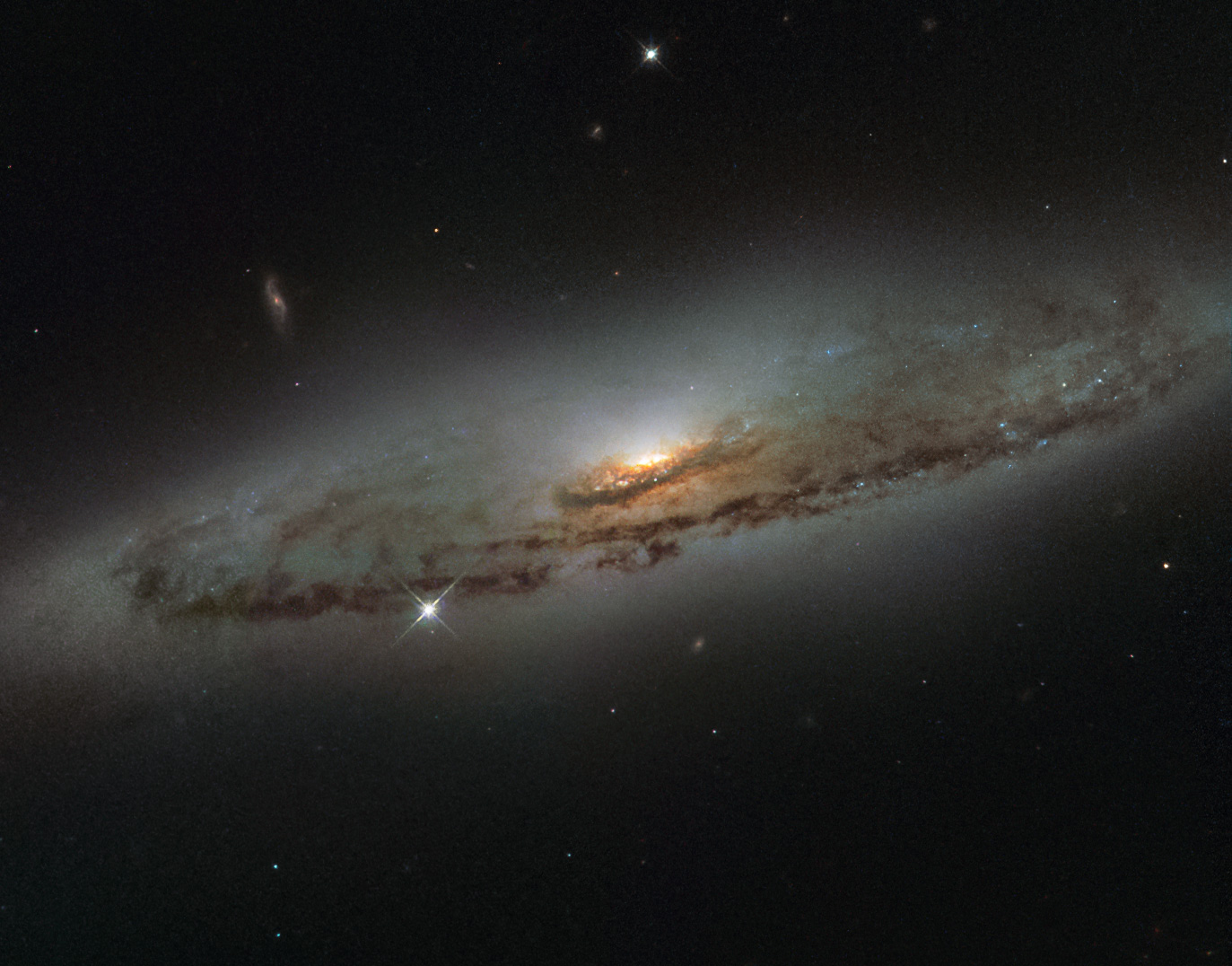
NGC 4845's glowing centre hosts a gigantic version of a black hole.
