= Messier 88 =

Galaxy in the constellation Coma Berenices

- Spiral galaxy Messier 88 imaged by University of Arizona Skycenter

Observation data (J2000 epoch)
- Constellation: Coma Berenices
- Right ascension: 12^{h} 31^{m} 59.1691^{s}
- Declination: +14° 25′ 12.974″
- Redshift: 0.007619±0.00000500
- Heliocentric radial velocity: 2,284±1 km/s
- Distance: 58.66 ± 2.25 Mly (17.984 ± 0.690 Mpc)
- Group or cluster: Virgo Cluster
- Apparent magnitude (V): 9.6

Characteristics
- Type: SA(rs)b, H_{II} Sy2
- Number of stars: 400 billion
- Size: 131,250 ly (40.26 kpc) (estimated)
- Apparent size (V): 6.9′ × 3.7′

Other designations
- VCC 1401, IRAS 12294+1441, 2MASX J12315921+1425134, NGC 4501, UGC 7675, MCG +03-32-059, PGC 41517, CGCG 099-076

Messier 88 (also known as M88 or NGC 4501) is an unbarred spiral galaxy about 50 to 60 million light-years away from Earth in the constellation Coma Berenices. It was discovered by Charles Messier in 1781.

== Properties ==
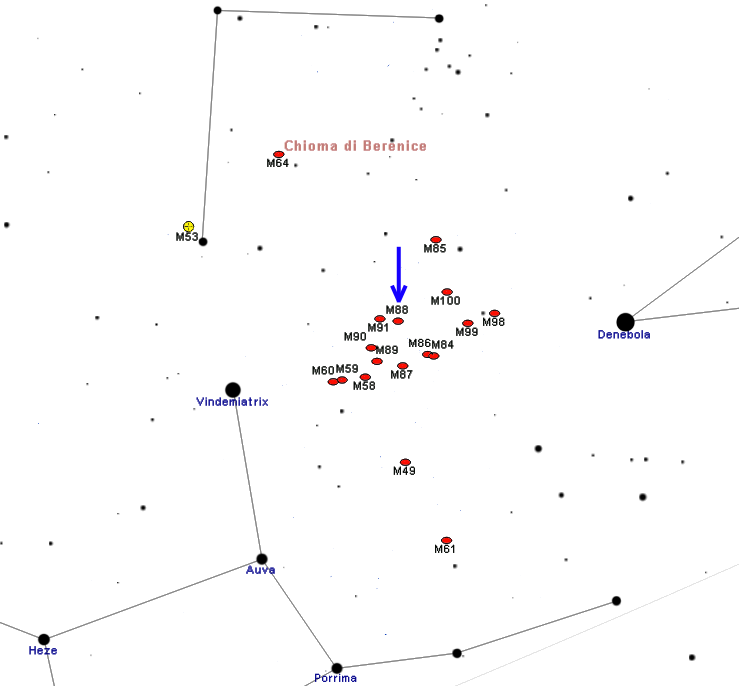
Location of M88

M88 is one of the fifteen Messier objects that belong to the nearby Virgo Cluster of galaxies. It is galaxy number 1401 in the Virgo Cluster Catalogue (VCC) of 2096 galaxies that are candidate members of the cluster. M88 appears to be on or ending a highly elliptical orbit, currently on an approximate or direct course toward the cluster center, which is occupied by the giant elliptical galaxy M87. It is currently 0.3 to 0.48 million parsecs from the center and will come closest to the core in about 200 to 300 million years. Its motion through the intergalactic medium of its cluster is creating, as expected, ram pressure that is stripping away the outer region of neutral hydrogen. To date, this has been detected along the western, leading edge of the galaxy.

This galaxy is inclined to the line of sight by 64°. It is classified as an Sbc spiral, a status between Sb (medium-wound) and Sc (loosely wound) spiral arms. The spiralling arms are very regular and can be followed down to the galactic core. The maximum rotation velocity of the gas is 241.6 ± 4.5 km/s.

M88 is classified as a type 2 Seyfert galaxy, which means it produces narrow spectral line emission from highly ionized gas in the nucleus. In the core region there is a central condensation with a 230 parsec diameter, which has two concentration peaks. This condensation is being fed by inflow from the spiral arms. The supermassive black hole at the core of this galaxy has 10^{7.9} solar masses, or about 80 million solar masses (M_{☉}).

== Supernova ==
One supernova has been observed in M88:

- SN 1999cl (Type Ia, mag. 16.4) was discovered by the Lick Observatory Supernova Search (LOSS) on 29 May 1999.

== See also ==
- List of Messier objects
- Messier 58
