= Messier 85 =

Galaxy in the constellation Coma Berenices

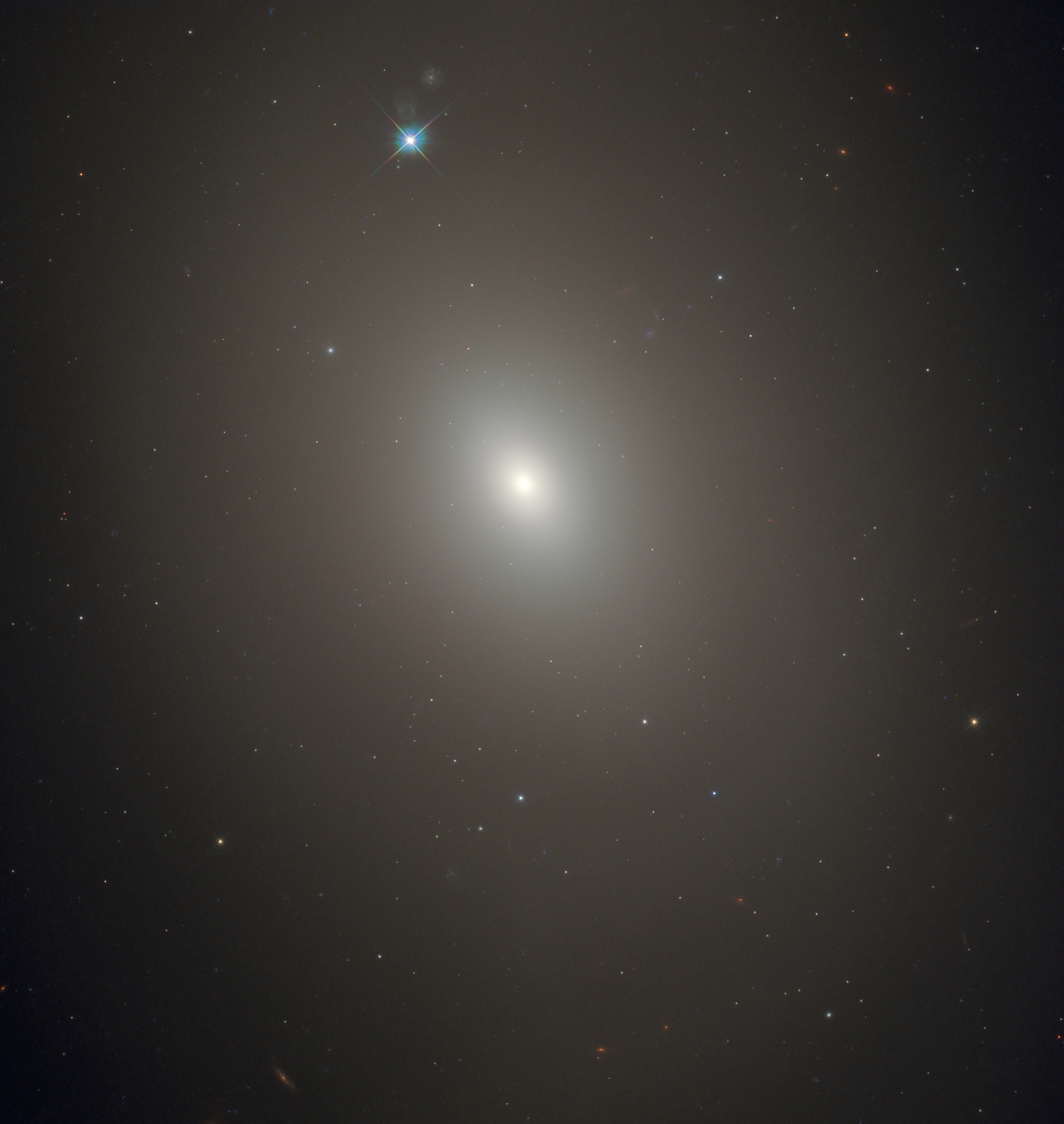
- Galaxy Messier 85 by Hubble Space Telescope

Observation data (J2000 epoch)
- Constellation: Coma Berenices
- Right ascension: 12^{h} 25^{m} 24.0528^{s}
- Declination: +18° 11′ 27.888″
- Redshift: 729 ± 2 km/s
- Distance: 60 ± 4 Mly (18.5 ± 1.2 Mpc)
- Apparent magnitude (V): 9.1

Characteristics
- Type: SA(s)0^{+} pec/E_{2}
- Size: 36.99 kiloparsecs (120,600 light-years) (diameter; 2MASS total aperture)
- Apparent size (V): 7′.1 × 5′.5

Other designations
- NGC 4382, UGC 7508, PGC 40515

Messier 85 (also known as M85 or NGC 4382 or PGC 40515 or ISD 0135852) is a lenticular galaxy, or elliptical galaxy for other authors, in the constellation Coma Berenices. It is 60 million light-years away, and has a diameter of about 36.99 kiloparsecs (120,600 light-years) across.

Pierre Méchain discovered M85 in 1781. It is within the outskirts of the Virgo Cluster, and is relatively isolated.

== Properties ==
M85 is extremely poor in neutral hydrogen and has a very complex outer structure with shells and ripples that are thought to have been caused by a merger with another galaxy that took place between 4 and 7 billion years ago, as well as a relatively young (<3 billion years old) stellar population on its centermost region, some of it in a ring, that may have been created by a late starburst. Like other massive, early-type galaxies, it has different populations of globular clusters. Aside from the typical "red" and "blue" populations, there is also a population with intermediate colors and an even redder population. It is likely transitioning from being a lenticular galaxy into an elliptical galaxy.

While indirect methods imply that Messier 85 should contain a central supermassive black hole of around 100 million solar masses, velocity dispersion observations imply that the galaxy may entirely lack a central massive black hole.

M85 is interacting with the nearby spiral galaxy NGC 4394, and a small elliptical galaxy called MCG 3-32-38.

Compared to other early-type galaxies, M85 emits a relatively smaller proportion of X-rays.

== Novae and Supernovae ==
Two supernovae and one luminous red nova have been observed in M85:

- SN 1960R (Type Ia, mag. 13.5), was discovered by Howard S. Gates on 20 December 1960, and independently discovered by Leonida Rosino on 18 January 1961.
- M85 OT2006-1 was discovered on the outskirts of the galaxy, by the Lick Observatory Supernova Search (LOSS) on 7 January 2006. It was classified as a luminous red nova, the first to be identified as such.
- SN 2020nlb (Type Ia, mag. 17.436) was discovered by the ATLAS telescope in Hawaii on 25 June 2020. This supernova got as bright as magnitude 12.

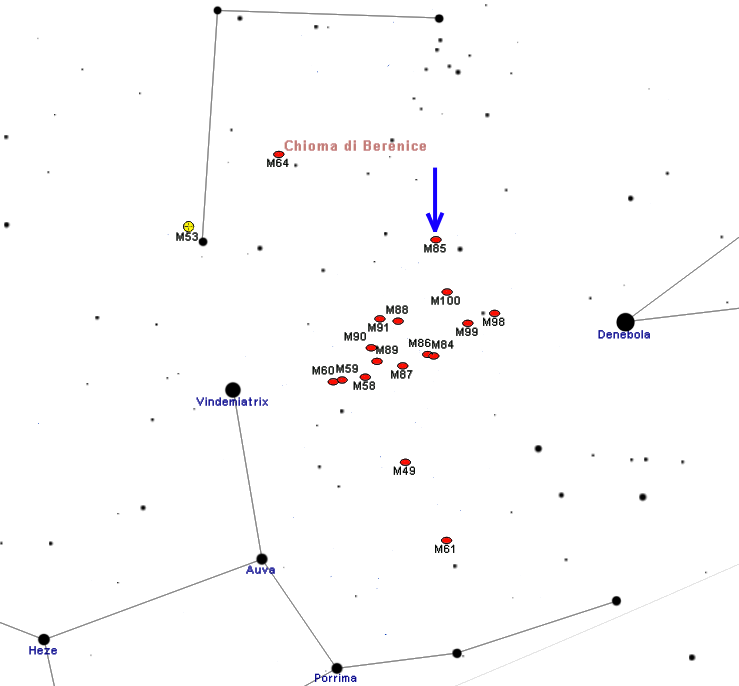
Location of M85

== See also ==
- List of Messier objects
