= NGC 4123 =

Galaxy in the constellation Virgo

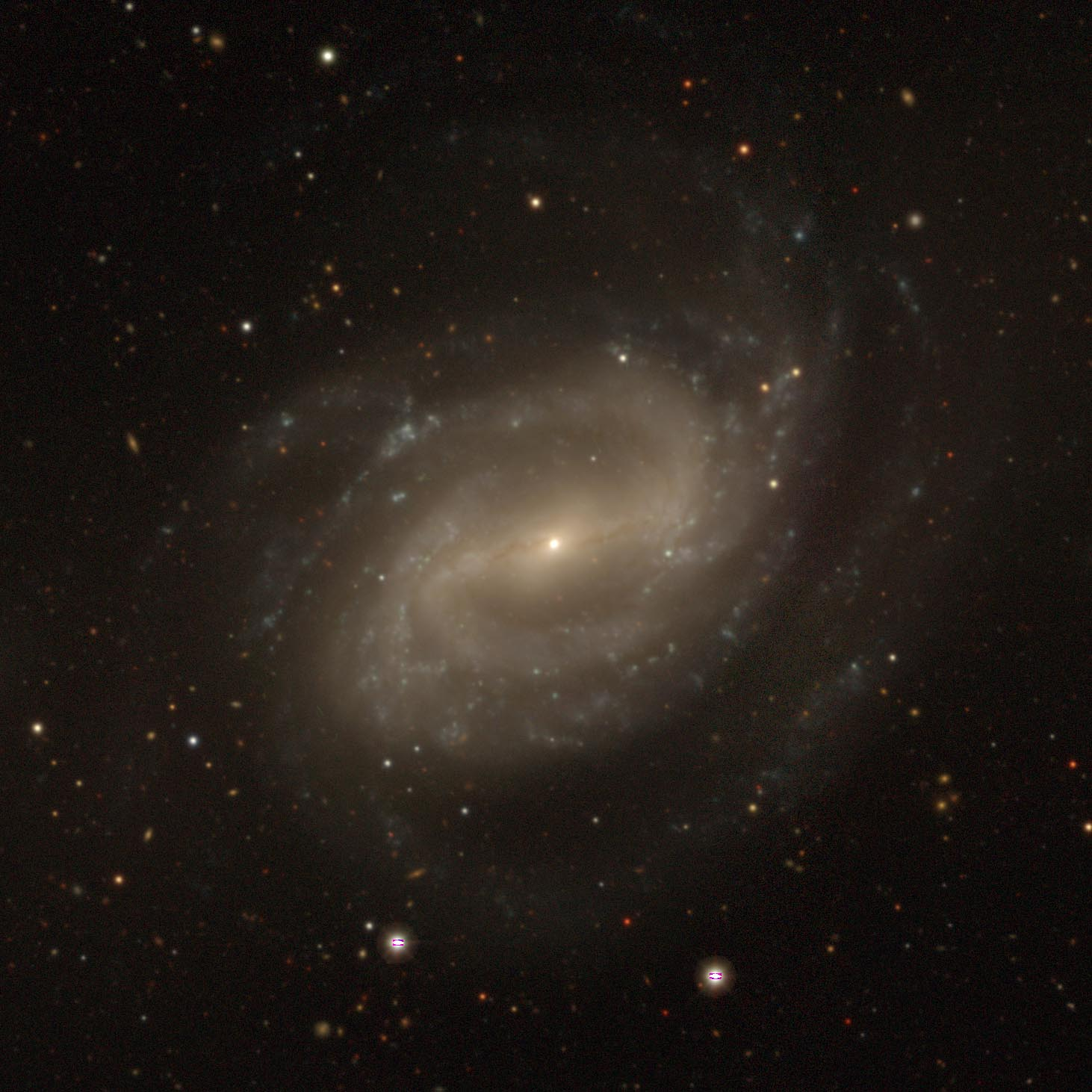
- NGC 4123 with Legacy Surveys DR10

Observation data (J2000 epoch)
- Right ascension: 12^{h} 08^{m} 11.119^{s}
- Declination: +02° 52′ 41.78″
- Redshift: 0.00429±0.00002
- Heliocentric radial velocity: 1,326 km/s
- Distance: 75 ± 14 Mly (22.9 ± 4.2 Mpc)
- Apparent magnitude (V): 11.4
- Apparent magnitude (B): 13.10

Characteristics
- Type: SBx(rs)ab
- Mass/Light ratio: 2.25 M_{☉}/L_{☉}
- Apparent size (V): 1.900′ × 0.646′ (NIR)

Other designations
- NGC 4123, UGC 7116, PGC 38531, LEDA 38531, Mrk 1466

NGC 4123 is a modest-sized, strongly-barred spiral galaxy located 75 million light-years away in the equatorial constellation of Virgo. It was discovered February 25, 1784 by William Herschel. This is a member of the Virgo Cluster, and it belongs to a group of three galaxies. A companion galaxy, NGC 4116, lies at an angular separation of 14′ to the southwest. There is no indication of an interaction between the two galaxies. The third member of the group is NGC 4179.

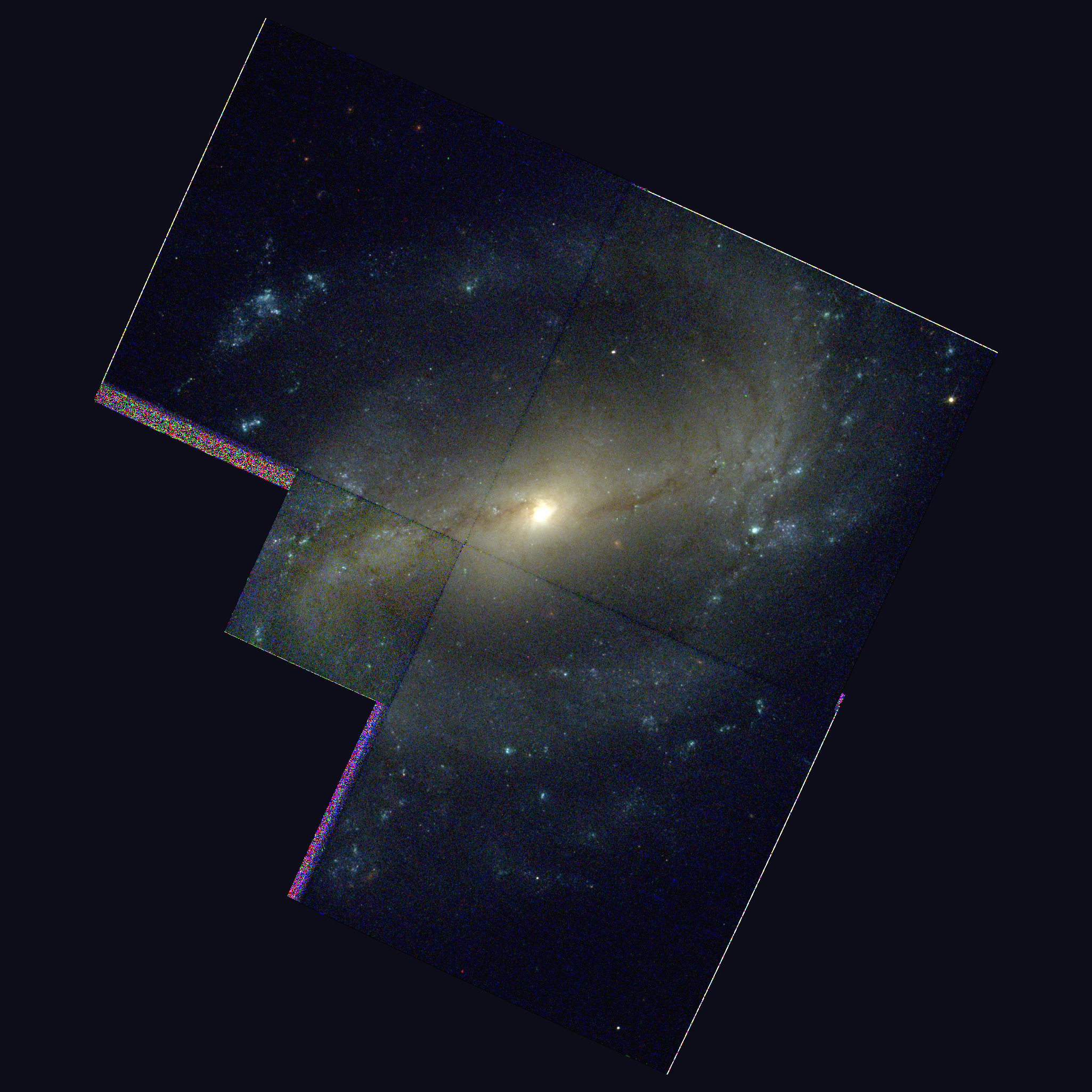
Hubble Space Telescope image of NGC 4123

The morphological classification of NGC 4123 is SBx(rs)ab, which indicates this is a spiral galaxy with a central X-shaped bar (SBx) encircled by an incomplete ring structure (rs) and moderate to tightly wound spiral arms (ab). The plane of the galaxy is inclined at an angle of 46.9° to the line of sight from the Earth. It lacks a large spheroidal bulge at the core, showing only a luminous point-like source. Blue knots in the outer spiral arms indicate that star formation is ongoing. The galaxy has a stellar mass of 1.95×10^{10} M_{☉} with a star formation rate of 3.429±3.281 M_{☉}·yr^{−1}. The atomic gas in the galaxy has a mass of 1.06×10^{10} M_{☉}.

Radio emission has been detected from an HII nucleus, which is consistent with it having a weak active galactic nucleus. If there is a supermassive black hole at the core, it has an estimated mass of 10^{7} M_{☉}.
