= NGC 4753 =

Galaxy in the constellation Virgo

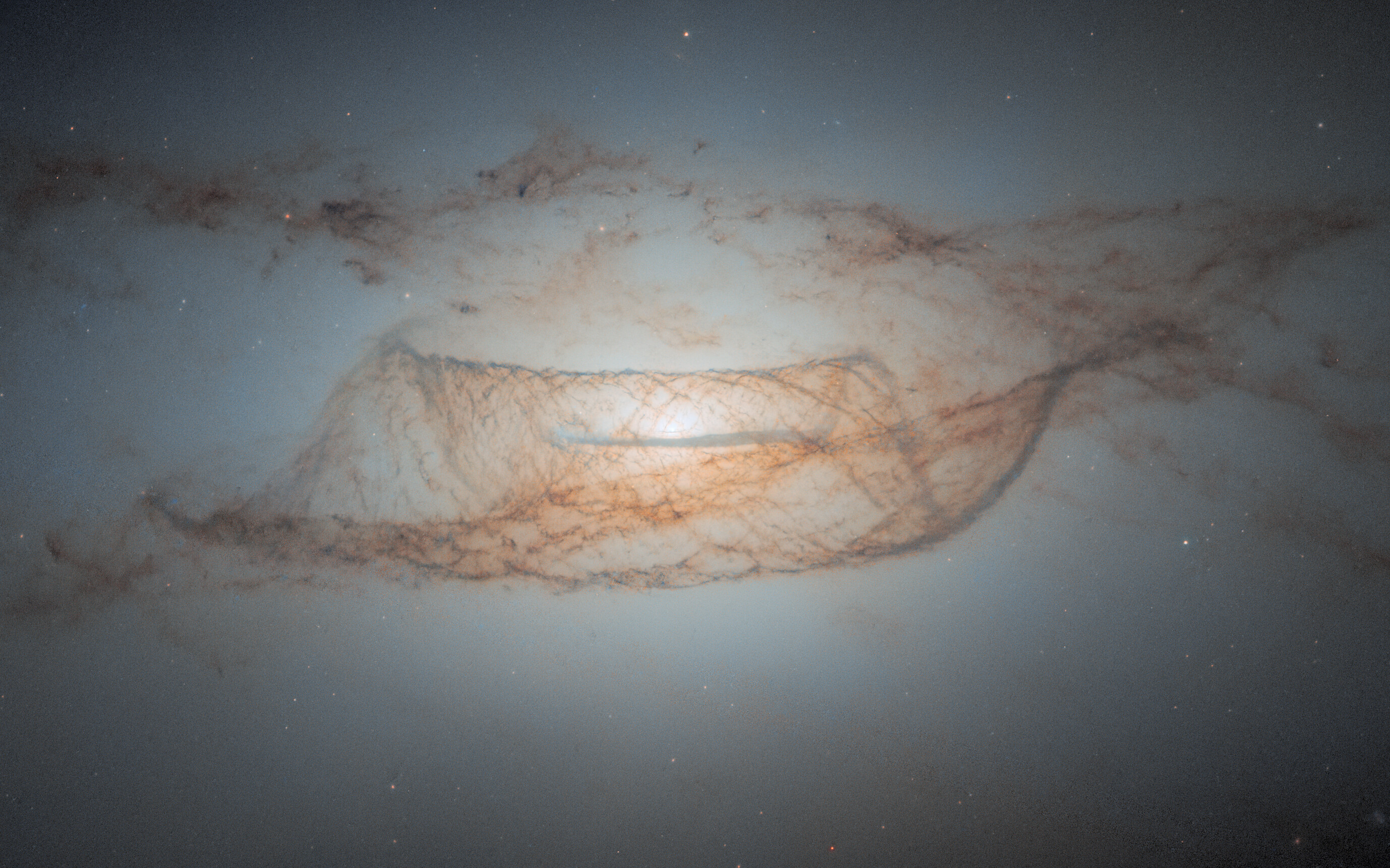
- NGC 4753 imaged by the HST. Note the distinct dust lanes surrounding the nucleus.

Observation data (J2000 epoch)
- Constellation: Virgo
- Right ascension: 12^{h} 52^{m} 22.0682^{s}
- Declination: −01° 11′ 58.597″
- Redshift: 0.003879
- Heliocentric radial velocity: 1163 ± 5 km/s
- Distance: 72.0 ± 5.2 Mly (22.08 ± 1.59 Mpc)
- Group or cluster: NGC 4753 Group
- Apparent magnitude (V): 10.85

Characteristics
- Type: S0 pec
- Size: ~128,000 ly (39.24 kpc) (estimated)
- Apparent size (V): 6.0 x 2.8

Other designations
- IRAS 12498-0055, UGC 8009, MCG +00-33-016, PGC 43671, CGCG 015-029

NGC 4753, also known as the Dust Devil Galaxy, is a lenticular galaxy located about 60 million light-years away in the constellation of Virgo. NGC 4753 was discovered by astronomer William Herschel on February 22, 1784. It is notable for having distinct dust lanes that surround its nucleus. It is a member of the NGC 4753 Group of galaxies, which is a member of the Virgo II Groups, a series of galaxies and galaxy clusters strung out from the southern edge of the Virgo Supercluster.

== Physical characteristics ==
The distribution of dust in NGC 4753 lies in an inclined disk wrapped several times around the nucleus. The material in the disk may have been accreted from the merger of a gas rich dwarf galaxy. Over several orbital periods, the accreted material eventually smeared out into a disk. Differential precession that occurred after the accretion event caused the disk to twist. Eventually, the disk settled into a fixed orientation with respect to the galaxy. The age of the disk is estimated to be around half a billion to a billion years.

Another explanation suggests that the dust in NGC 4753 originated from red giant stars in the galaxy.

=== Dark matter ===
Analysis of the twisted disk in NGC 4753 by Steiman-Cameron et al. revealed that most of the mass in the galaxy lies in a slightly flattened spherical halo of dark matter.

== Globular clusters ==
NGC 4753 has an estimated population of 1070 ± 120 globular clusters.

== Supernovae ==
Two supernovae have been observed in NGC 4753:

- SN 1965I (type unknown, mag. 13.5) was discovered by Leonida Rosino on 18 June 1965.
- SN 1983G (Type Ia, mag. 13) was co-discovered by Kiyomi Okazaki and Robert Evans on 4 April 1983.

== Group membership ==
NGC 4753 is a member of its own galaxy group, known as the NGC 4753 Group. The NGC 4753 Group is located near the southern edge of the Virgo Cluster. The group, along with other groups of galaxies form part of a filament that extends off from the southern border of the Virgo Cluster that is called the Virgo II Groups.

== Image gallery ==
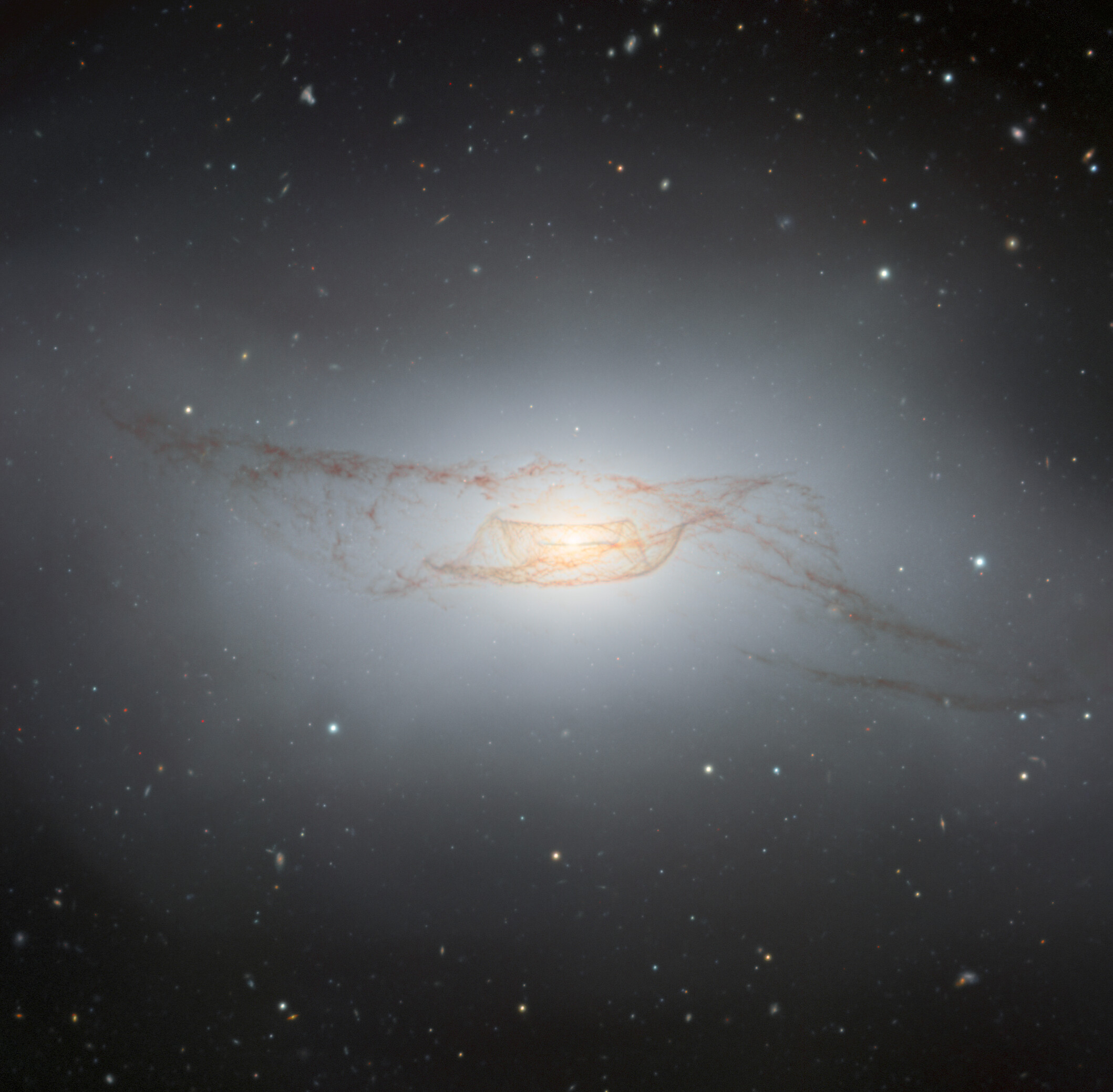
NGC 4753 imaged by the Gemini South Telescope

== See also ==
- List of NGC objects (4001–5000)
- Centaurus A
