= NGC 4535 =

Spiral galaxy in the constellation Virgo

- NGC 4535 imaged by the Vera C. Rubin Observatory

Observation data (J2000 epoch)
- Constellation: Virgo
- Right ascension: 12^{h} 34^{m} 20.310^{s}
- Declination: +08° 11′ 51.94″
- Redshift: 0.006551±0.000002
- Heliocentric radial velocity: +1,962 km/s
- Distance: 54.14 ± 1.76 Mly (16.60 ± 0.54 Mpc)
- Group or cluster: Virgo Cluster
- Apparent magnitude (B): 10.73
- Absolute magnitude (V): –21.42 ± 0.09

Characteristics
- Type: SAB(s)c
- Size: ~115,300 ly (35.34 kpc) (estimated)
- Apparent size (V): 11.8′ × 11.0′

Other designations
- The Lost Galaxy, HOLM 420A, IRAS 12318+0828, UGC 7727, MCG +01-32-104, PGC 41812, CGCG 042-159

NGC 4535 is a barred spiral galaxy located some 54 million light years from Earth in the constellation Virgo. It was discovered by German-British astronomer William Herschel on 28 December 1785. Due to its low surface brightness, it has been called "The Lost Galaxy."

NGC 4535 and NGC 4535A are listed together as Holm 420 in Erik Holmberg's A Study of Double and Multiple Galaxies Together with Inquiries into some General Metagalactic Problems, published in 1937. However, at a distance of about 369.6 Mly (113.33 Mpc), NGC 4535A is about seven times further away, so the grouping is purely an optical alignment.

NGC 4535 is a member of the Virgo Cluster of galaxies and is located 4.3° from Messier 87. The galactic plane of NGC 4535 is inclined by an angle of 43° to the line of sight from the Earth. The morphological classification of NGC 4535 in the De Vaucouleurs system is SAB(s)c, which indicates a bar structure across the core (SAB), no ring (s), and loosely wound spiral arms (c). The inner part of the galaxy has two spiral arms, which branch into multiple arms further away. The small nucleus is of type HII, meaning the spectrum resembles that of an H II region.

In 1999, the Hubble Space Telescope observed Cepheid variable stars in NGC 4535. The period-luminosity relationship for these objects yielded a distance modulus of 31.02 ± 0.26 magnitude. This corresponded to a physical distance estimate of 52.2 ± 6.2 Mly (16.0 ± 1.9) Mpc, which was consistent with distance estimates for other members of the Virgo Cluster.

== Gallery ==
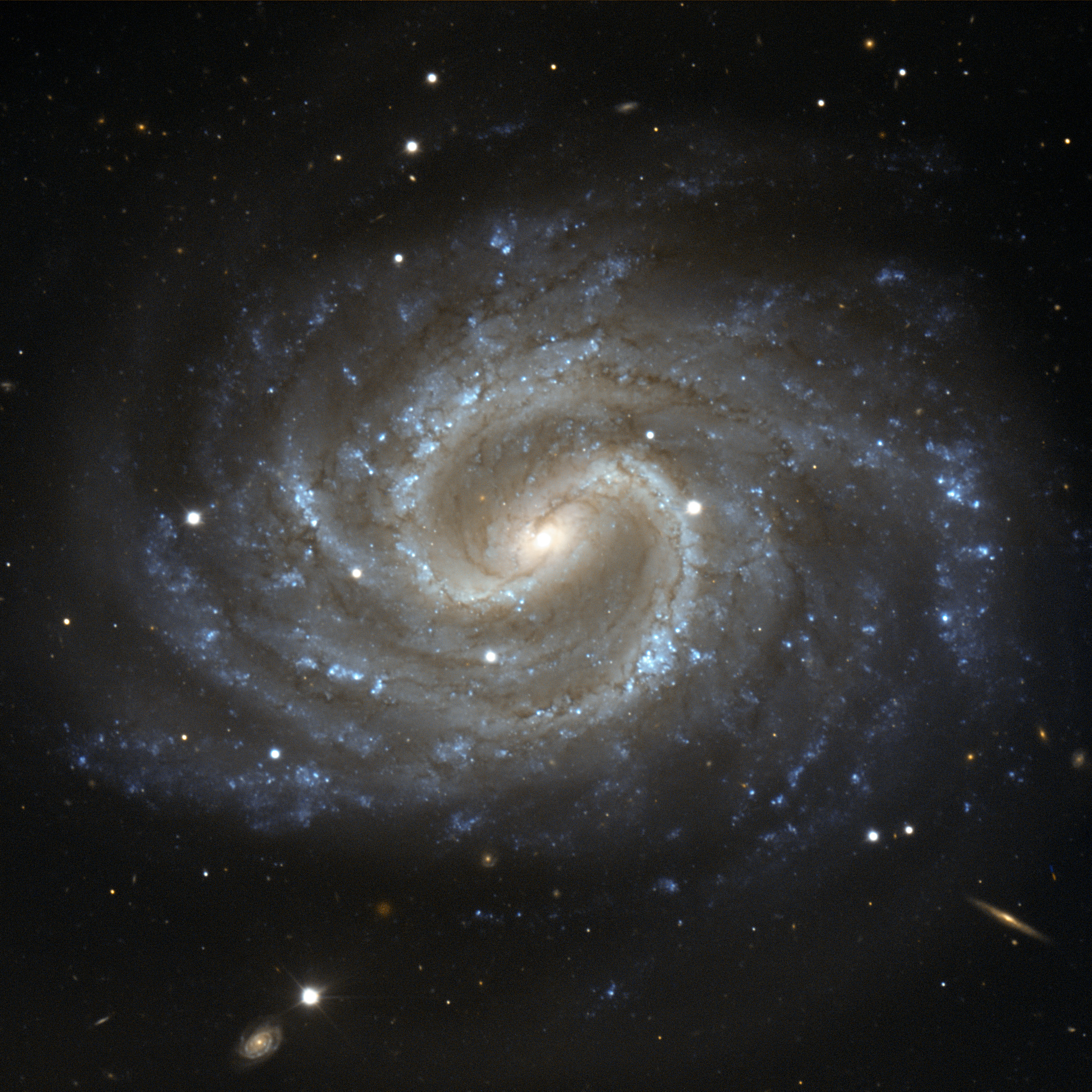
NGC 4535 imaged with the Very Large Telescope at the Paranal Observatory in Chile

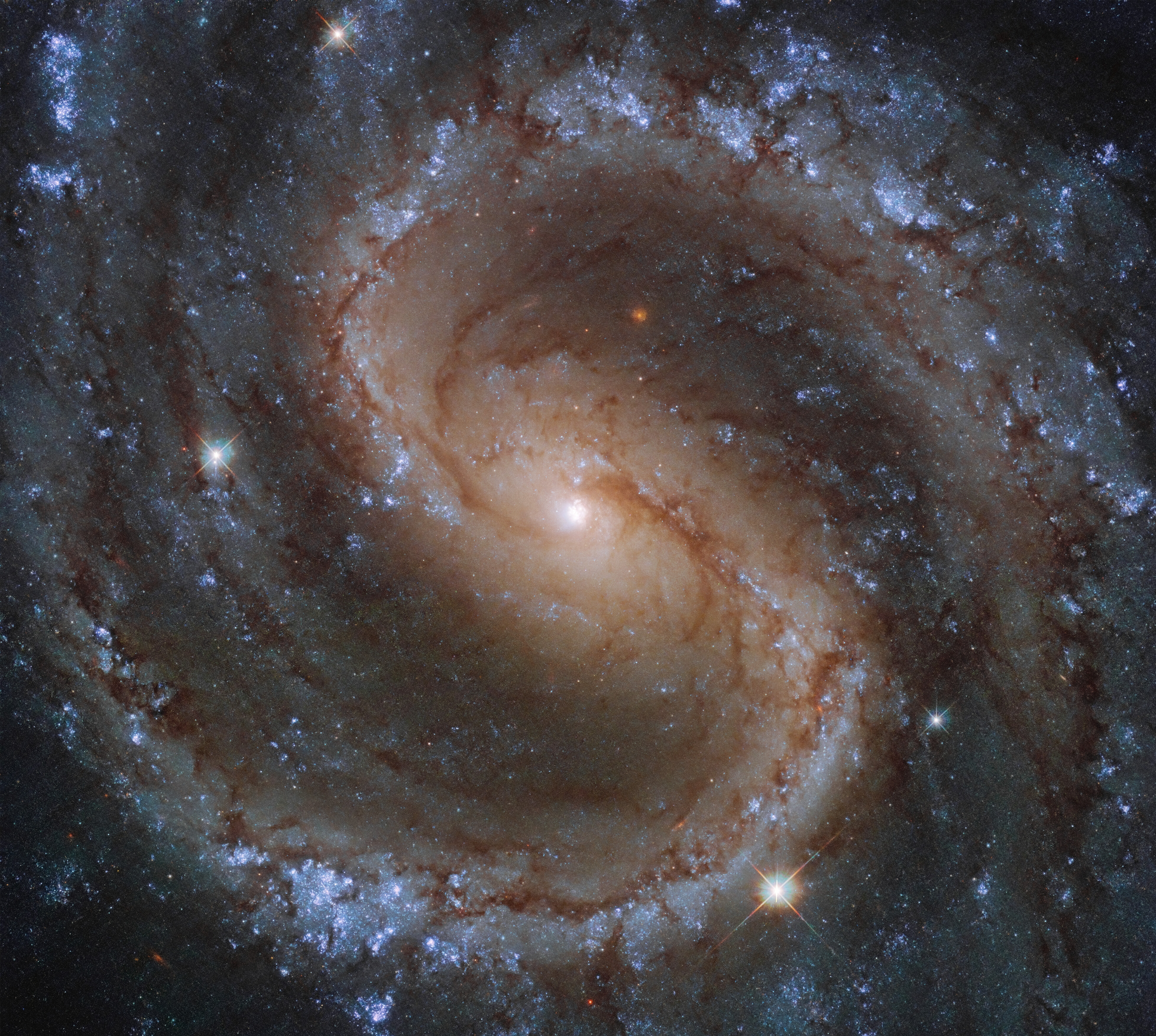
NGC 4535 imaged by the Hubble Space Telescope

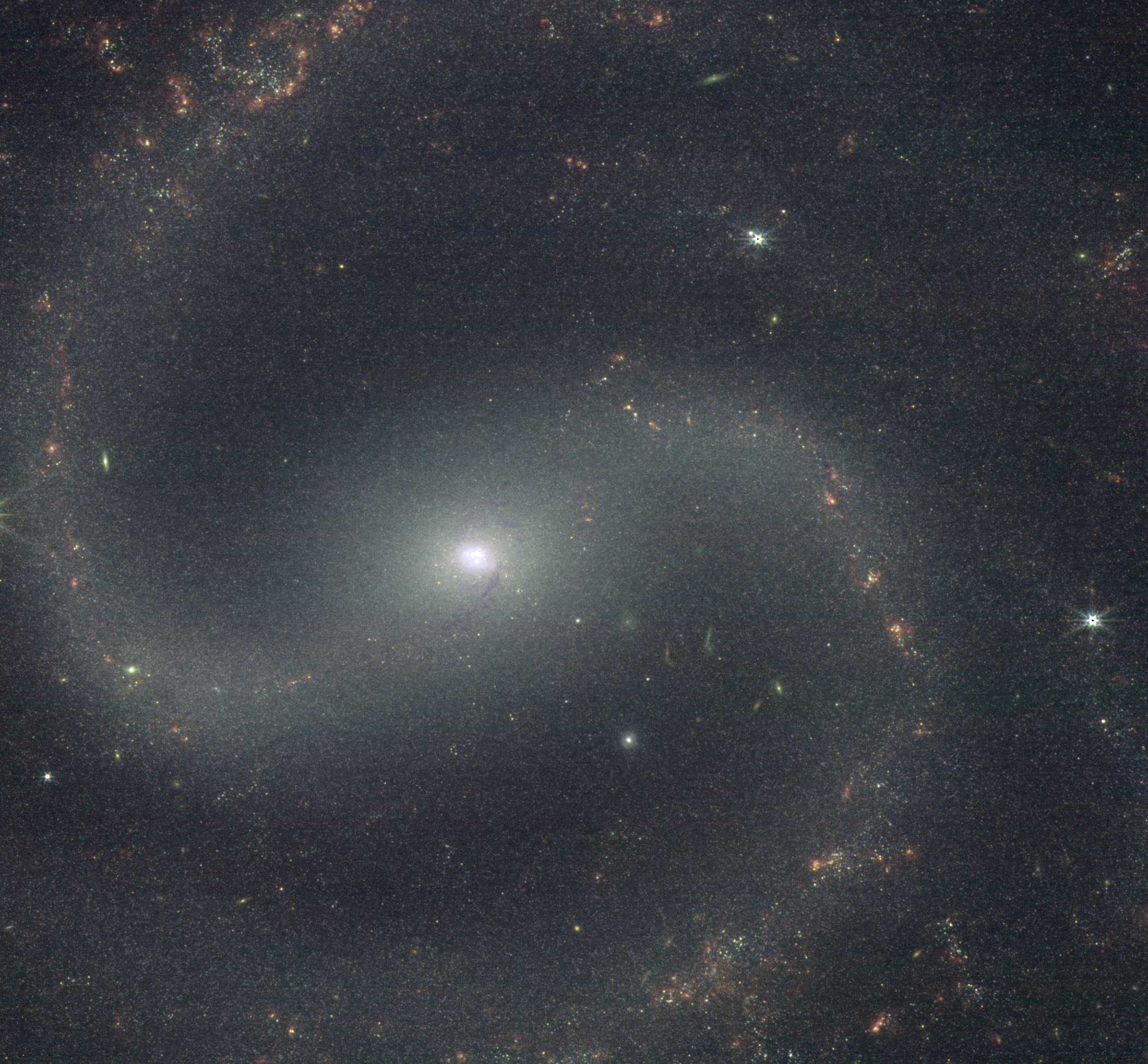
JWST NIRCam near-infrared image

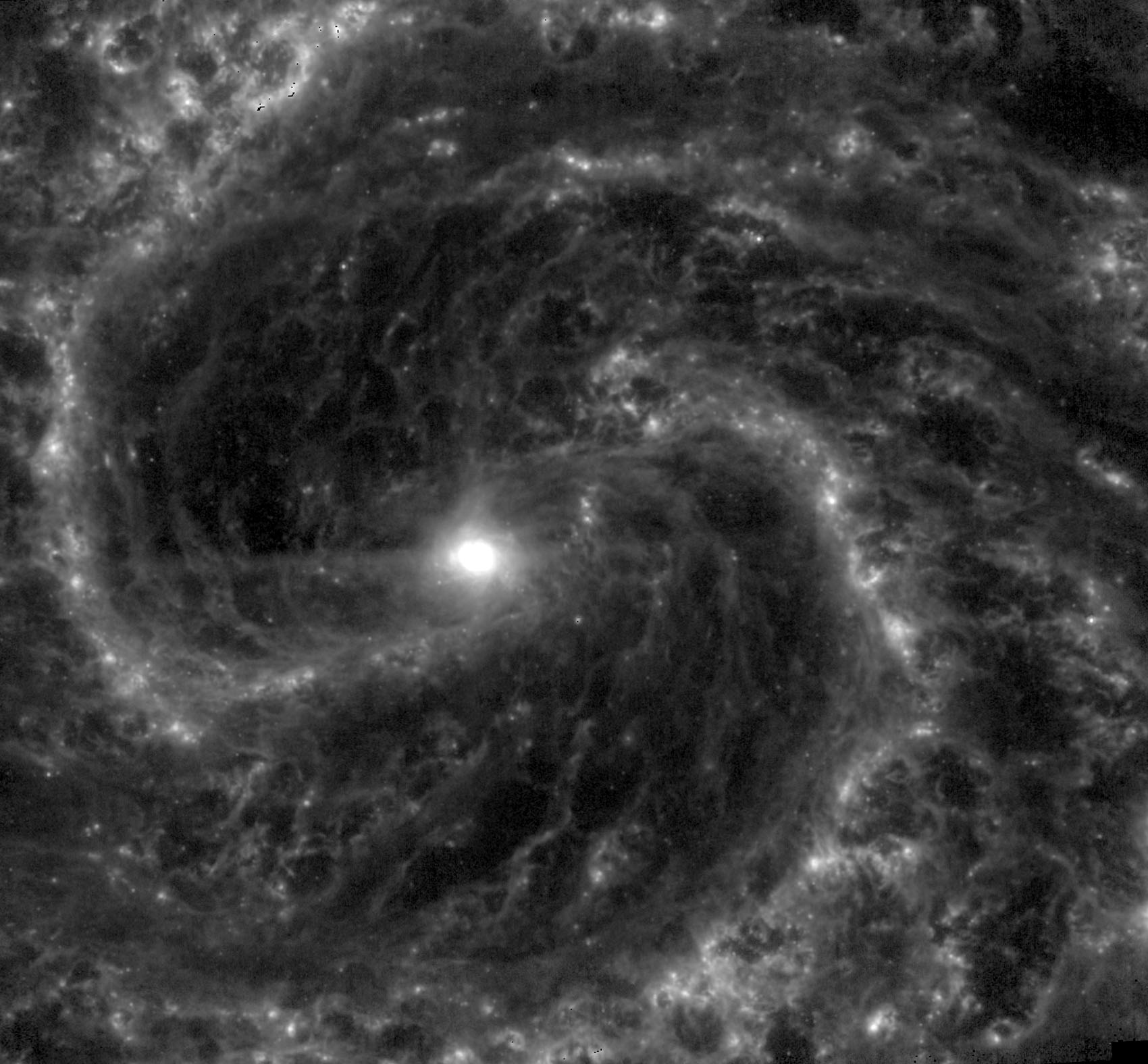
JWST MIRI mid-infrared image

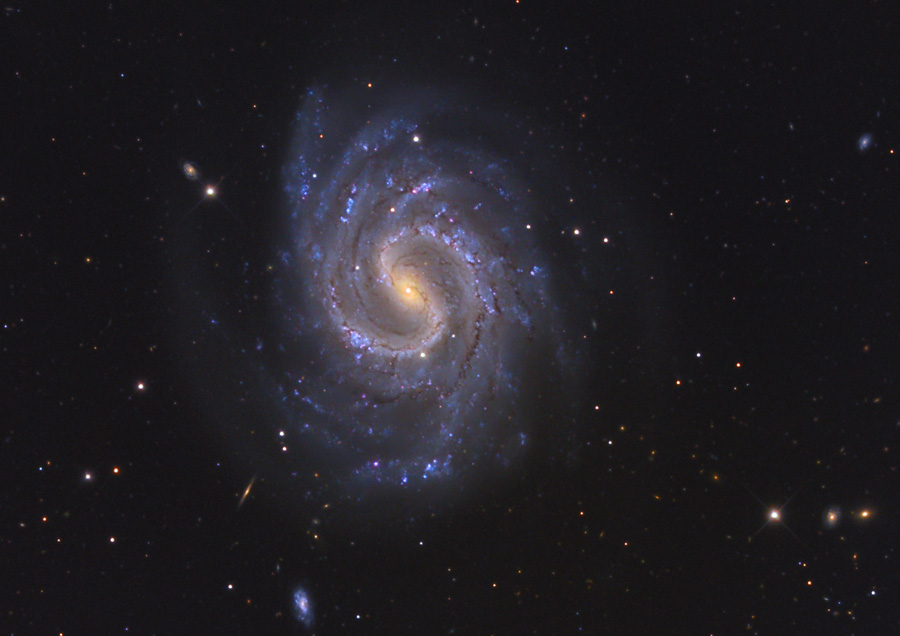
NGC 4535 imaged with a 24-inch telescope

== See also ==
- List of NGC objects (4001–5000)
