= Leonida Rosino =

Italian astronomer (1917–1997)

- Born: September 19, 1915; Treviso, Italy
- Died: July 31, 1997 (aged 81); Padua, Italy
- Scientific career
- Fields: Astronomy
- Workplaces: University of Padua, Asiago Astrophysical Observatory
- Academic advisors: Bruno Rossi

Leonida Rosino (Treviso, 19 September 1915 – Padua, 31 July 1997) was an Italian astronomer, known for having discovered 23 supernovae.

== Biography ==
After graduating in physics from the University of Padua in 1938, he devoted himself to astronomy, becoming an assistant to Giovanni Silva. His scientific training was completed by a two-year stay at the Yerkes Observatory of the University of Chicago, from 1948 to 1950.

He obtained a degree in astronomy in 1948; from 1939 to 1953 he was first assistant and then professor in charge of spectroscopy at the University of Bologna, at the chair of Francesco Zagar. He became full professor of astronomy at the University of Cagliari in 1953, then moved to the University of Bologna in 1954 and, in 1956, to the University of Padua, where he remained until his appointment as professor emeritus. In 1956 he became the director of the Asiago Astrophysical Observatory.

Author of over 250 scientific publications, he made original contributions to the study of variable stars, globular clusters, and the physics of novae and supernovae, which made him internationally famous. He discovered 23 supernovae (five of them together with other scientists); he also discovered the cataclysmic variable AL Comae Berenices on 16 November 1961.

Leonida Rosino was a member of many national and international scientific societies including the Accademia dei Lincei and the Veneto Institute of Sciences, Letters and Arts.

The Asiago Cima Ekar Observing Station was named in his memory on 15 November 1997. In the station there is a plaque with his image, bearing the inscription "Leonida Rosino 1915 - 1997 Unparalleled master, creator and creator of this astronomical station - November 15, 1997".

== Major works ==
- Fisica delle stelle, Vallardi, Milan, 1956
- Observations et interpretation de l'etoile variable SS Cygny, Vallardi, Milan, 1960
- Luci e ombre nella conoscenza del mondo fisico (1970)
- Photometric and spectroscopic studies of novae and supernovae (1971)
- Lezioni di astronomia, CEDAM, Padova, 1979
- Gli astri: Dal sistema solare alle galassie, UTET, Torino, 1985

== Honors ==
Leonida Rosino has been awarded an honorary degree by two universities:

- University of Basel (1970)
- University of Innsbruck (1989)

The asteroid 7715 Leonidarosino was named in his honor.
