= NGC 4699 =

Spiral galaxy in the constellation Virgo

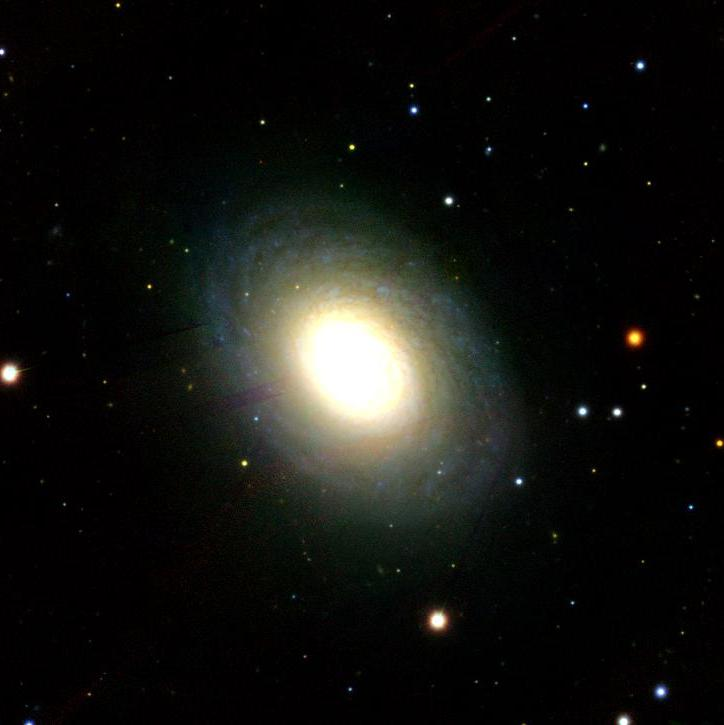
- Image of NGC 4699 by PanSTARRS

Observation data (J2000 epoch)
- Constellation: Virgo
- Right ascension: 12^{h} 49^{m} 02.2^{s}
- Declination: −08° 39′ 54″
- Redshift: 1394 ± 4 km/s
- Distance: 64 ± 24 Mly (19.7 ± 7.5 Mpc)
- Apparent magnitude (V): 9.6

Characteristics
- Type: SAB(rs)b
- Apparent size (V): 3.8′ × 2.6′

Other designations
- UGCA 301, MCG -01-33-013, PGC 43321

NGC 4699, also known as the Vinyl LP Galaxy, is an intermediate spiral galaxy located in the constellation Virgo. It is located at a distance of about 65 million light years from Earth, which, given its apparent dimensions, means that NGC 4699 is about 85,000 light years across. It was discovered by William Herschel in 1786. It is a member of the NGC 4699 Group of galaxies, which is a member of the Virgo II Groups, a series of galaxies and galaxy clusters strung out from the southern edge of the Virgo Supercluster.

== Characteristics ==
NGC 4699 is a Seyfert like galaxy with very weak nuclear emission. The galaxy features a bar that is 0.41 arcminutes long and a ring with diameter 1.95 arcminutes. The galaxy features a large bulge which accounts for the 11.3% of the stellar mass of the galaxy and a large disky pseudobulge, which is larger than the strong bar. The disk within the bulge features tightly wrapped spiral arms. There are many HII regions in the disk. The galaxy has an extended type-III outer disk, with low central surface magnitude and which is thicker than the inner disk.

== Supernovae ==
Three supernovae have been observed in NGC 4699:

- SN 1948A (type unknown, mag. 17) was discovered by Edwin Hubble on 5 March 1948.
- SN 1983K (Type II-P, mag. 17) was discovered by Marina Wischnjewsky on 6 June 1983. The supernova had brightened from magnitude 17 on discovery, to magnitude 14 on 10 June 1983. It had a plateau-shaped light curve, and its spectra featured a progressive violet shift, which was explained by the presence of a preexisting outer shell of materials around the progenitor of the supernova.
- SN 2024muv (Type Ia, mag. 14.4692) was discovered by the Zwicky Transient Facility on 26 June 2024.

== Nearby galaxies ==
NGC 4699 belongs in the NGC 4697 group according to Makarov and Karachentsev. Other members of the group include NGC 4697, NGC 4674, NGC 4700, NGC 4731, NGC 4742, NGC 4775, NGC 4781, NGC 4784, NGC 4790, NGC 4813, NGC 4948 and NGC 4958. It belongs to the Virgo II groups, an extension of the Virgo Cluster.

== Gallery ==
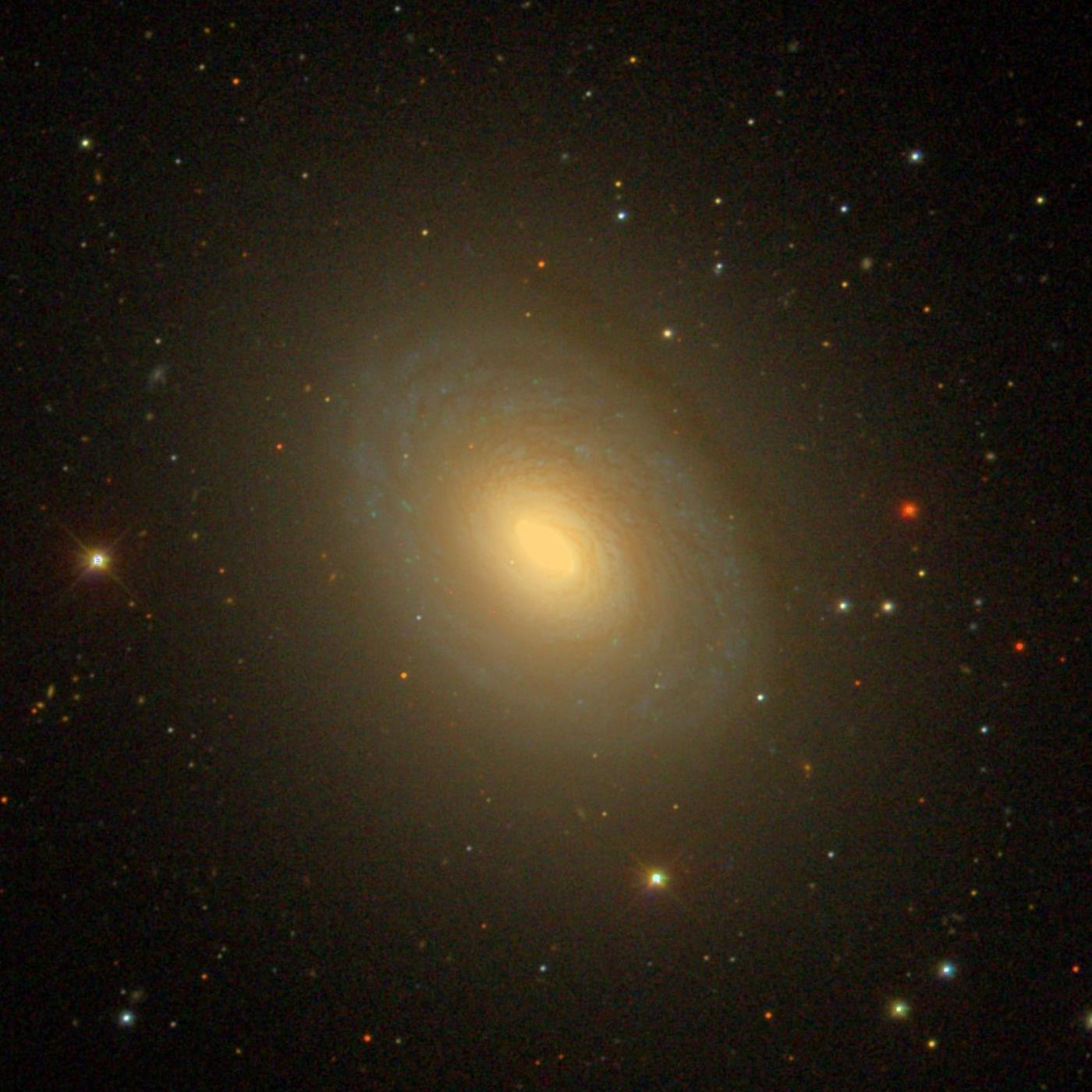
NGC 4699 by the Sloan Digital Sky Survey
