= NGC 4941 =

Galaxy in the constellation Virgo

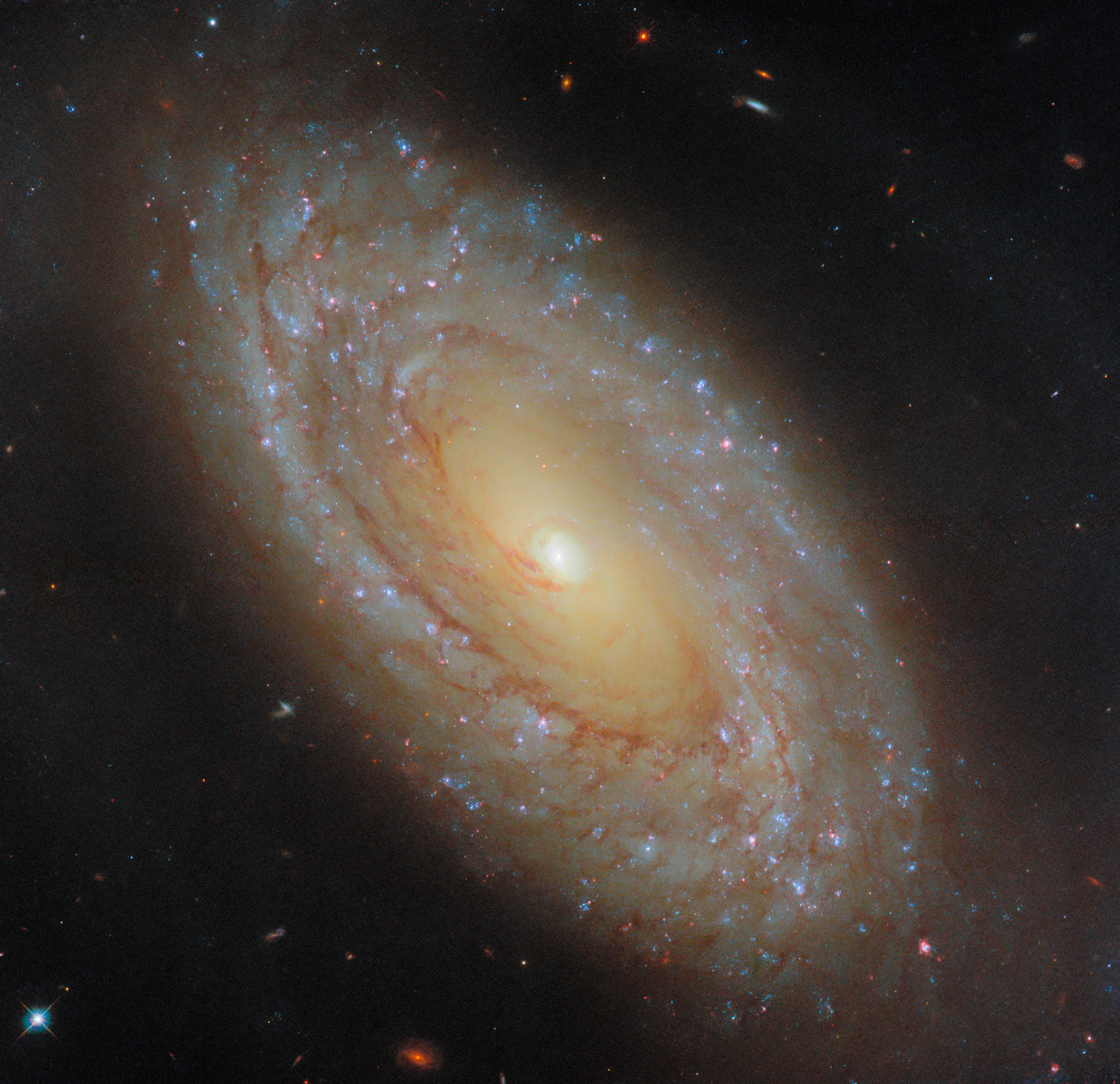
- NGC 4941 imaged by the Hubble Space Telescope

Observation data (J2000 epoch)
- Constellation: Virgo
- Right ascension: 13^{h} 04^{m} 13.0970^{s}
- Declination: −05° 33′ 05.744″
- Redshift: 0.003776 ± 0.000007
- Heliocentric radial velocity: 1,132 ± 2 km/s
- Distance: 44.57 ± 7.10 Mly (13.664 ± 2.178 Mpc)
- Group or cluster: NGC 4941 Group
- Apparent magnitude (V): 11.2

Characteristics
- Type: (R)SAB(r)ab
- Size: ~60,700 ly (18.61 kpc) (estimated)
- Apparent size (V): 3.6′ × 1.9′
- Notable features: Seyfert galaxy

Other designations
- IRAS 13016-0516, UGCA 321, MCG -01-33-077, PGC 45165

NGC 4941 is a spiral galaxy in the constellation Virgo. The galaxy lies about 45 million light years away from Earth, which means, given its apparent dimensions, that NGC 4941 is approximately 60,000 light years across. It was discovered by German-British astronomer William Herschel on April 24, 1784.

== Characteristics ==
NGC 4941 has an elliptical bulge which appears twisted. Two spiral arms emerge from the major axis of the bulge. The arms are smooth and low contrast and appear symmetric. The arms fade after about half a revolution and merge into the disk. Multiple spiral fragments are visible in the disk, along with dust lanes. The galaxy has two very low surface brightness outer arms. HII regions are visible along the arms. The galaxy has two rings, one between 37 and 73 arcseconds from the nucleus, and one outer between 81 and 120 arcseconds from the nucleus. A weak bar is visible between the two rings.

=== Nucleus ===
The nucleus of NGC 4941 has been found to be active and it has been categorised as a type II Seyfert galaxy. The most accepted theory for the energy source of active galactic nuclei is the presence of an accretion disk around a supermassive black hole. The mass of the black hole in the centre of NGC 4941 is estimated to be 10^{6.91} (8.1 million) M_{☉}.

Imaging of the [S III] emission in the narrow-line region of the nucleus by the Gemini Multi-Object Spectrograph showed there is a blueshifted element running along a small northwest radio emission indicating there is a compact outflow associated with a radio jet. The length of the outflow is estimated to be about 150 parsec. There is a redshift element at the opposite direction, indicating there is one more outflow, but without a counterpart visible in radiowaves. The radio jet is about 15 parsec long.

The nucleus of NGC 4941 is a source of X-rays. The spectrum indicates it is highly absorbed. The Fe-Kα line is detectable. The X-ray emission shows variability in the timescale of months to years when comparing observations by ASCA and BeppoSAX. The spectrum shows a partially or fully absorbed component, a reflection from the accretion disk and from the circumnuclear torus, a scattered component and thermal plasma emission, maybe a result of increased star formation activity. The hard X-ray luminosity of the nucleus is estimated to be 4.5×10^{41} erg/s.

Although the nucleus appears deficient in molecular gas, there is some CO(3-2) emission which corresponds to a molecular gas mass of 1.9–3.3 × 10^{4} M_{☉}. The CO nuclear emission shows two peaks in a butterfly shape.

== Nearby galaxies ==
NGC 4941 is a member of the NGC 4941 Group, along with NGC 4951. A. M. Garcia considers the galaxy a member of the NGC 4697 Group, also known as LGG 314. Other members of the group include NGC 4697, NGC 4731, NGC 4775, NGC 4951, NGC 4948, and NGC 4958. It is part of a Virgo II Groups, a chain of groups extending from the Virgo Cluster.

== Gallery ==
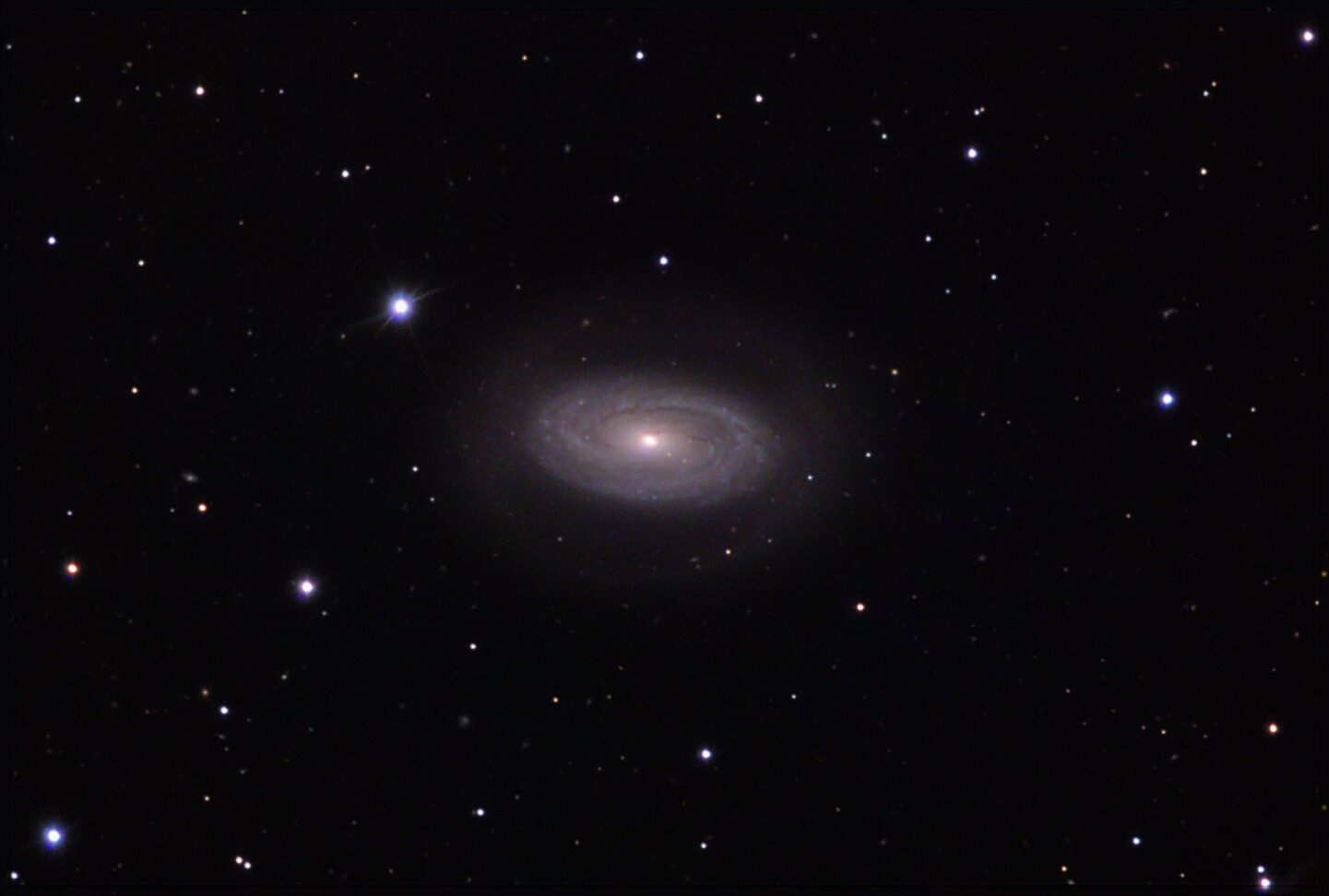
NGC 4941 imaged by the Kitt Peak National Observatory

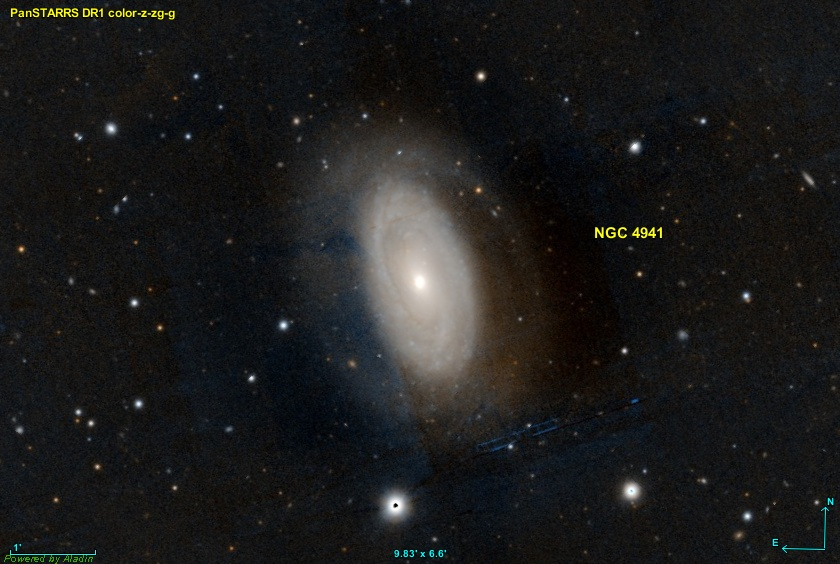
NGC 4941 imaged by PanSTARRS

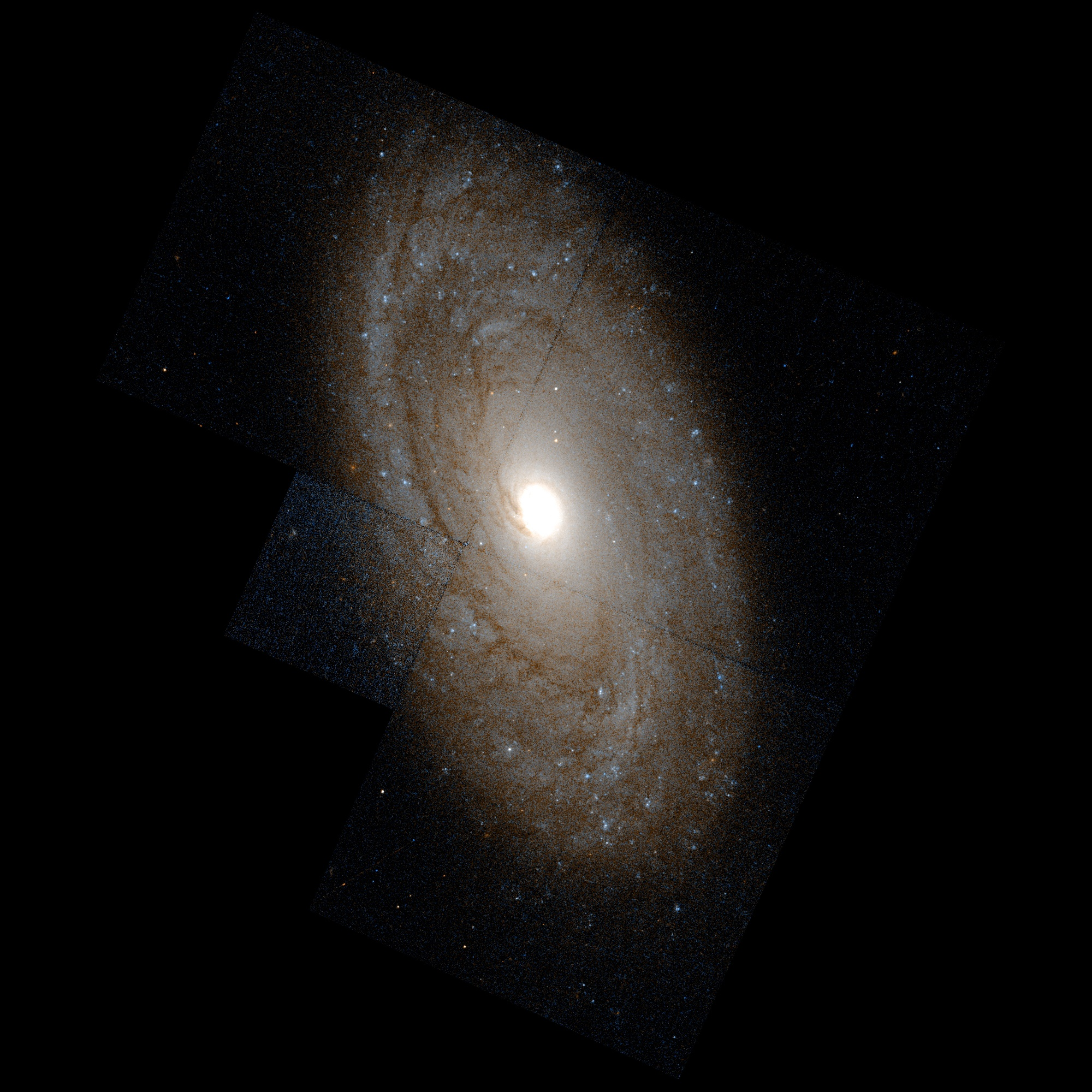
NGC 4941 by the Hubble Space Telescope
