= NGC 4332 =

Galaxy

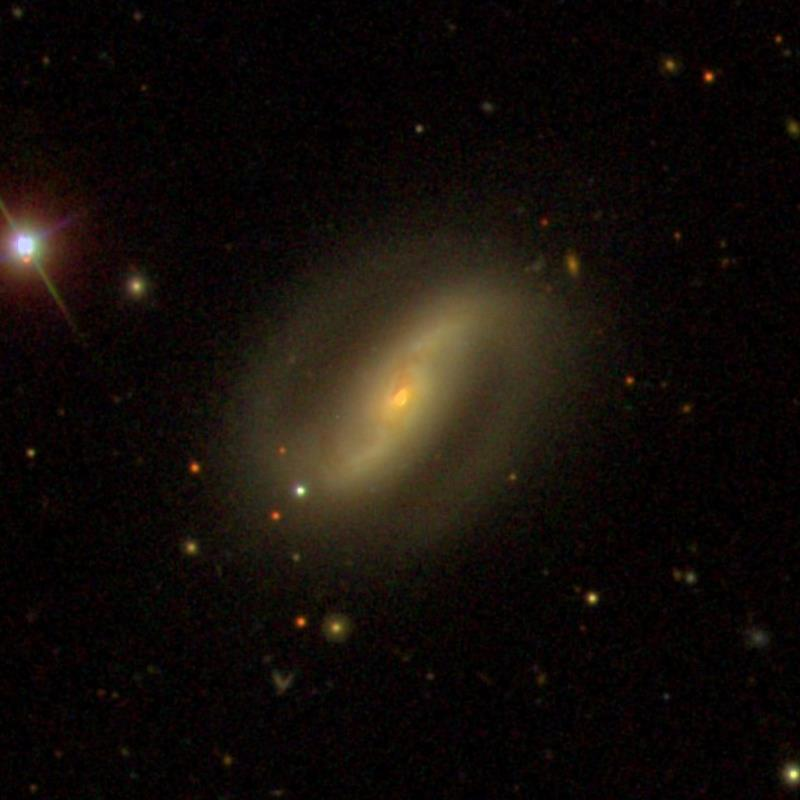
- SDSS image of NGC 4332.

Observation data (J2000 epoch)
- Constellation: Draco
- Right ascension: 12^{h} 22^{m} 46.7^{s}
- Declination: 65° 50′ 38″
- Redshift: 0.009228
- Heliocentric radial velocity: 2766 km/s
- Distance: 128 Mly (39.2 Mpc)
- Group or cluster: NGC 4256 Group (NGC 4210 Subgroup)
- Apparent magnitude (V): 13.3

Characteristics
- Type: SB(s)a
- Size: ~102,200 ly (31.34 kpc) (estimated)
- Apparent size (V): 1.04 x 0.70

Other designations
- UGC 07453, PGC 040133, MCG +11-15-048, CGCG 315-033

NGC 4332 is a barred spiral galaxy and a starburst galaxy located 128 million light-years away in the constellation Draco. The galaxy was discovered by astronomer William Herschel on March 20, 1790. NGC 4332 is host to a supermassive black hole with an estimated mass of 9.5×10^{7} solar masses.

== NGC 4256 Group ==
NGC 4332 is a member of the NGC 4256 Group, and is located in a subgroup surrounding the galaxy NGC 4210. The NGC 4256 Group is located within the Canes Venatici-Camelopardalis Cloud, which lies in the First Upper Plane of the Virgo Supercluster.

According to A. M. Garcia, the NGC 4256 group has at least 7 members. The other galaxies in the group are NGC 4108, NGC 4210, NGC 4221, NGC 4256, NGC 4513 and NGC 4108B (PGC 38461).

== SN 2009an ==
NGC 4332 has hosted one supernova, a Type Ia supernova designated as SN 2009an that had an apparent magnitude of 15.4. The supernova was discovered by Giancarlo Cortini and Stefano Antonellini with a 35-cm telescope at the Monte Maggiore Observatory in Predappio, Italy on February 27, 2009. It was independently discovered by Petri Kehusmaa of Hyvinkaa, Finland and Mikko Paivinen of Rajamaki, Finland on February 28, 2009, using a 28-cm Schmidt-Cassegrain reflector.

SN 2009an had absolute magnitude of -18.841 ± 5 in the blue part of the spectrum. This makes it dimmer than a normal Type Ia supernova. Also, SN 2009an had a light curve that declined a lot faster than a normal Type Ia supernova. Additionally, the bolometric luminosity is estimated at 42.89 erg/s, implying that about 0.41 solar masses of were synthesized in the supernova. However, to account for additional flux lost from UV and NIR light bands, the estimate for the amount of nickel-56 thought to have formed in the supernova increases to 0.50 solar masses. Lastly, spectroscopic data show that SN 2009an has high-velocity features which are observed in the calcium triplet during its pre-maximum and early post-maximum phases. However, the post-maximum spectral evolution resembles a normal Type Ia supernovae, with SN 2009an containing broad Si II 6355 Å lines and Si II 5972 Å lines that are stronger than a normal Type Ia supernova.

These properties make Sn 2009an most similar to another Type Ia supernova known as SN 2004eo. It is thought that supernovae like SN 2009an and SN 2004eo form from the explosion of a white dwarf with lower amounts of kinetic energy than a normal Type Ia supernova and produce more stable elements from the Iron-Group of the periodic table such as iron, nickel and others. These types of Type Ia supernovae account for only 15% of all observed Type Ia supernovae known as non-standard or transitional Type Ia events.

== See also ==
- List of NGC objects
- List of NGC objects (4001–5000)
- NGC 4513-Ring galaxy in the NGC 4256 Group
