= NGC 4221 =

Galaxy in constellation Draco

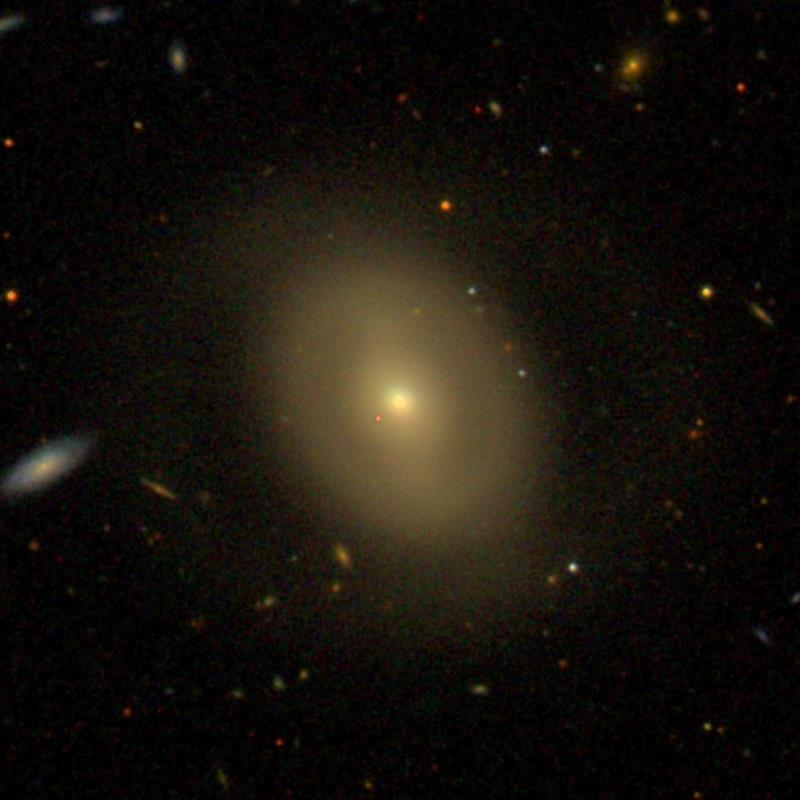
- SDSS image of NGC 4221

Observation data (J2000 epoch)
- Constellation: Draco
- Right ascension: 12^{h} 15^{m} 59.860^{s}
- Declination: +66° 13′ 50.90″
- Redshift: 0.00439
- Heliocentric radial velocity: 1313 ± 3 km/s
- Distance: 75.9 Mly (23.28 Mpc)
- Group or cluster: NGC 4256 Group
- Apparent magnitude (B): 13.6

Characteristics
- Type: (R)SB0^{+}(r)
- Size: 55,900 ly (17.15 kpc) (estimated)
- Apparent size (V): 1.347′ × 0.943′

Other designations
- UGC 7288, MCG +11-15-040, PGC 39266

NGC 4221 is a barred lenticular galaxy located about 75.9 million light-years (23.28 megaparsecs) away in the constellation of Draco. It was discovered on April 3, 1832, by the astronomer John Herschel. NGC 4221 is notable for having an outer ring that surrounds the inner barred central region of the galaxy.

== Group Membership ==
NGC 4221 is a member of the NGC 4256 Group, the NGC 4256 group has at least 7 members. The other galaxies in the group are NGC 4108, NGC 4210, NGC 4256, NGC 4332, NGC 4513 and NGC 4108B (PGC 38461). which lies in the upper plane of the Virgo Supercluster.

== See also ==
- List of NGC objects (4001–5000)
- NGC 2859 - similar looking galaxy
