= CA2 =

CA2, CA-2 or CA II may refer to:

- Carbonic anhydrase II, a human gene
- United States Court of Appeals for the Second Circuit
- California's 2nd congressional district
- Hummel CA-2, an ultralight aircraft
- California State Route 2
- Ca II, a singly-ionized calcium that produces the calcium triplet lines in the spectrum of many stars
- Cornu Ammonis 2, a region of the hippocampus

== See also ==
- Ca^{2+}, a calcium cation
