= 4C +26.42 =

Elliptical galaxy in the constellation of Boötes

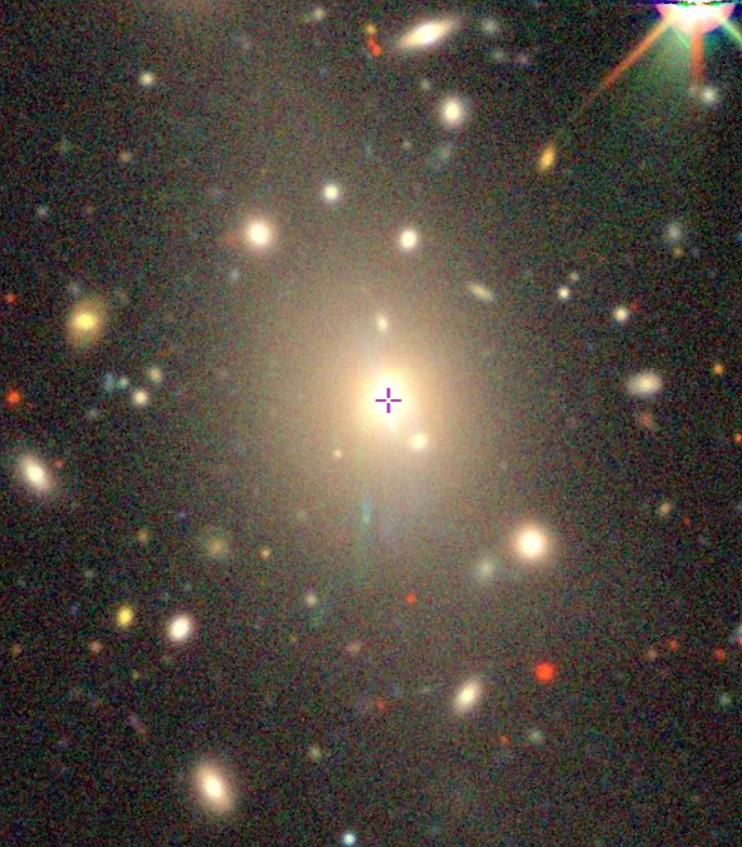
- 4C +26.42, as seen by DESI Legacy Surveys

Observation data (J2000 epoch)
- Constellation: Boötes
- Right ascension: 13^{h} 48^{m} 52.54^{s}
- Declination: +26° 35′ 33.65″
- Redshift: 0.063309
- Heliocentric radial velocity: 18,980 km/s
- Distance: 863 Mly (264.6 Mpc)
- Group or cluster: Abell 1795
- Apparent magnitude (V): 0.037
- Apparent magnitude (B): 0.048
- Surface brightness: 15.2

Characteristics
- Type: cD; S0?;LINER S3
- Size: ~523,700 ly (160.56 kpc) (estimated)
- Apparent size (V): 1.0' × 1.0'
- Notable features: Radio galaxy, brightest cluster galaxy

Other designations
- CGCG 162-010, MCG +05-33-005, PGC 49005, 7C 1346+2650 PKS 1346+26, TXS 1346+268, NVSS J134852+263533

4C +26.42 is an elliptical galaxy located in the constellation of Boötes. It has a redshift of 0.063, estimating the galaxy to be located 863 million light-years from Earth. It has an active galactic nucleus and is the brightest cluster galaxy (BCG) in Abell 1795, an X-ray luminous rich cluster (L_{X} 10^{45} ergs s^{−1}), with an estimated cooling-flow rate of 300 M yr^{−1}.

== Properties ==
4C +26.42 is one of the powerful radio galaxies inhabiting the center of the cluster. Radio-loud, low-luminous and classified as a Fanaroff-Riley class I, the galaxy contains a strong double-lobed radio source, that stretches ≈10 kpc on both sides of the nucleus region measuring P_{1.4} 10^{25} W Hz^{−1} and found occupying inside the cluster flow. It has a radial velocity of 365 km s^{−1}, with a complex core structure, and pole-on dispersion in diameter, indicating a marginal intrinsic dispersion. Furthermore, it is a LINEAR galaxy, with an emission spectrum characterized by broad weak ion atoms.

The galaxy is known have a pair of filaments, coiled together. Known as the "SE Filament", they are estimated to have a distance of ~ 42″ and 35″ respectively but have unresolved widths in Hα (< 0.7″ ~ 1 kpc) with thin-looking appearances, reminding of magnetic field lines.

A structure has been discovered inside the envelope of 4C +26.42. Traced from a previous merger with another giant subcluster galaxy, the structure has a measurement of 400 kpc from the center which protrudes towards the north–south direction. When reached at the largest radius, a low-surface brightness region is found, with a slight angle pointing towards east direction. According to researchers, the total I-band magnitude and envelope of the galaxy is -26.6, making 4C +26.42 among the brightest galaxies known.

== Nebula line emission ==
4C +26.42 contains a nebular line emission found coruscating. With a luminosity range of L(Hα) ≈ 10^{42} ergs s^{−1}, within 20 kpc from the central galaxy, the line emission is embedded inside a filament extending towards the southern nucleus region by 80 kpc. An excessive blue light is also found as well, which is probably emitted out from both young stars in globular clusters and massive star populations located inside the galaxy similar to Hydra A.

== Molecular outflows by radio bubbles ==
4C +26.42 is known to manifest robust molecular 10^{9} M_{⊙} gas flows, with molecular gas positioned in a pair of filaments. With an estimated length of ~ 7 kpc, north and south from the nucleus, the filaments are jutted around the outer edges of two inflated radio bubbles, caused by evaporation of plasma through heated radio jets launched by the galaxy.

Results shows North filament is found flat and increased velocity gradient that goes from the systemic velocity at the nucleus to a maximum velocity of −370 km s^{−1}. As for the South filament, it shows the opposite by having a shallow velocity gradient, practically collapsed through starbursts. Through comparing both filaments together, they show a close bond specifying these filaments are indeed gas flows caused by the expansion of radio bubbles. Researchers concluded the total amount of molecular gas mass is 3.2 ± 0.2 billion M_{⊙}.

== Estimated star formation ==
The star formation in 4C +26.42 are shown to vary, based on different observations. Several studies shows, the estimated star formation rate is said to be smaller than 1–20 M_{⊙} yr^{−1} based on different data and methods. Based on ultraviolet imaging, it is said to betwixt of 5 and 20 M_{⊙} yr^{−1}. Deducing the initial mass function (IMF) as top-heavy with a slope of 3.3 yields, researchers suggested the star formation in 4C +26.42 is extremely high, reaching star formation rates of 581 and 758 M_{⊙} yr^{−1}.

It was not until then researchers decided to calculated the actual star formation in 4C +26.42. Detecting Lyman-alpha that is emitted from the galaxy, they found it has a significant number of O-type stars within luminosity ranges of 1500 Å, L_{1500} = 1.9 × 10^{42} ergs s^{−1}. Applying new methods like Galactic extinction law, extinction value (E_{B}_{−V} = 0.14) and foreground screen dust modes, they predicted the increase of O-type stars is 5.3 × 10^{4}. Accurately, the O-type stars is 2.4 × 10^{4} based on a modern spectroscopy method, indicating the actual star formation rate is only within the compass of 8-23 M_{⊙} yr^{−1}. Finally researchers used a star formation model corresponding to far-ultraviolet colors whom they found the star production rate in 4C +26.42 is 5-10 M yr^{−1} over the past 5 billion years.

== Radio morphology ==
According to Very Long Baseline Array observations at 1.6, 5, 8.4 and 22 GHz, 4C +26.42 has a two-sided source, with a geometrical Z-structure located from the core region by ~5 mas. The radio morphology is found on small-scale with core-power 5 GHz Log P_{core, 5 GHz} = 23.70 W/Hz and radio power results at 0.4 GHz Log P_{tot, 0.4 GHz}.

== Faraday rotational measure ==
The faraday rotational measure in 4C +26.42 is extortionate. Exceeding 2000 rad m^{−2} when observed in high resolution (0.6 arcsec) VLA images, the radio source is found polarized by 10% to 30%. The magnitude and the scale comparable with a boiling (10^{8}) and thick (0.03 cm^{−3}) X-ray emitting gas. Based on the degree of ordering, the magnetic field is within the ranges of 20 and 100 μG.

== See also ==
- Quasar
- 3C 273
