= NGC 4775 =

Galaxy in the constellation Virgo

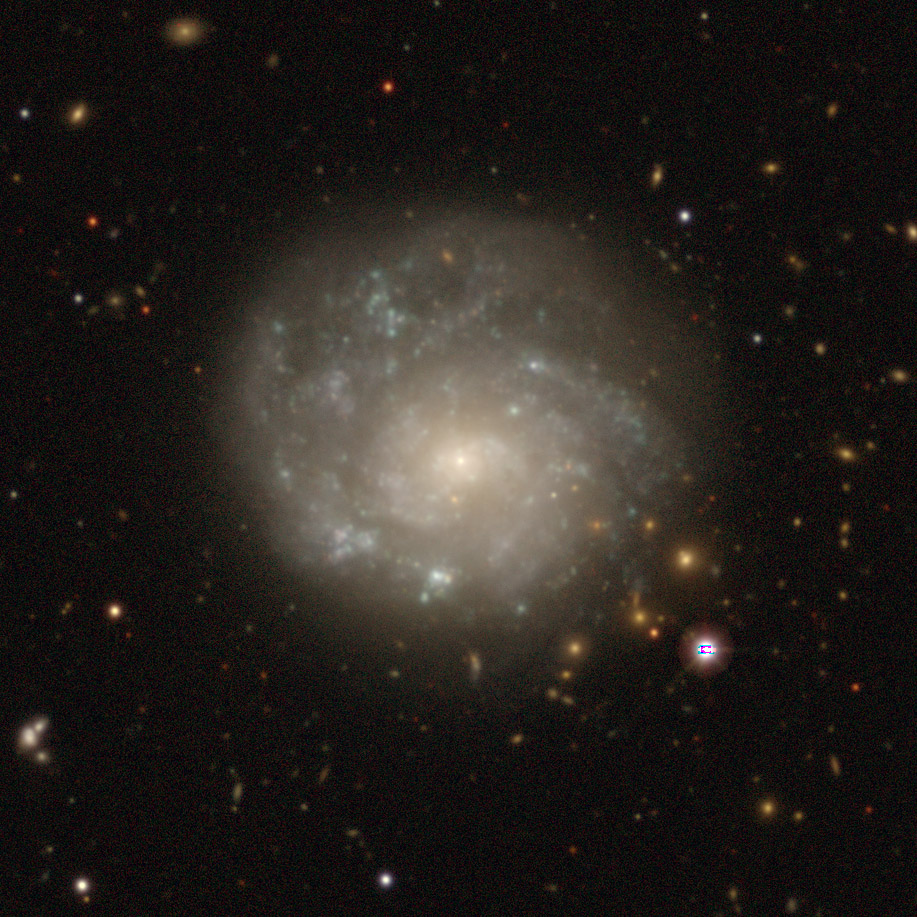
- NGC 4775 imaged by the Legacy Surveys

Observation data (J2000 epoch)
- Constellation: Virgo
- Right ascension: 12^{h} 53^{m} 45.7048^{s}
- Declination: −06° 37′ 20.669″
- Redshift: 0.005224 ± 0.000002
- Heliocentric radial velocity: 1,566 ± 1 km/s
- Distance: 53.1 ± 23.9 Mly (16.3 ± 7.3 Mpc)
- Group or cluster: NGC 4699 Group
- Apparent magnitude (V): 11.1

Characteristics
- Type: SA(s)d
- Size: ~34,000 ly (10.4 kpc) (estimated)
- Apparent size (V): 2.1′ × 2.0′

Other designations
- IRAS 12511-0621, UGCA 306, MCG -01-33-043, PGC 43826

NGC 4775 is a spiral galaxy in the constellation Virgo. The galaxy lies about 55 million light years away from Earth, which means, given its apparent dimensions, that NGC 4775 is approximately 35,000 light years across. It was discovered by William Herschel on April 25, 1784.

NGC 4775 has a small elliptical galactic bulge. The galaxy has faint and diffuse spiral arms. The pattern is asymmetric, with a very open and broad arm emerging from the southeast part of the disk and can be traced for about half a revolution. The other arm is very short but brighter. No clear pattern is discernible in the inner disk. There are many HII regions in the arms of NGC 4775 the largest of which is complex and about 4 arcseconds across. The nucleus hosts young stars but it is surrounded by older stars. The nucleus has higher metallicity than the rest of the galaxy. In the nucleus lies a nuclear star cluster which is 2.2 arcseconds across.

NGC 4775 is a member of the NGC 4697 Group, also known as LGG 314. Other members of the group include NGC 4697, NGC 4731, NGC 4941, NGC 4951, NGC 4948, and NGC 4958. It is part of a Virgo II Groups, a chain of groups extending from the Virgo Cluster.

== Gallery ==
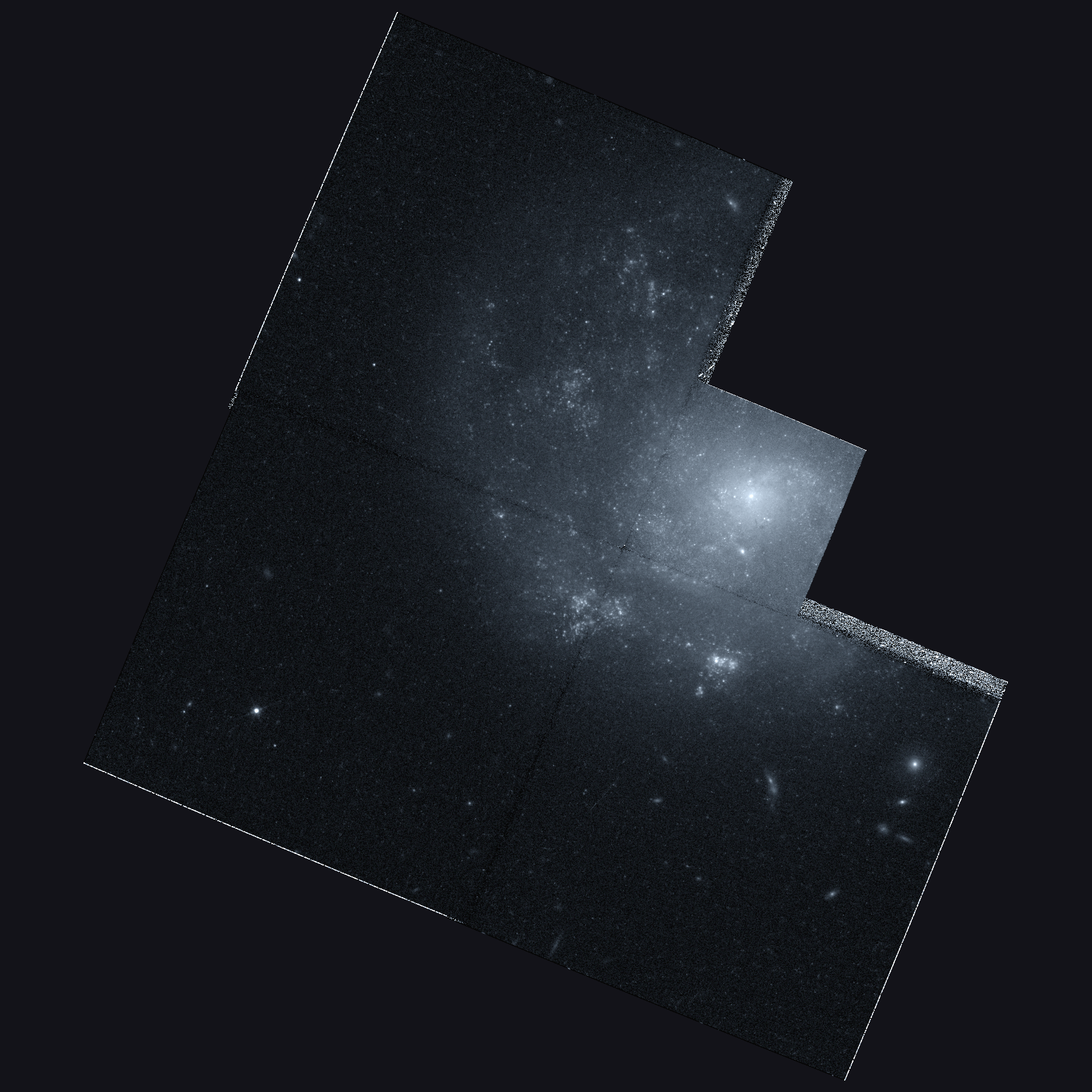
NGC 4775 imaged by Hubble Space Telescope

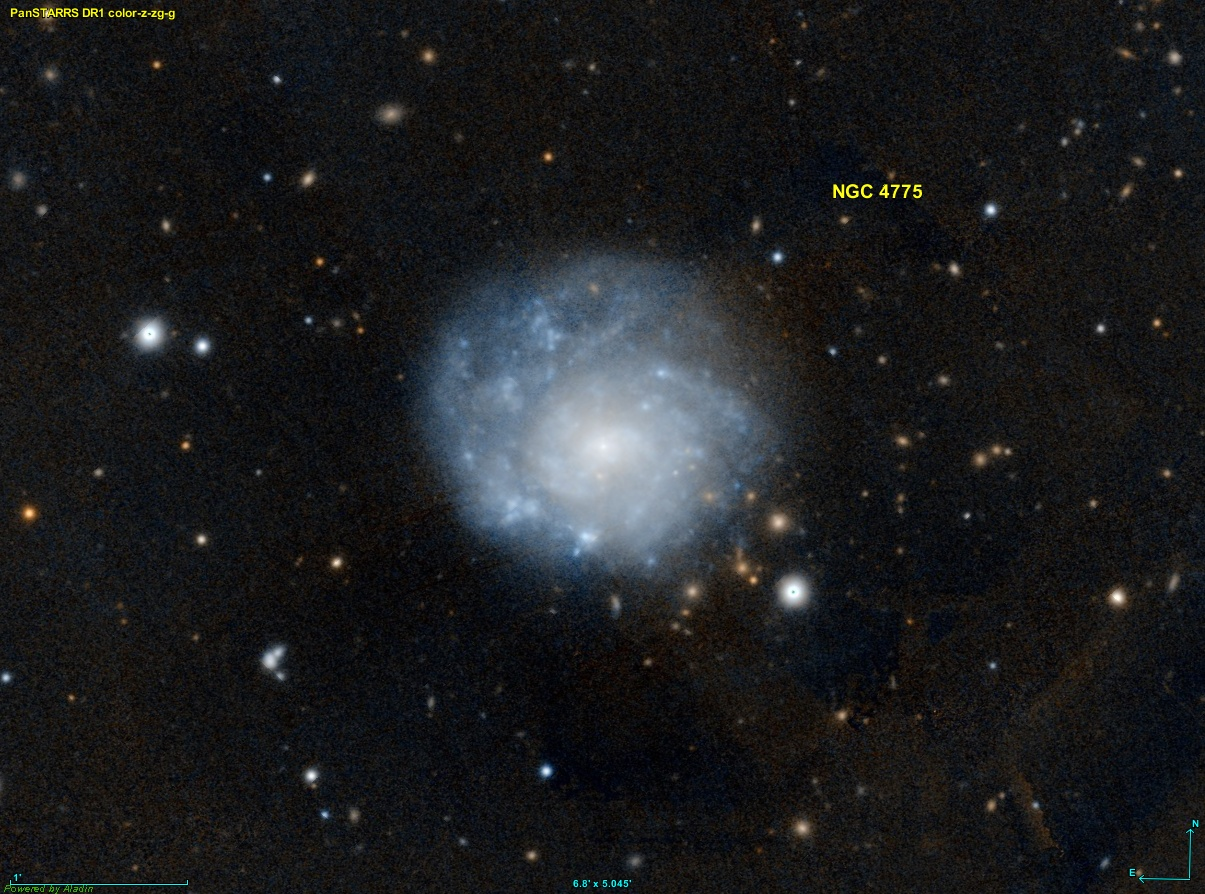
NGC 4775 by PanSTARRS
