= NGC 4958 =

Galaxy in the constellation Virgo

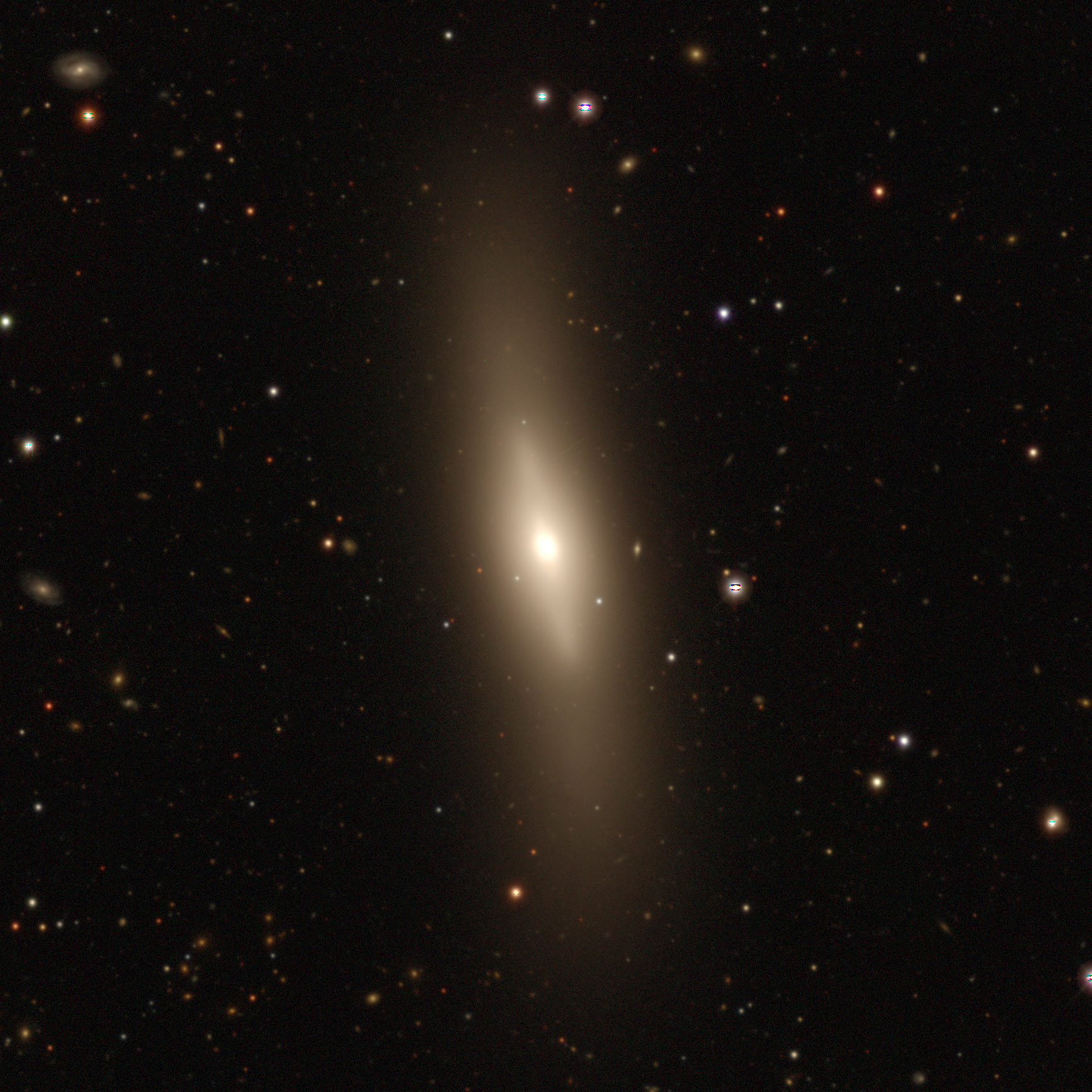
- NGC 4958 imaged by Legacy Surveys

Observation data (J2000 epoch)
- Constellation: Virgo
- Right ascension: 13^{h} 05^{m} 48.9027^{s}
- Declination: −08° 01′ 12.799″
- Redshift: 0.004853 ± 0.000030
- Heliocentric radial velocity: 1,455 ± 9 km/s
- Distance: 39.2 ± 22.4 Mly (12.0 ± 6.9 Mpc)
- Group or cluster: NGC 4697 Group
- Apparent magnitude (V): 10.7

Characteristics
- Type: SB(r)0?
- Size: ~46,000 ly (14.2 kpc) (estimated)
- Apparent size (V): 4.1′ × 1.3′

Other designations
- UGCA 323, MCG -01-33-084, PGC 45313

NGC 4958 is a barred lenticular galaxy in the constellation Virgo. The galaxy lies about 40 million light years away from Earth based on refshift-independent methods, which means, given its apparent dimensions, that NGC 4958 is approximately 45,000 light years across. Based on redshift the galaxy is about 80 million light years away. It was discovered by William Herschel on March 3, 1786. The galaxy is included in the Herschel 400 Catalogue. Through a small telescope it appears as a small but well concentrated circular glow.

NGC 4958 has an elliptical bulge embedded in a thick disk. A bright lens, measuring 1.8 by 0.45 arcminutes, with faint ansae surrounds the bulge. There is a possible ring with a diameter of 1.2 arcminutes. The nucleus is very bright. The optical spectrum of the nuclear region revealed the presence of a broad double-peaked H-alpha element, which was attributed to the presence of an accretion disk around the central supermassive black hole. Based on this spectrum the nucleus is considered to be active and has been characterised as a type 1 LINER. The mass of the supermassive black hole is estimated to be 10^{7.47+0.11
−0.03} (28 - 38 millions) M_{☉}.

NGC 4958 is a member of the NGC 4697 Group, also known as LGG 314. Other members of the group include NGC 4697, NGC 4731, NGC 4775, NGC 4941, NGC 4951, and NGC 4948. NGC 4948 lies 14 arcminutes away, while NGC 4948A is 13.5 arcminutes away. It is part of the Virgo II Groups, a chain of groups extending from the Virgo Cluster.
