= Atlas 3d survey =

Astronomical survey

- Website: www-astro.physics.ox.ac.uk/atlas3d/

ATLAS3D is an astronomical survey that considers every galaxy in the deep sky within the local (42 Mpc) volume (1.16×10^{5} Mpc^{3}) and uses multi-wavelength filters of a sample of 260 early-type galaxies. The survey produces cosmological simulations and semi-analytic modeling of galaxy formation. The first goal of this project is to quantify the global stellar kinematics and dynamics of a statistically significant sample of objects. This will enable the cataloging and characterization of early-type galaxies, as well as informing models of their formation and evolution.

ATLAS3D aims to probe the mass-assembly epochs and timescales in order to determine the history of star formation in the universe. The project also aims to characterize the different phases of the interstellar medium. This research process will link the kinematics of molecular, atomic and ionized gas with the dynamical structure, star formation and environment of the host galaxies. Another important contribution is the change of Hubble's classification of galaxies.
