= NGC 4722 =

Galaxy in the constellation Corvus

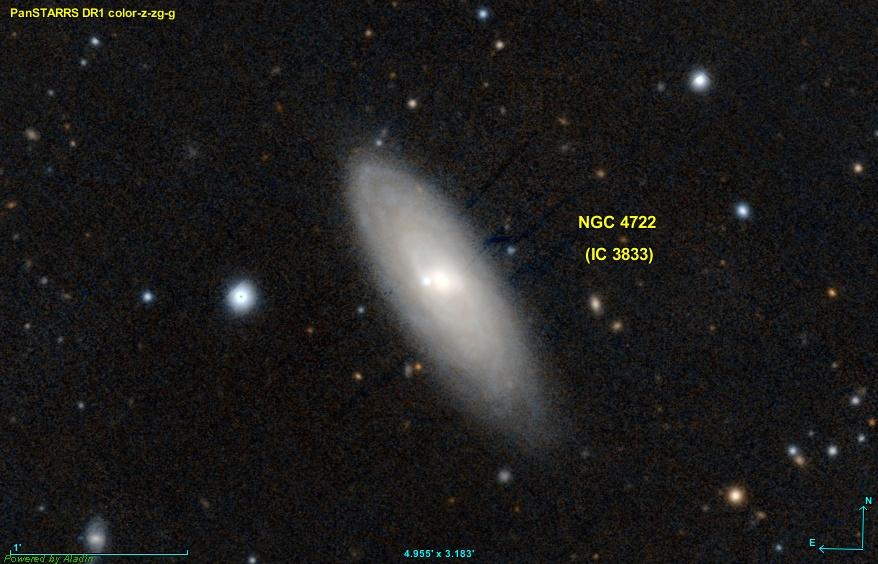
- NGC 4722 imaged by Pan-STARRS

Observation data (J2000 epoch)
- Constellation: Corvus
- Right ascension: 12^{h} 51^{m} 32.3681^{s}
- Declination: −13° 19′ 47.993″
- Redshift: 0.004376
- Heliocentric radial velocity: 1312 ± 9 km/s
- Distance: 79.3 ± 5.7 Mly (24.30 ± 1.75 Mpc)
- Group or cluster: NGC 4699 Group
- Apparent magnitude (V): 12.8

Characteristics
- Type: SB0/a(r)
- Size: ~59,200 ly (18.15 kpc) (estimated)
- Apparent size (V): 1.8′ × 0.7′

Other designations
- IRAS 12488-1303, 2MASX J12513239-1319482, IC 3833, MCG -02-33-031, PGC 43560

NGC 4722 is a lenticular galaxy in the constellation of Corvus. Its velocity with respect to the cosmic microwave background is 1647 ± 25 km/s, which corresponds to a Hubble distance of 79.3 ± 5.7 Mly (24.3 ± 1.75 Mpc). In addition, two non-redshift measurements give a farther distance of 89.2 ± 39.3 Mly (27.35 ± 12.05 Mpc). It was discovered by German astronomer Wilhelm Tempel in 1882. It was also observed by French astronomer Guillaume Bigourdan on 15 April 1895 and listed in the Index Catalogue as IC 3833.

NGC 4722 and NGC 4723 are listed together as Holm 471 in Erik Holmberg's A Study of Double and Multiple Galaxies Together with Inquiries into some General Metagalactic Problems, published in 1937.

== NGC 4699 group ==
According to A.M. Garcia, NGC 4722 is part of NGC 4699 Group (also known as LGG 307), which contains at least 15 galaxies, including NGC 4699, NGC 4700, NGC 4742, NGC 4781, NGC 4790, NGC 4802, and NGC 4818.

The NGC 4699 group is part of the Virgo II cluster, a cluster located at the southern boundary of the Virgo Cluster. This cluster is part of the Virgo Supercluster.

== Supernova ==
One supernova has been observed in NGC 4722: SN 2024ablh (Type II, mag. 17.17) was discovered by the Automatic Learning for the Rapid Classification of Events (ALeRCE) on 18 November 2024.

== See also ==
- List of NGC objects (4001–5000)
