= Jean P. Brodie =

British astrophysicist

- Education: University of London (B.Sc.); University of Cambridge (Ph.D.)
- Awards: Guggenheim Fellowship (1990)
- Scientific career
- Fields: Astrophysics
- Workplaces: University of California, Berkeley; University of Cambridge; University of California, Santa Cruz; Swinburne University of Technology

Jean P. Brodie is a British astrophysicist and the Director of the Centre of Astrophysics and Supercomputing at Swinburne University, Melbourne, Australia. Formerly, she was professor of astronomy and astrophysics at the University of California, Santa Cruz and an astronomer at the Lick Observatory.

== Education ==
Brodie has a B.Sc. from the University of London and a Ph.D. from Emmanuel College, Cambridge and the Institute of Astronomy, Cambridge.

== Career ==
After her doctorate at Cambridge, Brodie became a post-doctoral fellow at University of California, Berkeley (1980–82), then a Chambers Research Fellow at Girton College, Cambridge and a SERC Postdoctoral Fellow at the Institute of Astronomy, Cambridge (1982–84). She returned to UCB as an assistant research astronomer (1984–87), after which she took up a post of assistant professor/astronomer at the University of California, Santa Cruz in 1987, and became associate professor/astronomer there in 1991 and professor/astronomer in 1997. In 2020 she moved to the Center for Astrophysics and Supercomputing at the Swinburne University of Technology.

Her main research interests are globular star clusters and galaxy formation.

She founded the international research network Study of the Astrophysics of Globular Clusters in Extragalactic Systems (SAGES), from which developed the SAGES Legacy Unifying Globulars and GalaxieS Survey. Its short name, the SLUGGS Survey, honours the banana slug which is the mascot of UCSC.

She is a collaborator on the Hubble Heritage Project and a member of the International Astronomical Union.

== Honors and awards ==
In 1990, Brodie was awarded a Guggenheim Fellowship in astronomy and astrophysics.
