= SAGES Legacy Unifying Globulars and GalaxieS Survey =

Astronomical survey

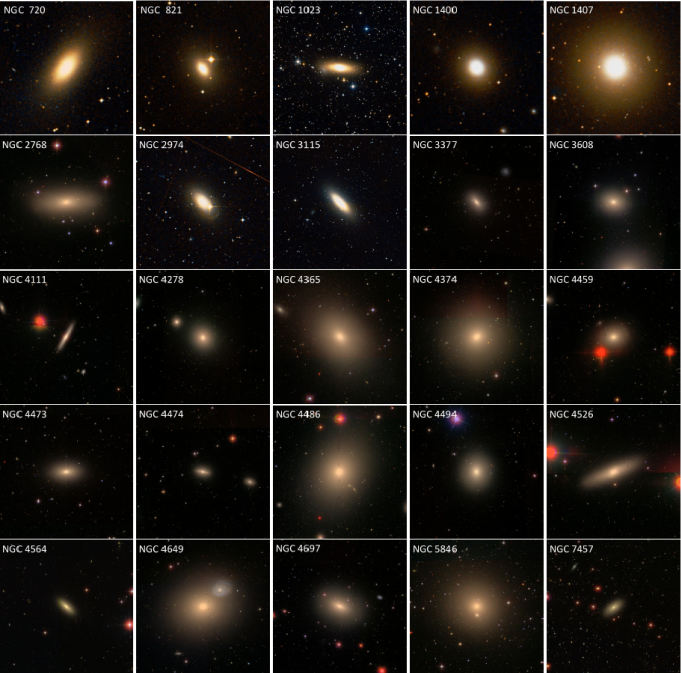
- Colour thumbnails of the 25 galaxies in the SLUGGS survey.
- Website: sluggs.swin.edu.au

The SLUGGS (SAGES Legacy Unifying Globulars and GalaxieS) survey is an astronomical survey of 25 (and 3 `bonus') nearby early-type (E and S0) galaxies. This survey uses a combination of imaging from Subaru/Suprime-Cam and spectroscopy from Keck/DEIMOS to investigate the chemo-dynamical properties of both the diffuse starlight and the globular cluster systems of the target galaxies. Pilot data for the survey was obtained in 2006 and data acquisition was completed in 2017.

The SLUGGS project was so named in honor of the banana slug mascot of the University of California, Santa Cruz.

== SAGES ==
SAGES (Study of the Astrophysics of Globular Clusters in Extragalactic Systems) is an international network of researchers investigating the formation and evolution of globular clusters and their host galaxies, using observational facilities around the world, particularly the Keck and Subaru telescopes. It was founded by Jean Brodie, Duncan Forbes, Aaron Romanowsky and Jay Strader.

== Method ==
Deep wide-field imaging from Subaru/Suprime-Cam is used to identify and measure the positions of candidate globular clusters around each survey galaxy. Several (up to 6) DEIMOS masks are then created which include slits corresponding to the locations of globular clusters, galaxy starlight and random background sky locations in the outer parts of the mask. The DEIMOS spectrograph, on the Keck telescope, is centred on wavelengths around the Calcium Triplet lines (~850 nm). After a typical 2 hour exposure per mask, spectra of globular clusters and galaxy starlight are obtained. Using a technique called SKiMS (Stellar Kinematics from Multiple Slits) it is possible to extract the kinematics (and metallicity) of galaxy starlight out to 3 effective radii. Equivalent data for the globular clusters is obtained out to ~10 effective radii. The DEIMOS instrument has the advantages of being a stable, high throughput, wide-field spectrograph coupled with excellent velocity resolution (~12 km/s) on a 10m telescope. This technique effectively uses DEIMOS as a pseudo wide area integral field unit.

== Survey selection ==
The 25 target galaxies are chosen to be representative (i.e. cover the range of basic galaxy parameters and environments) of nearby (distance < 27 Mpc) early type (E and S0) galaxies. The survey also includes 3 `bonus’ galaxies which have been observed during times that the main sample galaxies are not available. All galaxies are accessible from the northern hemisphere. Although only a small sample, the data reach to large galactocentric radii with excellent velocity resolution and S/N compared to other surveys.

== Key science questions ==
1. What are the basic, global chemo-dynamical properties of early type galaxies?
2. What is the distribution of dark matter in early-type galaxies?
3. How are the outer regions of early-type galaxies assembled?
4. How does assembly depend on mass, environment, and other variables?
5. Do the observations agree with theoretical models of galaxy formation?

== Target galaxies ==
NGC 720, NGC 821, NGC 1023, NGC 1400, NGC 1407, NGC 2768, NGC 2974, NGC 3115, NGC 3377, NGC 3608, NGC 4111, NGC 4278, NGC 4365, NGC 4374, NGC 4459, NGC 4473, NGC 4474, NGC 4486, NGC 4494, NGC 4526, NGC 4564, NGC 4649, NGC 4697, NGC 5846, NGC 7457.

The bonus galaxies are NGC 3607, NGC 4594 and NGC 5866.

== Notes ==
A complete list of publications using SLUGGS survey data can be found here.
