= Astronomical survey =

General map or image of a region of the sky with no specific observational target

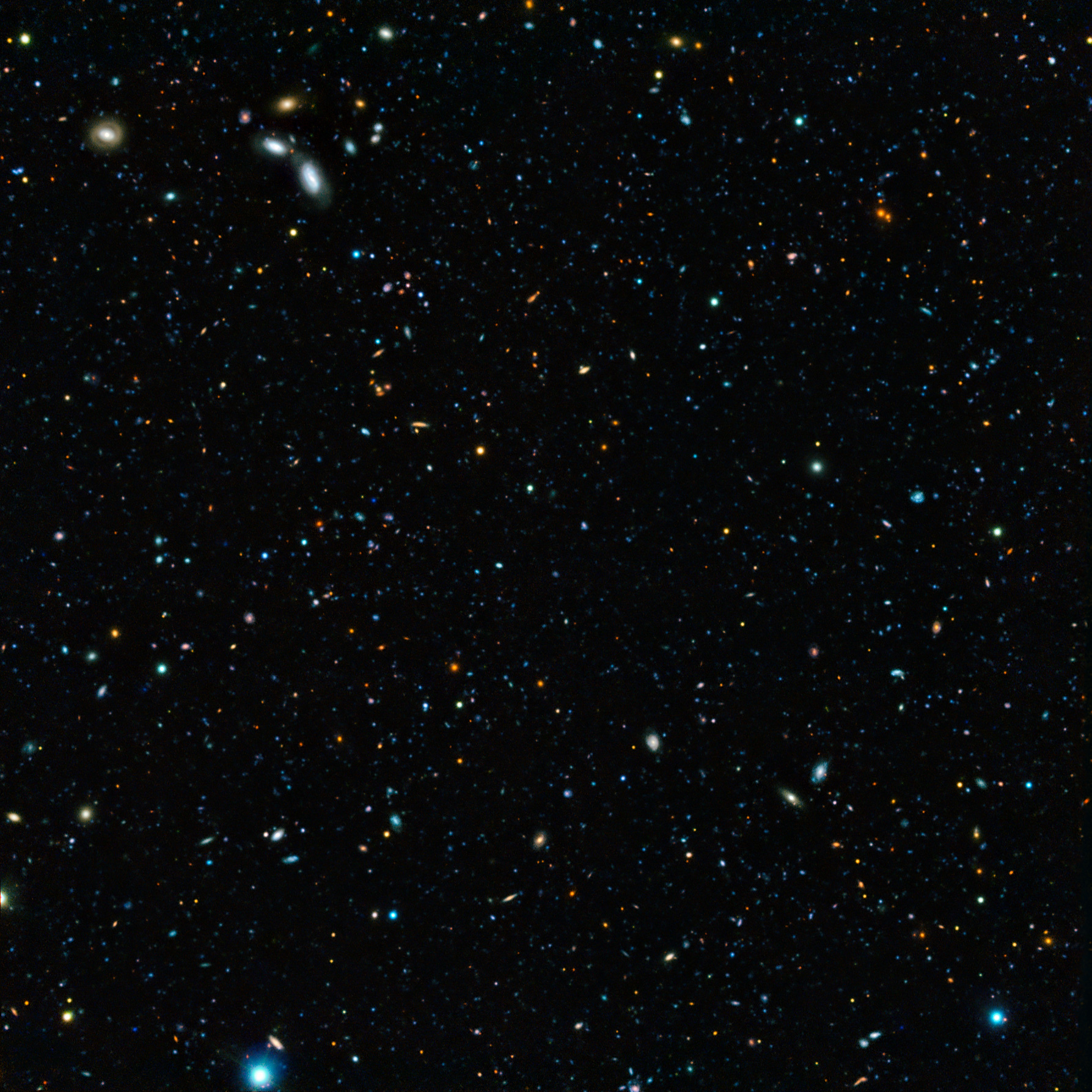
Composite image of the GOODS-South field, result of a deep survey using two of the four giant 8.2-metre telescopes composing ESO's Very Large Telescope

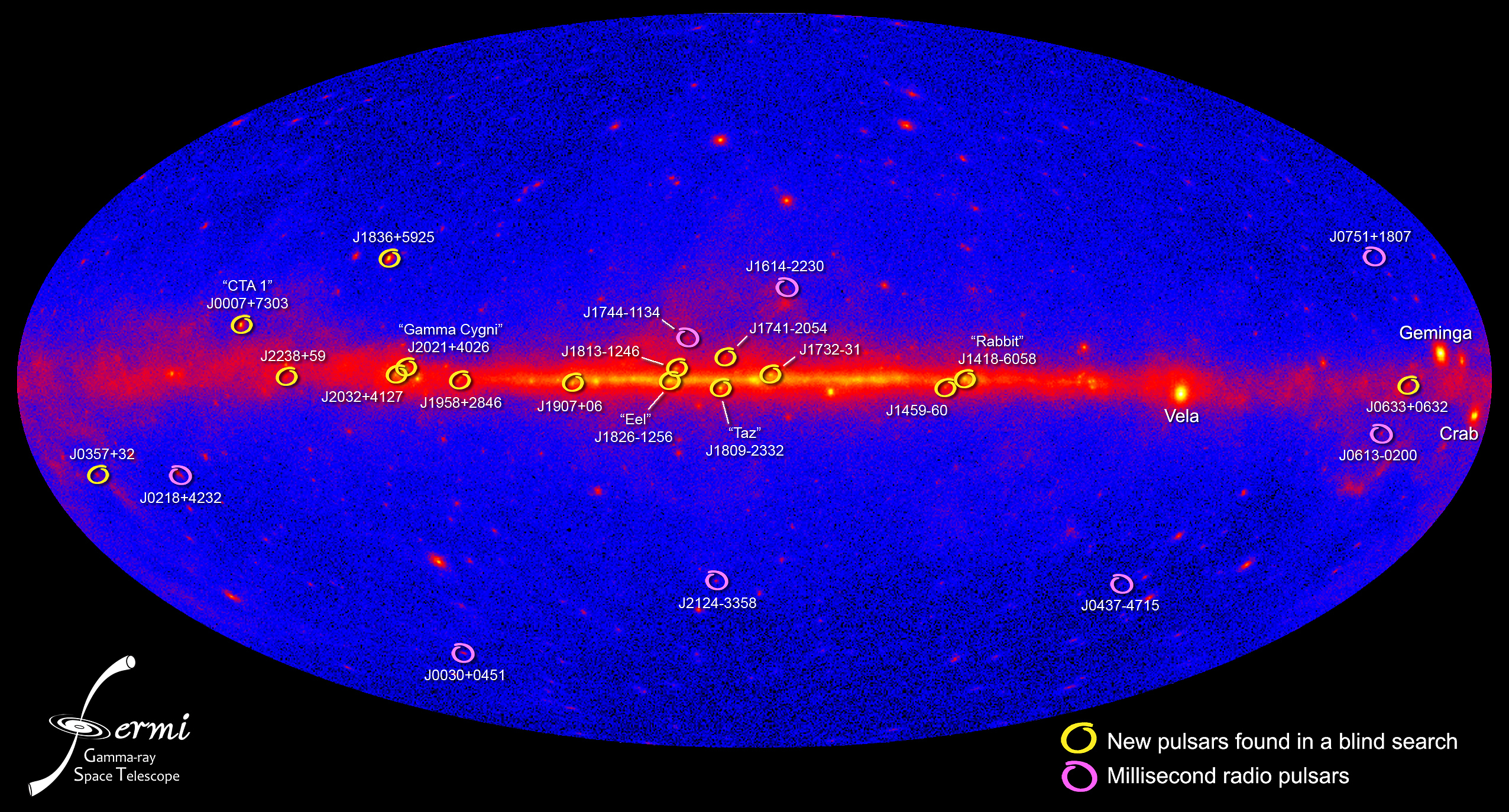
Gamma-ray pulsars detected by the Fermi Gamma-ray Space Telescope

An astronomical survey is a general map or image of a region of the sky (or of the whole sky) that lacks a specific observational target. Alternatively, an astronomical survey may comprise a set of images, spectra, or other observations of objects that share a common type or feature. Surveys are often restricted to one band of the electromagnetic spectrum due to instrumental limitations, although multiwavelength surveys can be made by using multiple detectors, each sensitive to a different bandwidth.

Surveys have generally been performed as part of the production of an astronomical catalog. They may also search for transient astronomical events. They often use wide-field astrographs.

== Scientific value ==
Sky surveys, unlike targeted observation of a specific object, allow astronomers to catalog celestial objects and perform statistical analyses on them without complex corrections for selection effects. In some cases, an astronomer interested in a particular object will find that survey images are sufficient to make new telescope time entirely unnecessary.

Surveys also help astronomers choose targets for closer study using larger, more powerful telescopes. If previous observations support a hypothesis, a telescope scheduling committee is more likely to approve new, more detailed observations to test it.

The wide scope of surveys makes them ideal for finding foreground objects that move, such as asteroids and comets. An astronomer can compare existing survey images to current observations to identify changes; this task can even be performed automatically using image analysis software.

Besides science, these surveys also detect potentially hazardous objects, providing a service to Spaceguard. For example, the Asteroid Terrestrial-impact Last Alert System (ATLAS) system surveys the entire night sky every night and, like NEOSTEL, is intended to detect objects as they approach. Broader surveys include the Uppsala–DLR Asteroid Survey and the 20th-century U.K. Schmidt–Caltech Asteroid Survey. Old surveys can be reviewed to find precovery images.

Similarly, images of the same object taken by different surveys can be compared to detect transient astronomical events such as variable stars.

== List of sky surveys ==
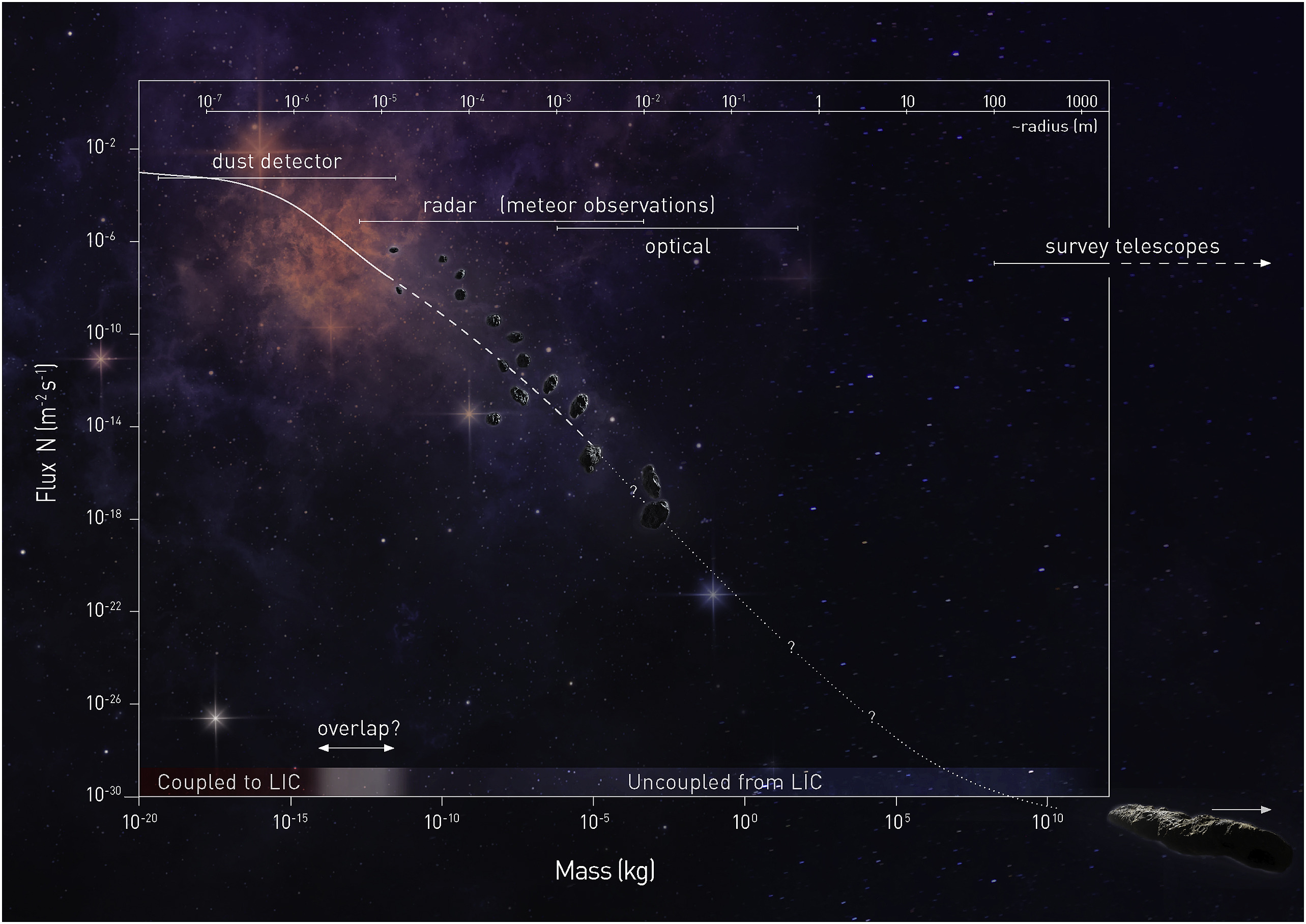
Spectrum of types of observations of Solar System objects.

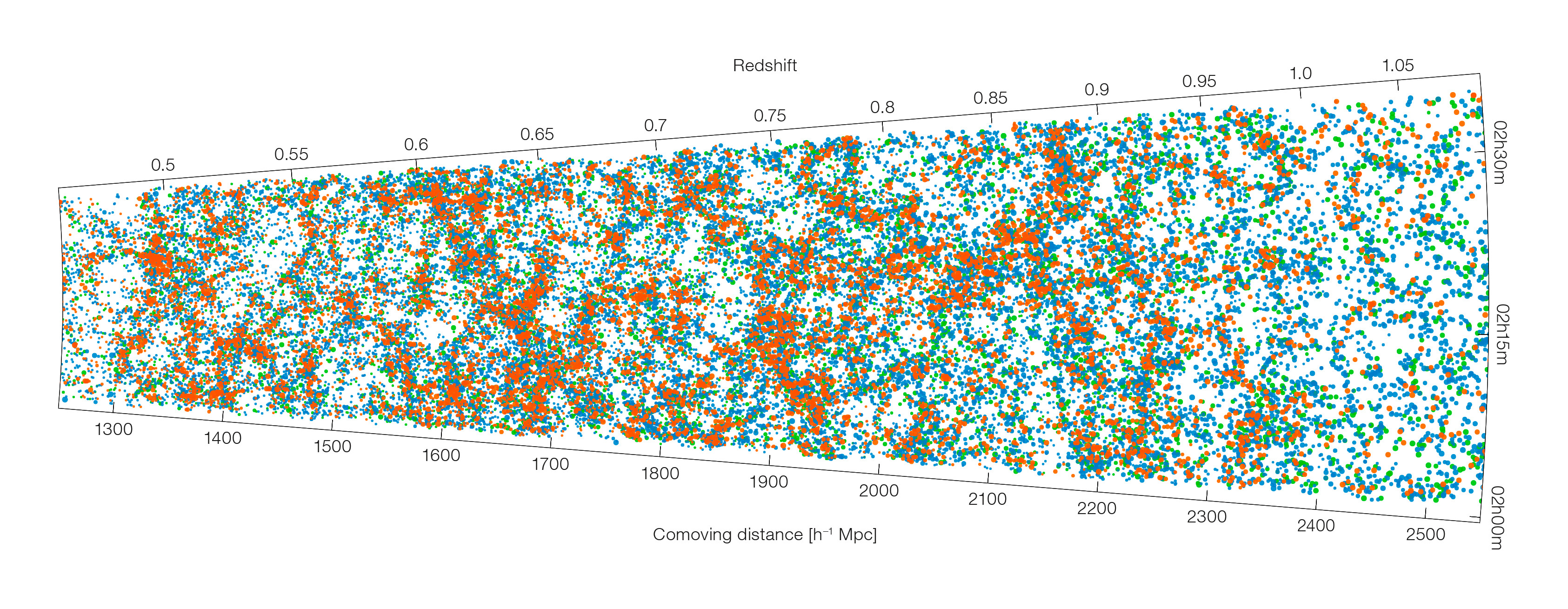
The positions in space of just some of the galaxies identified by the VIPERS survey (see Visible Multi Object Spectrograph).

- Optical
  - Hipparchus - created the first known star catalogue with more than 850 stars. The data was incorporated into the Almagest along with the first list of stellar magnitudes and was the primary astronomical reference until modern times, 190-120 BC.
  - Bonner Durchmusterung - whole-sky astrometric star catalog, 1859–1903
  - Astrographic Catalogue - international astronomical survey of the entire sky. The survey was performed by 18 observatories using over 22,000 photographic plates. The results have been the basis of comparison for all subsequent surveys, 1887–1975.
  - Henry Draper Catalogue - spectral classifications based on photographic plates, 1918–1924, extension 1925–1936
  - Catalina Sky Survey - an astronomical survey to discover comets and asteroids.
  - Pan-Andromeda Archaeological Survey
  - National Geographic Society – Palomar Observatory Sky Survey (NGS–POSS) – survey of the northern sky on photographic plates, 1948–1958
  - CfA Redshift Survey – A program from Harvard-Smithsonian Center for Astrophysics. It began in 1977 to 1982 then from 1985 to 1995.
  - Digitized Sky Survey – optical all-sky survey created from digitized photographic plates, 1994
  - 2dF Galaxy Redshift Survey (2dfGRS) – redshift survey conducted by the Anglo-Australian Observatory between 1997 and 2002
  - Sloan Digital Sky Survey (SDSS) – an optical and spectroscopic survey, 2000–2006 (first pass)
  - Photopic Sky Survey – a survey with 37,440 individual exposures, 2010–2011.
  - DEEP2 Redshift Survey (DEEP2) – Used Keck Telescopes to measure redshift of 50,000 galaxies
  - VIMOS-VLT Deep Survey (VVDS) – Franco-Italian study using the Very Large Telescope at Paranal Observatory
  - Palomar Distant Solar System Survey (PDSSS)
  - WiggleZ Dark Energy Survey (2006–2011) used the Australian Astronomical Observatory
  - Dark Energy Survey (DES) is a survey about one-tenth of the sky to find clues to the characteristics of dark energy.-
  - Calar Alto Legacy Integral Field Area Survey (CALIFA) – a spectroscopic survey of galaxies
  - SAGES Legacy Unifying Globulars and GalaxieS (SAGES Legacy Unifying Globulars and GalaxieS Survey (SLUGGS) survey – a near-infrared spectro-photometric survey of 25 nearby early-type galaxies (2014)
  - Large Sky Area Multi-Object Fiber Spectroscopic Telescope (LAMOST) – an extra-galactic and stellar spectroscopic survey
  - IPHAS and VPHAS+ – surveys of the Galactic bulge and inner disk using the Isaac Newton Telescope (north) and VLT Survey Telescope (south) in u, g, r, Hα, and i bands, 2003–present
  - Pan-STARRS – a large-field survey system to look for transient and variable sources. 2010–present
  - Optical Gravitational Lensing Experiment (OGLE) – large-scale variability sky survey (in I and V bands), 1992–present
  - DESI Legacy Imaging Surveys (Legacy Surveys) - large imaging survey of the extragalactic sky, in three bands and covering one third of the sky, 2013–present
  - GSNST - Global Supernovae Search Team - an all sky survey launched in August 2018 to look for Astronomical Transients
  - Gaia catalogues of over a billion parallax distances
  - Zwicky Transient Facility (ZTF) - a wide-field sky astronomical survey of the northern transient sky, 2018–present
  - Euclid (space telescope) - An optical and IR survey of 15,000 square degrees in the sky from space, 2023-present.
  - Vera C. Rubin Observatory
- Infrared
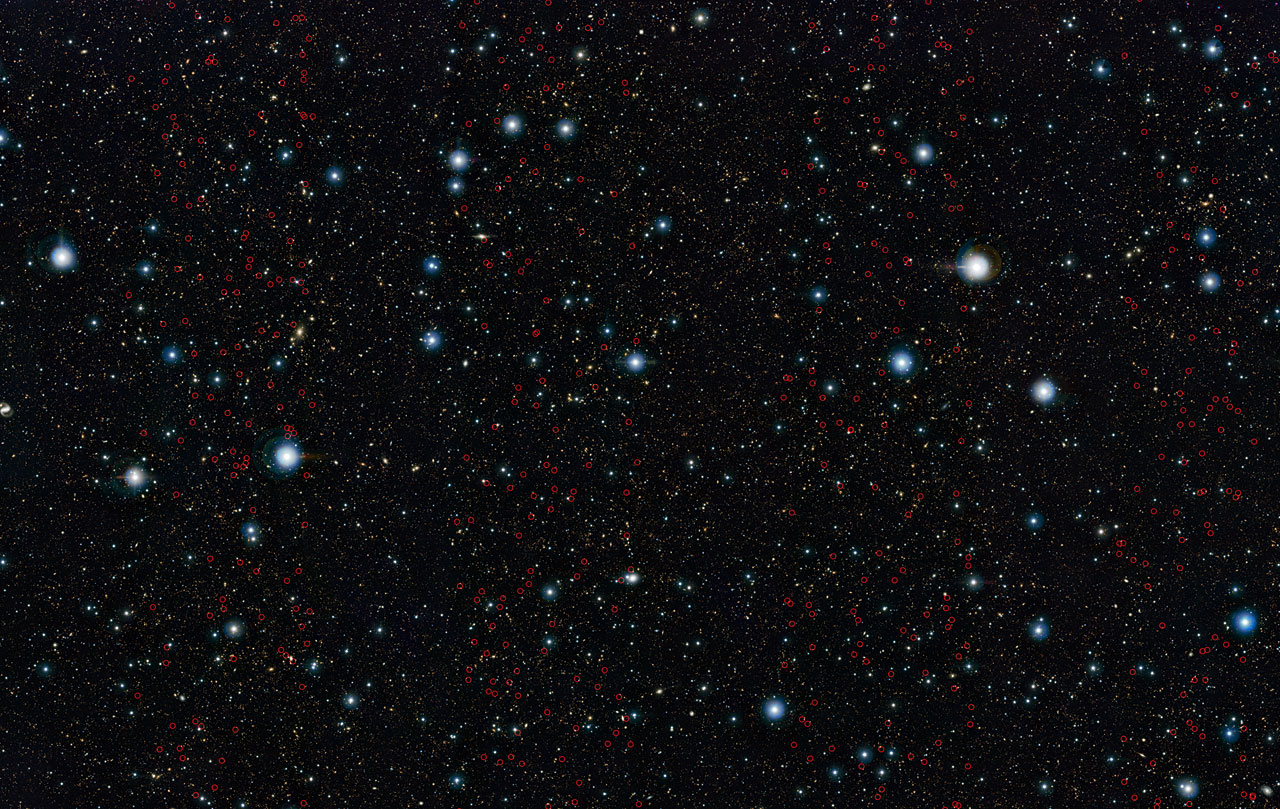
  Massive galaxies discovered in the early Universe of the UltraVISTA field.
  - Infrared Astronomical Satellite did an all sky survey at 12, 25, 60, and 100 μm, 1983
  - The 2-micron All-Sky Survey (2MASS), a ground-based all sky survey at J, H, and Ks bands (1.25, 1.65, and 2.17 μm) 1997–2001
  - Akari (Astro-F) a Japanese mid and far infrared all-sky survey satellite, 2006–2008
  - Wide-field Infrared Survey Explorer (WISE) was launched in December 2009 to begin a survey of 99% of the sky at wavelengths of 3.3, 4.7, 12, and 23 μm. The telescope is over a thousand times as sensitive as previous infrared surveys. The initial survey, consisting of each sky position imaged at least eight times, was completed by July 2010.
  - UKIRT Infrared Deep Sky Survey (UKIDSS) – a collection of ground based northern hemisphere surveys (GPS, GCS, LAS, DXS, UDS) using the WFCAM camera on UKIRT, some wide and some very deep, in Z, Y, J, H, & K bands 2005–
  - VISTA public surveys – a collection of ground based southern hemisphere surveys (VVV, VMC, VHS, VIKING, VIDEO, UltraVISTA), of various areas and depths, in Z, Y, J, H, & Ks bands, 2009–present
  - SCUBA-2 All Sky Survey
  - Euclid (space telescope) - An optical and IR survey of 15,000 square degrees in the sky from space, 2023-present.
  - Nancy Grace Roman Space Telescope to be launched in 2027
- Radio
  - Third Cambridge Catalogue of Radio Sources ("3C") - Survey at 159 and 178 MHz published in 1959
  - HIPASS – Radio survey, the first blind HI survey to cover the entire southern sky. 1997–2002
  - B2 — Bologna Sky Survey at 408 MHz (9929 radio sources) performed with the Northern Cross Radio Telescope
  - B3 — The New Bologna Sky Survey at 408 MHz (13354 radio sources) performed with the Northern Cross Radio Telescope
  - Ohio Sky Survey – Over 19,000 radio sources at 1415 MHz. 1965–1973.
  - NVSS – Survey at 1.4 GHz mapping the sky north of −40 deg
  - FIRST – Survey to look for faint radio sources at twenty cms.
  - SUMSS - Survey at 843 MHz, mapping the sky south of -30 deg with similar sensitivity and resolution to the northern NVSS
  - PALFA Survey – A 1.4 GHz survey for radio pulsars which used the Arecibo Observatory.
  - GALEX Arecibo SDSS Survey GASS designed to measure the neutral hydrogen content of a representative sample of ~1000 massive, galaxies
  - C-BASS – On-going 5 GHz all sky survey to aid in the subtraction of galactic foregrounds from maps of the Cosmic Microwave Background
  - EMU – A large radio continuum survey covering 3/4 of the sky, expected to discover about 70 million galaxies
  - GMRT - The Giant Metrewave Radio Telescope's TGSS ADR mapped the sky at 150 MHz.
  - HTRU – A pulsar and radio transients survey of the northern and southern sky using the Parkes Radio Telescope and the Effelsberg telescope.
- Gamma-ray
  - Fermi Gamma-ray Space Telescope, formerly referred to as the "Gamma-ray Large Area Space Telescope (GLAST)." 2008–present; the goal for the telescope's lifetime is 10 years.
- Multi-wavelength surveys
  - GAMA – the Galaxy And Mass Assembly survey combines data from a number of ground- and space-based observatories together with a large redshift survey, performed at the Anglo-Australian Telescope. The resulting dataset aims to be a comprehensive resource for studying the physics of the galaxy population and underlying mass structures in the recent universe.
  - GOODS – The Great Observatories Origins Deep Survey.
  - COSMOS – The Cosmic Evolution Survey
  - CANDELS - The Cosmic Assembly Near-infrared Deep Extragalactic Legacy Survey
  - (The latter three surveys are joining observations obtained from space with the Hubble Space Telescope, the Spitzer Space Telescope, the Chandra X-ray Observatory and the XMM-Newton satellite, with a large set of observations obtained with ground-based telescopes).
  - Atlas 3d Survey – sample of 260 galaxies for the Astrophysics project.
- Planned
  - Vera C. Rubin Observatory – a proposed very large telescope designed to repeatedly survey the whole sky that is visible from its location
  - Widefield ASKAP L-Band Legacy All-Sky Blind Survey (WALLABY)
  - NEO Surveyor - mid-infrared survey focused on near-Earth objects, with other objects also surveyed
  - Deep Synoptic Array - an under-construction survey telescope intended to survey the northern sky between 0.7 and 2 GHz.

=== Surveys of the Magellanic Clouds ===
- Catalogues of H-α emission stars and nebulae in the Magellanic Clouds - published 1956 (Astrophys. J. Suppl., 2, 315)
- MCELS (Magellanic Cloud Emission-line Survey)
- The Magellanic Clouds Photometric Survey – UBVI (optical)
- Deep Near Infrared Survey (DENIS) – near-IR

== See also ==
- See astronomical catalogue for a more detailed description of astronomical surveys and the production of astronomical catalogues
- Redshift surveys are astronomical surveys devoted to mapping the cosmos in three dimensions
- Category:astronomical catalogues—List of astronomical catalogues on Wikipedia
- Astrograph for a type of instrument used in Astronomical surveys.
- Timeline of astronomical maps, catalogs, and surveys
