= Multiwavelength Atlas of Galaxies =

Textbook and atlas of 35 well studied galaxies

The Multiwavelength Atlas of Galaxies is a textbook and atlas of 35 well studied galaxies (including our Galaxy) authored by Glen Mackie of the Centre for Astrophysics & Supercomputing, Swinburne University of Technology. It was originally published in 2011 by Cambridge University Press.

Optical image of NGC 5194/M 51. Obtained by HST/ACS/WFC in F435W, F555W, F658N, F814W.

== Atlas scope ==
The purpose of the atlas is to display and describe some of the best multiwavelength images of galaxies. The images originate from a variety of telescopes, instruments and detectors, and therefore possess wide ranges of signal-to-noise, angular resolution, sampling or pixel sizes and fields of view. The atlas is a compendium of galaxy images spanning the Gamma ray, X-ray, Ultraviolet, Optical, Infrared, Submillimeter and Radio regions of the electromagnetic spectrum.

The atlas has been favourably reviewed in the Royal Astronomical Society journal, Astronomy & Geophysics. Creating the atlas was a long term project ten years in the making. Background on the genesis of the atlas can be found in an interview with the author in the Swinburne University of Technology Venture magazine. It is recommended for graduate students and above.

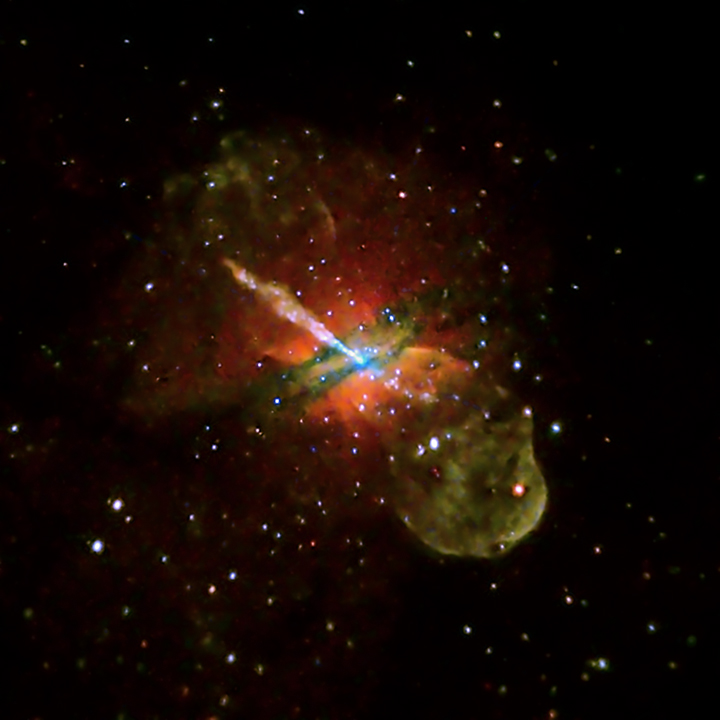
Centaurus A (NGC 5128 in the table below; Centaurus A is the radio source) is a nearby galaxy that contains a supermassive black hole actively powering a jet. A prominent X-ray jet extending for 13,000 light years points to the upper left in the image, with a shorter "counterjet" aimed in the opposite direction. In this image, low-energy X-rays are colored red, intermediate-energy X-rays are green, and the highest-energy X-rays detected by Chandra are blue. The dark green and blue bands running almost perpendicular to the jet are dust lanes that absorb X-rays.

Explanatory text describes how different radiation is produced, which objects (i.e. cold, warm or hot gas, dust, stars, particles, atoms and molecules) it originates from, and what types of telescopes are used to detect it. The galaxies are divided into categories of Normal (N), Interacting (I), Merging (M), Starburst (S) and Active (A), though many have been classified across one or more categories. The reasons for inclusion of a galaxy into a specific category is explained in the individual galaxy summaries in the Atlas.

== Galaxy types ==
Normal galaxies include galaxies that appear morphologically normal, do not possess unusual star formation rates, and have continuum spectra with a thermal (stellar) form characterized by one or more temperatures. Twelve N classified galaxies are in the Atlas.

Interacting galaxies display morphological signatures of a gravitational interaction with another nearby galaxy or are influenced by the passage through a dense medium that can 'strip out' constituent gas. Four I classified galaxies are in the Atlas.

Merging galaxies are the later evolutionary stages of two or more Interacting galaxies that have orbits and dynamics conducive to a final merger. Five M classified galaxies are in the Atlas.

Starburst galaxies undergo intense star formation that is well in excess of normal rates. Large numbers of young stars (O and B spectral type) exist and the dust content can be extremely high. Three S classified galaxies are in the Atlas.

Active galaxies have Active Galactic Nuclei (AGN) and include LINER, Seyfert, Radio Galaxy, Quasar and Blazar types. 'Activity' refers to non-stellar processes occurring or originating in a galaxy nucleus. An active nucleus has a spectrum with a continuum that cannot be explained by radiation from one or more stellar (or blackbody) objects. Eleven A classified galaxies are in the Atlas. Active galaxies typically have strong emission over a large portion of the electromagnetic spectrum making them prime targets for multiwavelength observations. Hence galaxies categorised Active make up a large fraction (31%) of the Atlas sample, and comprise 43% of the total sample if other Atlas galaxies with activity as a sub-category are included.

The Large Magellanic Cloud as imaged by the NASA Spitzer Space Telescope. The image is a composite of infrared light at wavelengths of 3.6 (blue), 8 (green) and 24 (red) μm.

Radiation from all regions of the electromagnetic spectrum has now been detected from galaxies. These observations have utilized telescopes at ground-based observatories (many located at high altitude mountain sites), telescopes in aircraft (≥10 km altitude), detectors on balloons that voyaged to the upper atmosphere (30–40 km altitude), instrument payloads on rockets that reached space, observatory satellites in Earth and Solar orbit as well as instruments aboard planetary missions journeying through the Solar System.

=== List of galaxies in the Multiwavelength Atlas of Galaxies ===
Category/Galaxy	Group/Cluster	R.A. (1950)	Dec. (1950)	Type	v_{0} (km s^{−1})	Dist. (Mpc)	Other cat.
Normal							
The Galaxy	LG	17 42 29	-28 59 18	[Sbc/SBbc]		8.5E-3	I, A?
NGC 224/M 31	LG	00 40 00	40 59 42	SbI-II	-10	0.7	
SMC	LG	00 50 53	-73 04 18	ImIV-V	-19	0.07	I
NGC 300	Sth. Polar	00 52 31	-37 57 24	ScII.8	128	1.2	
NGC 598/M 33	LG	01 31 03	30 23 54	Sc(s)II-III	69	0.7	
NGC 891	NGC 1023 Grp.	02 19 25	42 07 12	Sb on edge	779	9.6	
NGC 1399	Fornax Cl.	03 36 35	-35 36 42	E1	1375	16.9	
LMC	LG	05 24 00	-69 48	SBmIII	34	0.05	I
NGC 2915		09 26 31	-76 24 30	[BCD]	468	3.3	
Malin 2		10 37 10	21 06 29	[LSB]	13820	141	
NGC 5457/M101	M 101 Grp.	14 01 28	54 35 36	Sc(s)I	372	5.4	I?
NGC 6822	LG	19 42 07	-14 55 42	ImIV-V	15	0.7	
Interacting							
NGC 4406/M 86	Virgo Cl.	12 23 40	13 13 24	S0_{1}(3)/E3	-367	16.8	
NGC 4472/M 49	Virgo Cl.	12 27 17	08 16 42	E1/S0_{1}(1)	822	16.8	
NGC 4676		12 43 44	31 00 12		[0.022]	87.0	
NGC 5194/M 51		13 27 46	47 27 18	Sbc(s)I-II	541	7.7	A
Merging							
NGC 520		01 22 00	03 31 54	Amorphous	2350	27.8	
NGC 1275	Pers. Cl./Abell 426	03 16 30	41 19 48	E pec	5433	72.4	A
NGC 1316	Fornax Cl.	03 20 47	-37 23 06	Sa pec (merger?)	1713	16.9	A
NGC 4038/9		11 59 19	-18 35 06	Sc pec	1391	25.5	
NGC 7252		22 17 58	-24 55 54	merger	4759	63.5	
Starburst							
NGC 253	Sth. Polar Grp.	00 45 08	-25 33 42	Sc(s)	293	3.0	
NGC 3034/M 82	M 81 Grp.	09 51 41	69 54 54	Amorphous	409	5.2	I
NGC 5236/M 83		13 34 10	-29 36 48	SBc(s)II	275	4.7	I?
Active							
NGC 1068/M 77		02 40 07	-00 13 30	Sb(rs)II	1234	14.4	
NGC 1365	Fornax Cl.	03 31 42	-36 18 18	SBb(s)I	1562	16.9	
NGC 3031/M 81	M 81 Grp.	09 51 30	69 18 18	Sb(r)I-II	124	1.4	I
NGC 4258/M 106		12 16 29	47 35 00	Sb(s)II	520	6.8	
3C 273		12 26 33	02 19 43		[0.16]	589.0	
NGC 4486/M 87	Virgo Cl.	12 28 17	12 40 06	E0	1136	16.8	
NGC 4594/M 104		12 37 23	-11 21 00	Sa^{+}/Sb^{−}	873	20.0	
NGC 5128	N5128 Grp.	13 22 32	-42 45 30	S0+S pec	251	4.9	I
A1795^{#}1	Abell 1795	13 46 34	26 50 25		[0.063]	243.9	I
Arp 220		15 32 47	23 40 08		[0.018]	71.3	S, M
Cygnus A		19 57 44	40 35 46		[0.057]	221.4	

Notes to Table:

Group/Cluster: LG: Local Group; Sth. Polar Grp.: South Polar Group, also known as the Sculptor Group; Pers. Cl.: Perseus Cluster.

Right Ascension and Declination: From a Revised Shapley-Ames Catalog of Bright Galaxies (RSA; Sandage and Tammann 1981), when available, or else from the SIMBAD astronomical database except for the Galaxy (coordinates of Sagittarius A*, from Mezger et al. 1996).

Type: Where possible galaxy types are taken from RSA. This classification scheme is the revised Hubble system (Sandage 1961, 1975). The exceptions, NGC 2915 (Blue Compact Dwarf, BCD, Meurer, Mackie and Carignan 1994); the Galaxy (Sbc/SBbc, de Vaucouleurs 1970); Malin 2 (Low Surface Brightness, LSB, McGaugh and Bothun 1994) are indicated with types given in [ ].

v_{0}: The corrected recession velocity relative to the Local Group centroid, in km s^{−1} from RSA. Redshifts (z) are given in [ ] when v_{0} is not listed in RSA. Velocities for NGC 2915 and Malin 2 are from the NASA/IPAC Extragalactic Database (NED) and are heliocentric.

Distance: In Mpc from Tully (1988), except for the Galaxy (Mezger et al. 1996); LMC (50 kpc. Note: Panagia et al. 1991; distance to SN 1987A, D(1987A) = 51.2±3.1 kpc); SMC (Rowan-Robinson 1985); Malin 2 (McGaugh and Bothun 1994); NGC 1275 and NGC 7252 (where D = v_{0}/75.0 Mpc); and NGC 4676, 3C 273, A1795^{#1}, Arp 220, Cygnus A (where D = v/75.0 Mpc, and v = c [(z+1)^{2} - 1]/[(z+1)^{2} + 1]

Other Categories: N - Normal, I - Interacting, M - Merging, S - Starburst, A - Active.

References for Table:

McGaugh, S.S., and Bothun, G.D. 1994, A. J., 107, 530. Mezger, P.G., Duschl, W.J. and Zylka, R. 1996, Astron. Ap. Review, 7, 289. Panagia, N. et al. 1991, Ap. J., 380, L23. Rowan-Robinson, M. 1985, 'The Cosmological Distance Ladder', (New York: Freeman). p. 153. Sandage, A. and Tammann, G. A. 1981, A Revised Shapley-Ames Catalog of Bright Galaxies, (Carnegie Institute of Washington, Washington, D.C.) (RSA) Tully, R.B. 1988, Nearby Galaxies Catalog, (Cambridge University Press, Cambridge).

== See also ==
- Messier object (M)
- New General Catalogue (NGC)
- Atlas of Peculiar Galaxies (Arp)
