= U.K. Schmidt–Caltech Asteroid Survey =

U.K. Schmidt–Caltech Asteroid Survey, or U.K. Schmidt Telescope–Caltech asteroid survey, or UCAS is the joint astronomical survey performed in 1982. This survey no longer exists as a separate entity, but is rather integrated into astorb asteroids database. The UCAS catalog data format is plain text, after uncompressing by unzip or gunzip it can be seen by any text viewers or by online ADC viewer. Specifications for catalog format are provided on the download sites.

== Database download locations ==
- Download page for asteroids database, including UCAS database, 2001
- Download page for asteroids database, including UCAS database, 1998
- Caltech asteroids database, including UCAS database, 1996

== See also ==
- UK Schmidt Telescope
- Schmidt telescope
