= Magellanic Cloud Emission-line Survey =

Scientific survey of Magellanic Clouds

The Magellanic Cloud Emission Line Survey (MCELS) is a joint project of Cerro Tololo Inter-American Observatory (Chile) and the University of Michigan using the CTIO Curtis/Schmidt Telescope. The main goal of the project is to trace the ionized gas in the Magellanic Clouds using narrow-band filters ([S II], Hα and [O III]) and investigate the physical properties of the interstellar medium of these galaxies. Those emission lines are produced by different astrophysical objects and processes.
