= NGC 4513 =

Galaxy in the constellation Draco

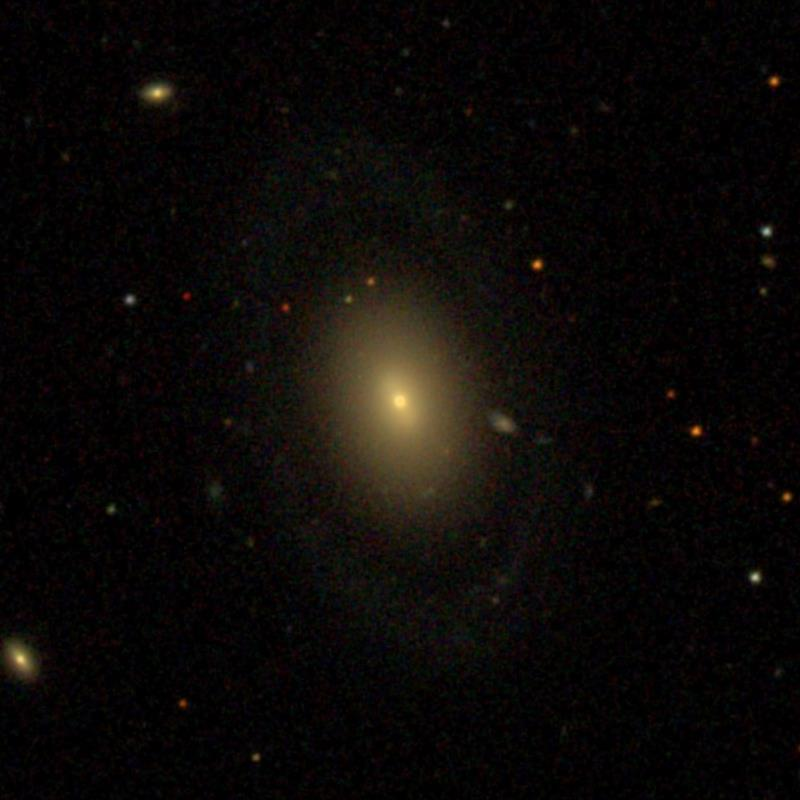
- SDSS image of NGC 4513.

Observation data (J2000 epoch)
- Constellation: Draco
- Right ascension: 12^{h} 32^{m} 01.5^{s}
- Declination: 66° 19′ 57″
- Redshift: 0.007685
- Heliocentric radial velocity: 2304 km/s
- Distance: 110 Mly (33 Mpc)
- Group or cluster: NGC 4256 Group
- Apparent magnitude (V): 13.7

Characteristics
- Type: (R)SA0^0
- Size: ~55,000 ly (17 kpc) (estimated)
- Apparent size (V): 1.21 x 0.88

Other designations
- CGCG 315-42, MCG 11-15-59, PGC 41527, UGC 7683

NGC 4513 is a lenticular galaxy and a ring galaxy located about 110 million light-years away in the constellation Draco. It was discovered by astronomer Heinrich d'Arrest on October 16, 1866.

== Physical characteristics ==
NGC 4513 has a large and very faint ring that is quite separated from the main galactic disk. The disk is gaseous and counter-rotates with respect to the inner disc. The outer part of the inner disc exhibits a population of counter-rotating stars that may be related to the outer ring. The observed counter-rotation suggests that the ring resulted from the accretion of gas from the passage of another galaxy. However, Ilyina et al. proposed that the ring is the result of a satellite galaxy vertically impacting onto the central part of NGC 4513 as the ring is bright in UV and is symmetric.

== Group Membership ==
NGC 4513 is a member of the NGC 4256 Group which lies in the upper plane of the Virgo Supercluster.

== See also ==
- List of NGC objects (4001–5000)
- Hoags Object
- NGC 6028
