= Abell 1795 =

Galaxy cluster in the constellation of Boötes

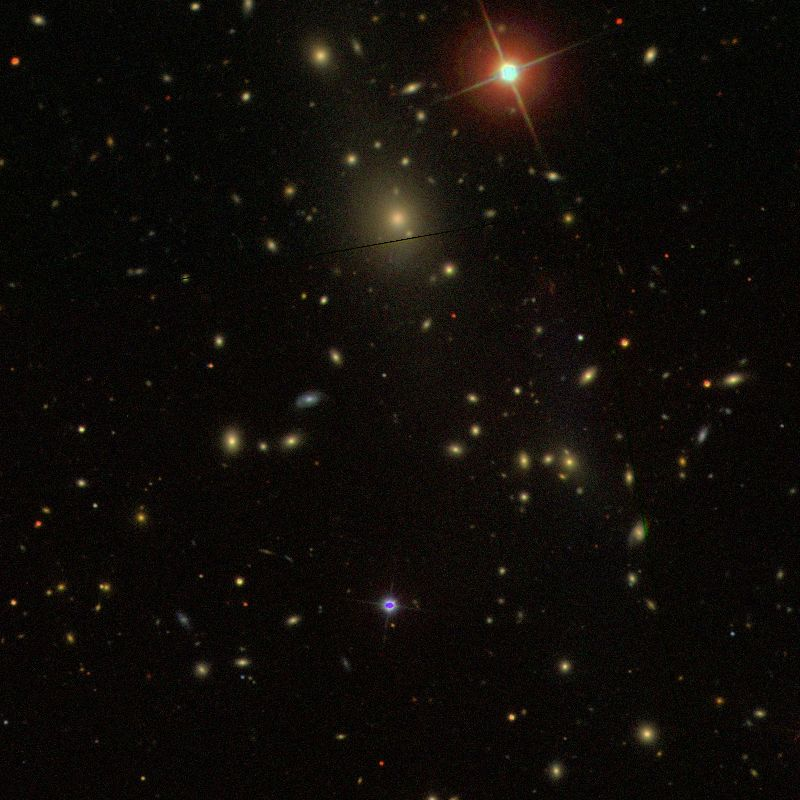

Observation data (Epoch J2000)
- Constellation: Boötes
- Right ascension: 13^{h} 49^{m} 00.5^{s}
- Declination: +26° 35′ 07″
- Richness class: 2
- Bautz–Morgan classification: I
- Redshift: 0.062476 (18 730)
- Distance: 266 Mpc (868 Mly) h^{−1}_{0.705}
- ICM temperature: 6.12 keV
- Binding mass: 6.03×10^{14} M_{☉}
- X-ray flux: (68.10 ± 5.8%)×10^{−12} erg s^{−1} cm^{−2} (0.1–2.4 keV)

Abell 1795 is a galaxy cluster in the Abell catalogue.

== Black holes ==
In January 2014, scientists using data collected by the Chandra X-Ray Observatory and other telescopes reported they had found evidence of a new supermassive black hole candidate disrupting a star in a dwarf galaxy in the Abell 1795 cluster.

== See also ==
- Abell catalogue
- List of Abell clusters
