= Calcium triplet =

Three ionised calcium spectral lines at 8498, 8542, and 8662 Å

The infrared Ca II triplet, commonly known as the calcium triplet, is a set of three ionized calcium spectral lines at the wavelengths of 8498 Å, 8542 Å and 8662 Å (measured in air). The triplet is most often observed in absorption in the spectra of stars of spectral type G, K and M. Some Be stars, which are hot stars with hydrogen emission lines, show the calcium triplet in emission. The emission seems to come from peculiar properties of the gas disk that surrounds the star and produces the hydrogen emission lines.

== See also ==
- Fraunhofer lines
- Infrared spectroscopy
