= NGC 4697 =

Elliptical galaxy in the constellation Virgo

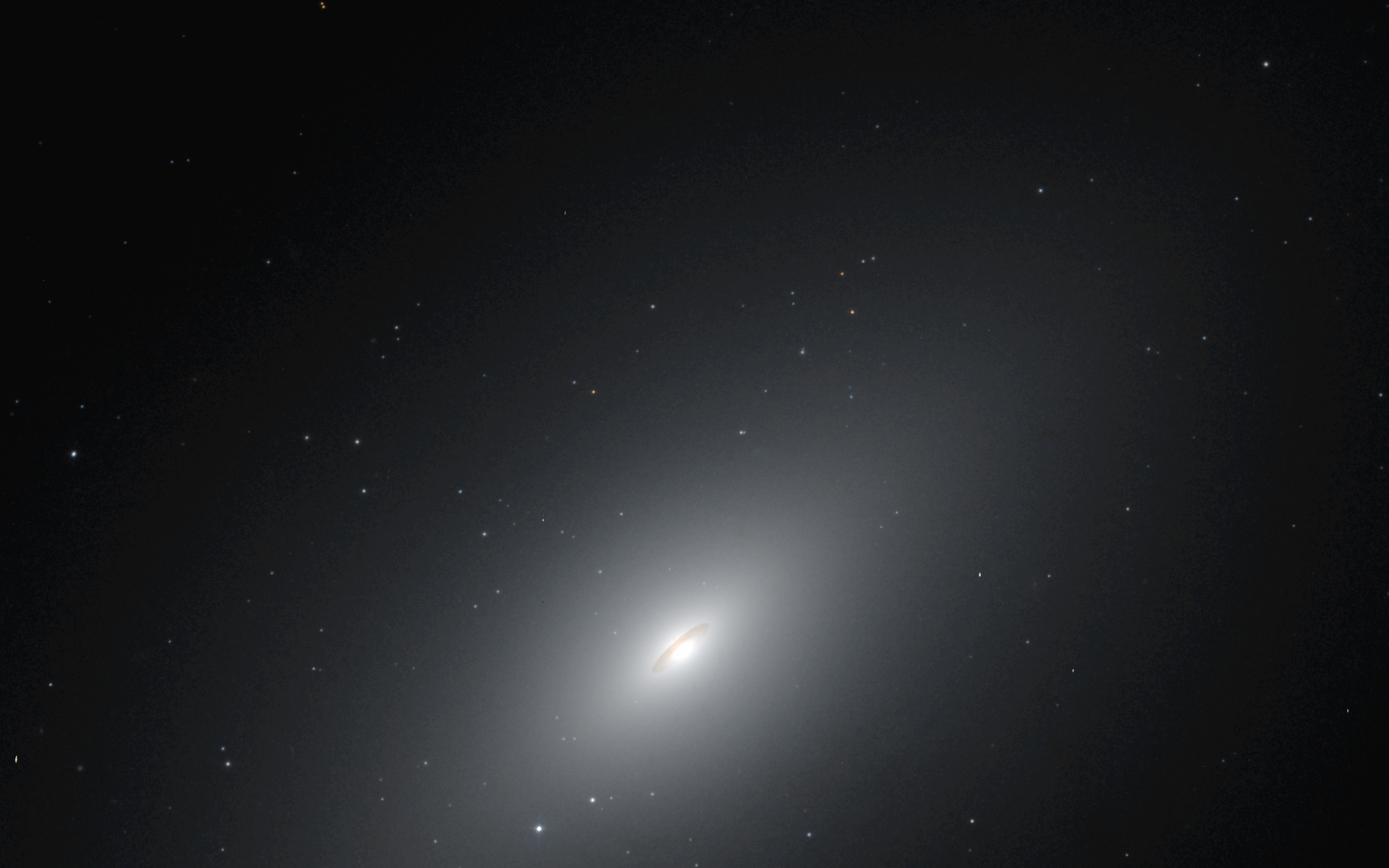
- NGC 4697 imaged by the Hubble Space Telescope

Observation data (J2000 epoch)
- Constellation: Virgo
- Right ascension: 12^{h} 48^{m} 35.9^{s}
- Declination: −05° 48′ 03″
- Redshift: 1241 ± 1 km/s
- Distance: ~ 38 Mly / ~ 50 Mly
- Apparent magnitude (V): 10.97

Characteristics
- Type: E6
- Apparent size (V): 4.4′ × 2.8′

Other designations
- Caldwell 52, UGCA 300, MCG -01-33-010, PGC 043276

NGC 4697 (also known as Caldwell 52) is an elliptical galaxy some 40 to 50 million light-years away in the constellation Virgo. It was discovered by German-British astronomer William Herschel on 24 April 1784.

It is a member of the NGC 4697 Group, a group of galaxies also containing NGC 4731 and several generally much smaller galaxies. This group is about 55 million light-years away; it is one of the many Virgo II Groups, which form a southern extension of the Virgo Supercluster of galaxies.

The distance to NGC 4697 is not known with high precision: measurements vary from 28 to 76 million light-years. According to the NASA Extra-galactic Database, the average is about 38 million light-years; according to SIMBAD, about 50 million light-years.

The supermassive black hole at the core of NGC 4697 has a mass of 1.3+0.18
−0.17×10^{8} M_{☉} as measured from Atacama Large Millimeter Array observations of the rotation of the central gas disk.

On 2 April 1950, it was occulted by the Moon during a total lunar eclipse over the Iberian Peninsula, Africa, Madagascar, Arabia and the Indian Ocean. This happened again under the same conditions on the April 1996 lunar eclipse over the same locations, and again during the April 2015 lunar eclipse over extreme NE Siberia and North America. It will next happen on 4 April 2080 over the Pacific Ocean including Hawaii.

== Supernova ==
One supernova has been observed in NGC 4697:

- SN 2018imd (Type Ia, mag. 15.5) was discovered by Kōichi Itagaki on 14 November 2018.

== Gallery ==
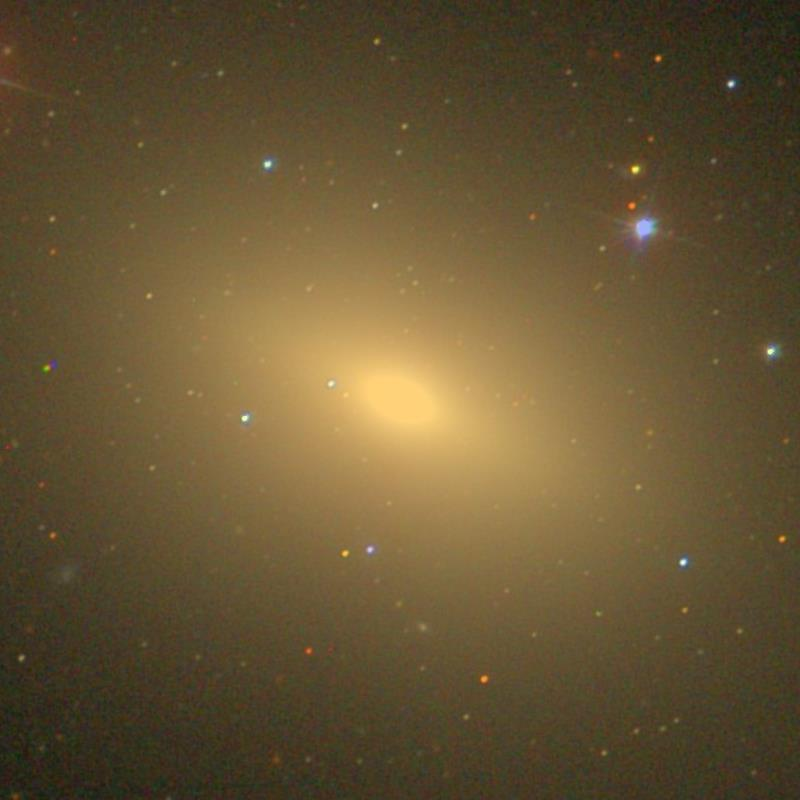
NGC 4697 by the Sloan Digital Sky Survey

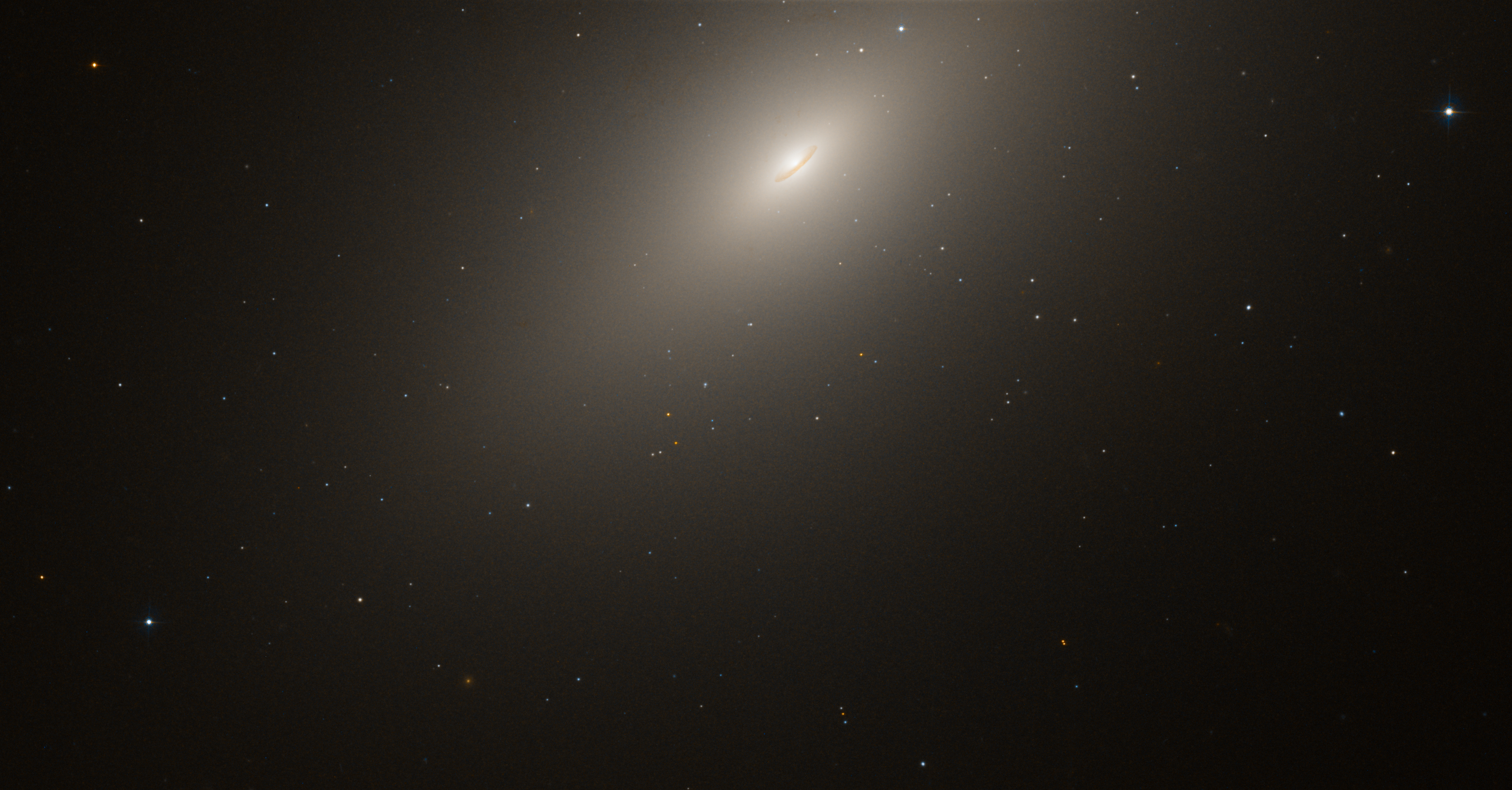
NGC 4697 from the Hubble Space Telescope.
