= NGC 4731 =

Galaxy

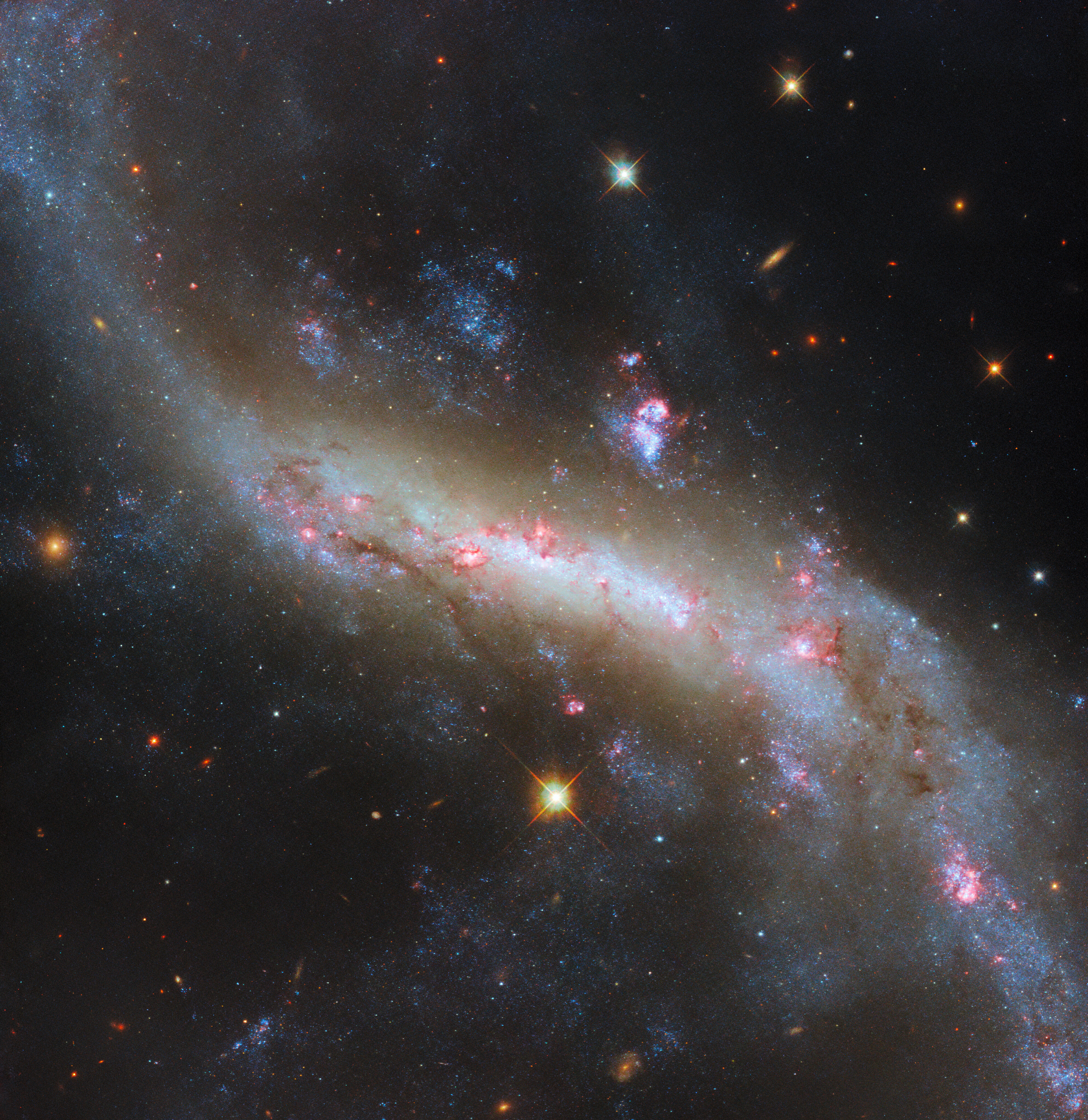
- NGC 4731 (Hubble)

Observation data (J2000 epoch)
- Constellation: Virgo
- Right ascension: 12^{h} 51^{m} 01.095^{s}
- Declination: −06° 23′ 34.98″
- Heliocentric radial velocity: 1488.6 km/s
- Distance: 43 Mly
- Apparent magnitude (B): 12

Characteristics
- Type: SBc

Other designations
- UGCA 302, MCG -01-33-026, PGC 43507

NGC 4731 is a barred spiral galaxy located near the Virgo Supercluster. To its celestial south lies NGC 4731A, a small irregular galaxy. Both galaxies feature high concentrations of neutral HI gas. It is theorized that its elongated arm structure could be related to gravitational interactions with a nearby galaxy, NGC 4967. It is a member of the NGC 4697 Group of galaxies, which is a member of the Virgo II Groups, a series of galaxies and galaxy clusters strung out from the southern edge of the Virgo Supercluster.

On 2 April 1950 (the April 1950 lunar eclipse) it was occulted by the Moon during a Total Lunar Eclipse over Europe except the N and NE, Africa, Madagascar and the Indian Ocean. It happened again under those same conditions during the April 1996 lunar eclipse over the North Atlantic, Europe, N and NE Africa and Southwest Asia. It will next happen on 4 April 2080 over NE Siberia, NW North America, and the Pacific Ocean including Hawaii.

== Gallery ==
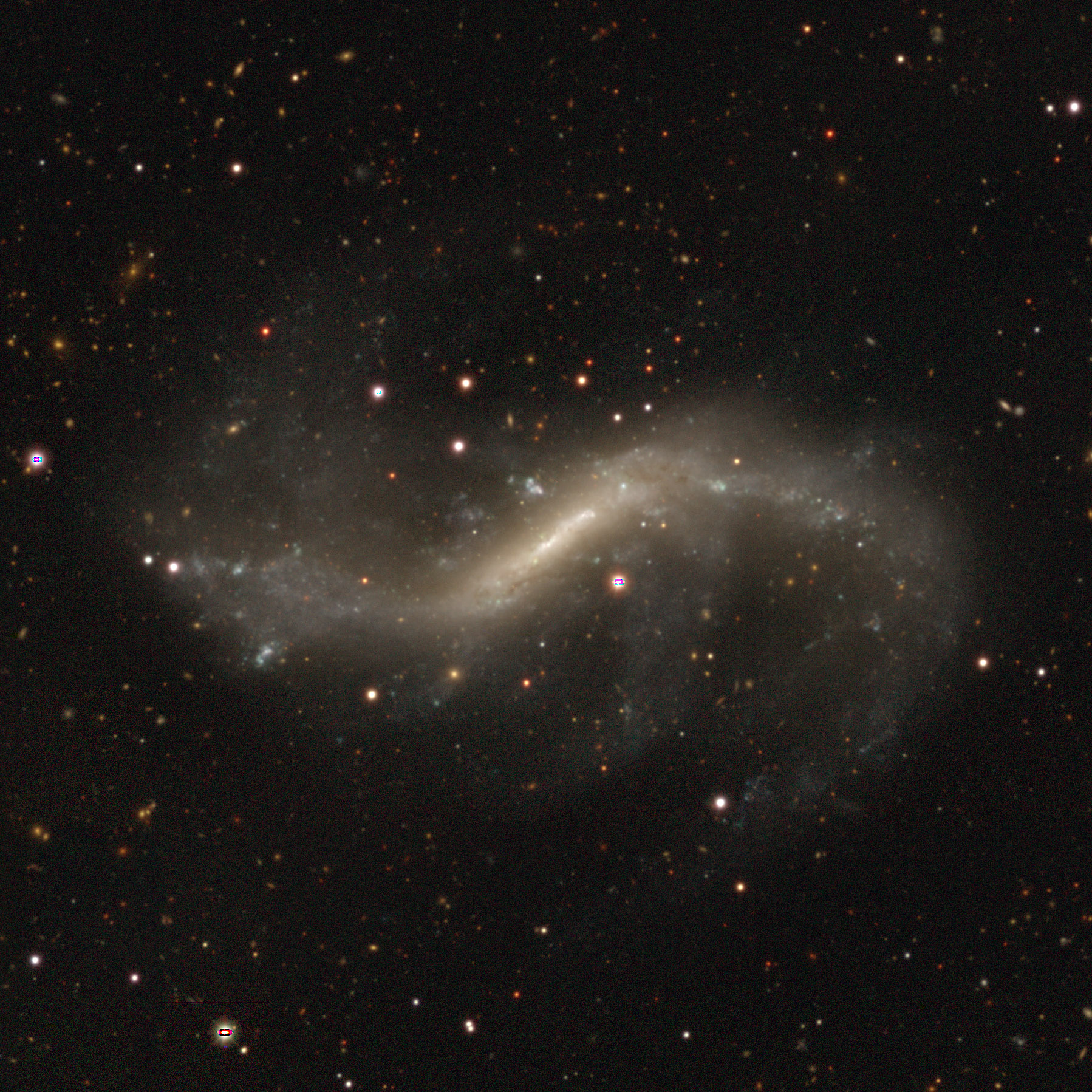
NGC 4731 with legacy surveys

== See also ==
New General Catalogue
