= NGC 4062 =

Galaxy in the constellation Ursa Major

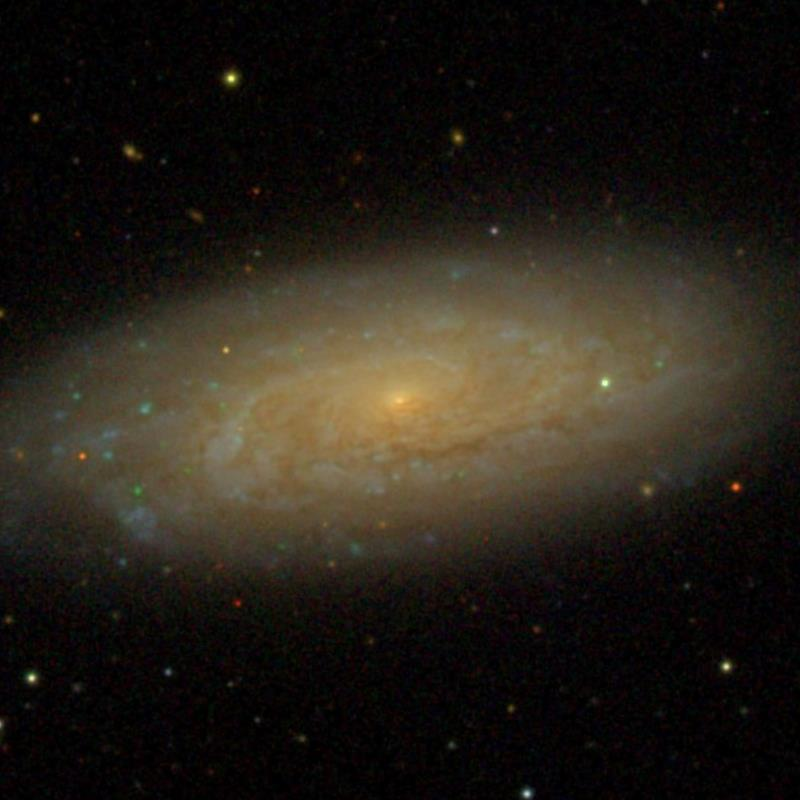
- NGC 4062 imaged by Sloan Digital Sky Survey

Observation data (J2000 epoch)
- Constellation: Ursa Major
- Right ascension: 12^{h} 04^{m} 03.7915^{s}
- Declination: +31° 53′ 44.765″
- Redshift: 0.002528 ± 0.000003
- Heliocentric radial velocity: 758 ± 1 km/s
- Distance: 49.1 ± 9.0 Mly (15.0 ± 2.8 Mpc)
- Group or cluster: Coma I Group
- Apparent magnitude (V): 11.2

Characteristics
- Type: SA(s)c
- Size: ~52,000 ly (16 kpc) (estimated)
- Apparent size (V): 4.0′ × 1.8′

Other designations
- IRAS 12015+3210, UGC 7045, MCG +05-29-004, PGC 38150, CGCG 158-008

NGC 4062 is a spiral galaxy in the constellation Ursa Major. The galaxy lies about 50 million light years away from Earth, which means, given its apparent dimensions, that NGC 4062 is approximately 50,000 light years across. It was discovered by William Herschel on March 20, 1787.

== Characteristics ==
NGC 4062 has a small elliptical bulge. From the minor axis of the bulge emerge two spiral arms, better visible in near-infrared. The arms are high-contrast and in a grand design pattern. The arms are initially smooth and narrow but after half a revolution become diffuse. They can be traced for a full revolution before fading. Dust lanes can be seen across the disk in a spiral pattern. Some HII regions are also visible, but are less than two arcseconds across. The star formation knots appear patchy, in a flocculent pattern.

The galaxy is a strong source of H-alpha emission, whose kinematics in the central region indicate high velocity dispersion, maybe due to the presence of a bar. In the centre of the galaxy lies a supermassive black hole whose mass is estimated to be 10^{6.7} M_{☉} (5 million times more massive than the Sun) based on the spheroid luminosity.

== Nearby galaxies ==
NGC 4062 is a member of the NGC 4274 Group (also known as LGG 279) which has at least 19 galaxies, including NGC 4020, NGC 4136, NGC 4173, NGC 4203, NGC 4245, NGC 4251, NGC 4274, NGC 4278, NGC 4283, NGC 4310, NGC 4314, NGC 4359, NGC 4414, NGC 4509, NGC 4525, UGC 7300, and MCG +05-29-066. Makarov considers the galaxy to be a member of the NGC 4062 Group, which also includes NGC 4020, IC 2984, and UGC 7007.

== Gallery ==
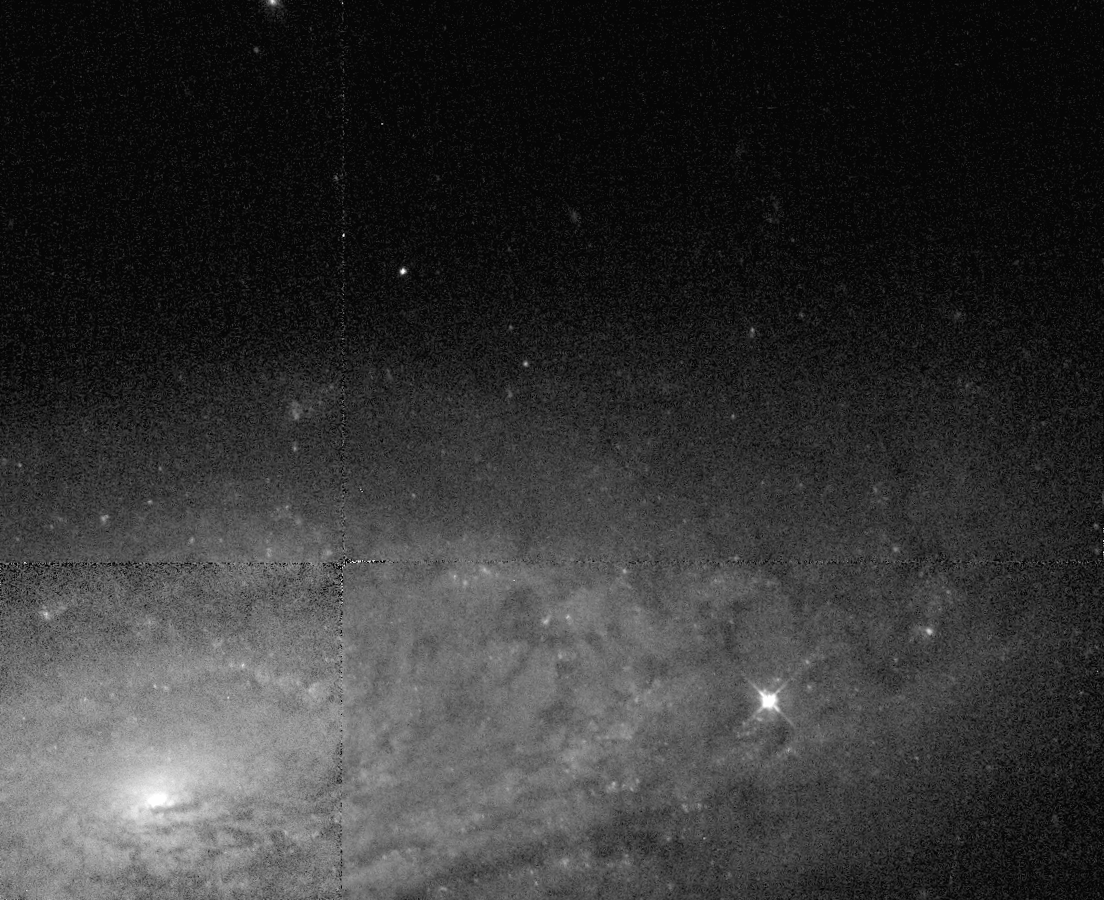
NGC 4062 by the Hubble Space Telescope

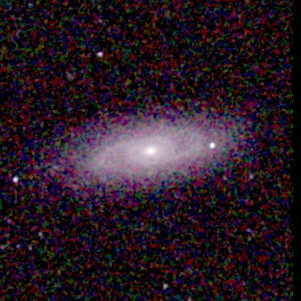
NGC 4062 in infrared by 2MASS
