= NGC 4278 =

Galaxy in the constellation Coma Berenices

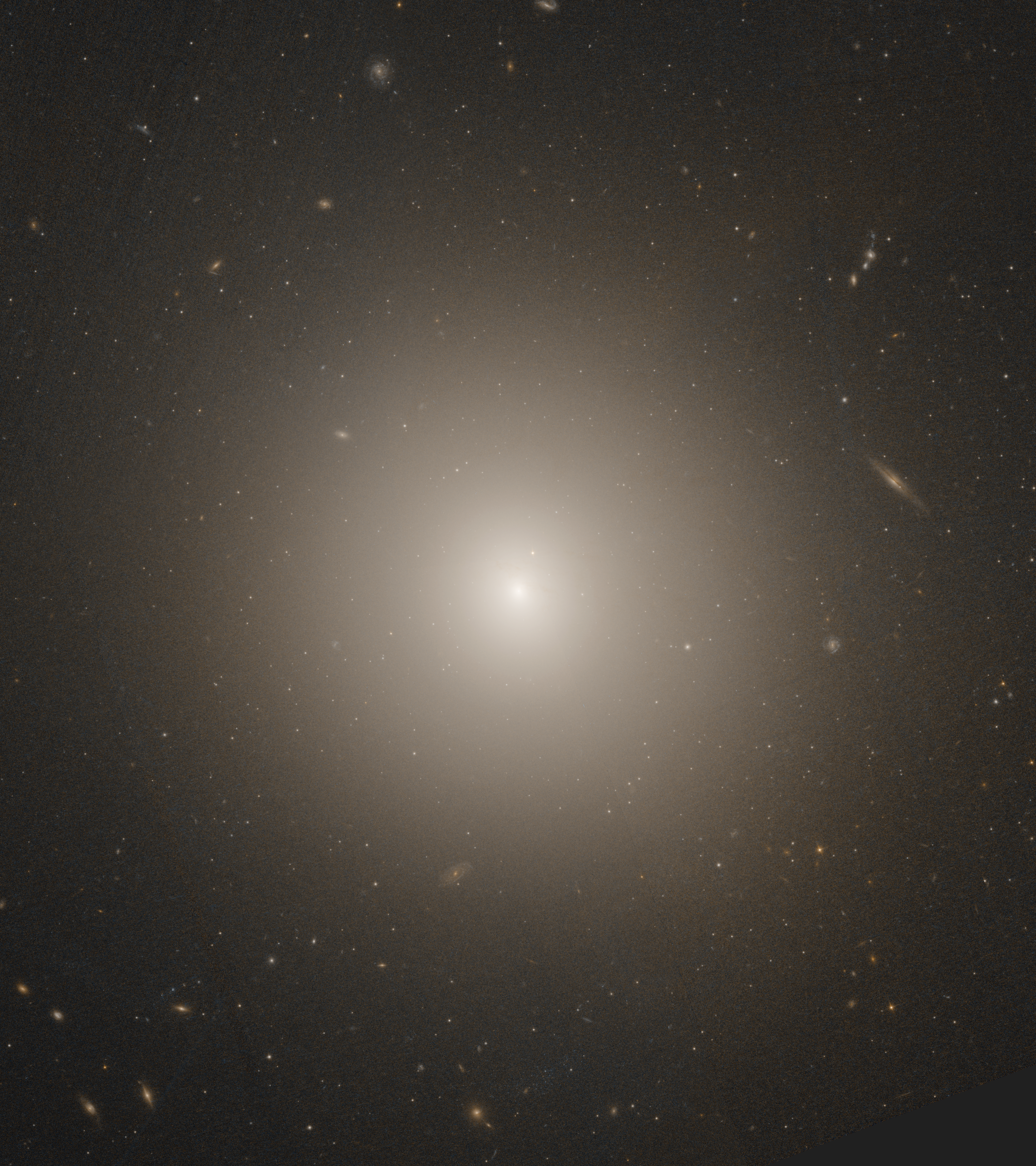
- NGC 4278 by the Hubble Space Telescope

Observation data (J2000 epoch)
- Constellation: Coma Berenices
- Right ascension: 12^{h} 20^{m} 06.8^{s}
- Declination: +29° 16′ 51″
- Redshift: 0.002068±0.000017
- Heliocentric radial velocity: 620±5 km/s
- Distance: 55.1 ± 19 Mly (16.9 ± 5.8 Mpc) 55.1 ± 19 Mly (16.9 ± 5.9 Mpc)
- Group or cluster: Coma I
- Apparent magnitude (V): 10.2

Characteristics
- Type: E1-2
- Apparent size (V): 3.8′ × 3.8′
- Notable features: LINER

Other designations
- NGC 4278, UGC 7386, MCG +05-29-062, B2 1217+29, PGC 39764, CGCG 158-077

NGC 4278 is an elliptical galaxy located in the constellation Coma Berenices. It is located at a distance of circa 55 million light years from Earth, which, given its apparent dimensions, means that NGC 4278 is about 65,000 light years across. It was discovered by William Herschel on March 13, 1785. NGC 4278 is part of the Herschel 400 Catalogue and can be found about one and 3/4 of a degree northwest of Gamma Comae Berenices even with a small telescope.

== Charasteristics ==
NGC 4278 is an elliptical galaxy. Its nucleus has been found to be active (AGN) and based on its spectrum has been identified as a LINER. The most accepted theory for the power source of active galactic nuclei is the presence of an accretion disk around a supermassive black hole. In the centre of NGC 4278 lies a supermassive black hole with an estimated mass (3.09±0.54)×10^{8} M_{☉} based on stellar velocity dispersion. The X-ray emission of the nucleus is consistent with one of a black hole fed by a low radiative efficiency accretion flow.

The nucleus is a source of radio waves and two small symmetric S-shaped radio jets have been observed spanning for 20 mas each, which corresponds to 1.4 parsec at the distance of NGC 4278, emanating from the central source. The nucleus also hosts a compact ultraviolet source, which features strong variability in the form of flares. One such flare was observed between June 1994 and January 1995, when the nuclear source became 1.6 times brighter in six months. Similar flares have also being observed in other low luminosity AGN.

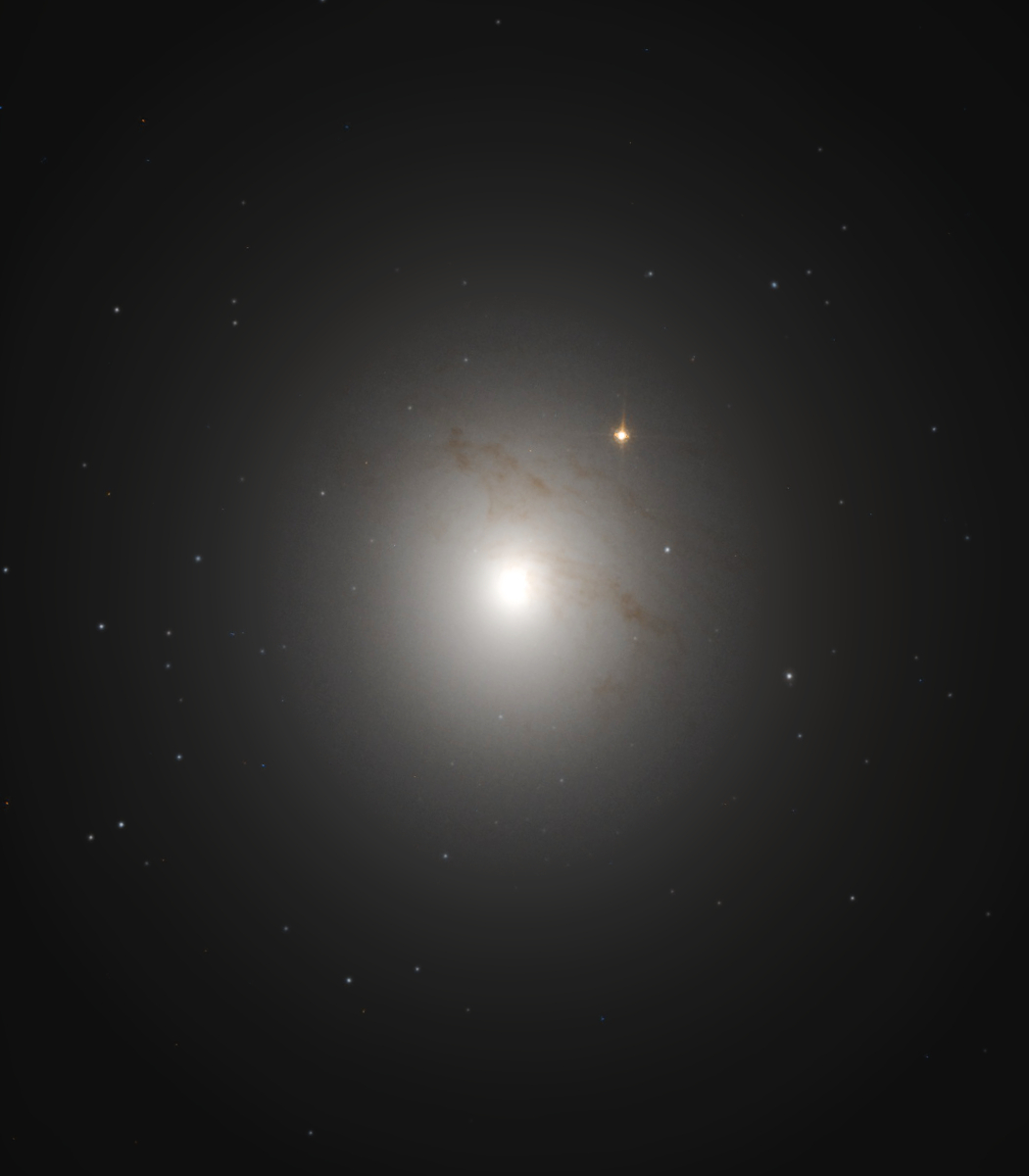
The central region of NGC 4278, with the dust features, by Hubble Space Telescope

Variability has also being observed in X-rays. The galaxy has been found to brighten 5 times within three years, while fluctuations have been observed in shorter time periods, even within an hour, with the flux increasing by a factor of 10% in one observation by XMM-Newton. The spectrum obtained by XMM-Newton can be accounted for by an absorbed power-law, with column density of the order of 10^{20} cm-2. The FeKα emission line has not been detected, as is typical for LINERs. The spectral energy distribution of NGC 4278 resembles a LINER at lower fluxes while at higher fluxes it resembles a low luminosity Seyfert galaxy.

Dust features have been observed in the central part of the galaxy and the area that appears northwest of the nucleus. The dust forms knots and filaments that spiral down to the nucleus. Moreover, the galaxy, contrary to most elliptical galaxies which lack neutral hydrogen emission, has been found to possess a massive HI disk, probably formed after the accretion of a dwarf satellite galaxy. The total mass of the HI disk is estimated to be 6.9×10^{8} M_{☉}. The disk rotates at the same sense as the stars, but is misaligned by 20° to 70°. Molecular clouds, as pointed by CO emission, have also been detected in the galaxy.

The galaxy has been observed with the InfraRed Spectrograph (IRS) onboard Spitzer Space Telescope, examining the dust features of NGC 4278. Multiphase gas and dust have been observed in the same elongated features. Another uncommon finding for an elliptical galaxy is the detection of emission by polycyclic aromatic hydrocarbons (PAHs) and of strong [Si II] 34.8-μm emission. PAHs in other elliptical galaxies are believed to be destroyed by the hot interstellar medium. Emission by molecular hydrogen and ionised gas has also been reported. The observed emission of the gas in the nuclear region has been suggested to be the result of the accretion of cold gas by the HI disk.

NGC 4278 is home to a larger than average number of globular clusters compared with galaxies of similar luminosity, with an estimated total number of 1378+32
−194. As it has been found in other galaxies, the colour distribution of the globular clusters in the galaxy features bimodiality, with the clusters forming a red and a blue subpopulation. The blue clusters have been found to be larger than the red ones at the same galactocentric distance, while the size of the clusters increases with galactocentric radius.

== Nearby galaxies ==
NGC 4278 with NGC 4283 (left).

NGC 4278 has been identified as a member of a galaxy group known as NGC 4274 or NGC 4062 group. Other members of this group are NGC 4020, NGC 4062, NGC 4136, NGC 4173, NGC 4203, NGC 4245, NGC 4251, NGC 4274, NGC 4283, NGC 4310, NGC 4314, NGC 4359, NGC 4414, NGC 4509, and NGC 4525. Another survey placed NGC 4278 in the same group with NGC 4631, NGC 4656, NGC 4559, NGC 4448, and NGC 4414. It is part of the Coma I Group which is part of the Virgo Supercluster.

NGC 4283 lies 3.5 arcminutes to the northeast and NGC 4286 9 arcminutes northeast of NGC 4278 in the sky. NGC 4274 lies about 20 arcminutes north of NGC 4278.

== See also ==
- IC 1459 - a similar elliptical galaxy
