= NGC 4136 =

Galaxy in the constellation Coma Berenices

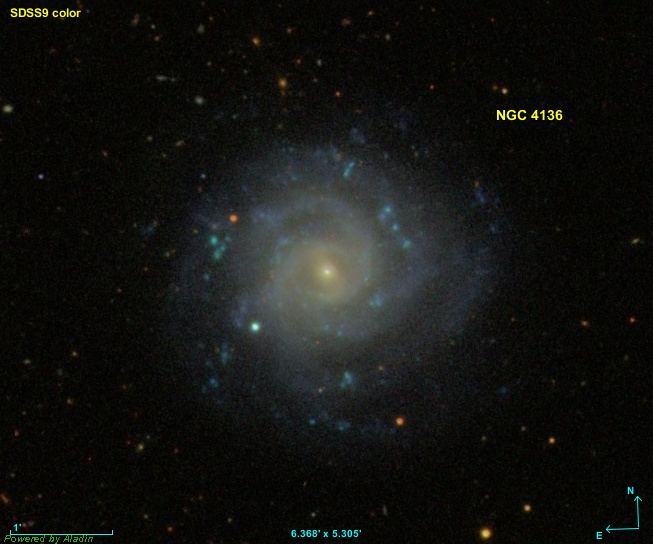
- NGC 4136 imaged by SDSS

Observation data (J2000 epoch)
- Constellation: Coma Berenices
- Right ascension: 12^{h} 09^{m} 17.7147^{s}
- Declination: +29° 55′ 39.556″
- Redshift: 0.002021
- Heliocentric radial velocity: 606±3 km/s
- Distance: 43.0 ± 3.2 Mly (13.17 ± 0.97 Mpc)
- Group or cluster: NGC 4274 Group (LGG 279)
- Apparent magnitude (V): 11.1

Characteristics
- Type: SAB(r)c
- Size: ~45,900 ly (14.06 kpc) (estimated)
- Apparent size (V): 3.9′ × 3.6′

Other designations
- IRAS 12067+3012, UGC 7134, MCG +05-29-025, PGC 38618, CGCG 158-034

NGC 4136 is a barred spiral galaxy in the constellation of Coma Berenices. Its velocity with respect to the cosmic microwave background is 893±20 km/s, which corresponds to a Hubble distance of 43.0 ± 3.2 Mly (13.17 ± 0.97 Mpc). Additionally, seven non-redshift measurements give a distance of 37.53 ± 4.85 Mly (11.506 ± 1.488 Mpc). It was discovered by German-British astronomer William Herschel on 13 March 1785.

== Morphology ==
Eskridge, Frogel, and Pogge published a paper in 2002 describing the morphology of 205 closely spaced spiral or lenticular galaxies. The observations were made in the H-band of the infrared and in the B-band (blue). Eskridge and colleagues described NGC 4136 as follows:

Small, centrally condensed bulge, threaded by a short, thick bar. Bar ends on a full, high-contrast inner ring. The major axis of the ring is nearly orthogonal to that of the bar. Two open, LSB [Low Surface Brightness] spiral arms emerge from the major axis ends of the ring and can be traced through ~120° before fading. The south arm is fainter than the north arm. Most of the bright knots are associated with the interarm disk...We classify NGC 4136 substantially earlier in the H band because the outer, open spiral arms are very faint in the near-IR, leaving the inner arm/ring structure as the spiral feature that dominates the classification.

== NGC 4274 Group ==
NGC 4136 is a member of the NGC 4274 group (also known as LGG 279) which has at least 19 galaxies, including NGC 4020, NGC 4062, NGC 4173, NGC 4203, NGC 4245, NGC 4251, NGC 4274, NGC 4278, NGC 4283, NGC 4310, NGC 4314, NGC 4359, NGC 4414, NGC 4509, NGC 4525, UGC 7300, and MCG +05-29-066.

== Supernova ==
One supernova has been observed in NGC 4136: SN 1941C (type unknown, mag. 16.8) was discovered by Rebecca B. Jones on 16 April 1941.

== See also ==
- List of NGC objects (4001–5000)
