= NGC 4020 =

Galaxy in the constellation Ursa Major

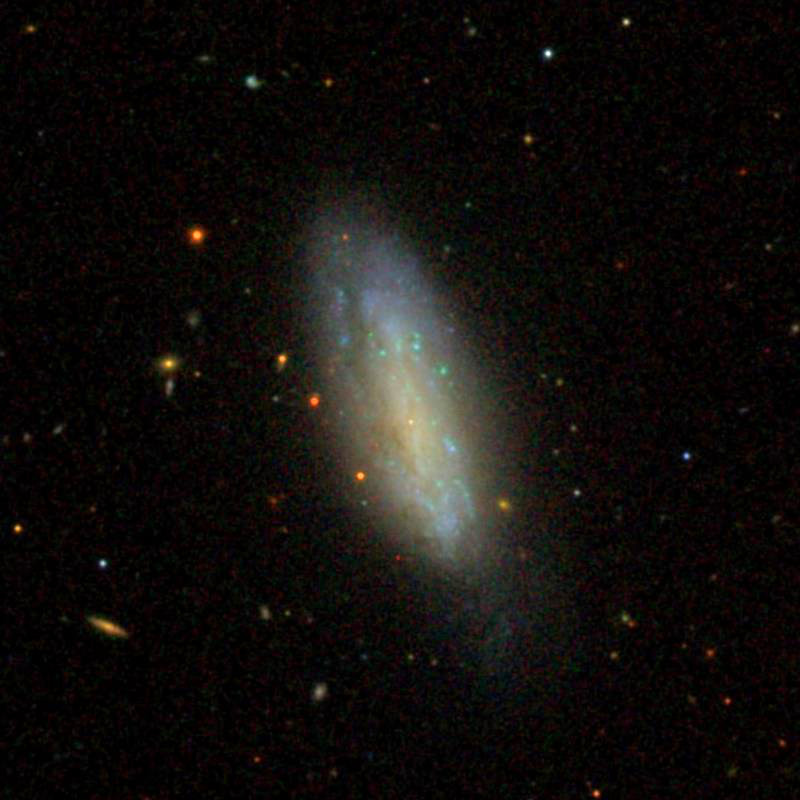

Observation data (J2000.0 epoch)
- Constellation: Ursa Major
- Right ascension: 11^{h} 58^{m} 56,8^{s}
- Declination: +30° 24′ 49″
- Redshift: 0.002535
- Distance: 40.7 million LY
- Apparent magnitude (V): 13.10

Characteristics
- Apparent size (V): 1.90 x 1.0

Other designations
- UGC 06971, CGCG 157-072, CGCG 1156.3+3041, MCG +05-28-066

NGC 4020 is a spiral galaxy in the constellation Ursa Major. It's classified as a type SAcd galaxy. The galaxy was first discovered in 1788 by astronomer William Herschel and again in 1831 by John Herschel. It's around 22,500 light years across at its longest diameter.

John Louis Emil Dreyer, compiler of the New General Catalogue, described it as, "pretty bright, pretty large, extended 19.5°, binuclear.”

Its radial velocity, relative to the cosmic microwave background is measured around 1048 ± 20 km/s, and a Hubble distance of around 15.46 ± 1.12 Mpc.

== Nearby galaxies ==
NGC 4020 is one of the members of the Coma I group and a member of the NGC 4278 subgroup. The group has at least 19 galaxies, including NGC 4525, NGC 4136, NGC 4173, NGC 4203, NGC 4509, NGC 4251, NGC 4274, NGC 4278, NGC 4283, NGC 4310, NGC 4314, NGC 4359, NGC 4414, NGC 4245, and NGC 4136. The group is located within the Virgo Supercluster.
