= NGC 4525 =

Galaxy in the constellation Coma Berenices

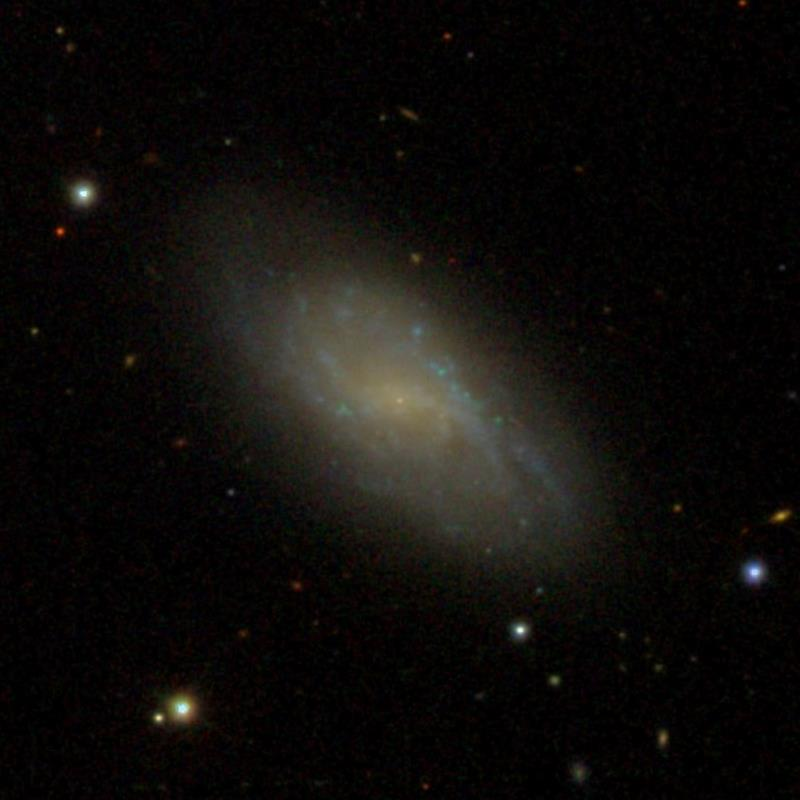

Observation data (J2000.0 epoch)
- Constellation: Coma Berenices
- Right ascension: 12^{h} 33^{m} 55,1^{s}
- Declination: +30° 16′ 39″
- Redshift: 0.003944
- Heliocentric radial velocity: 1,177 km/s
- Distance: 53 million LY
- Apparent magnitude (V): 13.0

Characteristics
- Apparent size (V): 2.60 x 1.3

NGC 4525 (also known as KUG 1231+305 or UGC 7714) is a spiral galaxy in the constellation Coma Berenices. It's classified as a type Sbc galaxy. The galaxy was first discovered in 1785 by astronomer William Herschel whilst using an 18.7-inch speculum telescope. It’s estimated to be around 53 million light years away from the Milky Way.

== Nearby galaxies ==
NGC 4525 is one of the members of the Coma I group and a member of the NGC 4278 subgroup. The group has at least 19 galaxies, including NGC 4020, NGC 4136, NGC 4173, NGC 4203, NGC 4509, NGC 4251, NGC 4274, NGC 4278, NGC 4283, NGC 4310, NGC 4314, NGC 4359, NGC 4414, NGC 4245, and NGC 4136. The group is located within the Virgo Supercluster.
