= NGC 4670 =

Galaxy in the constellation Coma Berenices

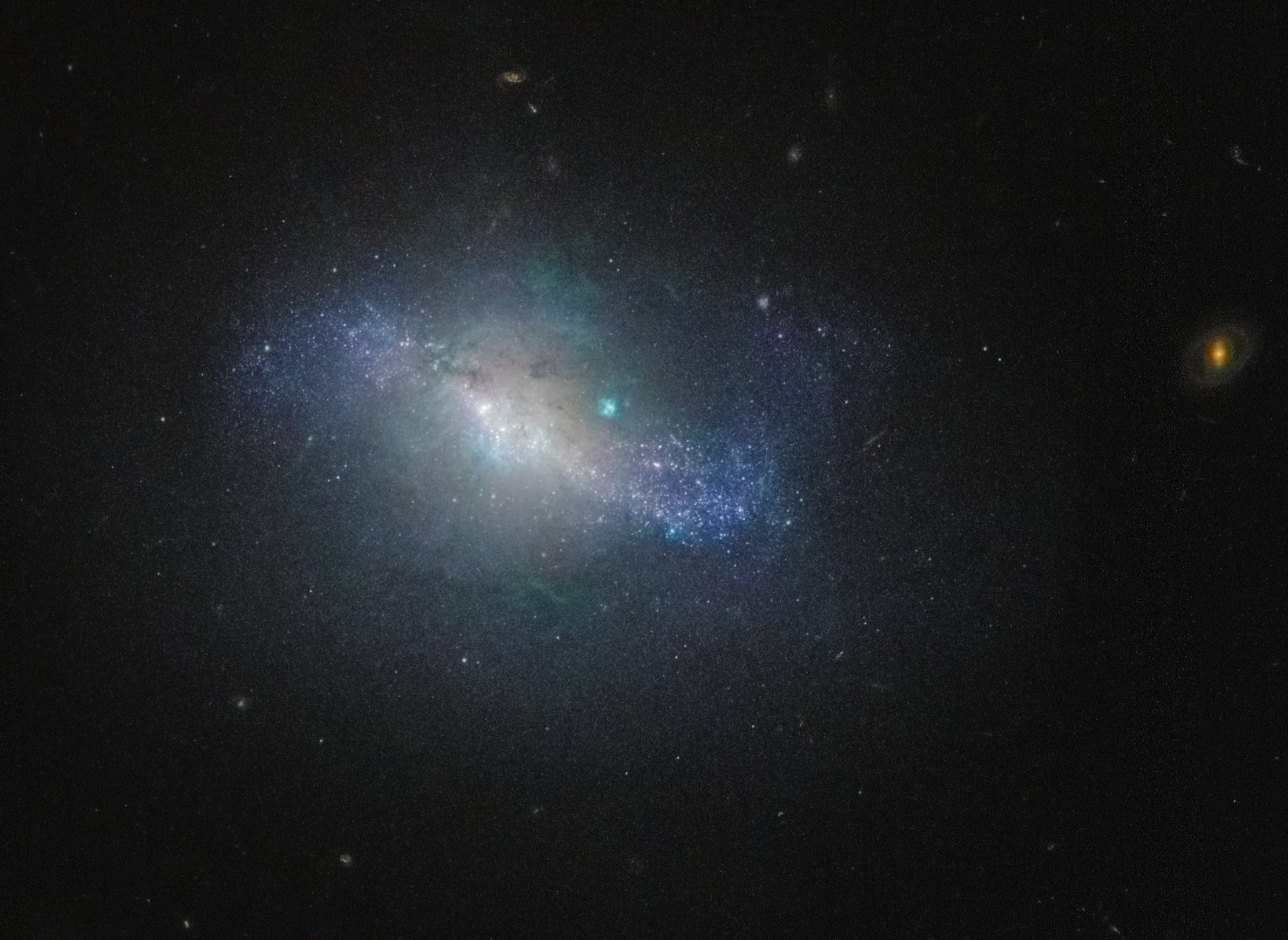
- NGC 4670 by Hubble Space Telescope

Observation data (J2000 epoch)
- Constellation: Coma Berenices
- Right ascension: 12^{h} 45^{m} 17.1^{s}
- Declination: +27° 07′ 32″
- Redshift: 0.003630 ± 0.000005
- Heliocentric radial velocity: 1,088 ± 1 km/s
- Distance: 57.6 ± 17 Mly (17.7 ± 4.7 Mpc)
- Apparent magnitude (V): 12.2

Characteristics
- Type: SB(s)0/a pec
- Apparent size (V): 1.4′ × 1.1′
- Notable features: Blue compact dwarf

Other designations
- UGC 7930, Arp 163, Haro 9, MCG +05-30-072, KUG 1242+273, IRAS 12428+2724, PGC 42987

NGC 4670 is a blue compact galaxy in the constellation Coma Berenices. The galaxy lies about 60 million light years away from Earth, which means, given its apparent dimensions, that NGC 4670 is approximately 25,000 light years across. It was discovered by William Herschel on April 6, 1785.

== Characteristics ==
The overall shape of the galaxy is categorised as peculiar and it has been categorised as amorphous or as barred lenticular galaxy. NGC 4670 is included in the Atlas of Peculiar Galaxies in the galaxies with diffuse counter tails category. The gas kinematics indicate the presence of a central bar. The galaxy is seen with an 28° inclination but it is possibly warped.

NGC 4670 is characterised by its blue color, which was noted by Guillermo Haro in a study published in 1956. Such galaxies are characterised by episodes of intense star formation. The centre of NGC 4670 hosts a supergiant HII region and also hosts most of the hydrogen of the galaxy. The hydrogen lies in three clouds with an estimated mass of 10^{8} M_{☉}. Four other HII regions are visible near the central region.

The galaxy has also ionised gas outside of the central region, forming bubbles and filaments. The two larger filaments extend to the southwest and northeast and a have a calculated length of 7.5 and 6.5 kpc respectively.

An X-ray and radio source has been detected in the galaxy at the location of a star cluster complex but its nature is uncertain. It could be a massive black hole, an ultraluminous X-ray bubble, an X-ray binary star or a supernova remnant.

== Nearby galaxies ==
NGC 4670 is considered to be a member of the NGC 4565 Group, which also includes, apart from NGC 4565, the galaxies NGC 4494, NGC 4562, NGC 4725, and NGC 4747.
