= Coma I =

Galaxy cluster in constellation Coma Berenices

Coma I Group
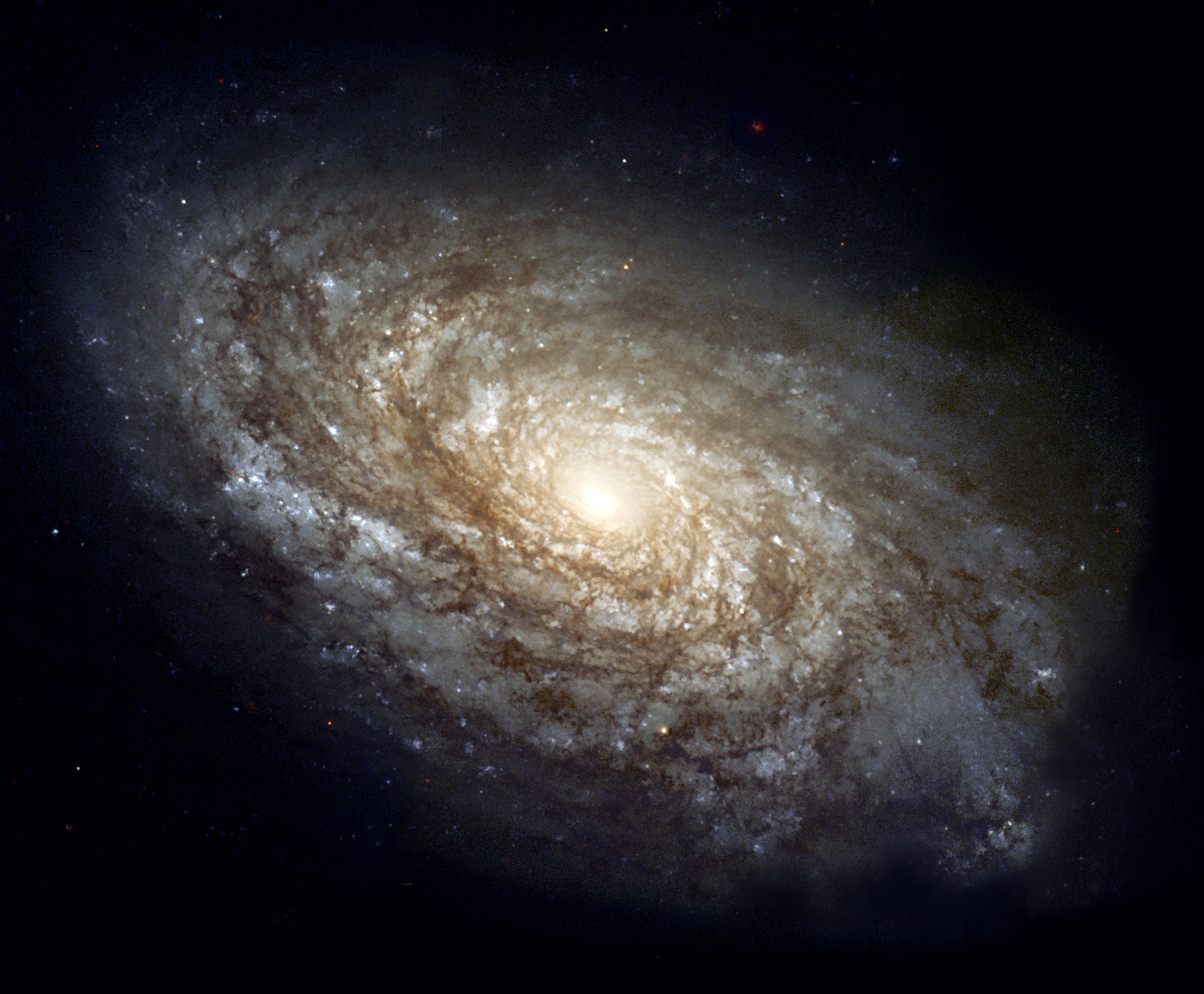
- NGC 4414, a flocculent spiral galaxy in the Coma I Group

Observation data (Epoch J2000)
- Constellation(s): Coma Berenices & Ursa Major
- Right ascension: 12^{h} 22^{m} 19.4^{s}
- Declination: 29° 53′ 47″
- Brightest member: NGC 4725
- Number of galaxies: 22–34
- Velocity dispersion: 307 km/s
- Redshift: 0.002418 (724 km/s)
- Distance: 14.52 Mpc (47.4 Mly)
- Binding mass: 2.5×10^{12} M_{☉}
- X-ray luminosity: 1.6×10^{43} erg/s

Other designations
- Coma I Group, NGC 4274 Group, NGC 4062 Group, NGC 4565 Group, NGC 4631 Group, LGG 279, LGG 291, LGG 294 NBGG 14-01, NBGG 14-02, NBGG 14 -2 +1, NGC 4203 Group, NOGG H 611, NOGG P1 631, NOGG P2 642, NOGG P2 641

The Coma I Group is a group of galaxies located about 14.5 Mpc (47.3 Mly) away in the constellation Coma Berenices. The brightest member of the group is NGC 4725. The Coma I Group is rich in spiral galaxies while containing few elliptical and lenticular galaxies. Coma I lies in the foreground of the more distant Coma and Leo clusters and is located within the Virgo Supercluster, within the Coma-Sculptor Cloud.

The Coma I Group is currently infalling into the Virgo Cluster and will eventually merge with it.

== Structure ==
The Coma I Group appears to consist of two main subgroups, a denser subgroup centered on NGC 4274 and NGC 4278, and looser one surrounding NGC 4565 as suggested by De Vaucouleurs. However, Gregory and Thompson (1977) found no clear evidence for two distinct subgroups in Coma I. They noted a slight density enhancement around NGC 4274 with the rest of the members of Coma I uniformly distributed to the southeast of this density enhancement. They also noted a central bar-like structure with a minor axis of 0.9 Mpc (2.9 Mly) and a major axis of 2.3 Mpc (7.5 Mly). P. Fouque et al. and A. M. Garcia et al. both list the Coma I group consisting of two subgroups centered on NGC 4274 and NGC 4565. Additionally, Gibson et al. suggests that another association, the Coma II Group which is centered on NGC 4725 is associated with the Coma I Group. In 2000, Ferrarese et al. defined the Coma II Group as containing 5 galaxies, namely NGC 4494, NGC 4562, NGC 4565, NGC 4725, and NGC 4747. Also, it was found that these 5 galaxies which make up the Coma II Group have radial velocities in the narrow range of 1190 to 1395 km/s which is larger than the range of galaxies that are part of the Coma I group which have ranges of 600 to 1000 km/s.

The nearby NGC 4631 Group is sometimes listed in some catalogs as being part of the Coma I Group, while other catalogs list the group as being separate from the Coma I Group.

== Members ==
The table below lists galaxies that have been commonly and consistently identified as group members in the Nearby Galaxies Catalog, the survey of Fouque et al., the Lyons Groups of Galaxies (LGG) Catalog, and the three group lists created from the Nearby Optical Galaxy sample of Giuricin et al.

Members of the Coma I Group
Name	Type	R.A. (J2000)	Dec. (J2000)	Redshift (km/s)	Apparent Magnitude
NGC 4020	SBd?	11^{h} 58^{m} 56.7^{s}	+30° 24′ 43″	760	13.1
NGC 4062	SA(s)c	12^{h} 04^{m} 03.8^{s}	+31° 53′ 45″	758	12.5
NGC 4136	SAB(r)c	12^{h} 09^{m} 17.7^{s}	+29° 55′ 39″	609	11.69
NGC 4173	SBd	12^{h} 12^{m} 21.4^{s}	+29° 12′ 25″	1127	13.59
NGC 4203	SAB0^-?	12^{h} 15^{m} 05.0^{s}	+33° 11′ 50″	1086	11.8
NGC 4245	SB0/a?(r)	12^{h} 17^{m} 36.8^{s}	+29° 36′ 29″	884	12.31
NGC 4251	SB0?	12^{h} 18^{m} 08.2^{s}	+28° 10′ 31″	1066	11.58
NGC 4274	(R)SB(r)ab	12^{h} 19^{m} 50.6^{s}	+29° 36′ 52″	930	11.34
NGC 4278	E1-2	12^{h} 20^{m} 06.8^{s}	+29° 16′ 51″	620	11.20
NGC 4283	E0	12^{h} 20^{m} 20.8^{s}	+29° 18′ 39″	1056	13.10
NGC 4310 (NGC 4338)	(R')SAB0^+(r)?	12^{h} 22^{m} 26.3^{s}	+29° 12′ 33″	913	13.22
NGC 4314	SB(rs)a	12^{h} 22^{m} 31.8^{s}	+29° 53′ 45″	963	11.43
NGC 4359	SB(rs)c?	12^{h} 24^{m} 11.2^{s}	+31° 31′ 19″	1253	13.6
NGC 4393	SABd	12^{h} 25^{m} 51.2^{s}	+27° 33′ 42″	755	12.7
NGC 4414	SA(rs)c?	12^{h} 26^{m} 27.1^{s}	+31° 13′ 25″	716	10.96
NGC 4448	SB(r)ab	12^{h} 28^{m} 15.4^{s}	+28° 37′ 13″	661	12.00
NGC 4494	E1-2	12^{h} 31^{m} 24.1^{s}	+25° 46′ 31″	1342	10.71
NGC 4525	Scd?	12^{h} 33^{m} 51.1^{s}	+30° 16′ 39″	1172	13.4
NGC 4559	SAB(rs)cd	12^{h} 35^{m} 57.6^{s}	+27° 57′ 36″	807	10.46
NGC 4562	SB(s)dm?	12^{h} 35^{m} 34.8^{s}	+25° 51′ 00″	1353	13.9
NGC 4565	SA(s)b?	12^{h} 36^{m} 20.8^{s}	+25° 59′ 16″	1230	10.42
NGC 4725	SAB(r)ab pec	12^{h} 50^{m} 26.6^{s}	+25° 30′ 03″	1206	10.11
NGC 4747	SBcd? pec	12^{h} 51^{m} 45.9^{s}	+25° 46′ 37″	1190	12.96

Other possible member galaxies (galaxies listed in only one or two of the lists from the above references) include IC 3215, IC 3247, IC 3571 MCG 5-29- 66, NGC 4080, NGC 4150, NGC 4308, NGC 4455, NGC 4509, NGC 4534, NGC 4627, NGC 4631, NGC 4656, NGC 4670, UGC 6900, UGC 7007, UGC 7300, UGC 7428, UGC 7438, UGC 7673, UGC 7916 and UGCA 294.

== Nearby groups ==
The center of the Virgo Cluster (M87) lies about 3.6 Mpc (11.7 Mly) from the Coma I Group.

== See also ==
- List of Galaxy Groups
- M94 Group
- M96 Group
- Ursa Major Cluster – Another nearby spiral-rich group within the Virgo Supercluster
