= NGC 4494 =

Galaxy in the constellation Coma Berenices

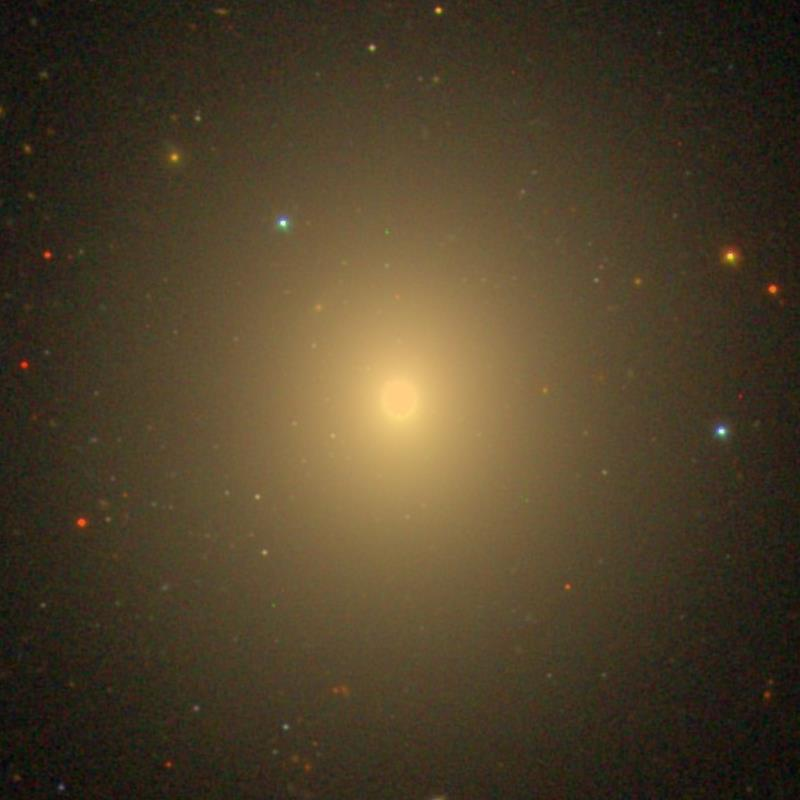
- NGC 4494 by SDSS

Observation data (J2000 epoch)
- Constellation: Coma Berenices
- Right ascension: 12^{h} 31^{m} 24.1^{s}
- Declination: +25° 46′ 31″
- Redshift: 1,342±5 km/s
- Distance: 45 ± 10 Mly (13.8 ± 3.1 Mpc)
- Apparent magnitude (V): 9.7

Characteristics
- Type: E1–2
- Apparent size (V): 4.8′ × 3.5′

Other designations
- NGC 4494, UGC 7662, MCG +04-30-002, PGC 41441

NGC 4494 is an elliptical galaxy located in the constellation of Coma Berenices. It is located at a distance of circa 45 million light years from Earth, which, given its apparent dimensions, means that NGC 4494 is about 60,000 light years across. It was discovered by German-British astronomer William Herschel in 1785.

== Characteristics ==
The galaxy hosts a supermassive black hole with estimated mass 26.9 ± 20.4 millions M⊙, based on velocity dispersion. A nuclear dust ring has been detected in NGC 4494, based on observations by the Hubble Space Telescope. It has semimajor axis 0.6 arcseconds, which corresponds to 60 parsec at the distance of NGC 4494. Its ring is symmetric, implying that the dust has settled in this galaxy, after the galaxy merger with a relatively gas rich galaxy that led to its creation. The core of NGC 4494 is kinematically decoupled, as with many elliptical galaxies, probably a result of a galaxy merger.

=== Dark matter ===
In observations by XMM-Newton observatory, the galaxy was quite faint in X-rays, nearly two orders of magnitude fainter than galaxies with similar optical luminosities. This fact has been attributed to lack of dark matter and hot gas of the galaxy.

The amount of dark matter existing in the halo of NGC 4494 has been debated. The galaxy is characterised as "naked" by Romanowsky et al., Napolitano et al. found that the dark matter halo has unexpectedly low central density and the analysis by Deason et al. revealed an unusually low dark matter fraction, 0.32 ± 0.12 at 5Re. Rodionov and Athanassoula tried to set strict constraint to the halo mass, but with only partial success. On the other hand, Morganti et al. found the dark matter fraction to be about 0.6 ± 0.1 at 5Re, with particularly high dark matter fraction inside ~ 3Re.

== Nearby galaxies ==
NGC 4494 belongs to the NGC 4565 group, named after the spiral galaxy NGC 4565. Other members of the group are NGC 4525, NGC 4562, NGC 4570, NGC 4725 and NGC 4747. NGC 4494 is also a member of the Coma I Group which is part of the Virgo Supercluster.

== Gallery ==
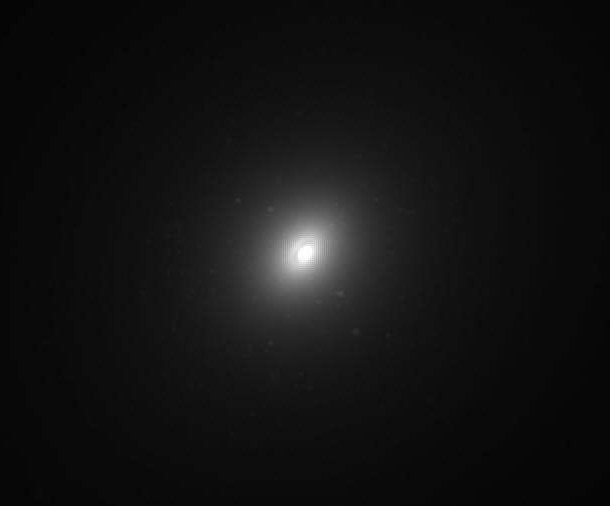
The nucleus of NGC 4494 by Hubble Space Telescope.
