= NGC 4395 =

Galaxy in the constellation Canes Venatici

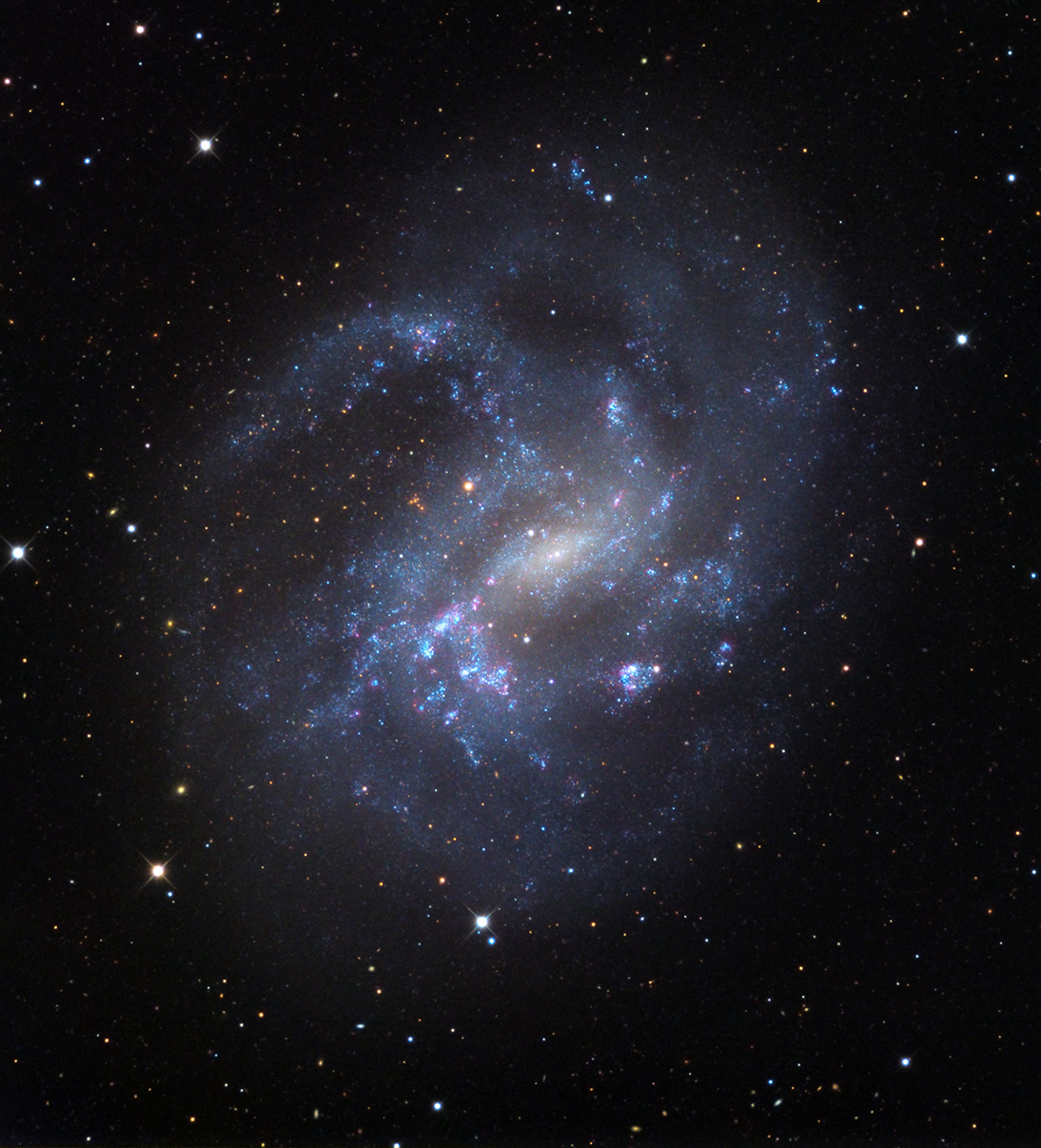
- NGC 4395 imaged by Mount Lemmon SkyCenter

Observation data (J2000 epoch)
- Constellation: Canes Venatici
- Right ascension: 12^{h} 25^{m} 48.8599^{s}
- Declination: +33° 32′ 48.711″
- Redshift: 0.001064
- Heliocentric radial velocity: 319±1 km/s
- Distance: 13.90 ± 0.86 Mly (4.261 ± 0.264 Mpc)
- Group or cluster: NGC 4631 Group (LGG 291)
- Apparent magnitude (V): 10.6

Characteristics
- Type: SA(s)m
- Size: ~64,700 ly (19.83 kpc) (estimated)
- Apparent size (V): 13.2′ × 11.0′

Other designations
- IRAS 12233+3348, UGC 7542, MCG +06-27-053, PGC 40596, CGCG 187-042

NGC 4395 is a nearby low surface brightness spiral galaxy located about 14 million light-years (or 4.3 Mpc) from Earth in the constellation Canes Venatici. It was discovered by German-British astronomer William Herschel on 2 January 1786. The nucleus of NGC 4395 is active and the galaxy is classified as a Seyfert Type I, known for its very low-mass supermassive black hole.

== Physical characteristics ==
NGC 4395 has a halo that is about 8′ in diameter. It has several patches of greater brightness running northwest to southeast. The one furthest southeast is the brightest. Three of the patches have their own NGC numbers: 4401, 4400, and 4399 running east to west.

The galaxy is highly unusual for Seyfert galaxies, because it does not have a bulge and is considered to be a dwarf galaxy.

== Observational history ==
NGC 4395 was imaged and classified as a "spiral nebula" in a 1920 paper by astronomer Francis G. Pease. Now, it is known to be a galaxy distinct from the Milky Way (see Great Debate). Along with several other nearby galaxies, resolved stars in NGC 4395 were used to measure the expansion rate of the Universe by Allan Sandage and Gustav Andreas Tammann in their 1974 paper. More recently, NGC 4395 was discovered to contain a very low-luminosity active galactic nucleus. Since then, its nucleus has been the subject of several academic papers and attempts to measure the mass of its central black hole.

== Nucleus ==
NGC 4395 is one of the least luminous and nearest Seyfert galaxies known. The nucleus of NGC 4395 is notable for containing one of the smallest supermassive black holes with a well-measured mass. The central black hole has a mass of "only" 300,000 M_{☉}. However, more recent studies found a black hole mass of just 4,000 M_{☉} to 20,000 M_{☉}. The low-mass black hole in NGC 4395 would make it a so-called "intermediate-mass black hole". The black hole may have a truncated disk.

== NGC 4631 Group ==
According to A.M. Garcia, NGC 4395 is part of the NGC 4631 group (also known as LGG 291) that has at least 14 members. The other members are NGC 4150, NGC 4163, NGC 4190, NGC 4214, NGC 4244, NGC 4308, NGC 4631, NGC 4656, IC 779, UGC 7605, UGC 7698, UGCA 276, and UGCA 292.

== See also ==
- List of NGC objects (4001–5000)
