= AINUR =

Nuclear ring catalogue

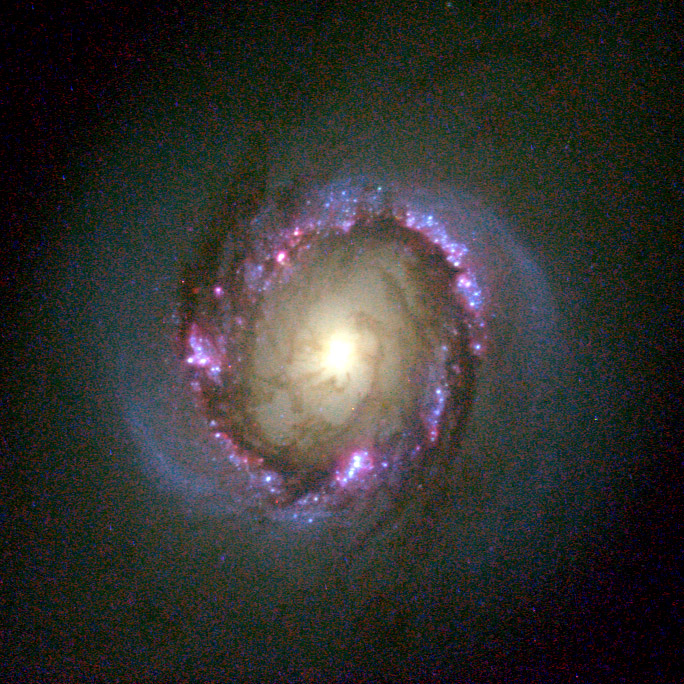
NGC 4314. The nuclear ring appears in violet.

The Atlas of Images of NUclear Rings (AINUR) is a catalogue of nuclear rings, which are enormous star-forming ring-shaped regions that circle certain galactic nuclei. The first edition of the atlas was published in 2010 in the Monthly Notices of the Royal Astronomical Society, and includes 113 such rings in 107 galaxies. The catalogue resulted from a joint study by researchers from the Institute of Astrophysics of the Canary Islands (IAC) and the universities of La Laguna, Oulu and Alabama led by Sébastien Comerón from the IAC.

Nuclear rings are star-forming configurations around galactic nuclei. They may vary in diameter from 500 to 3,000 light years, and are relatively bright due to an abundance of young stars, some of which are extremely massive and consequently enjoy short, very bright lives before ending as supernovae. Most of these rings are associated with Lindblad resonance (after Bertil Lindblad) which is a gravitational effect that nudges matter into preferred orbits.
