= NGC 4393 =

Galaxy in the constellation of Coma Berenices

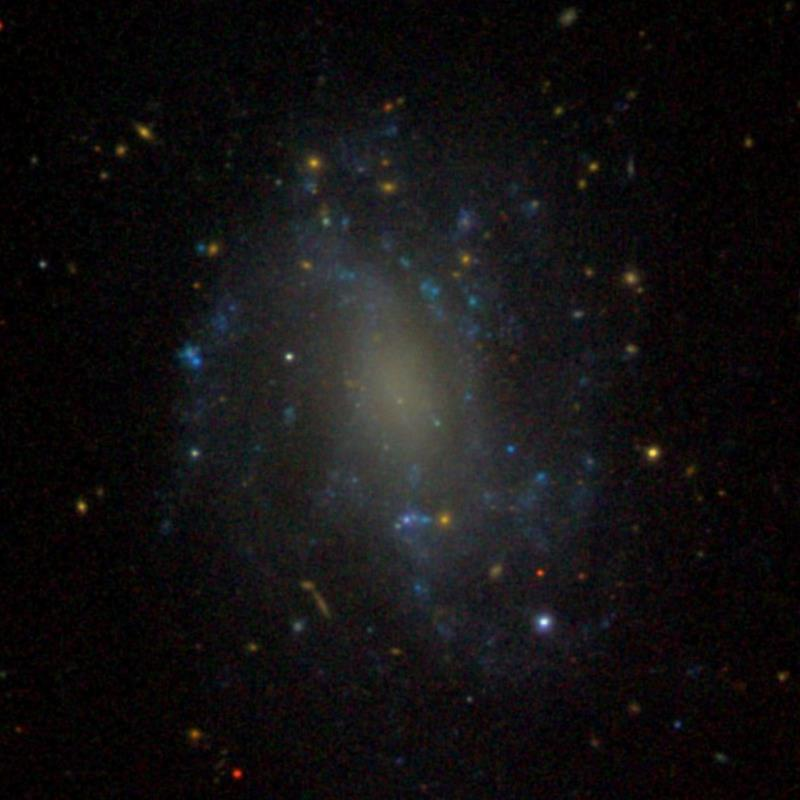
- SDSS image of NGC 4393.

Observation data (J2000 epoch)
- Constellation: Coma Berenices
- Right ascension: 12^{h} 25^{m} 51.2^{s}
- Declination: 27° 33′ 42″
- Redshift: 0.002505
- Heliocentric radial velocity: 751 km/s
- Distance: 46 Mly (14.2 Mpc)
- Group or cluster: Coma I (NGC 4274 subgroup)
- Apparent magnitude (V): 12.7

Characteristics
- Type: SABd
- Size: ~38,700 ly (11.86 kpc) (estimated)
- Apparent size (V): 3.2 x 3.0

Other designations
- UGC 07521, PGC 040600, MCG +05-29-083

NGC 4393 is a spiral galaxy about 46 million light-years away in the constellation Coma Berenices. It was discovered by astronomer William Herschel on April 11, 1785. It is a member of the NGC 4274 Group, which is part of the Coma I Group or Cloud.

== Physical characteristics ==
NGC 4393 is a flocculent spiral galaxy, with chaotic, fragmented and unsymmetric arms. IC 3329, an HII region in NGC 4393, was discovered by astronomer Max Wolf on March 23, 1903. It was described as "very faint, small, irregular figure, attached to (NGC) 4393".

NGC 4393 hosts a pseudo-bulge, a type of galactic bulge which is more similar to a spiral galaxy in that it has one or more characteristics of disk galaxies. These include having flatter shapes than those of classical bulges, large ratios of ordered motions of stars rather than random motions of stars, small velocity dispersions of stars with respect to the Faber-Jackson correlation between velocity dispersion and bulge luminosity, a spiral structure or nuclear bar in the bulge part of the light profile, nearly exponential brightness profiles, and starbursts.

== Nuclear Star Cluster ==
The central region of NGC 4393 is host to a nuclear star cluster with a mass of 0.4048 ± 0.0819 million M_{☉}, and a diameter of ~16 ly (4.8 pc).

== See also ==
- List of NGC objects (4001–5000)
- Coma I
