= NGC 4308 =

Elliptical galaxy in the constellation Coma Berenices

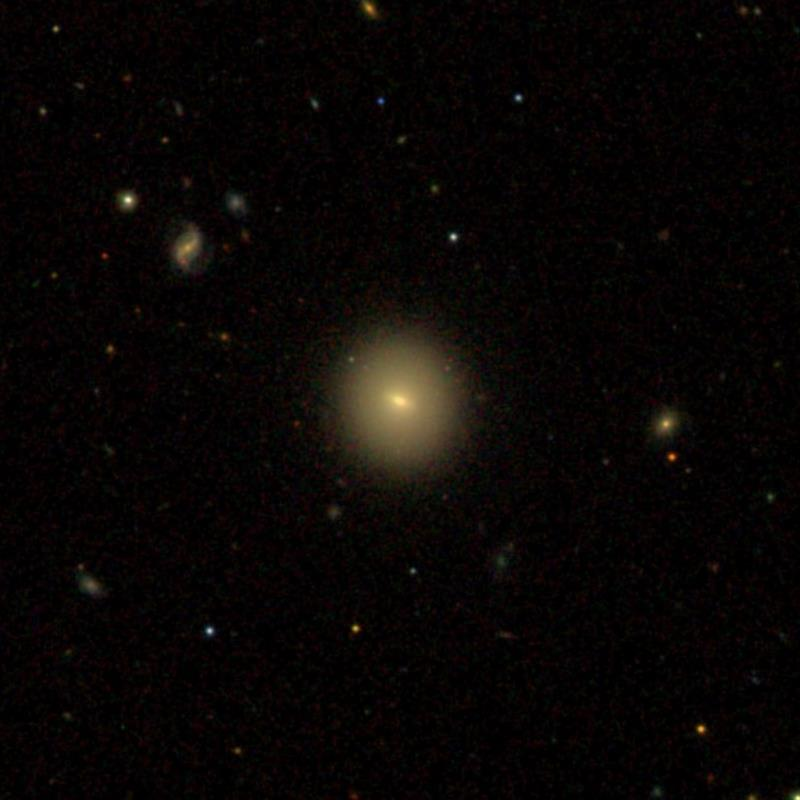
- SDSS image of NGC 4308.

Observation data (J2000 epoch)
- Constellation: Coma Berenices
- Right ascension: 12^{h} 21^{m} 56.9^{s}
- Declination: +30° 04′ 27″
- Redshift: 589 ± 10 km/s
- Apparent magnitude (V): 14.4

Characteristics
- Type: E
- Apparent size (V): 0.8′ × 0.7′

Other designations
- UGC 7426, PGC 40011

NGC 4308 is an elliptical galaxy in the constellation Coma Berenices. It is a member of the Coma I Group.
