= NGC 4448 =

Galaxy in the constellation Coma Berenices

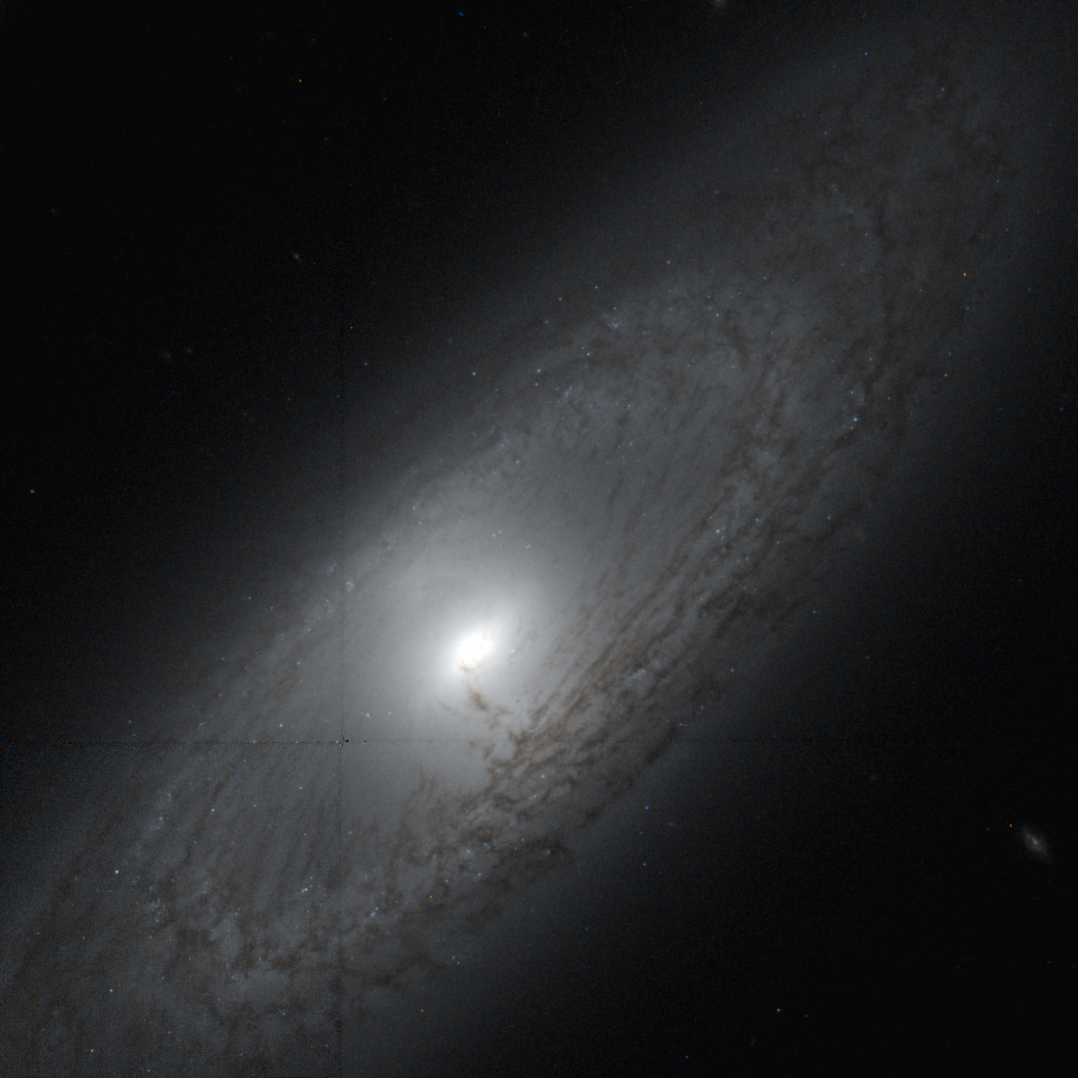
- Hubble Space Telescope (visible, near-infrared)

Observation data (J2000 epoch)
- Constellation: Coma Berenices
- Right ascension: 12^{h} 28^{m} 15.428^{s}
- Declination: +28° 37′ 13.08″
- Redshift: 0.002205
- Heliocentric radial velocity: 661±6 km/s
- Distance: 76.81 ± 0.65 Mly (23.55 ± 0.20 Mpc)
- Group or cluster: Coma I
- Apparent magnitude (V): 11.2

Characteristics
- Type: SB(r)ab
- Apparent size (V): 3.9′ × 1.4′

Other designations
- NGC 4448, UGC 7591, PGC 40988

NGC 4448 is a barred spiral galaxy in the constellation of Coma Berenices. It was discovered April 11, 1785 by German-British astronomer William Herschel. This galaxy has an apparent visual magnitude of 11.2 and spans an angular size of 3.9′ × 1.4′. The core of NGC 4448 can be spotted in a small telescope at an angle of 30′ to the northeast of the star Gamma Comae Berenices. It is located at a distance of 76.8 million light-years (23.55 Mpc) from the Milky Way, where it is a member of the Coma I Group of galaxies.

The morphological classification of this galaxy is SB(r)ab, indicating a barred spiral galaxy (SB) with an inner ring structure (r) and somewhat tightly-wound arms (ab). It is inclined at an angle of about 70° to the plane of the sky and so is being viewed nearly edge on.
