= NGC 4534 =

Spiral galaxy in constellation Canes Venatici

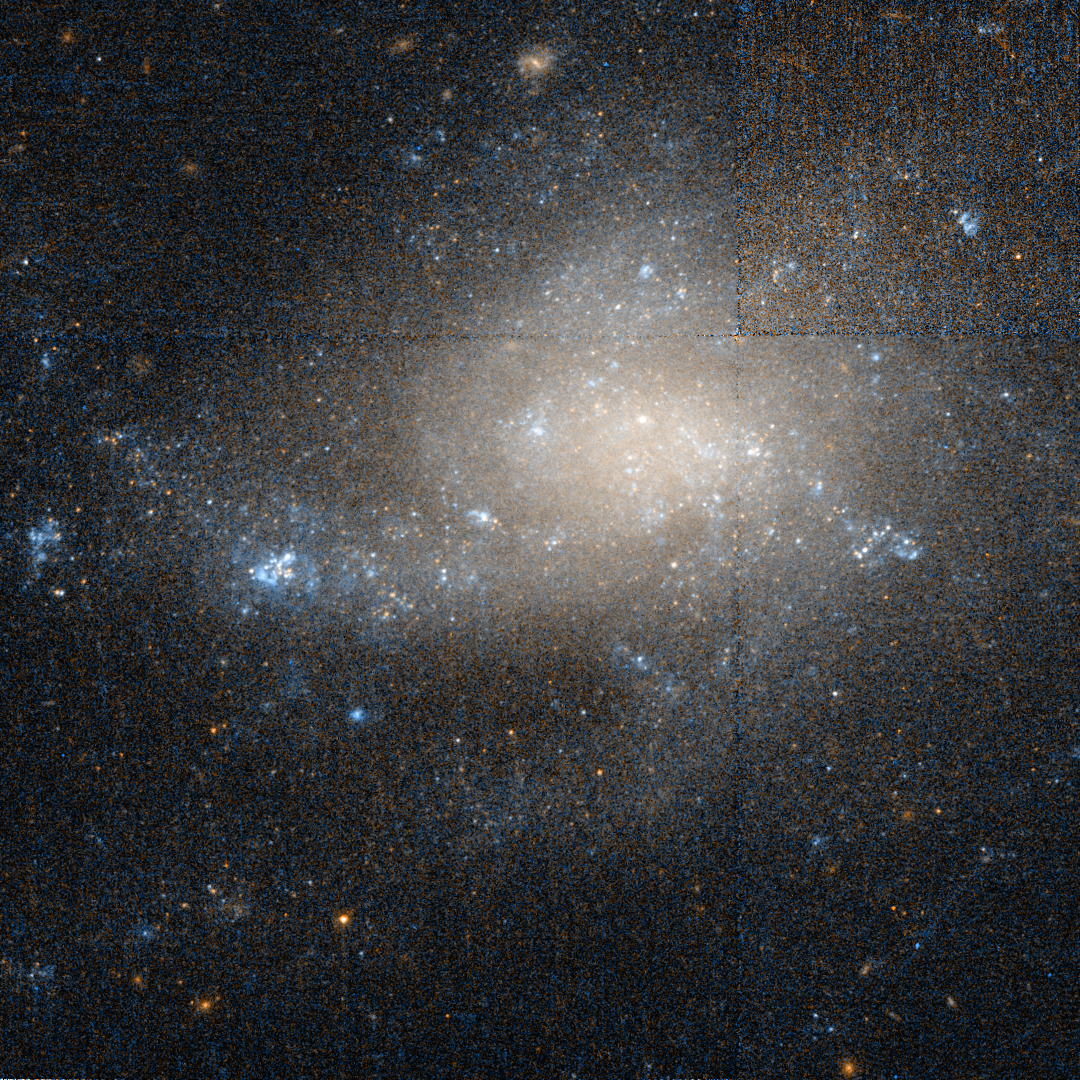
- Hubble Space Telescope image of NGC 4534

Observation data (J2000 epoch)
- Constellation: Canes Venatici
- Right ascension: 12^{h} 34^{m} 05.420^{s}
- Declination: +35° 31′ 06.00″
- Redshift: 0.002734
- Heliocentric radial velocity: 819 km/s
- Distance: 51.92 ± 0.65 Mly (15.92 ± 0.20 Mpc)
- Apparent magnitude (B): 13.20

Characteristics
- Type: SA(s)dm:

Other designations
- UGC 7723, MCG +06-28-010, PGC 41779

NGC 4534 is a spiral galaxy, located in the constellation Canes Venatici. It was discovered on May 1, 1785, by William Herschel, using an 18" reflector telescope.
