= NGC 4455 =

Spiral galaxy in the constellation Coma Berenices

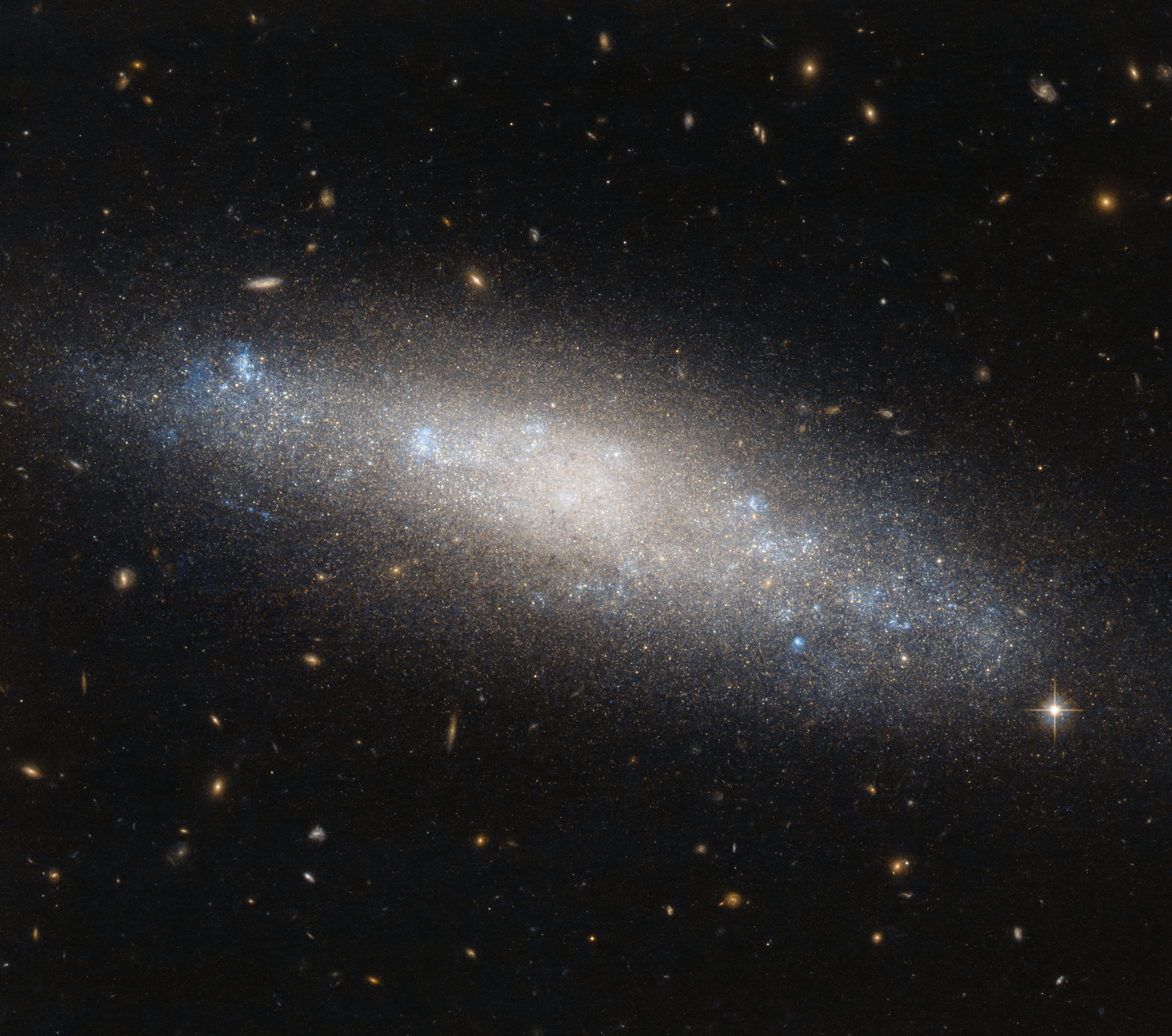
- NGC 4455 taken by Hubble Space Telescope.

Observation data (J2000 epoch)
- Constellation: Coma Berenices
- Right ascension: 12^{h} 28^{m} 44.1266093618^{s}
- Declination: +22° 49′ 13.542101138″
- Redshift: 0.00199
- Heliocentric radial velocity: 596km/s
- Distance: 28.06 million ly
- Apparent magnitude (B): 15.5

Characteristics
- Type: SAdm

Other designations
- CAIRNS J122844.10+224921.0, EVCC 711, HIJASS J1228+22, HIPASS J1228+22, IRAS F12262+2305, IRAS 12262+2305, ISOSS J12287+2249, Ka 390, KUG 1226+231, LEDA 41066, MCG+04-30-001, SDSS J122844.11+224913.5, UGC 7603, UZC J122844.1+224921, Was 57, Z 129-2, Z 1226.2+2306, [DSB94] 127, [SLK2004] 711, [YOF95] 164, Gaia DR2 3953002279065621760

NGC 4455 is a spiral galaxy located in the constellation of Coma Berenices at an approximate distance of 28.06 Mly. NGC 4455 was discovered in 1785 by William Herschel.
