= NGC 4150 =

Galaxy in the constellation Coma Berenices

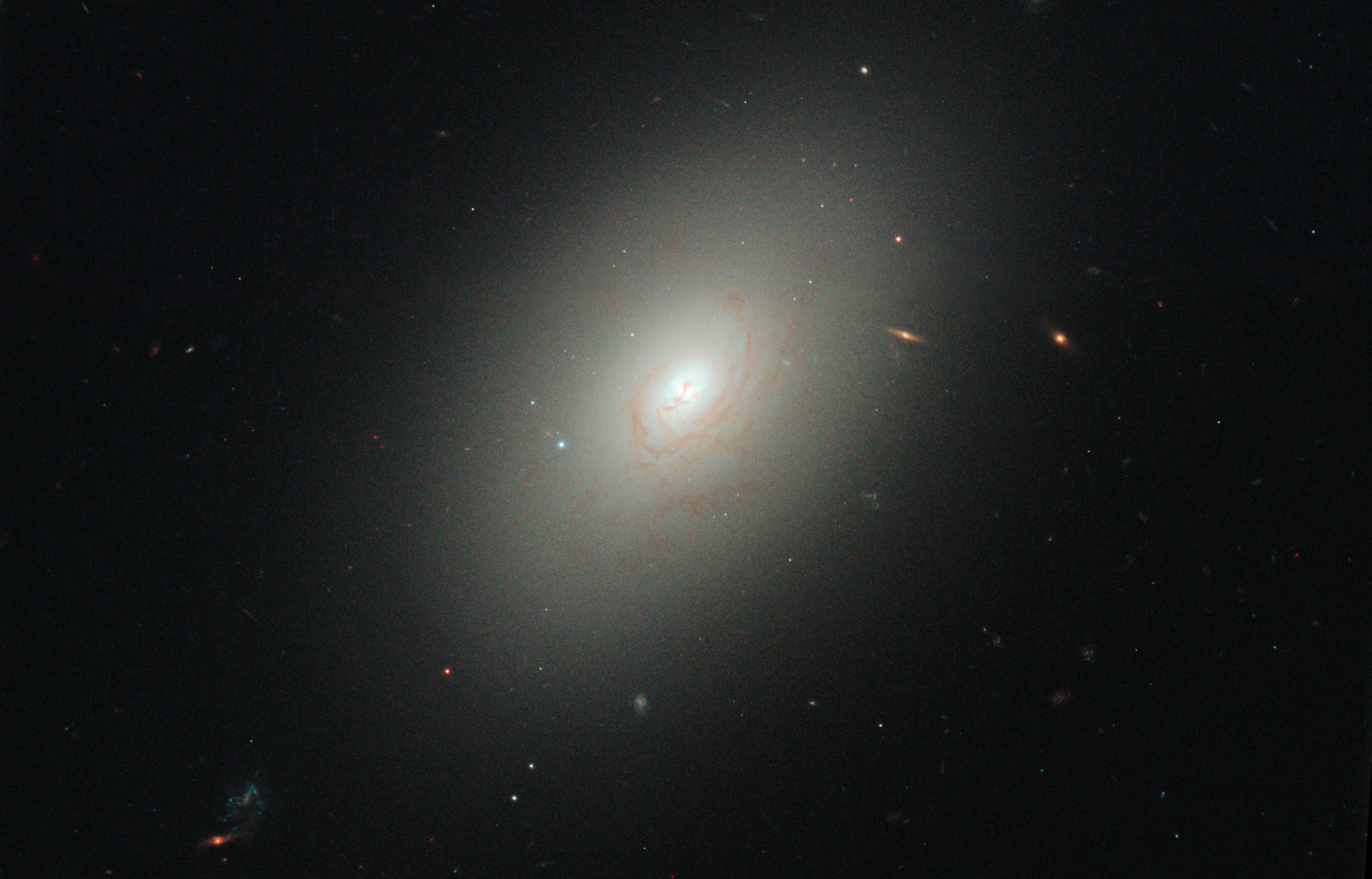
- Hubble Space Telescope image of NGC 4150

Observation data (J2000 epoch)
- Constellation: Coma Berenices
- Right ascension: 12^{h} 10^{m} 33.655^{s}
- Declination: +30° 25′ 05.35″
- Redshift: 0.000694
- Heliocentric radial velocity: 208±5 km/s
- Distance: 42.60 ± 0.46 Mly (13.06 ± 0.14 Mpc)
- Apparent magnitude (V): 11.64
- Apparent magnitude (B): 12.44

Characteristics
- Type: SA(r)0^0^
- Number of stars: 6.3+3.1 −2.1×10^{9} M_{☉}
- Apparent size (V): 2.3′ × 1.6′

Other designations
- 2MASX J12103365+3024053, NGC 4150, LEDA 38742

NGC 4150 is a lenticular galaxy in the constellation of Coma Berenices. It was discovered by German-British astronomer William Herschel on March 13, 1785. This galaxy is located at a distance of 42.6 million light-years (13.06 Mpc) from the Milky Way. It has an apparent visual magnitude of 11.64 and spans an angular size of 2.3′ × 1.6′.

The morphological classification of NGC 4150 is SA0^{0}(r)?, indicating this is a lenticular galaxy with possible ring structure. The galaxy is inclined at an angle of 58° with the long axis aligned along a position angle of 148°. It has a significant reservoir of molecular hydrogen that has a mass in the range (3.8 to 6.6)×10^{7} M_{☉}. The core region is kinematically decoupled from the rest of the galaxy, suggesting a recent merger. This minor merger added around 3×10^{8} M_{☉} to the total mass.

== Gallery ==
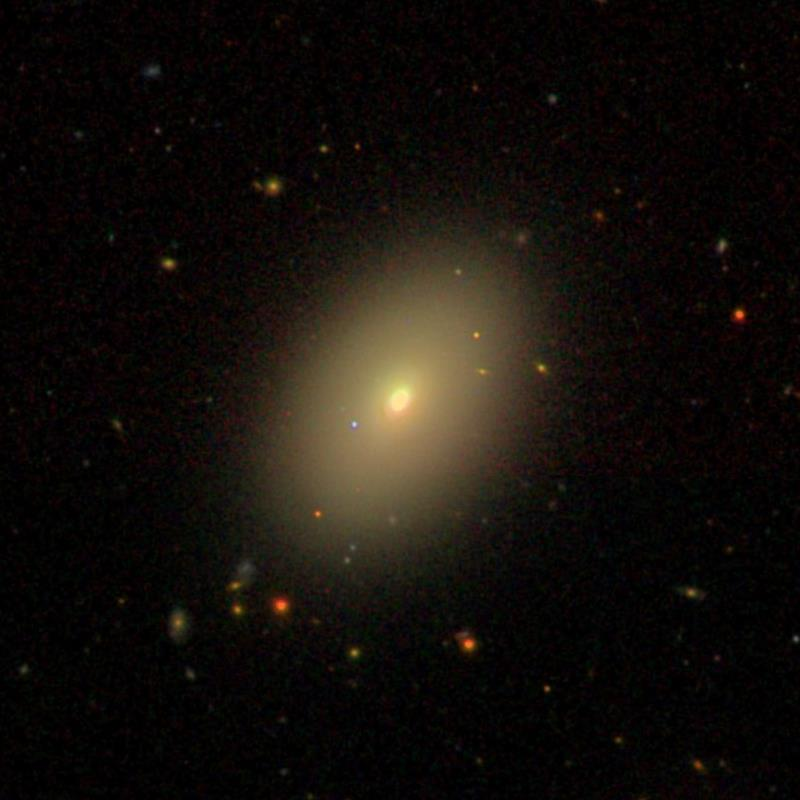
SDSS image of NGC 4150

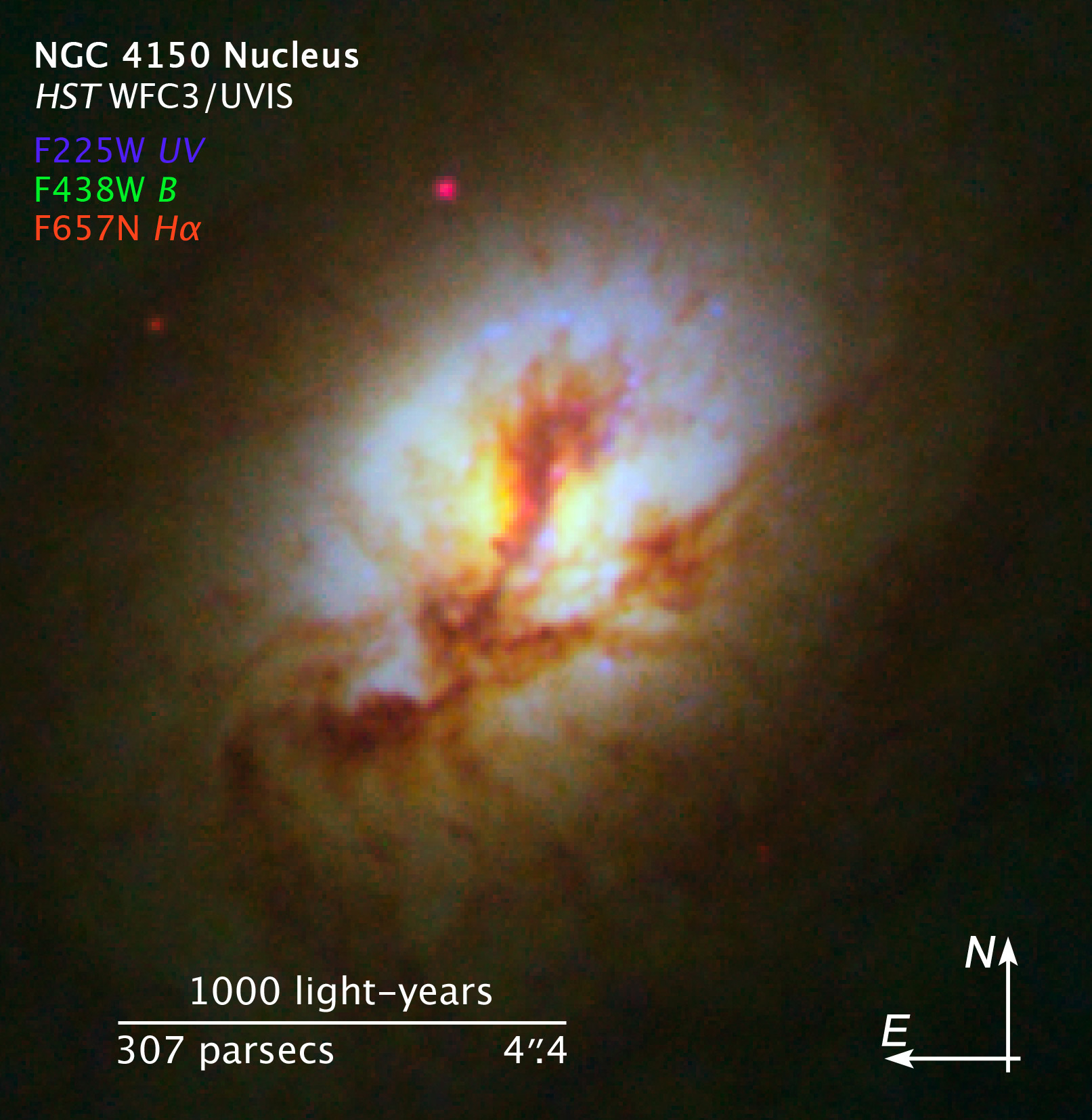
The core of NGC 4150 (HST)
