= NGC 4725 =

Galaxy in the constellation Coma Berenices

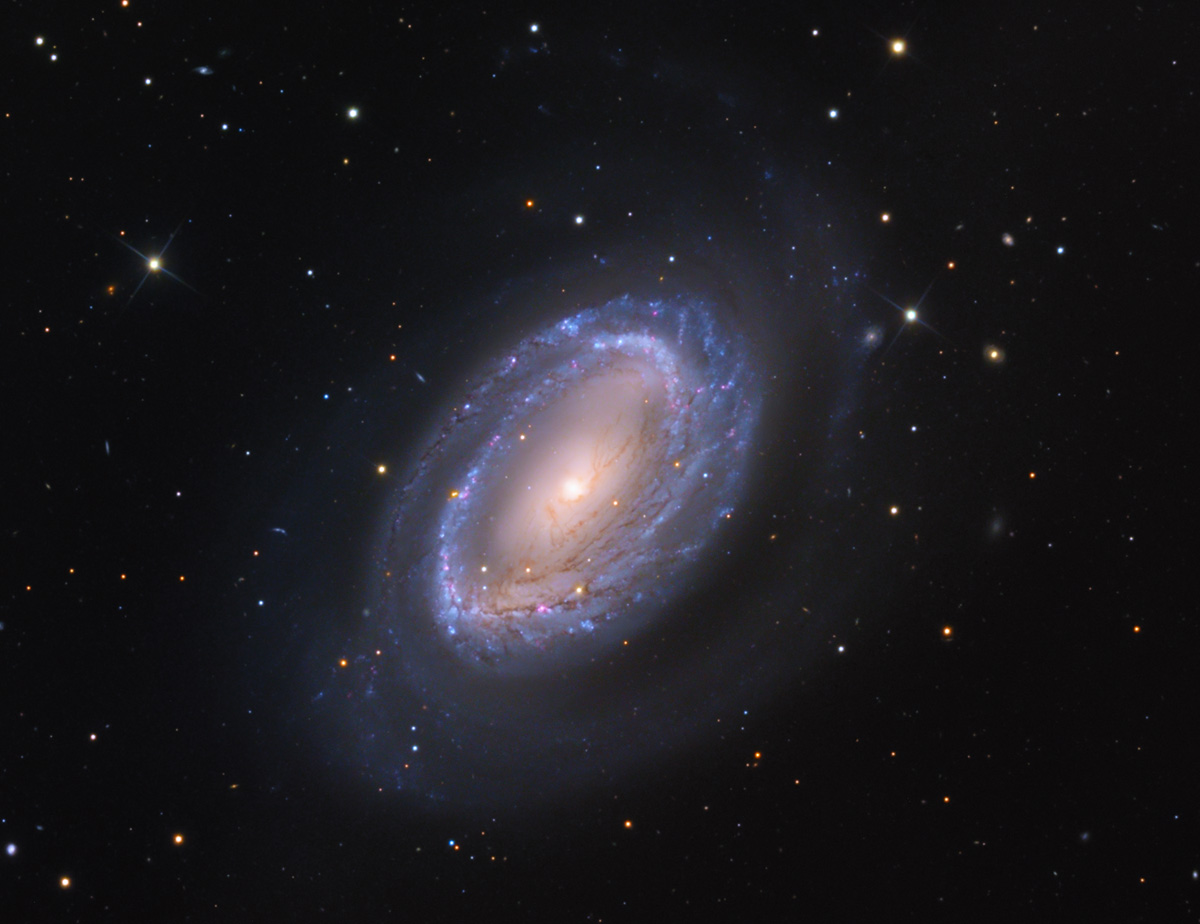
- NGC 4725 imaged by the Mount Lemmon SkyCenter

Observation data (J2000 epoch)
- Constellation: Coma Berenices
- Right ascension: 12^{h} 50^{m} 26.56929^{s}
- Declination: +25° 30′ 02.7376″
- Heliocentric radial velocity: 1,206±3 km/s
- Distance: 40.1 ± 6.2 Mly (12.3 ± 1.9 Mpc)
- Apparent magnitude (V): 10.1

Characteristics
- Type: SAB(r)ab pec or Sb/SB(r)II
- Size: 150,700 ly (46.23 kpc) (estimated)
- Apparent size (V): 9′.77 × 6′.76

Other designations
- IRAS 12480+2547, NGC 4725, UGC 7989, LEDA 43451, PGC 43451

NGC 4725 is an intermediate barred spiral galaxy with a prominent ring structure, located in the northern constellation of Coma Berenices near the north galactic pole. It was discovered by German-born British astronomer William Herschel on April 6, 1785. The galaxy lies at a distance of approximately 40 megalight-years from the Milky Way. NGC 4725 is the brightest member of the Coma I Group of the Coma-Sculptor Cloud, although it is relatively isolated from the other members of this group. This galaxy is strongly disturbed and is interacting with neighboring spiral galaxy NGC 4747, with its spiral arms showing indications of warping. The pair have an angular separation of 24′, which corresponds to a projected linear separation of 370 kly. A tidal plume extends from NGC 4747 toward NGC 4725.

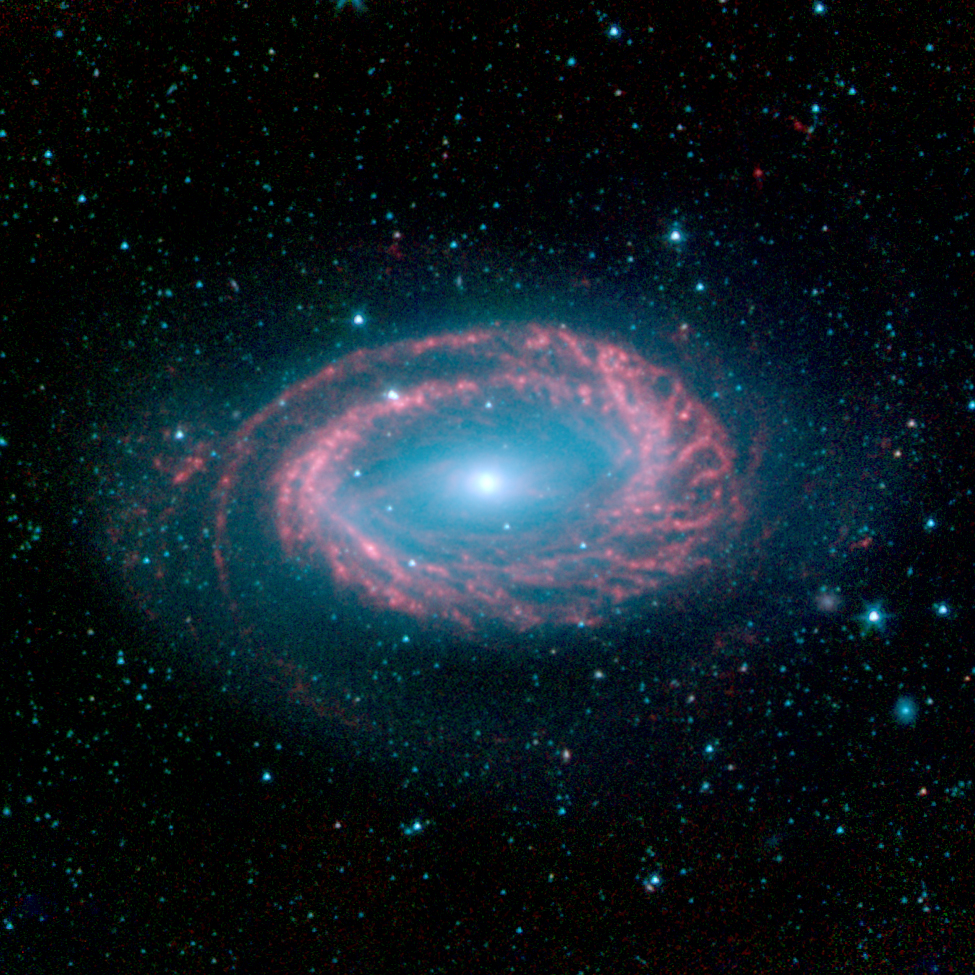
A mid-infrared image of NGC 4725 taken by the Spitzer Space Telescope (SST)

NGC 4725 is a suspected type 2 Seyfert galaxy with a supermassive black hole at the core. The morphological classification of this galaxy is SAB(r)ab pec, indicating a peculiar, weakly-barred spiral galaxy (SAB) with a complete ring surrounding the bar (r) and somewhat tightly-wound spiral arms (ab). It is actually double-barred, a feature found among about a third of all barred spirals. The galactic plane is inclined by approximately 46° to the line of sight from the Earth.

The ring structure of the galaxy is a region of star formation. It is offset from the galactic center and displays non-circular motion. There is a compact radio source positioned approximately 6.2 kly from the nucleus of NGC 4725. Since there is no optical counterpart at that position, this may be a star forming region that is heavily obscured by dust.

== Supernovae ==
Multiple supernova candidate events have been detected in this galaxy:

- SN 1940B was discovered by Josef J. Johnson on a photograph taken May 5, 1940, about 2.5′ northeast of the galactic core. The light curve indicates this was a Type II supernova.
- SN 1969H (Type I, mag. 15) was discovered by Anthony Fairall on 8 July 1969. (Note: Many sources incorrectly report the discovery date as 17 June 1969.)
- Candidate SN 1987E was detected April 24, 1987 with a magnitude of 15.65. Follow-up studies failed to detect this event, and it is believed to be the result of a high proper motion foreground star.
- SN 1999gs (type unknown, mag. 19.3) was discovered by the Lick Observatory Supernova Search (LOSS) on 28 December 1999. It was positioned 3″ west and 105″ south of the nucleus of NGC 4725.
- On automated images taken July 5, 2016, a magnitude 17.0 transient source was discovered at an angular separation of 324″ from the galactic nucleus. Designated ASASSN-16gu (AT 2016cyu), with an estimated absolute visual magnitude of –13.6, it was initially thought to be a supernova. However, it was determined that the sighting was actually Kuiper belt object Makemake, a dwarf planet.
