= NGC 4747 =

Galaxy in the constellation of Coma Berenices

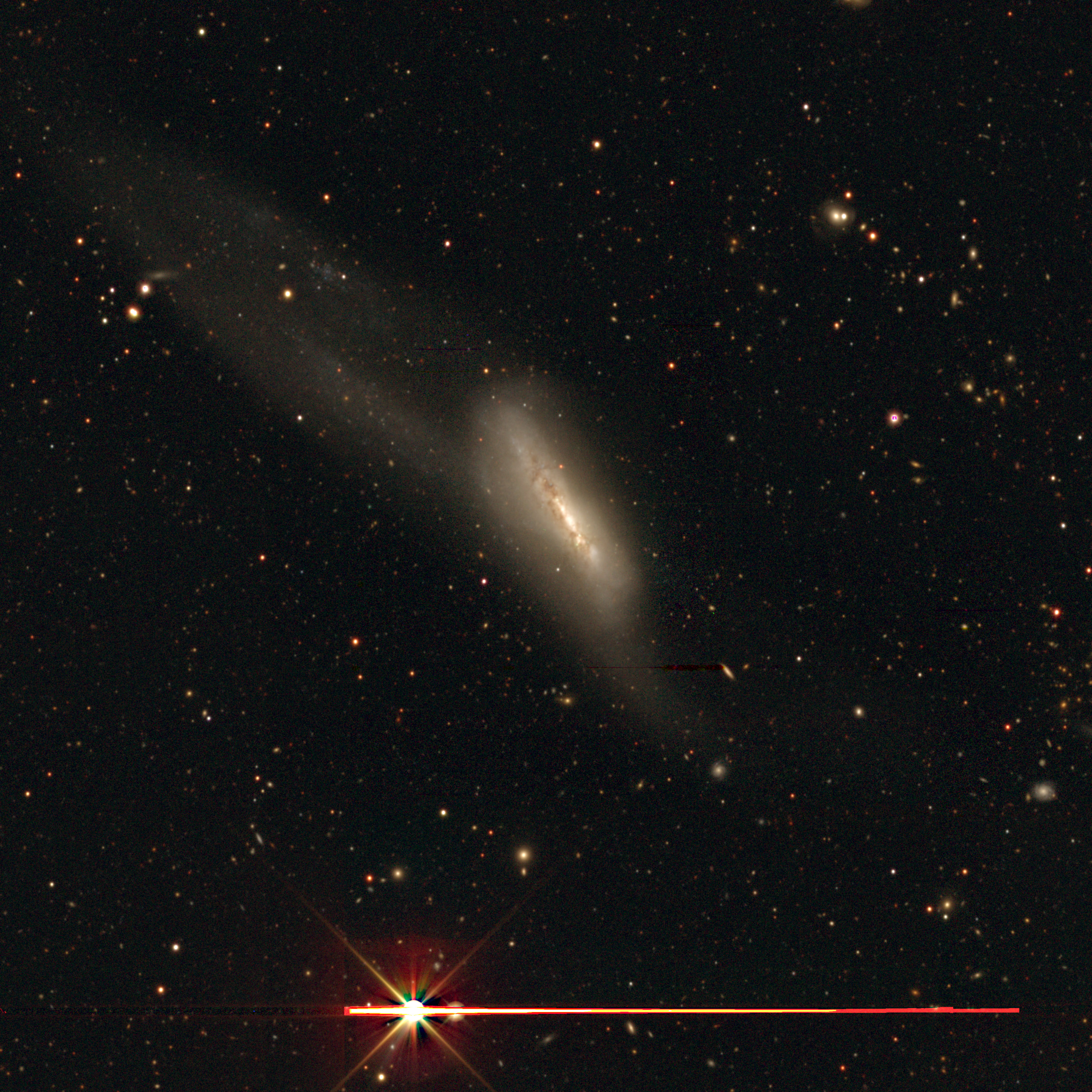
- NGC 4747 by legacy surveys

Observation data (J2000 epoch)
- Constellation: Coma Berenices
- Right ascension: 12^{h} 51^{m} 45.9^{s}
- Declination: +25° 46′ 37″
- Redshift: 0.003969 ± 0.000003
- Heliocentric radial velocity: 1,190 ± 1 km/s
- Distance: 32 Mly (9.8 Mpc)
- Apparent magnitude (V): 12.4

Characteristics
- Type: SBcd? pec
- Apparent size (V): 3.5′ × 1.2′
- Notable features: tidal tail

Other designations
- UGC 8005, Arp 159, CGCG 129-028, MCG +04-30-023, PGC 43586

NGC 4747 is a barred spiral galaxy located in the constellation Coma Berenices. It is located at a distance of about 35 million light years from Earth, which, given its apparent dimensions, means that NGC 4747 is about 35,000 light years across. It was discovered by William Herschel on April 6, 1785. It is included in the Atlas of Peculiar Galaxies in the interior absorption category.

The galaxy is a member of the Coma I Group, which is part of the Local Supercluster. NGC 4747 is interacting with neighboring spiral galaxy NGC 4725, with its spiral arms showing indications of warping. The pair have an angular separation of 24′, which corresponds to a projected linear separation of 370 kly. A close approach between NGC 4747 and the more massive NGC 4725 that took place 320 million years before observed created tidal plumes in NGC 4747.

A short tidal plume extends from NGC 4747 toward NGC 4725, to the south-west, and one more pronounced towards the north-east, with a length of 8 arcminutes. The optical north-east plume has also a hydrogen counterpart, which is offset by 50 degrees from the visual counterpart. Two knots, possibly star clusters, are visible in the northeast plume, that could become tidal dwarf galaxies, as they appear to be massive enough to be self-gravitating.

The star formation rate of the galaxy is estimated to be 0.13 solar masses per year.
