= NGC 4274 =

Galaxy in the constellation Coma Berenices

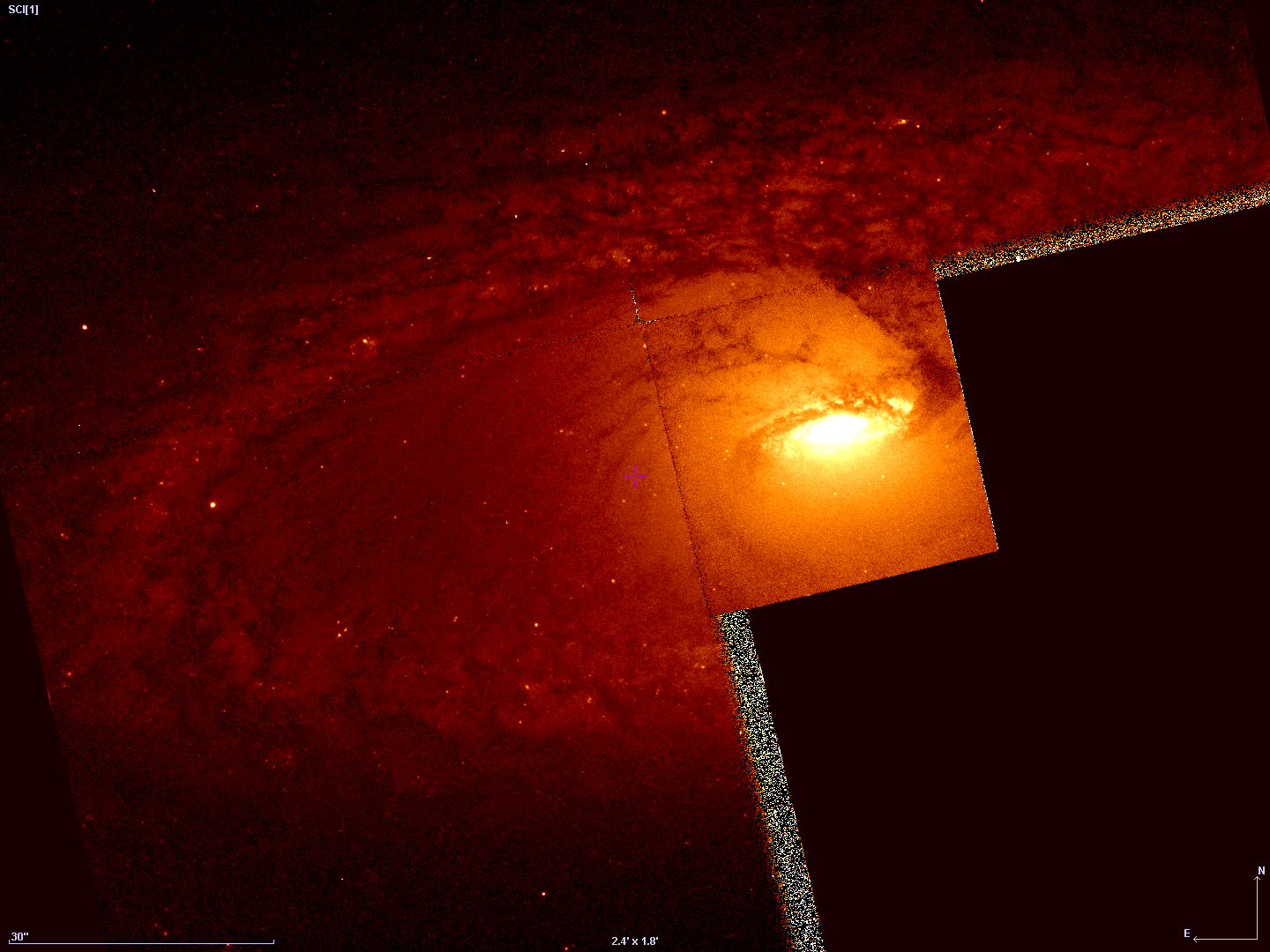
- NGC 4274 imaged by Hubble Space Telescope

Observation data (J2000 epoch)
- Constellation: Coma Berenices
- Right ascension: 12^{h} 19^{m} 50.5963^{s}
- Declination: +29° 36′ 52.912″
- Redshift: 0.003102±0.0000230
- Heliocentric radial velocity: 930±7 km/s
- Distance: 45.37 ± 4.66 Mly (13.911 ± 1.429 Mpc)
- Group or cluster: NGC 4274 group (LGG 279)
- Apparent magnitude (V): 10.5

Characteristics
- Type: (R)SB(r)ab
- Size: ~99,000 ly (30.35 kpc) (estimated)
- Apparent size (V): 6.8′ × 2.5′

Other designations
- IRAS 12173+2953, 2MASX J12195066+2936529, NGC 4274, UGC 7377, MCG +05-29-060, PGC 39724, CGCG 158-071

NGC 4274 is a barred spiral galaxy situated in the constellation of Coma Berenices. It is located at a distance of about 45 million light years from Earth, which, given its apparent dimensions, means that NGC 4274 is about 95,000 light years across. It was discovered by German-British astronomer William Herschel on 13 March 1785.

== Characteristics ==
NGC 4274 is a LINER galaxy, i.e. a galaxy whose nucleus has an emission spectrum characterized by broad lines of weakly ionized atoms.

NGC 4274 is characterised by its overlapping outer arms, forming a ring structure with apparent diameter 2.8′. The inner arms begin near the edge of the bulge and they are bright and dusty, with dust lanes that are more prominent at the near side. Outside the near-ring a set of fainter outer arms has been detected. These outer arms also form a ring, with diameter 5.9′. A third rings exists near the nucleus. The nuclear ring has semimajor axis 9", which corresponds to 680 parsec at that distance.

The bar of the galaxy is 5 kpc long. The galaxy features a nuclear bar that is almost perpendicular to the outer bar.

== Nearby galaxies ==
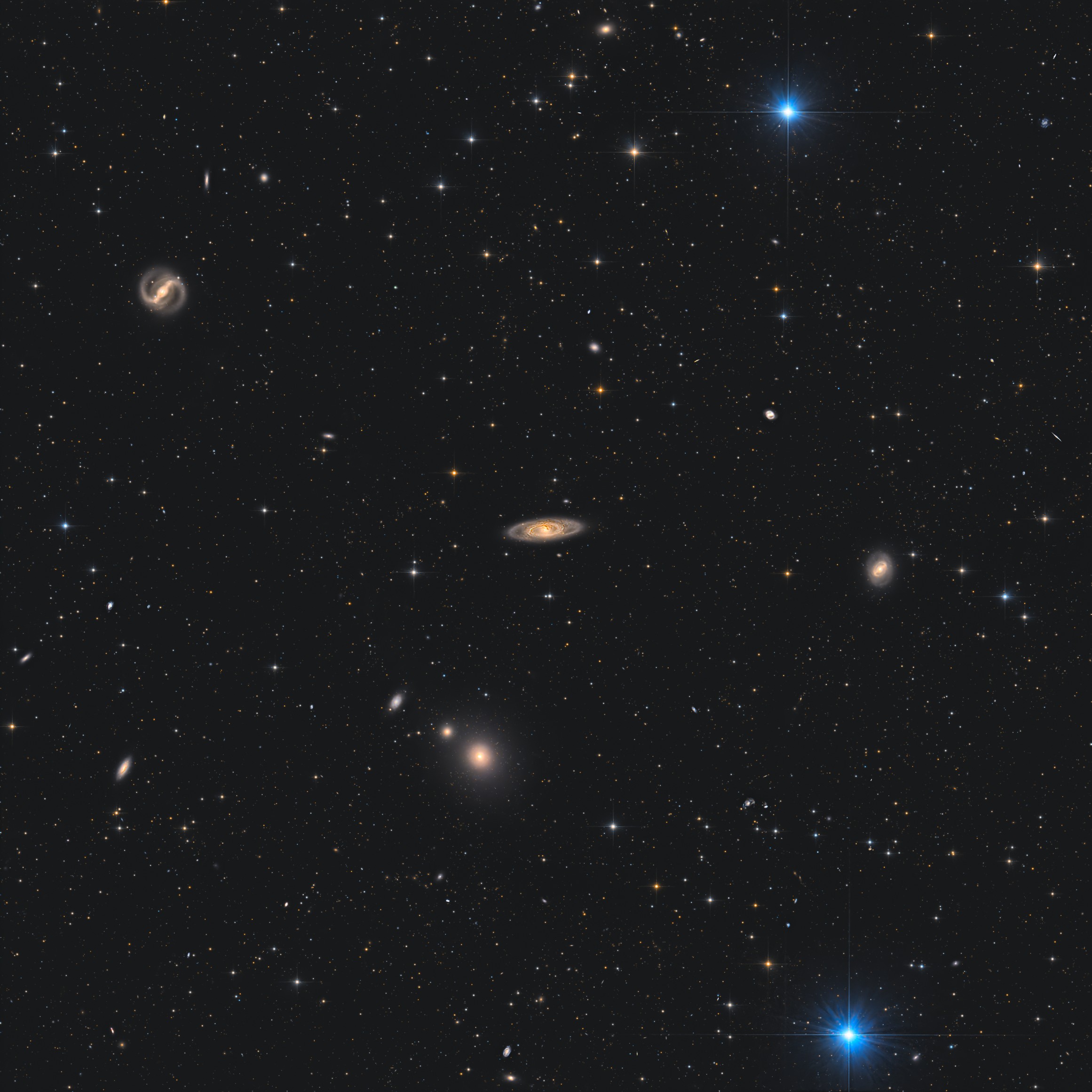
The NGC 4274 Group

NGC 4274 is the foremost member of a galaxy group known as NGC 4274 group. Other members of the group are NGC 4173, NGC 4245, NGC 4251, NGC 4283, IC 3215, NGC 4310, and NGC 4314. It is part of the Coma I Group which is part of the Virgo Supercluster.

== Supernova ==
One supernova has been observed in NGC 4274:

- SN 1999ev (Type II, mag. 14.4) was discovered by Scottish amateur astronomer Tom Boles on 7 November 1999.

== Gallery ==
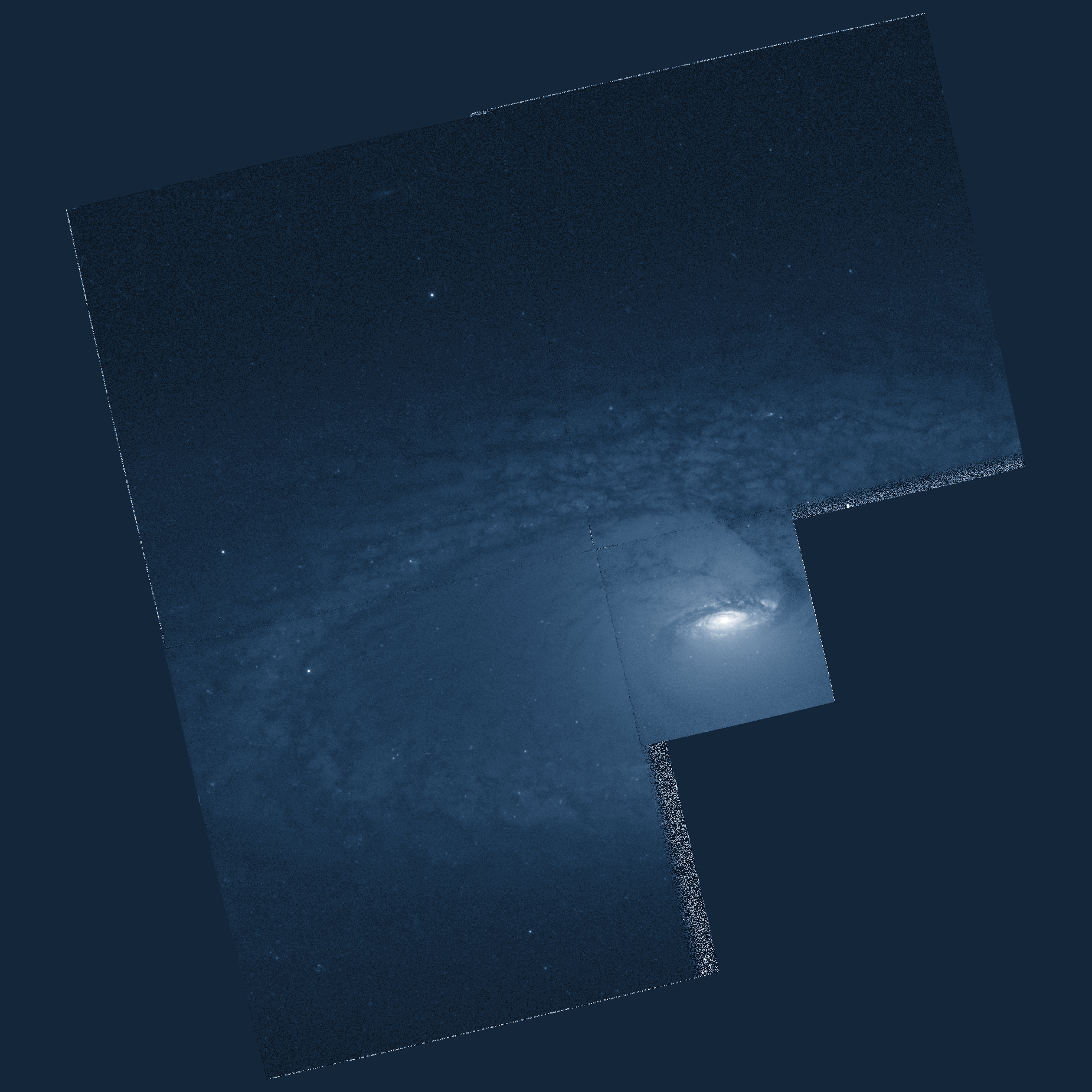
NGC 4274 (HST)

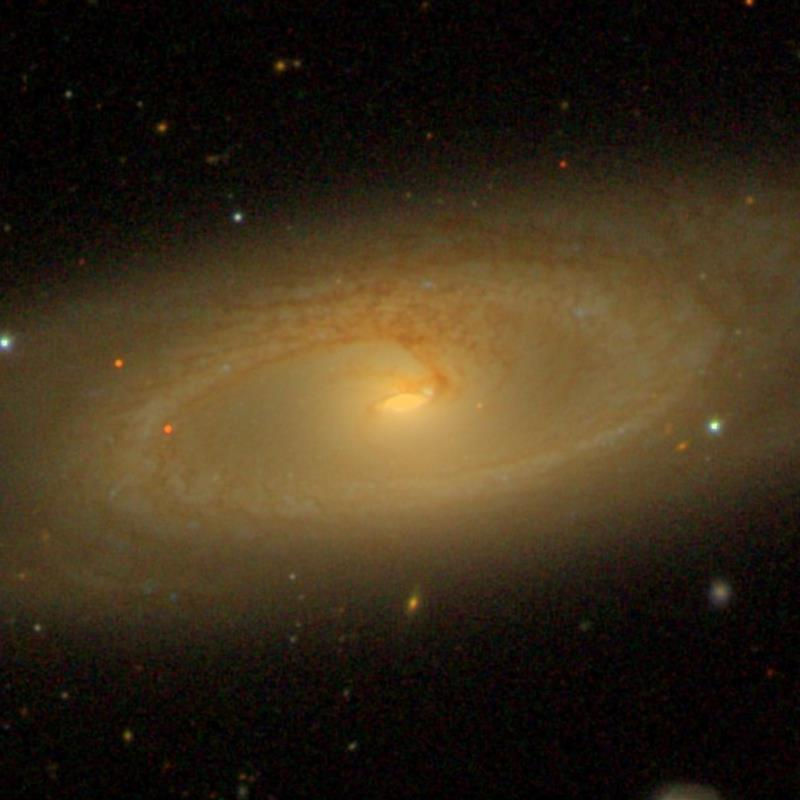
NGC 4274 (SDSS DR14)
