= NGC 4359 =

Galaxy in the constellation Coma Berenices

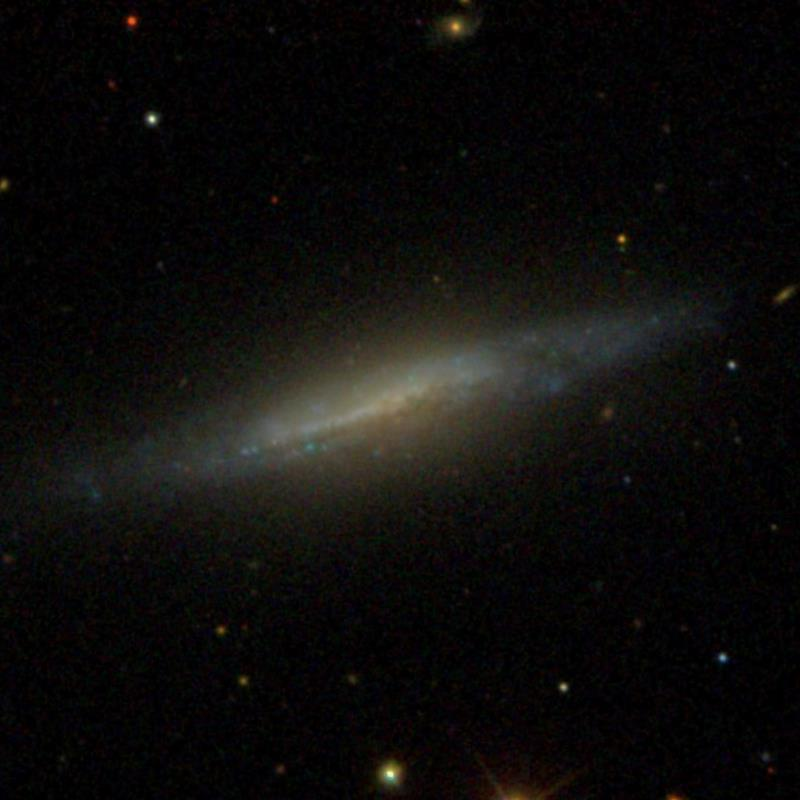
- SDSS image of NGC 4359.

Observation data (J2000 epoch)
- Constellation: Coma Berenices
- Right ascension: 12^{h} 24^{m} 11.2^{s}
- Declination: 31° 31′ 19″
- Redshift: 0.004179
- Heliocentric radial velocity: 1253 km/s
- Distance: 56.21 Mly (17.233 Mpc)
- Group or cluster: Coma I (NGC 4274 subgroup)
- Apparent magnitude (V): 13.6

Characteristics
- Type: SB(rs)c?+
- Size: ~27,100 ly (8.32 kpc) (estimated)
- Apparent size (V): 2.57 x 0.80

Other designations
- UGC 07483, PGC 040330, MCG +05-29-079

NGC 4359 is a dwarf barred spiral galaxy seen edge-on that is about 56 million light-years away in the constellation Coma Berenices. It was discovered by astronomer William Herschel on March 20, 1787. It is a member of the NGC 4274 Group, which is part of the Coma I Group or Cloud.

On the sky, NGC 4359 appears to lie closest to the flocculent spiral NGC 4414 which is also a member of the NGC 4274 Group and the Coma I cloud. However, their radial velocities differ by around 500 km/s suggesting an interaction between the two is unlikely.

== See also ==
- List of NGC objects (4001–5000)
- NGC 4414
- Coma I
