= NGC 4310 =

Dwarf spiral galaxy in the constellation Coma Berenices

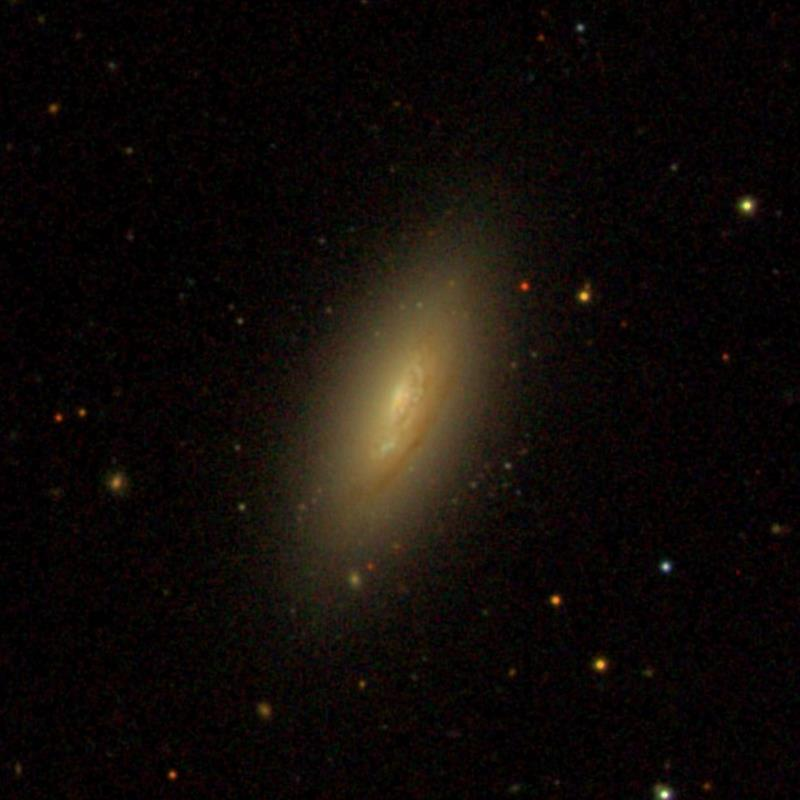
- SDSS image of NGC 4310.

Observation data (J2000 epoch)
- Constellation: Coma Berenices
- Right ascension: 12^{h} 22^{m} 26.3^{s}
- Declination: 29° 12′ 33″
- Redshift: 0.003062
- Heliocentric radial velocity: 918 km/s
- Distance: 54 Mly (16.5 Mpc)
- Group or cluster: Coma I (NGC 4274 subgroup)
- Apparent magnitude (V): 13.22
- Absolute magnitude (V): -17.37

Characteristics
- Type: (R')SAB0^+(r)?
- Mass: 0.8×10^{9} (Stellar mass)/5×10^{9} (Total Mass) M_{☉}
- Size: ~18,900 ly (5.79 kpc) (estimated)
- Apparent size (V): 2.2 x 1.2

Other designations
- NGC 4338, UGC 07440, CGCG 158-092, MCG +05-29-074, PGC 040086

NGC 4310 is a dwarf spiral galaxy with a dust lane and ring structure located about 54 million light-years away in the constellation Coma Berenices. It was discovered by astronomer William Herschel on April 11, 1785. It was rediscovered by astronomer Heinrich d'Arrest on May 19, 1863, and was later listed as NGC 4338. The galaxy is host to a supermassive black hole with an estimated mass of 10^{7} solar masses.

NGC 4310 is a member of the Coma I group and is located in a subgroup surrounding the galaxy NGC 4274. The two galaxies, NGC 4310 and NGC 4274 form a pair and are separated by a projected distance of around 500,000 ly (154 kpc).

== See also ==
- List of NGC objects (4001–5000)
- Coma I
