= NGC 4203 =

Galaxy in the constellation Coma Berenices

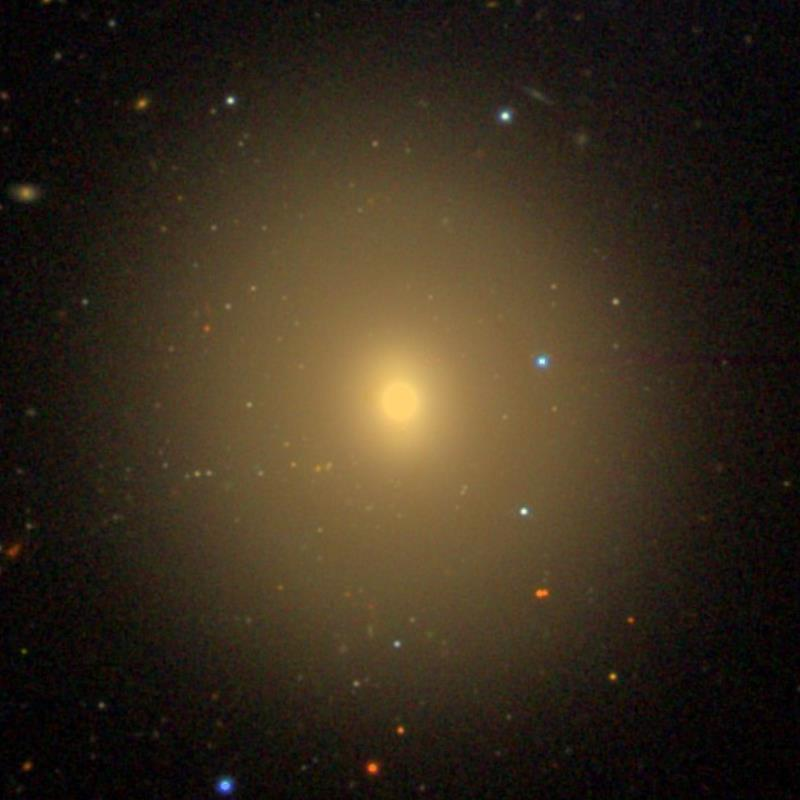
- NGC 4203 (SDSS)

Observation data (J2000 epoch)
- Constellation: Coma Berenices
- Right ascension: 12^{h} 15^{m} 05.0^{s}
- Declination: +33° 11′ 50″
- Redshift: 0.003620
- Heliocentric radial velocity: 1,083 km/s
- Galactocentric velocity: 1,093 km/s
- Distance: 49.84 ± 0.46 Mly (15.28 ± 0.14 Mpc)
- Group or cluster: Coma I
- Apparent magnitude (V): 11.99
- Apparent magnitude (B): 12.98

Characteristics
- Type: SAB0−
- Apparent size (V): 2.467′ × 2.319′

Other designations
- 2MASX J12150502+3311500, LEDA 39158, UGC 7256, UZC J121505.0+331152, Z 187-29 .

NGC 4203 is the New General Catalogue identifier for a lenticular galaxy in the northern constellation of Coma Berenices. It was discovered on March 20, 1787 by English astronomer William Herschel, and is situated 5.5° to the northwest of the 4th magnitude star Gamma Comae Berenices and can be viewed with a small telescope. The morphological classification of NGC 4203 is SAB0−, indicating that it has a lenticular form with tightly wound spiral arms and a weak bar structure at the nucleus.

This galaxy has a fairly large reservoir of neutral hydrogen containing on the order of a billion solar masses (M_{☉}), but it is only undergoing a low rate of new star formation. Hence, the inner star formation of the galaxy is fairly old; roughly ten billion years on average. The neutral hydrogen is arranged in two ring-like structures, with the outer ring having nine times the mass of the inner. In the central region there is around 2.5×10^{7} M_{☉} of molecular hydrogen, plus dust structures within 980 ly (300 pc) of the nucleus. The gas in the outer disk may have been accreted from the inter-galactic medium, or captured during a close encounter with a dwarf galaxy.

The nucleus of the galaxy contains a low-ionization nuclear emission-line region of type 1.9. This is being generated by a supermassive black hole of an estimated (6±1)×10^{7} M_{☉}. An influx of gas of around 2×10^{−2} M_{☉}/yr is sufficient to explain the measured X-ray luminosity. The time-varying emissions from the region are perhaps best explained by an infalling red supergiant star that is losing mass to the black hole along a contrail.

NGC 4203 is a member of the Coma I Group which is part of the Virgo Supercluster.
