= NGC 4314 =

Galaxy in the constellation Coma Berenices

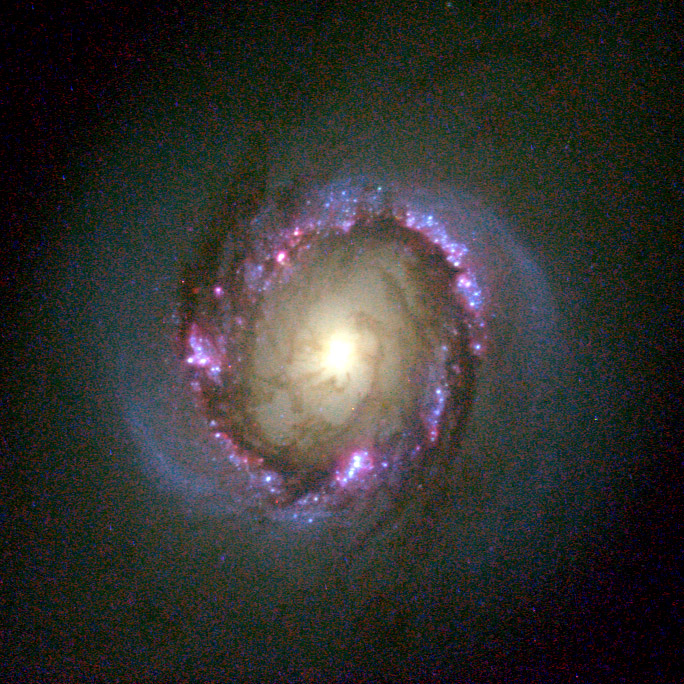
- Circumnuclear starbust ring of NGC 4314

Observation data (J2000 epoch)
- Constellation: Coma Berenices
- Right ascension: 12^{h} 22^{m} 31.978^{s}
- Declination: +29° 53′ 43.09″
- Heliocentric radial velocity: 983±5 km/s
- Distance: 53.2 ± 2.9 Mly (16.3 ± 0.9 Mpc)
- Group or cluster: Coma I
- Apparent magnitude (V): 11.4

Characteristics
- Type: SB(rs)a or SBa
- Apparent size (V): 2′.8 × 1′.4 (NIR)
- Notable features: Circumnuclear ring

Other designations
- IRAS 12200+3010, LEDA 40097, NGC 4314, UGC 7443, PGC 40097

NGC 4314 is a barred spiral galaxy approximately 53 million light-years away in the northern constellation of Coma Berenices. It is positioned around 3° to the north and slightly west of the star Gamma Comae Berenices and is visible in a small telescope. The galaxy was discovered by German-born astronomer William Herschel on March 13, 1785. It was labelled as peculiar by Allan Sandage in 1961 because of the unusual structure in the center of the bar. NGC 4314 is a member of the Coma I group of galaxies.

The morphological classification of this galaxy is SBa, which indicates a barred spiral galaxy (SB) with very tightly wound spiral arms (a). It is inclined at an angle of 21° to the line of sight from the Earth, and the primary bar is oriented with a position angle of 158°. The bar extends out to a diameter of 76″ before joining the spiral arms. These trail in 130° arcs out to a radius of 125″ from the nucleus. Outside the nuclear region, the galaxy is considered generally gas-poor, with no H II regions in the outer spiral arms.

There is a prominent ring of star formation about the galactic nucleus with a radius of 9″. 76 open clusters of stars have been found associated with this ring, and these are probably due, at least in part, to Lindblad resonance. Most of these clusters are 15 million years old or less. The current burst of galactic star formation is estimated to have lasted 30 million years. External to the ring, the stars are generally older than within the ring structure, suggesting a previous epoch of star formation.

== See also ==
- AINUR
- NGC 1512
