= NGC 4245 =

Galaxy in the constellation Coma Berenices

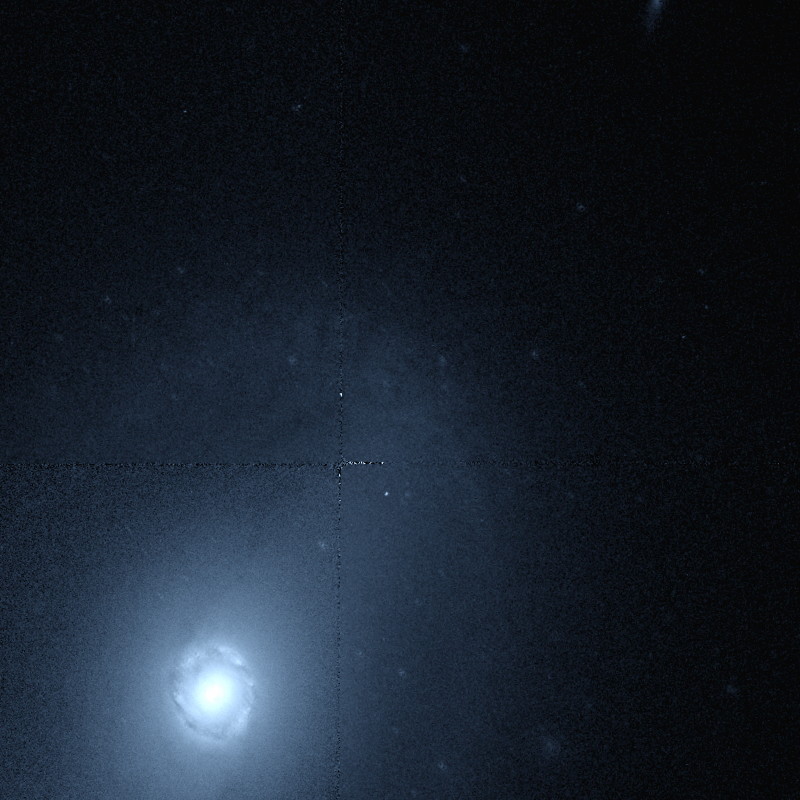
- Hubble Space Telescope image of NGC 4245

Observation data (J2000 epoch)
- Constellation: Coma Berenices
- Right ascension: 12^{h} 17^{m} 36.78283^{s}
- Declination: +29° 36′ 28.9010″
- Redshift: 0.002719
- Heliocentric radial velocity: 814 ± 39 km/s
- Distance: 37 Mly (11.4 Mpc)
- Apparent magnitude (V): 11.42
- Apparent magnitude (B): 12.33

Characteristics
- Type: SB(r)0/a
- Apparent size (V): 76.8″

Other designations
- UGC 7328, MCG +05-29-049, PGC 39437

NGC 4245 is a barred lenticular galaxy with a ring located in the constellation Coma Berenices. It was discovered on March 13, 1785, by the astronomer William Herschel. It is a member of the Coma I Group.
