= NGC 4414 =

Galaxy in the constellation Coma Berenices

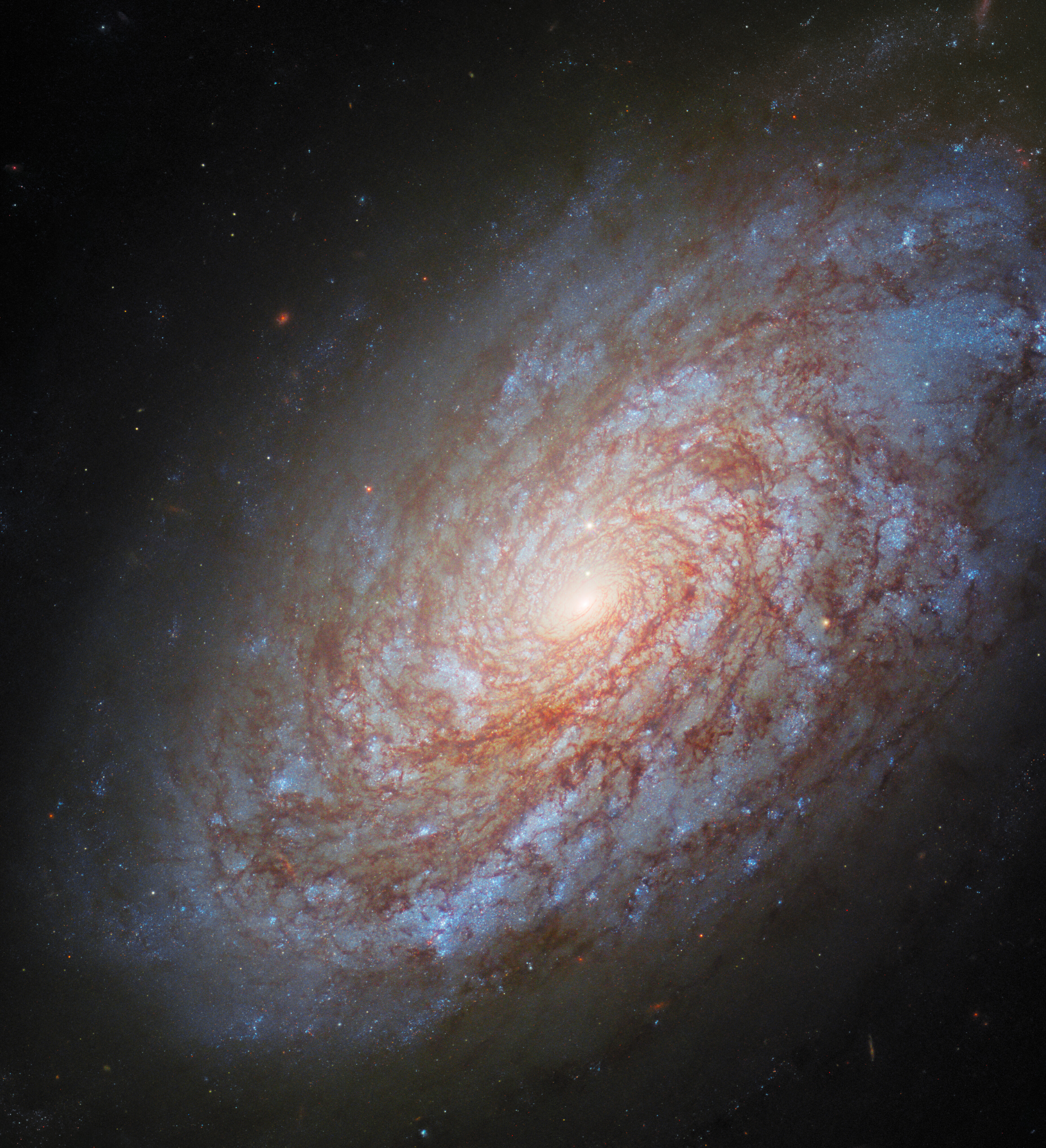
- NGC 4414 as observed by the Hubble Space Telescope (HST)

Observation data (J2000 epoch)
- Constellation: Coma Berenices
- Right ascension: 12^{h} 26^{m} 27.1491^{s}
- Declination: +31° 13′ 24.694″
- Redshift: 716±6 km/s
- Distance: 62.3 Mly (19.1 Mpc)
- Apparent magnitude (V): 10.3

Characteristics
- Type: SA(rs)c
- Size: 82,500 ly (25.3 kpc) (estimated)
- Apparent size (V): 4.4′ × 3.0′

Other designations
- ARK 365, IRAS 12239+3129, NGC 4414, UGC 7539, MCG +05-29-085, PGC 40692, CGCG 158-108, SDSS J122627.12+311324.5

NGC 4414, also known as the Dusty Spiral Galaxy, is an unbarred spiral galaxy about 62 million light-years away in the constellation Coma Berenices. It was discovered by German-British astronomer William Herschel on 13 March 1785. NGC 4414 is a flocculent spiral galaxy, with short segments of spiral structure but without the dramatic well-defined spiral arms of a grand design spiral. It is a member of the Coma I Group, a group of galaxies lying physically close to the Virgo Cluster.

The galaxy was imaged by the Hubble Space Telescope in 1995, as part of the HST's main mission to determine the distance to galaxies, and again in 1999 as part of the Hubble Heritage project. It has been part of an ongoing effort to study its Cepheid variable stars. The outer arms appear blue due to the continuing formation of young stars and include a possible luminous blue variable with an absolute magnitude of −10.

NGC 4414 is also an isolated galaxy without signs of past interactions with other galaxies and despite not being a starburst galaxy shows a high density and richness of gas – both atomic and molecular, with the former extending far beyond its optical disk.

== Supernovae ==
Four supernovae have been observed in NGC 4414:

- SN 1974G (Type I, mag. 13) was discovered by Miss W. Burgat on 20 April 1974.
- SN 2013df (Type IIb, mag. 14.4) was discovered by the Italian Supernovae Search Project on 7 June 2013.
- SN 2021J (Type Ia, mag. 12) was discovered by the Automatic Learning for the Rapid Classification of Events (ALeRCE) on 1 January 2021.
- SN 2023hlf (Type II, mag. 17.8) was discovered by the Zwicky Transient Facility on 1 May 2023.

== Image gallery ==
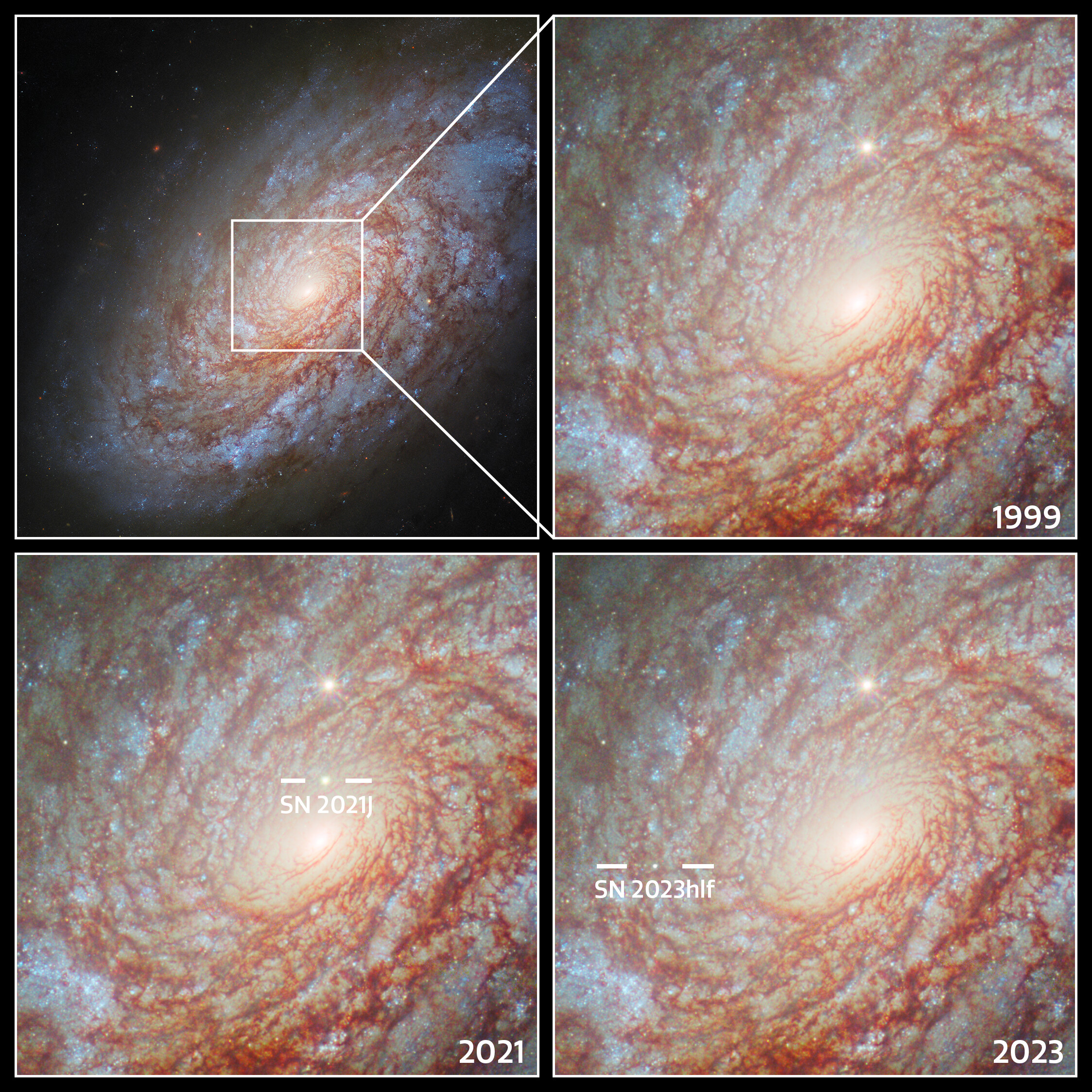
Hubble Space Telescope image of NGC 4414, showing SN 2021J and SN 2023hlf.
