= 3C 275.1 =

Quasar in the constellation of Coma Berenices

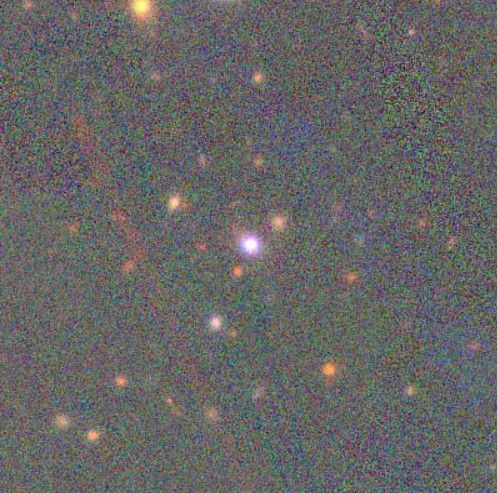
- The quasar 3C 275.1.

Observation data (J2000.0 epoch)
- Constellation: Coma Berenices
- Right ascension: 12^{h} 43^{m} 57.6490^{s}
- Declination: +16° 22′ 53.394″
- Redshift: 0.555225
- Heliocentric radial velocity: 166,452 km/s
- Distance: 5.260 Gly
- Apparent magnitude (V): 19.00
- Apparent magnitude (B): 19.23

Characteristics
- Type: Opt. var.
- Notable features: Large emission nebula surrounding a quasar

Other designations
- DA 330, PKS 1241+166, LEDA 2819359, QSO B1241+1639, 4C 16.34, NRAO 406, S3 1241+16

3C 275.1 is a quasar located in the constellation of Coma Berenices with a redshift of (z) 0.555. It was first discovered in 1986 by astronomers, and is situated in the center of a rich galaxy cluster. Its host is classified as a giant elliptical galaxy, described as either a proto-cD or Type-cD galaxy with an emission nebula surrounding it.

== Description ==
3C 275.1 is classified as a gamma-ray lobe-dominated quasar. It has a radio structure consisting of an elongated core with a narrow jet heading in northwards direction based on a super-resolved radio imaging made by the Very Long Baseline Array (VLBA). Radio mapping at 15 GHz with a 5-kilometer telescope shows 3C 275.1 to contain a double component showing one side as compact and the other being slightly extended. A study also described the southern component of the quasar as distorted, indicating the quasar is strongly interacting with a companion galaxy.

Observations made in 1986 revealed the presence of a rotating gas cloud around 3C 275.1 with a diameter of more than 100 kiloparsecs (Kpc). Based on observations, it was found to be the largest known to surround a quasar and is likely remnants created by tidal interactions or material that is accumulated via cooling flows originating from the cluster. A more detailed study published in 2024, showed the cloud to be a nebula, containing ionized gas tails that extends up to 170 kiloparsecs, typical of Jellyfish galaxies. The nebula is described as having a conical shape with a bar-shaped extension that is located southwards from the nucleus with an extended component having an X-ray emission of 7.6 × 10^{43} erg s^{−1}.

In the center of 3C 275.1, there is a supermassive black hole estimated to have a mass of about 200 million solar masses based on a black hole-spheroid mass ratio calculated for active galactic nuclei. The quasar itself is paired with the nearby galaxy NGC 4651, due to the radio emitter alignment at the rear of the latter's outer galactic disk.
