= NGC 5217 =

Galaxy in the constellation Coma Berenices

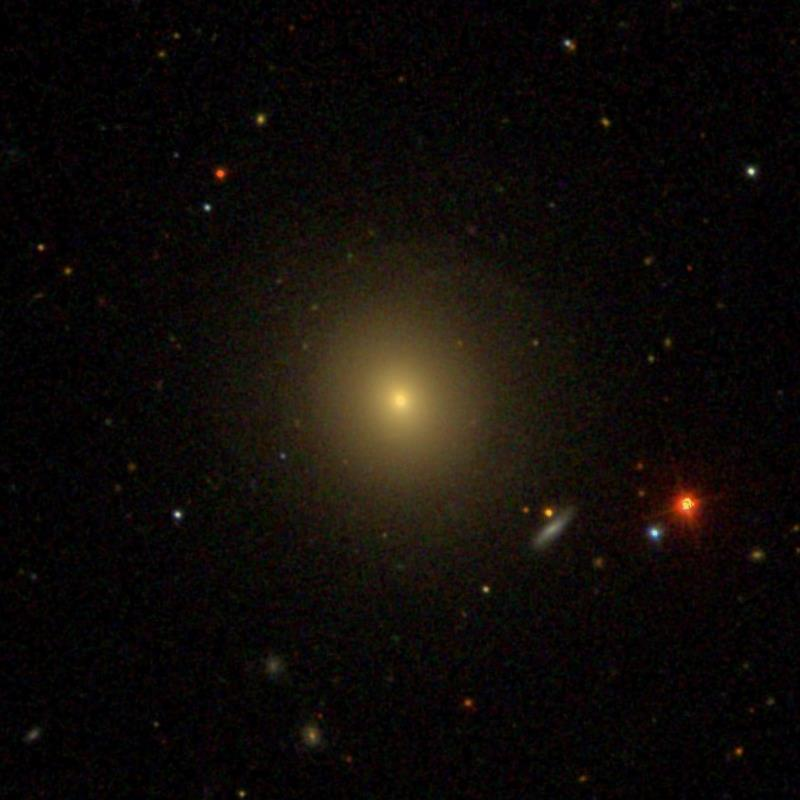

Observation data
- Constellation: Coma Berenices
- Right ascension: 13^{h} 35^{m} 21^{s}
- Declination: +17° 43′ 27″
- Apparent magnitude (B): 14
- Surface brightness: 23.76 mag/arcsec^{2}
- magnitude (J): 10.82
- magnitude (H): 10.08
- magnitude (K): 9.8

NGC 5217 is an elliptical galaxy located about 375 million light-years away in the constellation Coma Berenices. It was discovered on May 7, 1826, by the astronomer John Herschel.
