= NGC 5172 =

Galaxy in the constellation Coma Berenices

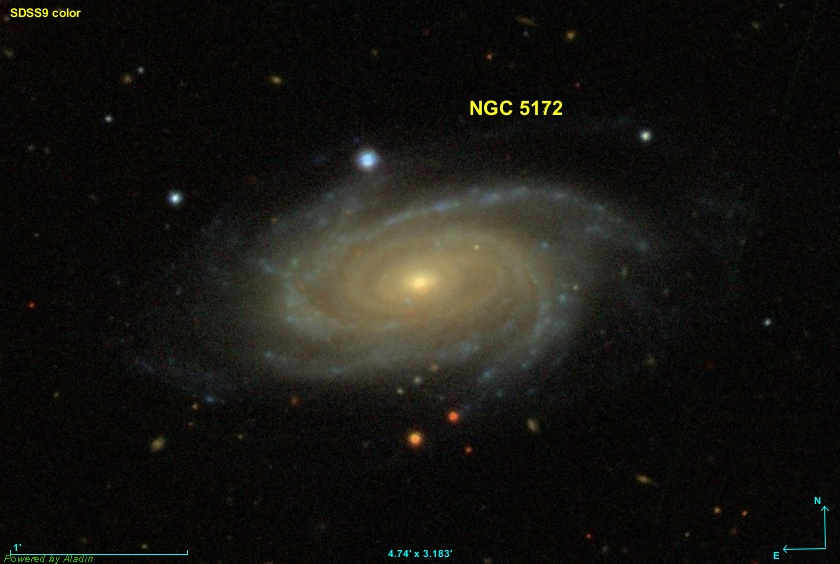
- NGC 5172 imaged by SDSS

Observation data (J2000 epoch)
- Constellation: Coma Berenices
- Right ascension: 12^{h} 29^{m} 19.3104^{s}
- Declination: +17° 03′ 06.901″
- Redshift: 0.013443±0.00000300
- Heliocentric radial velocity: 4,030±1 km/s
- Distance: 164.63 ± 11.65 Mly (50.477 ± 3.572 Mpc)
- Apparent magnitude (V): 12.63

Characteristics
- Type: SAB(rs)bc
- Size: ~167,600 ly (51.39 kpc) (estimated)
- Apparent size (V): 3.3′ × 1.7′

Other designations
- IRAS 13268+1718, 2MASX J13291914+1703061, UGC 8477, MCG +03-34-041, PGC 47330, CGCG 101-057

NGC 5172 is an intermediate spiral galaxy in the constellation of Coma Berenices. Its velocity with respect to the cosmic microwave background is 4,308±19 km/s, which corresponds to a Hubble distance of 207.2 ± 14.5 Mly (63.53 ± 4.46 Mpc). However, 13 non-redshift measurements give a closer mean distance of 164.63 ± 11.65 Mly (50.477 ± 3.572 Mpc). It was discovered by British astronomer John Herschel on 7 May 1826.

NGC 5172 has a possible active galactic nucleus, i.e. it has a compact region at the center of a galaxy that emits a significant amount of energy across the electromagnetic spectrum, with characteristics indicating that this luminosity is not produced by the stars.

According to Abraham Mahtessian, NGC 5172 and NGC 5190 form a pair of galaxies.

== Supernovae ==
Two supernovae have been observed in NGC 5172:

- SN 1998cc (Type Ib, mag. 18.1) was discovered by the Lick Observatory Supernova Search (LOSS) on 15 May 1998.
- SN 2001R (Type II, mag. 18.5) was discovered by LOTOSS (Lick Observatory and Tenagra Observatory Supernova Searches) on 6 January 2001.

== See also ==
- List of NGC objects (5001–6000)
