= 23 Comae Berenices =

Binary star system in the constellation Coma Berenices

- 23 Comae Berenices (circled) in the constellation Coma Berenices

Observation data Epoch J2000 Equinox ICRS
- Constellation: Coma Berenices
- Right ascension: 12^{h} 34^{m} 51.08058^{s}
- Declination: +22° 37′ 45.3303″
- Apparent magnitude (V): 4.80 (4.96 + 6.90)

Characteristics
- Spectral type: A0IV
- U−B color index: −0.01
- B−V color index: +0.012±0.015

Astrometry
Radial velocity (R_{v})	−16.0±1.8 km/s
Proper motion (μ)	RA: −58.89 mas/yr Dec.: 28.31 mas/yr
Parallax (π)	10.52±0.52 mas
Distance	310 ± 20 ly (95 ± 5 pc)
Absolute magnitude (M_{V})	−0.08

Orbit
Period (P)	33.04 yr
Semi-major axis (a)	0.219″
Eccentricity (e)	0.898
Inclination (i)	109.7°
Longitude of the node (Ω)	24.3°
Periastron epoch (T)	B1964.62
Argument of periastron (ω) (secondary)	214.5°

Details
Mass	2.15 M_{☉}
Radius	3.0 R_{☉}
Luminosity	104.00 L_{☉}
Surface gravity (log g)	3.85 cgs
Temperature	9,675±329 K
Rotational velocity (v sin i)	40 km/s
Age	210 Myr

Other designations
- Phyllon Kissinou, 23 Com, BD+23°2475, FK5 1323, GC 17142, HD 109485, HIP 61394, HR 4789, SAO 82390, WDS J12349+2238

Database references
SIMBAD	data

23 Comae Berenices, also named Phyllon Kissinou, is a binary star system in the northern constellation of Coma Berenices, situated a few degrees away from the North Galactic Pole. It is visible to the naked eye as a faint, white-hued point of light with an apparent visual magnitude of 4.80. The system is located around 310 light years away from the Sun, based on parallax. It is moving closer to the Earth with a heliocentric radial velocity of −16 km/s.

The components of this system orbit each other with a period of 33 years, a large eccentricity of 0.9, and an angular semimajor axis of 0.219″. The primary, designated component A, is a magnitude 4.96 star with a stellar classification of A0IV, matching an A-type subgiant that has exhausted the supply of hydrogen at its core and is in the process of evolving into a giant. Bychkov et al. (2009) list it as an Am star with an average field strength of 26×10^{−4} T.

The primary is 210 million years old and is spinning with a projected rotational velocity of 40 km/s. It has 2.15 times the mass of the Sun and about three times the Sun's radius. The star is radiating 104 times the luminosity of the Sun from its photosphere at an effective temperature of 9,675 K.

In Ptolemy's Almagest, 23 Comae Berenices is described as "shaped like an ivy leaf" (φύλλοv κισσίνου, phyllon kissinou), presumably referring to the overall shape of the Coma Star Cluster. Based on this, some modern sources have referred to it as Kissin (or Kissīn); this name has also been used for 21 Comae Berenices. The IAU Working Group on Star Names approved the name Phyllon Kissinou for 23 Comae Berenices on 16 May 2024 and it is now so entered in the IAU Catalog of Star Names; since this is a binary system, the IAU has mentioned that the names Phyllon and Kissinou can be applied to the primary and secondary components, respectively.
