= NGC 4475 =

Galaxy in the constellation Coma Berenices

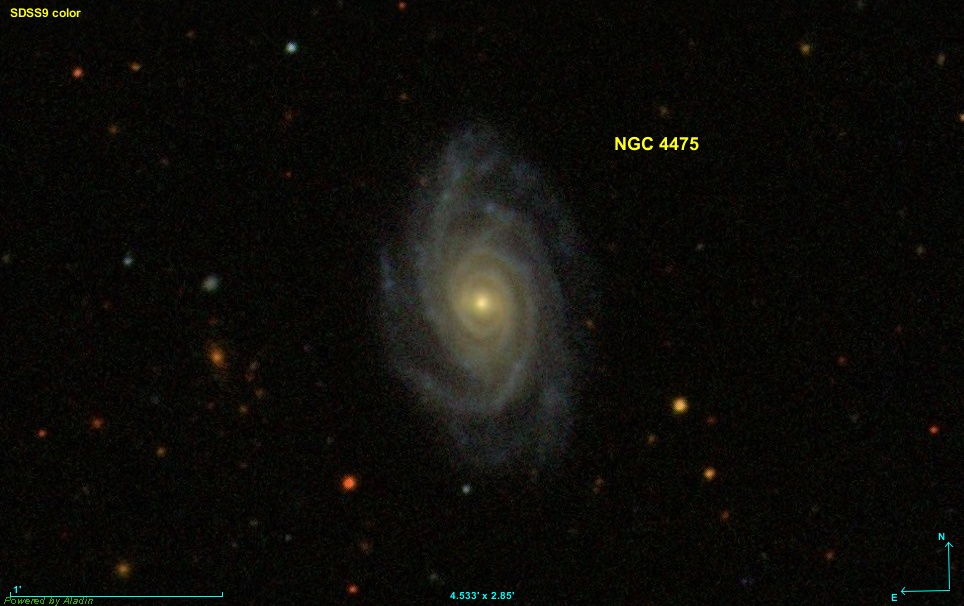
- NGC 4475 imaged by SDSS

Observation data (J2000 epoch)
- Constellation: Coma Berenices
- Right ascension: 12^{h} 29^{m} 47.5825^{s}
- Declination: +27° 14′ 36.039″
- Redshift: 0.024660±0.000005
- Heliocentric radial velocity: 7,393±1 km/s
- Distance: 327.60 ± 10.87 Mly (100.442 ± 3.334 Mpc)
- Apparent magnitude (V): 14.3g

Characteristics
- Type: SAbc
- Size: ~190,600 ly (58.43 kpc) (estimated)
- Apparent size (V): 1.65′ × 0.87′

Other designations
- UGC 7632, MCG +05-30-008, PGC 41225, CGCG 159-008

NGC 4475 is a spiral galaxy in the constellation of Coma Berenices. Its velocity with respect to the cosmic microwave background is 7,681±20 km/s, which corresponds to a Hubble distance of 369.5 ± 25.9 Mly (113.29 ± 7.94 Mpc). However, 12 non-redshift measurements give a closer mean distance of 327.60 ± 10.87 Mly (100.442 ± 3.334 Mpc). It was discovered by German-British astronomer William Herschel on 11 April 1785.

== Supernovae ==
Two supernovae have been observed in NGC 4475:

- SN 2021acnd (Type II, mag. 18.79) was discovered by the Zwicky Transient Facility on 25 October 2021.
- SN 2025nat (Type II, mag. 18.362) was discovered by ATLAS on 7 June 2025.

== See also ==
- List of NGC objects (4001–5000)
