= NGC 4611 =

Galaxy in the constellation Coma Berenices

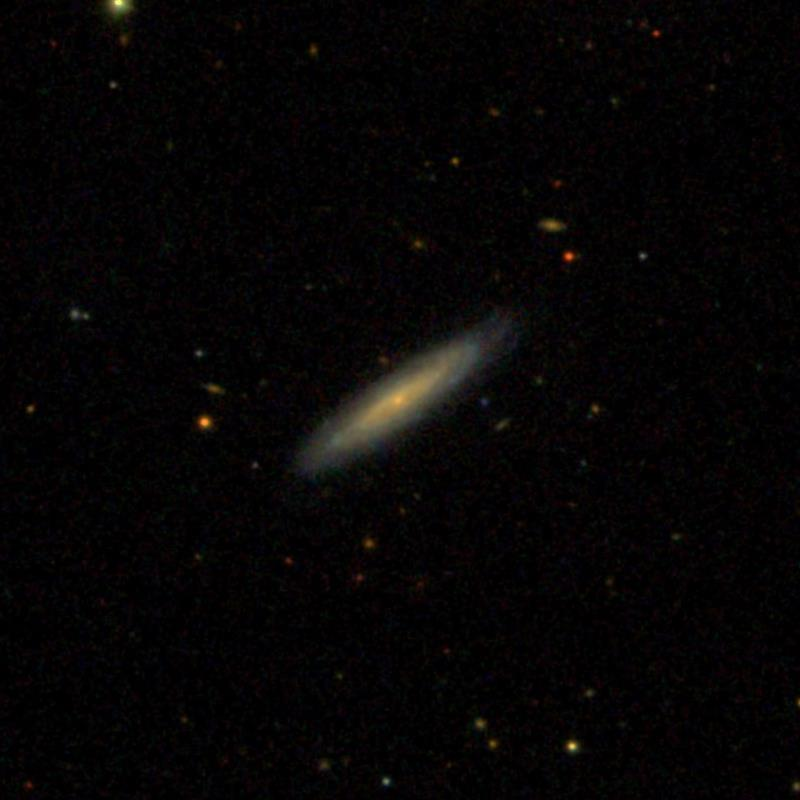
- NGC 4611 imaged by SDSS

Observation data (J2000 epoch)
- Constellation: Coma Berenices
- Right ascension: 12^{h} 41^{m} 25.4331^{s}
- Declination: +13° 43′ 46.198″
- Redshift: 0.020404
- Heliocentric radial velocity: 6117 ± 1 km/s
- Distance: 309.7 ± 21.7 Mly (94.94 ± 6.65 Mpc)
- Apparent magnitude (V): 14.3

Characteristics
- Type: Sbc C
- Size: ~130,100 ly (39.89 kpc) (estimated)
- Apparent size (V): 1.2′ × 0.2′

Other designations
- IRAS F12389+1400, 2MASX J12412541+1343458, IC 805, UGC 7849, MCG +02-32-179, PGC 42564

NGC 4611 is an intermediate spiral galaxy in the constellation of Coma Berenices. Its velocity with respect to the cosmic microwave background is 6,437 ± 22 km/s, which corresponds to a Hubble distance of 94.9 ± 6.7 Mpc (~310 million light-years). It was discovered by French astronomer Édouard Stephan on 17 May 1881. This galaxy was also observed by the American astronomer Lewis Swift on 20 April 1889, and listed in the Index Catalogue as IC 805.

According to the SIMBAD database, NGC 4611 is an Active Galaxy Nucleus Candidate, i.e. it has a compact region at the center of a galaxy that emits a significant amount of energy across the electromagnetic spectrum, with characteristics indicating that this luminosity is not produced by the stars.

== Supernova ==
One supernova has been observed in NGC 4611: SN 2023dtz (Type Ia, mag. 18.1) was discovered by ATLAS on 21 March 2023.

== See also ==
- List of NGC objects (4001–5000)
