= NGC 5000 =

Galaxy in the constellation Coma Berenices

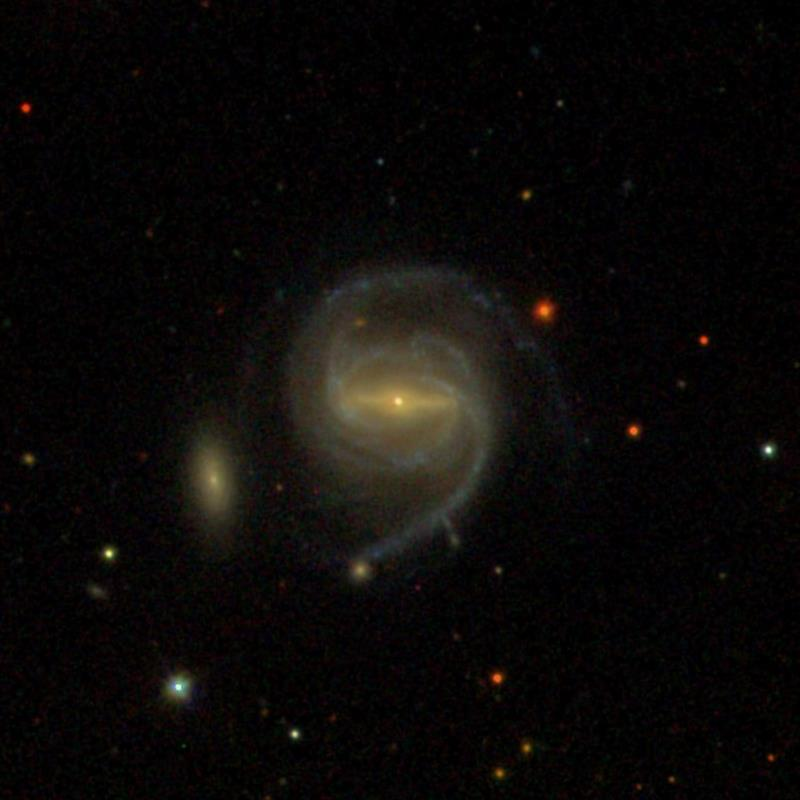

Observation data (J2000 epoch)
- Constellation: Coma Berenices
- Right ascension: 13^{h} 09^{m} 47^{s}
- Declination: 28° 54′ 23″
- Redshift: 0.0187
- Distance: 258 Mly

Characteristics
- Type: SBbc
- Apparent size (V): 1.7′ × 1.4′

Other designations
- CGCG 160-152, IRAS 13073+2910, MCG 5-31-144, PGC 45658, UGC 8241, V V 460.

NGC 5000 is a barred spiral galaxy in the constellation Coma Berenices. It was discovered by German-British astronomer William Herschel on 11 April 1785. It is also known as LEDA 45658, MCG+05-31-144, UGC 8241, VV 460, III 366, h 1544, and GC 3433.

Herschel discovered it with the help of 18.7-inch f/13 speculum telescope. It is very faint, very small and irregularly round with weak concentration.

== Supernova ==
One supernova has been observed in NGC 5000:

- SN 2003el (Type Ic, mag. 18.8) was discovered by LOTOSS (Lick Observatory and Tenagra Observatory Supernova Searches) on 22 May 2003.

== See also ==
- List of NGC objects (4001–5000)
