= Arp 60 =

Galaxy in the constellation Coma Berenices

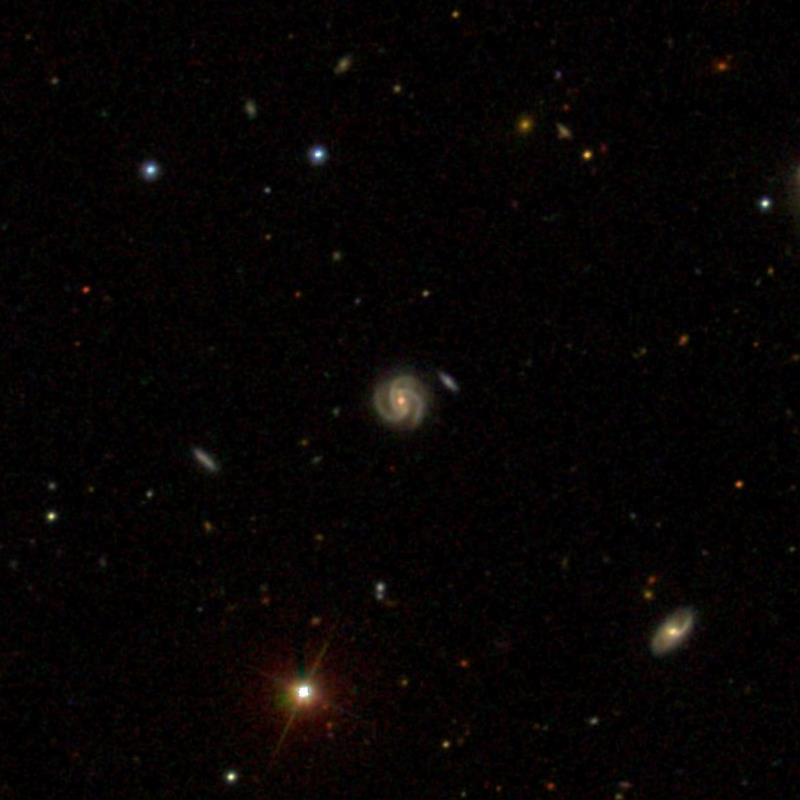
- Sloan Digital Sky Survey image of Arp 60

Observation data (J2000 epoch)
- Constellation: Coma Berenices
- Right ascension: 13^{h} 14^{m} 47.08^{s}
- Declination: +26° 06′ 24.5″
- Redshift: 0.071784
- Heliocentric radial velocity: 21,520 km/s
- Distance: 958 Mly (293.7 Mpc)
- Apparent magnitude (V): 16.2

Characteristics
- Type: SBbc
- Size: 95,000 ly
- Apparent size (V): 0.35 x 0.35

Other designations
- LEDA 1762846, 2MASX J13144704+2606244, 2MASS J13144708+2606239, LQAC 198+026 015, SDSS J131447.07+260624.1, LOFAR J131447.07+260623.8, XMMSL1 J131447.7+260627

Arp 60, also known as LEDA 1762846, is a barred spiral galaxy located in Coma Berenices. It is located 958 million light-years from the Solar System and has an approximate diameter of 95,000 light-years.

== Companion galaxy ==
Arp 60 has one companion galaxy which is located east: SDSS J131446.02+260629.8 known as PGC 4538493. The galaxy is located 979 million light-years away and as such makes a galaxy pair with Arp 60. Together, they are part of the Atlas of Peculiar Galaxies which was created by Halton Arp. In this category, they fall under the classification of Spiral Galaxies with Small, high surface brightness companions.
