= NGC 4015 =

Galaxy in the constellation Coma Berenices

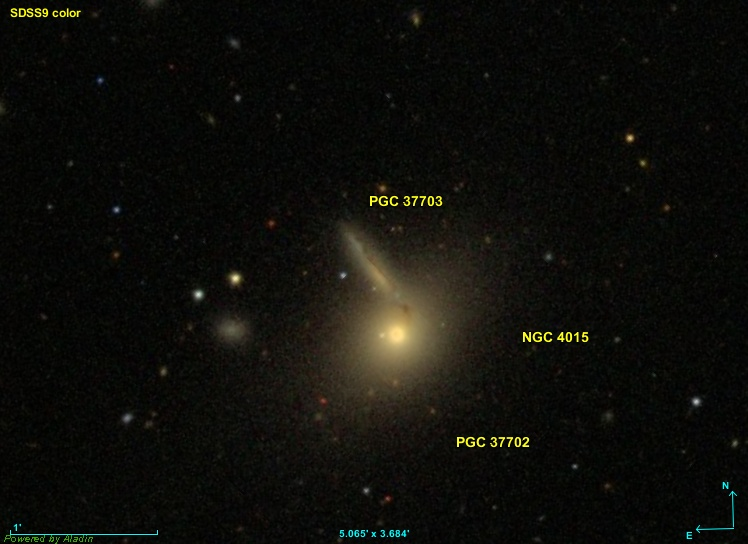

Observation data (J2000.0 epoch)
- Constellation: Coma Berenices
- Right ascension: 11^{h} 58^{m} 42.600^{s}
- Declination: +25° 02′ 11.89″
- Redshift: 0.015172
- Heliocentric radial velocity: 4514 km/s

Characteristics
- Type: SA0
- Apparent size (V): 2.00 × 1.5

Other designations
- UGC 6965, MCG +04-28-109, PGC 37702

NGC 4015 is an unbarred lenticular galaxy in the constellation Coma Berenices. It is located between 215 and 220 million light years away. Its visual magnitude is 13.15.

It was first discovered by the Danish astronomer John Dreyer on 26 April 1878, who described it as a "faint object, very small and with a much brighter middle." He also described it in his notes on the accompanying galaxy, PGC 37703, which he described as "a tail north of the nucleus".

Together, NGC 4015 and PGC 37703 comprise Arp 138 in the Atlas of Peculiar Galaxies.
