= 17 Comae Berenices =

Multiple star system in the constellation Coma Berenices

- Location of 17 Com (circled)

Observation data Epoch J2000.0 Equinox ICRS
- Constellation: Coma Berenices
- 17 Com A
- Right ascension: 12^{h} 28^{m} 54.702^{s}
- Declination: +25° 54′ 46.27″
- Apparent magnitude (V): 5.242±0.004
- 17 Com B
- Right ascension: 12^{h} 28^{m} 44.565^{s}
- Declination: +25° 53′ 57.56″
- Apparent magnitude (V): 6.635
- 17 Com C
- Right ascension: 12^{h} 28^{m} 44.579^{s}
- Declination: +25° 53′ 56.00″
- Apparent magnitude (V): 13.7

Characteristics

17 Com A
- Spectral type: A0p; A0 SrCrEu
- B−V color index: −0.056±0.009
- Variable type: α^{2} CVn + δ Sct(?)

17 Com B
- Evolutionary stage: main sequence
- Spectral type: kA2hA9VmF0
- U−B color index: 0.084
- B−V color index: 0.216

Astrometry

17 Com A
Radial velocity (R_{v})	−1.4±0.5 km/s
Proper motion (μ)	RA: −23.071 mas/yr Dec.: −15.110 mas/yr
Parallax (π)	12.9991±0.3721 mas
Distance	251 ± 7 ly (77 ± 2 pc)
Absolute magnitude (M_{V})	0.98

17 Com B
Radial velocity (R_{v})	−1.8±0.1 km/s
Proper motion (μ)	RA: −22.231 mas/yr Dec.: −17.055 mas/yr
Parallax (π)	13.9752±0.0872 mas
Distance	233 ± 1 ly (71.6 ± 0.4 pc)
Absolute magnitude (M_{V})	2.46

Orbit
Primary	17 Com B
Name	17 Com C
Period (P)	68.290±0.012 d
Eccentricity (e)	0.296±0.008
Periastron epoch (T)	2,448,313.4±0.4 JD
Argument of periastron (ω) (secondary)	260.7±2.2°
Semi-amplitude (K_{1}) (primary)	14.0±0.2 km/s

Details

17 Com A
Mass	2.38 M_{☉} 2.61 M_{☉} 2.75±0.3 M_{☉}
Radius	2.09 R_{☉}
Luminosity	42.7 L_{☉}
Surface gravity (log g)	4.27 cgs 3.70±0.20 cgs
Temperature	10,212 K 9,309±250 K
Rotational velocity (v sin i)	20.4±0.4 km/s
Age	101 Myr

17 Com B
Mass	1.74±0.6 M_{☉}
Radius	1.7 R_{☉}
Luminosity	8.9 L_{☉}
Surface gravity (log g)	4.29±0.20 cgs
Temperature	8,068±200 K
Rotational velocity (v sin i)	22 km/s

17 Com C
Mass	0.61 M_{☉}
Radius	0.62 R_{☉}
Luminosity	0.101 L_{☉}
Temperature	4,107 K

Other designations
- BU 1080, 17 Com, ADS 8568, WDS J12289+2555
- 17 Com A: AI Com, BD+26°2354, GC 17012, HD 108662, HIP 60904, HR 4752, SAO 82330
- 17 Com B: BD+26°2353, GC 17007, HD 108651, HIP 60891, HR 4751, SAO 82328

Database references
SIMBAD	17 Com A
- 17 Com B
- 17 Com C

17 Comae Berenices (17 Com) is a multiple star system in the northern constellation of Coma Berenices. The brighter component, 17 Com A, is a naked eye star with an apparent visual magnitude of 5.2. It has a companion of magnitude 6.6, 17 Com B, positioned at an angular separation of 146.4″ along a position angle of 251°, as of 2018, and a 14th-magnitude companion 1.4″ from 17 Com B. They are located at a distance of approximately 240 light years from the Sun based on parallax measurements.

A
145"
Ba
68.3 days
Bb
1.4"
C

Hierarchy of orbits in the 14 Ceti system

The double nature of this system was documented by F. G. W. Struve in 1836. The pair share a common proper motion through space and thus may be associated. Component B is itself a binary star system, although only the brighter component is visible in the spectrum. The Washington Double Star Catalogue lists the companion as component C, with a magnitude of 13.7 and a separation of 1.4″. The 17 Com stars have been recognized as members of the Coma Star Cluster, but this is disputed.

The star 17 Com A was classified as chemically peculiar by A. J. Cannon prior to 1918. W. W. Morgan in 1932 found the star's spectral lines varied in strength and appearance, and detected lines of the element europium. H. W. Babcock and T. G. Cowling measured the Zeeman effect in this star, demonstrating in 1953 that it has a magnetic field. In 1967, E. P. J. van den Heuvel noted the blue excess of this star, suggesting it is a blue straggler. G. W. Preston and associates in 1969 found that the luminosity and magnetic field of this star varied in strength with a time scale of around five days.

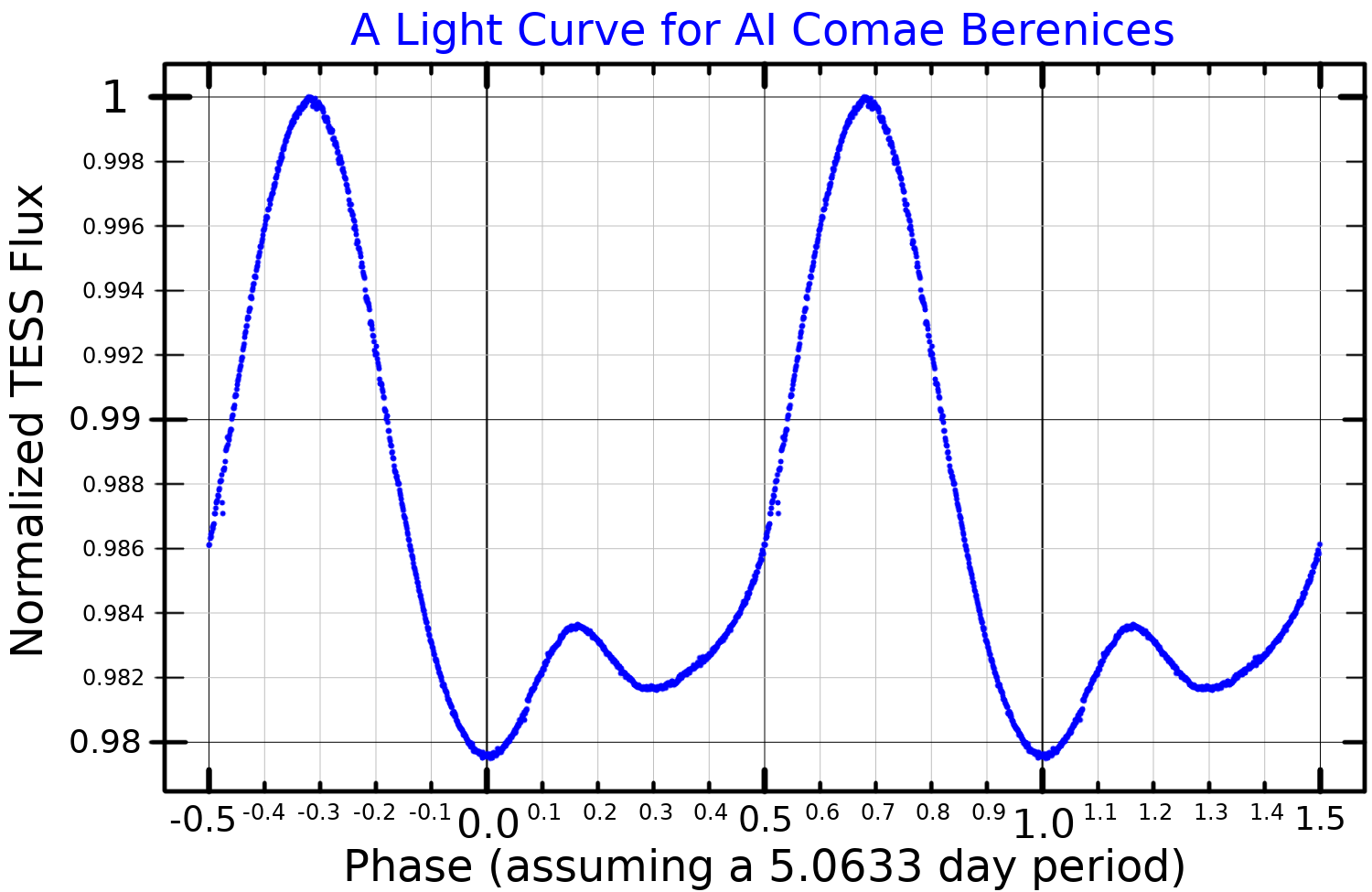
A light curve for AI Comae Berenices, plotted from TESS data

17 Com A is a magnetic chemically peculiar Ap star with a stellar classification of A0p or A0 SrCrEu, with the latter indicating the spectrum shows abundance anomalies of the elements strontium, chromium, and europium. The level of silicon in the atmosphere is also enhanced and it shows a significant helium deficiency. It has the variable star designation of AI Com, and is classified as an Alpha^{2} Canum Venaticorum variable and a suspected Delta Scuti variable. It has been identified as a suspected blue straggler.

The primary has an estimated age of 101 million years and is spinning with a projected rotational velocity of 20 km/s. It has more than double the mass and twice the radius of the Sun. The magnetic field strength is 3,300±150 G. It is radiating 43 times the luminosity of the Sun from its photosphere at an effective temperature of around 10,000 K.

The co-moving companion, component B, is a single-lined spectroscopic binary with an orbital period of 68.3 days and an eccentricity (ovalness) of 0.3. The visible member of this binary pair is a strong Am star with a class of kA2hA9VmF0, indicating it has the Calcium K-lines of an A0 star, the hydrogen lines of an A9 star, and the metallic lines of an F0 star.
