= 7 Comae Berenices =

Star in the constellation Coma Berenices

- 7 Comae Berenices (circled) in the constellation Coma Berenices

Observation data Epoch J2000.0 Equinox ICRS
- Constellation: Coma Berenices
- Right ascension: 12^{h} 16^{m} 20.53831^{s}
- Declination: +23° 56′ 43.4700″
- Apparent magnitude (V): 4.93

Characteristics
- Evolutionary stage: red clump
- Spectral type: G8 III–IIIb
- B−V color index: 0.957

Astrometry
Radial velocity (R_{v})	−27.89±0.13 km/s
Proper motion (μ)	RA: −26.55 mas/yr Dec.: −6.22 mas/yr
Parallax (π)	13.08±0.30 mas
Distance	249 ± 6 ly (76 ± 2 pc)
Absolute magnitude (M_{V})	+0.51

Details
Mass	2.37±0.16 M_{☉}
Radius	10.07±0.66 R_{☉}
Luminosity	63+14 −12 L_{☉}
Surface gravity (log g)	2.95±0.08 cgs
Temperature	5,023±25 K
Metallicity [Fe/H]	−0.09±0.05 dex
Rotational velocity (v sin i)	2.26±0.45 km/s
Age	730±150 Myr

Other designations
- 7 Com, BD+24°2443, FK5 2982, HD 106714, HIP 59847, HR 4667, SAO 82211

Database references
SIMBAD	data

7 Comae Berenices is a single star located 249 light years away in the northern constellation of Coma Berenices. It is a dim star but visible to the naked eye near the Coma Star Cluster with an apparent visual magnitude of 4.93. The star is moving closer to the Earth with a heliocentric radial velocity of −28 km/s, and is predicted to come as close as 83 light-years in 2.4 million years.

This is an evolved giant star with a stellar classification of G8 III–IIIb. At the age of 730 million years it is a red clump giant, which indicates it is on the horizontal branch and is generating energy via helium fusion at its core. The star has 2.4 times the mass of the Sun and has expanded to 10 times the Sun's radius. It is radiating about 63 times the Sun's luminosity from its enlarged photosphere at an effective temperature of 5,023 K.
