= 12 Comae Berenices =

Star in the constellation Coma Berenices

- Location of 12 Comae Berenices (circled in red)

Observation data Epoch J2000.0 Equinox ICRS
- Constellation: Coma Berenices
- Right ascension: 12^{h} 22^{m} 30.31076^{s}
- Declination: +25° 50′ 46.1896″
- Apparent magnitude (V): 4.80

Characteristics
- Spectral type: G7 III + A3 V
- U−B color index: 0.47/0.09
- B−V color index: 0.82/0.11

Astrometry
Radial velocity (R_{v})	+0.5±0.9 km/s
Proper motion (μ)	RA: −10.847 mas/yr Dec.: −9.546 mas/yr
Parallax (π)	11.8280±0.2353 mas
Distance	276 ± 5 ly (85 ± 2 pc)
Absolute magnitude (M_{V})	0.55±0.06 / 1.05±0.06

Orbit
Period (P)	396.4473±0.0002 d
Semi-major axis (a)	20.3358±0.00066
Eccentricity (e)	0.599483±0.000026
Inclination (i)	64.8556±0.0011°
Longitude of the node (Ω)	118.618±0.004°
Periastron epoch (T)	46877.148±0.054 MJD
Argument of periastron (ω) (primary)	100.162±0.001°
Semi-amplitude (K_{1}) (primary)	22.42±2.22 km/s

Details

12 Com A
Mass	2.64±0.07 M_{☉}
Radius	8.36±0.15 R_{☉}
Luminosity	56.2+2.7 −2.5 L_{☉}
Temperature	5,300±200 K
Age	533 ± 41 ± 42 Myr

12 Com B
Mass	2.10±0.03 M_{☉}
Radius	2.5±0.3 R_{☉}
Luminosity	30.2+2.2 −2.2 L_{☉}
Temperature	8,500±500 K

Other designations
- 12 Com, NSV 5581, BD+26°2337, FK5 1318, HD 107700, HIP 60351, HR 4707, SAO 82273, WDS J12225+2551A

Database references
SIMBAD	data

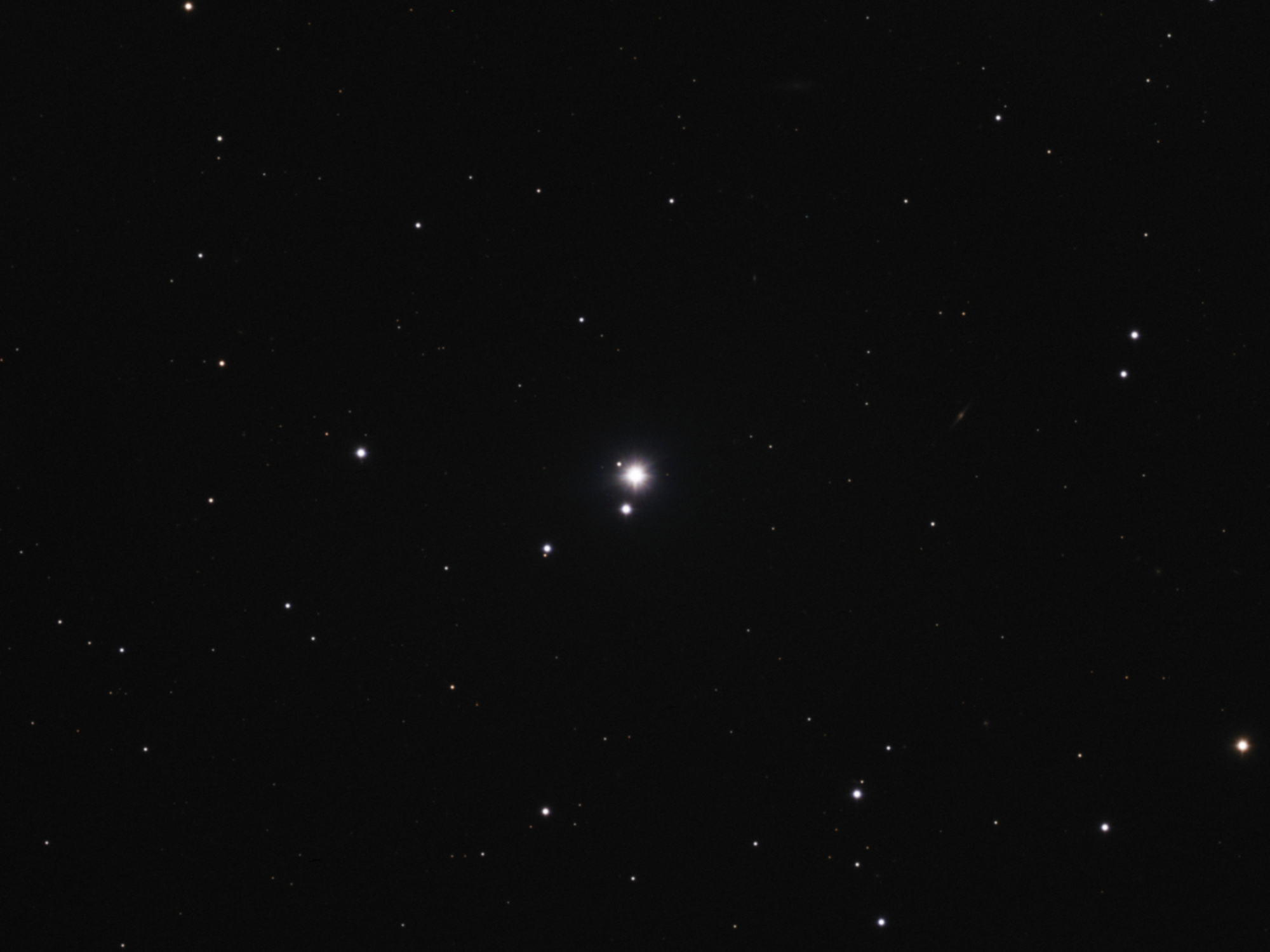
12 Comae Berenices in optical light

12 Comae Berenices is a binary star system in the northern constellation of Coma Berenices. It is the brightest member of the Coma Star Cluster and is visible to the naked eye with an apparent visual magnitude of 4.80. Although listed as a suspected variable star, there is no photometric evidence of it being variable in luminosity. However, the radial velocity was found to be variable, as announced by W. W. Campbell in 1910. The first orbital solution was published by Vinter Hansen in the 1940s. It is a double-lined spectroscopic binary with an orbital period of 396.5 days and an eccentricity of 0.566.

This system consists of two stars, an evolved G-type giant star and a smaller but higher temperature A-type main-sequence star. Griffin and Griffin (2011) suggested that the secondary component may have begun its evolution away from the main sequence, and instead assigned it a luminosity class of IV. The primary, designated component A, has about 2.6 times the mass of the Sun and has expanded to 8.4 times the Sun's radius. It is radiating 56 times the Sun's luminosity from its enlarged photosphere at an effective temperature of 5,300 K. Its companion, component B, has double the Sun's mass and 2.5 times the radius. It shines with 30 times the luminosity of the Sun at 8,500 K.
