= Gamma Comae Berenices =

Star in the constellation Coma Berenices

γ Comae Berenices
- γ Comae Berenices (circled) in the constellation Coma Berenices

Observation data Epoch J2000.0 Equinox J2000.0 (ICRS)
- Constellation: Coma Berenices
- Right ascension: 12^{h} 26^{m} 56.273^{s}
- Declination: +28° 16′ 06.318″
- Apparent magnitude (V): 4.36

Characteristics
- Spectral type: K1 III Fe0.5
- U−B color index: +1.16
- B−V color index: +1.13
- R−I color index: +0.51

Astrometry
Radial velocity (R_{v})	+3.38±0.11 km/s
Proper motion (μ)	RA: −83.006 mas/yr Dec.: −80.917 mas/yr
Parallax (π)	19.8641±0.1147 mas
Distance	164.2 ± 0.9 ly (50.3 ± 0.3 pc)
Absolute magnitude (M_{V})	0.76

Details
Mass	1.65±0.18 M_{☉}
Radius	12.01+0.36 −0.34 R_{☉}
Luminosity	61.4±3.3 L_{☉}
Surface gravity (log g)	2.53±0.05 cgs
Temperature	4,660±84 K
Metallicity [Fe/H]	0.16±0.10 dex
Rotational velocity (v sin i)	≤ 17 km/s
Age	2.72±0.78 Gyr

Other designations
- γ Com, 15 Comae Berenices, BD+29°2288, FK5 2999, GC 16964, HD 108381, HIP 60742, HR 4737, SAO 82313, PPM 101903

Database references
SIMBAD	data

Gamma Comae Berenices is a single, orange-hued star in the northern constellation of Coma Berenices. Its name is a Bayer designation that is Latinized from γ Comae Berenices, and abbreviated Gamma Com or γ Com. This star is faintly visible to the naked eye, having an apparent visual magnitude of 4.36. Based upon an annual parallax shift of 19.86 mas as seen from Earth, its distance can be estimated as around 167 light years from the Sun. The star is moving away from the Sun with a radial velocity of +3 km/s.

This is an evolved K-type giant star with a stellar classification of K1 III Fe0.5. The suffix notation indicates the star displays an overabundance of iron in its spectrum. It is most likely (91% chance) on the horizontal branch with an age of 2.7 billion years. If this is true, then it has an estimated 1.65 times the mass of the Sun and has expanded to nearly 12 times the Sun's radius. The star is radiating 58 times the Sun's luminosity from its enlarged photosphere at an effective temperature of around 4,652 K. Gamma Comae Berenices appears as part of the Coma Star Cluster, although it is probably not actually a member of this cluster.

R. H. Allen's Star Names attributes the name Al Ḍafīrah to this star, from an Arabic name for the Coma Star Cluster. In Chinese astronomy, it is identified as Lángwèiyī (郎位一), meaning it is the first star of the asterism Lángwèi (郎位, Officers of the Imperial Guard).
