= NGC 4495 =

Galaxy in the constellation Coma Berenices

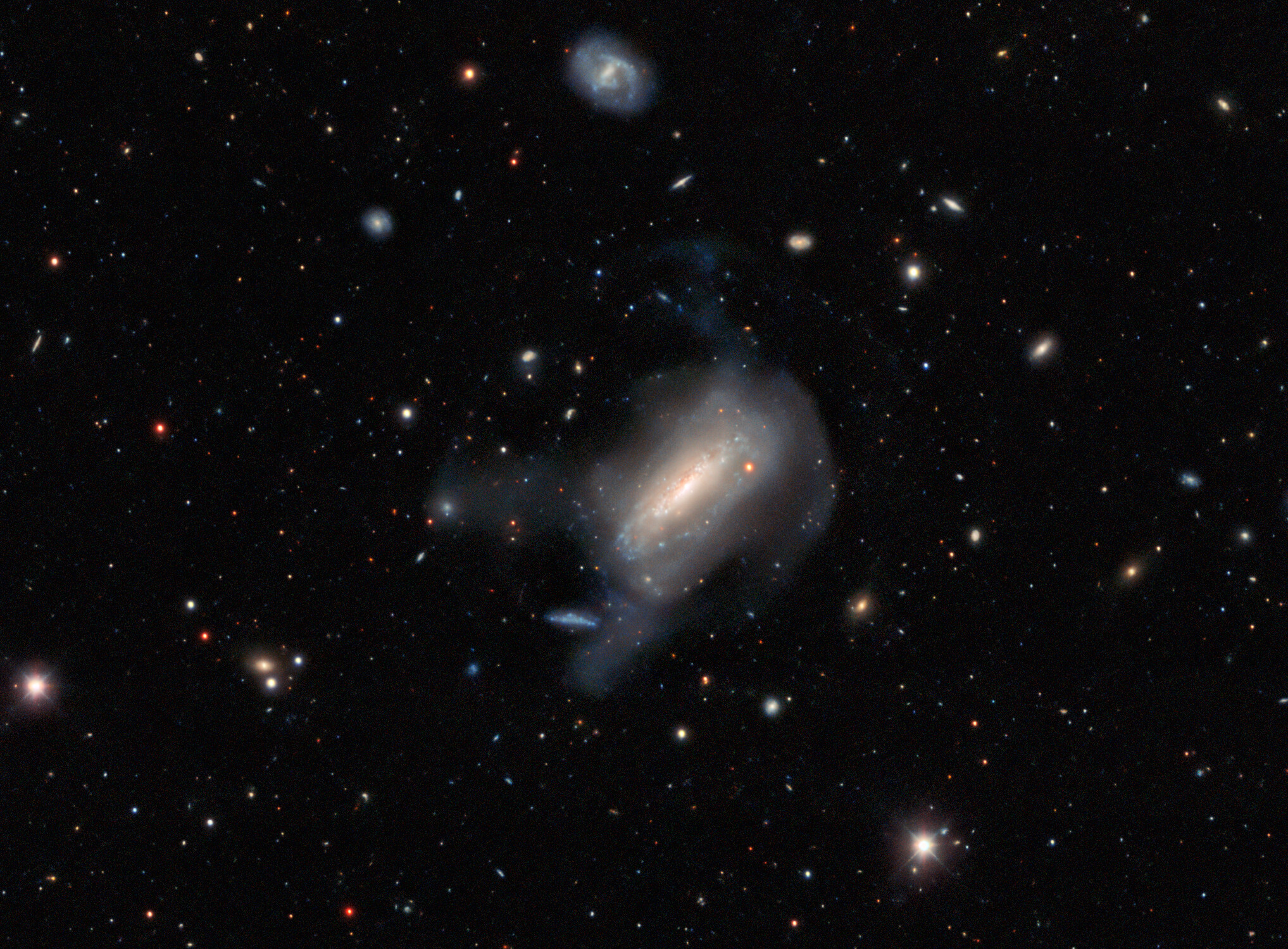
- NGC 4495 imaged by the Cerro Tololo Inter-American Observatory

Observation data (J2000 epoch)
- Constellation: Coma Berenices
- Right ascension: 12^{h} 31^{m} 22.9217^{s}
- Declination: +29° 08′ 11.472″
- Redshift: 0.015243
- Heliocentric radial velocity: 4570 ± 3 km/s
- Distance: 233.3 ± 16.4 Mly (71.54 ± 5.02 Mpc)
- Apparent magnitude (V): 13.3

Characteristics
- Type: Sab
- Size: ~104,000 ly (31.89 kpc) (estimated)
- Apparent size (V): 1.4′ × 0.8′

Other designations
- IRAS 12289+2924, 2MASX J12312290+2908109, UGC 7663, MCG +05-30-012, PGC 41438, CGCG 159-009

NGC 4495 is a spiral galaxy in the constellation of Coma Berenices. Its velocity with respect to the cosmic microwave background is 4850 ± 20 km/s, which corresponds to a Hubble distance of 233.3 ± 16.4 Mly (71.54 ± 5.02 Mpc). Additionally, 31 non-redshift measurements give a distance of 223.50 ± 3.58 Mly (68.526 ± 1.099 Mpc). It was discovered by German-British astronomer William Herschel on 13 March 1785.

According to the SIMBAD database, NGC 4495 is a LINER galaxy, i.e. a galaxy whose nucleus has an emission spectrum characterized by broad lines of weakly ionized atoms.

== Supernovae ==
Three supernovae have been observed in NGC 4495:

- SN 1994S (Type Ia, mag. 14.5) was discovered by Larry Mitchell on 4 June 1994.
- SN 2010lo (type unknown, mag. 17.3) was discovered by the La Sagra Sky Survey on 15 December 2010.
- SN 2011ca (Type Ic, mag. 17.2) was discovered by Fabrizio Ciabattari and E. Mazzoni on 26 April 2011.

== See also ==
- List of NGC objects (4001–5000)
