= NGC 4147 =

Globular cluster in the constellation Coma Berenices

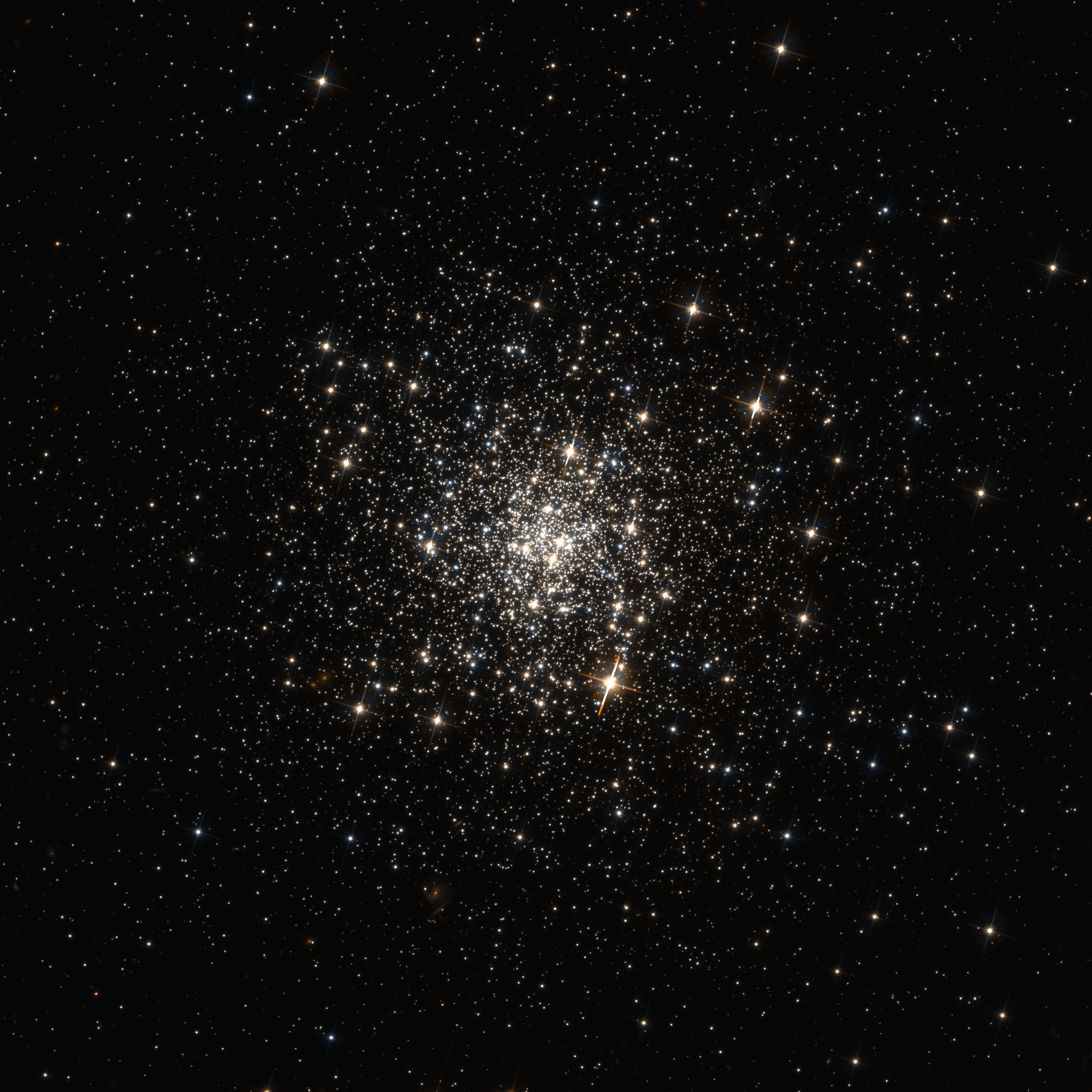
- NGC 4147 by the Hubble Space Telescope

Observation data (J2000 epoch)
- Class: IX
- Constellation: Coma Berenices
- Right ascension: 12^{h} 10^{m} 06.149^{s}
- Declination: +18° 32′ 31.78″
- Distance: 60 kly (18.5 kpc)
- Apparent magnitude (V): 10.74
- Apparent dimensions (V): 1.730′ × 1.592′

Physical characteristics
- Mass: 37,200 M_{☉}
- Tidal radius: 6.6′
- Metallicity: [Fe/H] = −1.78 dex
- Estimated age: 11.0 Gyr
- Other designations: GCl 18, C 1207+188

NGC 4147, also known as the Kick the Can Cluster, is the New General Catalogue identifier for a globular cluster of stars in the northern constellation of Coma Berenices. It was discovered by English astronomer William Herschel on March 14, 1784, who described it as "very bright, pretty large, gradually brighter in the middle". With an apparent visual magnitude of 10.7, it is located around 60,000 light years away from the Sun at a relatively high galactic latitude of 77.2°.

This is a relatively small globular cluster, ranking 112th in luminosity among the Milky Way globular cluster population. It is considered an Oosterhoff type I cluster (OoI), despite having a relatively low metallicity. Indeed, it has the lowest metallicity of any OoI cluster known. There are 19 RR Lyrae variable star candidates and as many as 23 blue stragglers. A high proportion of the latter are concentrated near the dense core of the cluster, which is consistent with the idea that blue stragglers form through stellar mergers.

The cluster lies some 70.4 ± 7.5 kly (21.6 ± 2.3 kpc) from the Galactic Center, and is relatively isolated from other globular clusters in the galaxy. The position of this cluster makes it a candidate for association with the Sagittarius tidal stream, and thus it may have been captured by the Milky Way after separation from the Sagittarius Dwarf Spheroidal Galaxy. A contour map of the cluster appears to show S-shaped tidal arms stretching to the north and south for several tidal radii. Such features are predicted for globular clusters that follow elliptical orbits and are near their apogalacticon.
