= SN 1940B =

Supernova of 1940 in constellation Coma Berenices

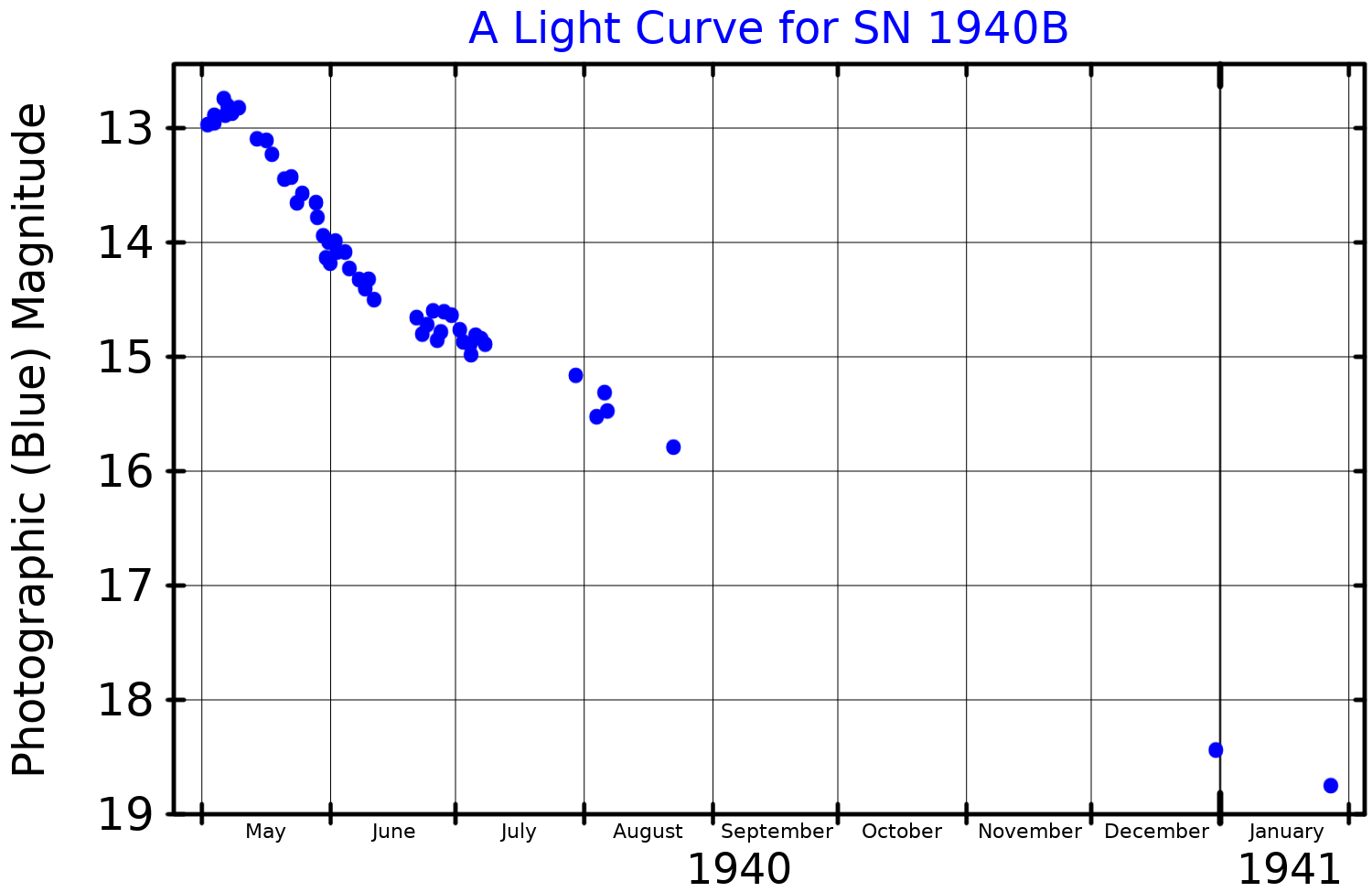
- A light curve for SN 1940B, plotted from data available in the Open Supernova Catalog
- Event type: Supernova
- SN.IIP
- Date: 5 May 1940
- Constellation: Coma Berenices
- Right ascension: 12^{h} 50^{m} 33.0^{s}
- Declination: +25° 32′ 12″
- Peak apparent magnitude: 12.8

SN 1940B was a supernova discovered on 5 May 1940 in the galaxy NGC 4725 in Coma Berenices. It had a magnitude of 12.8 and became the first observed type II supernova.

SN 1940B is one of the five supernovae discovered in 1940, the other being SN 1940A, SN 1940C, SN 1940D and SN 1940E.
