= 13 Comae Berenices =

Star system in the constellation Coma Berenices

Observation data Epoch J2000.0 Equinox ICRS
- Constellation: Coma Berenices
- Right ascension: 12^{h} 24^{m} 18.54890^{s}
- Declination: +26° 05′ 54.9214″
- Apparent magnitude (V): 5.15 – 5.18

Characteristics
- Evolutionary stage: main sequence
- Spectral type: A3 V
- B−V color index: 0.082±0.003
- Variable type: α^{2} CVn

Astrometry
Radial velocity (R_{v})	+0.1±0.1 km/s
Proper motion (μ)	RA: −26.158 mas/yr Dec.: −9.385 mas/yr
Parallax (π)	11.1318±0.1589 mas
Distance	293 ± 4 ly (90 ± 1 pc)
Absolute magnitude (M_{V})	0.38

Orbit
Period (P)	27.25±1.76 yr
Semi-major axis (a)	0.170±0.012″
Eccentricity (e)	0.868±0.021
Inclination (i)	32.3±7.3°
Longitude of the node (Ω)	164.0±8.2°
Periastron epoch (T)	2017.80±0.11
Argument of periastron (ω) (secondary)	275.1±7.1°

Details
Mass	2.83 M_{☉}
Radius	3.37 R_{☉}
Luminosity	55 L_{☉}
Surface gravity (log g)	3.84±0.14 cgs
Temperature	8,846±301 K
Metallicity [Fe/H]	0.24 dex
Rotation	29.5 days
Rotational velocity (v sin i)	48 km/s
Age	429 Myr

Other designations
- 13 Com, GN Com, BD+26° 2344, HD 107966, HIP 60514, HR 4717, SAO 82291

Database references
SIMBAD	data

13 Comae Berenices is a binary star system in the northern constellation of Coma Berenices. It has an apparent visual magnitude of 5.2, which is bright enough to be faintly visible to the naked eye. With an annual parallax shift of 11.1 mas, it is located around 293 light years from the Sun. It is member of the nearby Coma Star Cluster (Melotte 111).

The two stars of this system orbit with a period of 27.25 years and a large eccentricity of 0.868. The primary is an A-type main-sequence star with a stellar classification of A3 V. In 1965, Gerhard Jackisch discovered the star is a variable star. It was given its variable star designation, GN Comae Berenices, in 1975. It is catalogued as an Alpha^{2} Canum Venaticorum variable. Rensom (1990) listed it as a suspected Am star. The system is a source of X-ray emission, which may be coming from the companion.
