= NGC 4651 =

Spiral galaxy in the constellation Coma Berenices

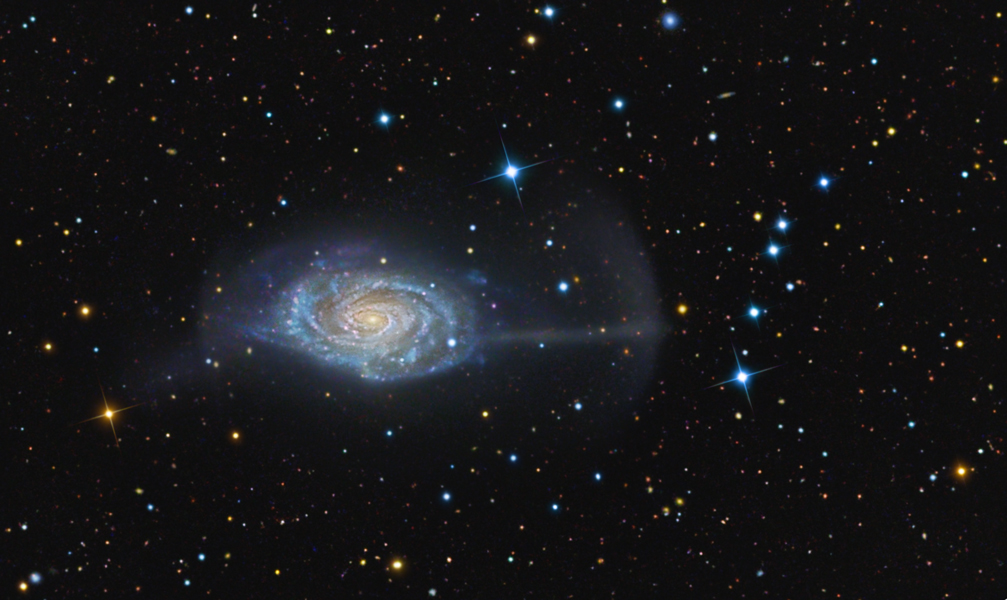
- NGC 4651. Note the umbrella-shaped stream.

Observation data (J2000 epoch)
- Constellation: Coma Berenices
- Right ascension: 12^{h} 43^{m} 42.6766^{s}
- Declination: +16° 23′ 36.222″
- Redshift: 0.002669
- Heliocentric radial velocity: 800 ± 1 km/s
- Distance: 74.20 ± 3.50 Mly (22.749 ± 1.074 Mpc)
- Apparent magnitude (V): 11.39

Characteristics
- Type: SA(rs)c
- Size: ~87,900 ly (26.95 kpc) (estimated)
- Apparent size (V): 4.0′ × 2.6′

Other designations
- Umbrella Galaxy, IRAS 12412+1639, Arp 189, UGC 7901, MCG +03-33-001, PGC 42833, CGCG 100-004, VV 56

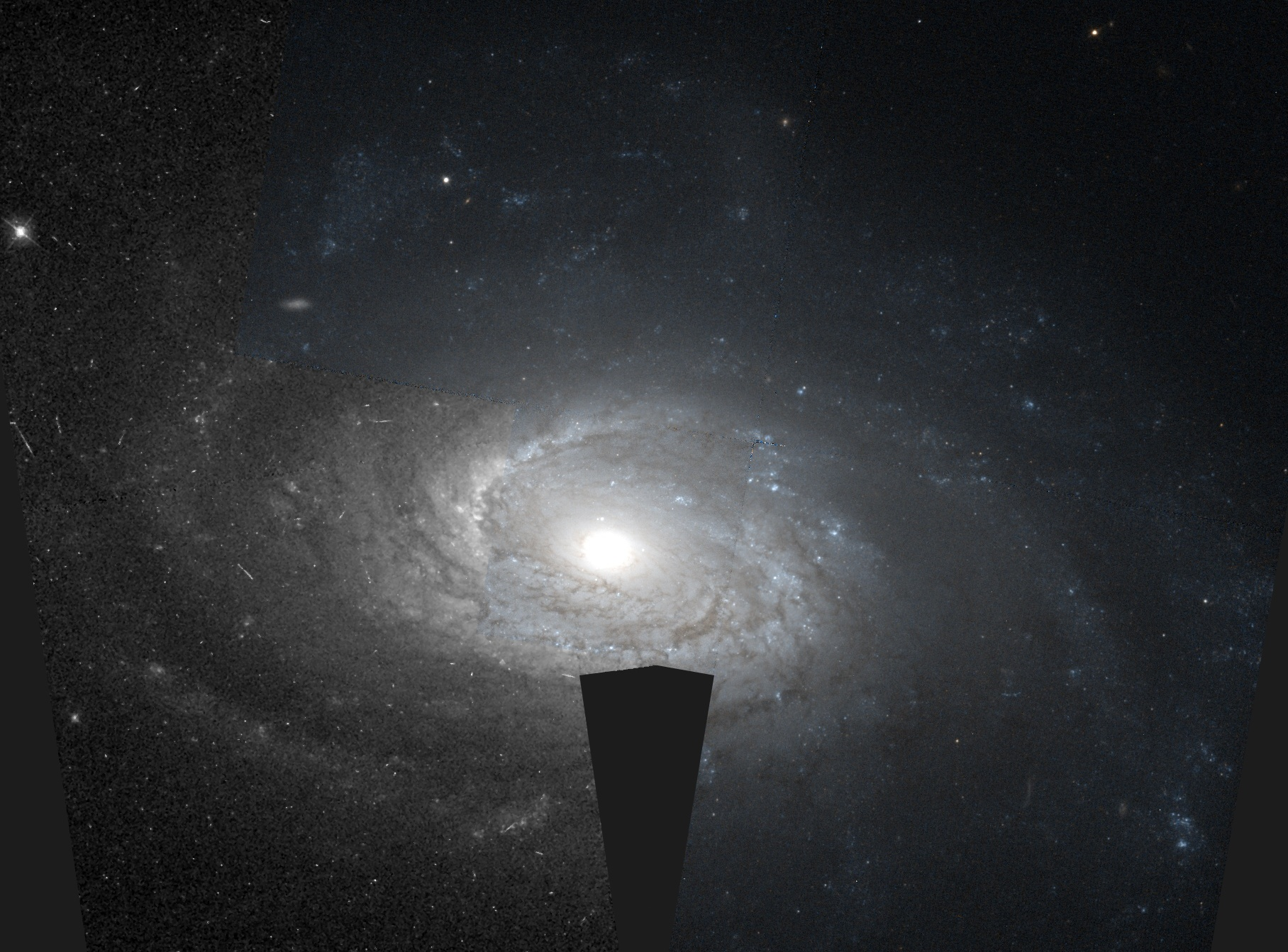
NGC 4651 imaged by the Hubble Space Telescope

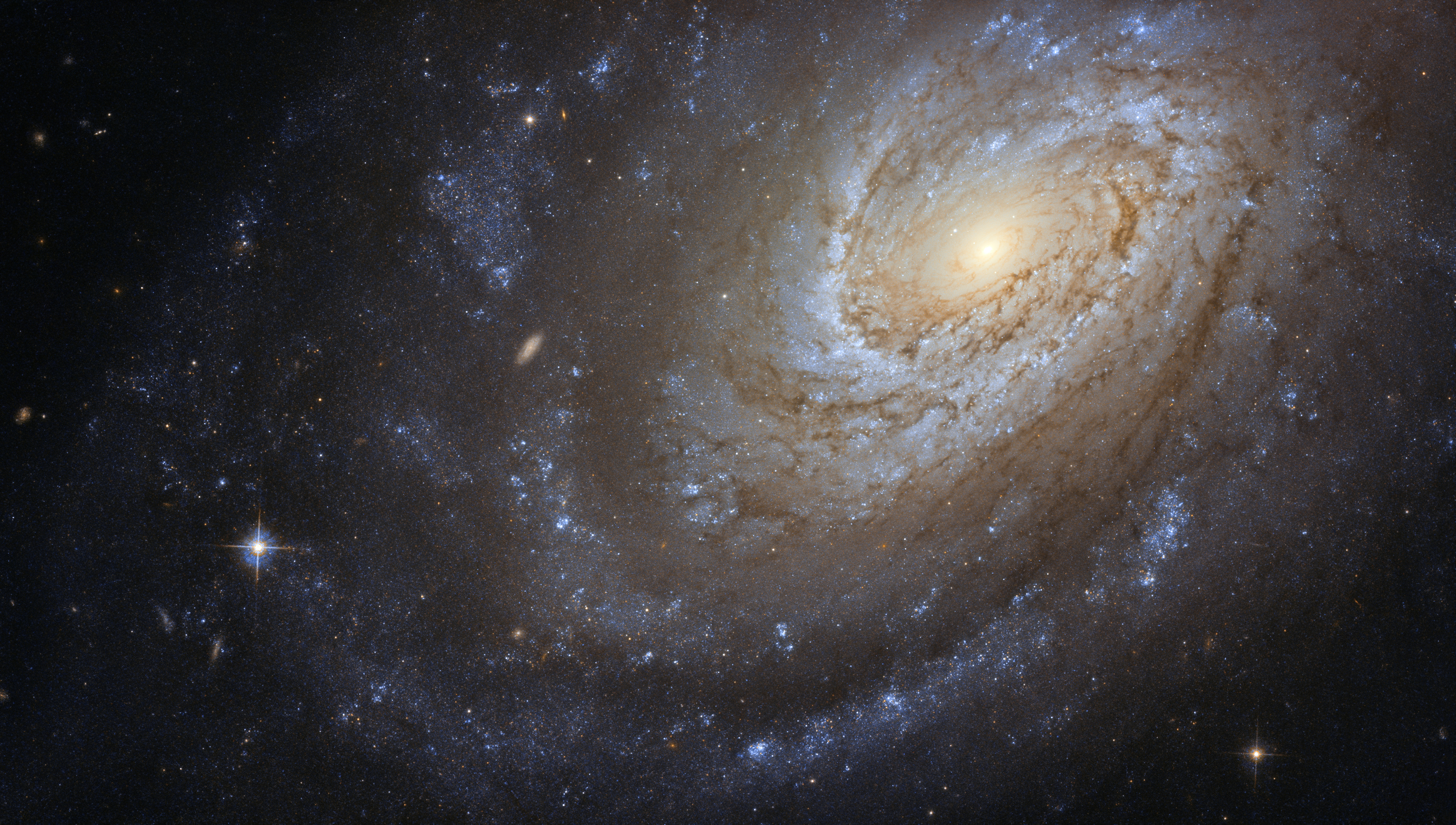
Spiral galaxy NGC 4651. Credit: ESA / Hubble Space Telescope & NASA, D. Leonard

NGC 4651 is a spiral galaxy located in the constellation of Coma Berenices that can be seen with amateur telescopes, at a distance not well determined that ranges from 35 million light years to 72 million light years. It was discovered by German-British astronomer William Herschel on 30 December 1783.

== Features ==
This member of the Virgo Cluster, located on its outskirts, is known as the Umbrella Galaxy due to the umbrella-shaped structure that extends from its disk to the east and that is composed of stellar streams, being the remnants of a much smaller galaxy that has been torn apart by NGC 4651's tidal forces, something that explains why NGC 4651 has been included on Halton Arp's Atlas of Peculiar Galaxies as Arp 189 -galaxy with filaments-.

Studies using radiotelescopes of the distribution of its neutral hydrogen show distortions on NGC 4651's outer regions and a gas clump associated with a dwarf galaxy that may have been born in the event that produced the mentioned stellar streams.

Unlike most spiral galaxies of the Virgo Cluster, NGC 4651 is rich in neutral hydrogen, also extending beyond the optical disk, and its star formation is typical for a galaxy of its type.

== Supernovae ==
Two supernovae have been observed in NGC 4651:

- SN 1987K (Type II, mag. 15) was discovered by Carlton Pennypacker on 28 July 1987.
- SN 2006my (Type II, mag. 15.3) was discovered by Kōichi Itagaki on 8 November 2006.
