= Ramesside star clocks =

The Ramesside star clocks are ancient Egyptian star clocks appearing on the ceilings of several royal tombs of the Ramesside period. Two sets of star clocks appear on the tomb Ramesses VII and Ramesses IX. Although all of the sets are corrupt to some degree, a prototype clock can be reconstructed from them.
