= 21 Comae Berenices =

Star in the constellation Coma Berenices

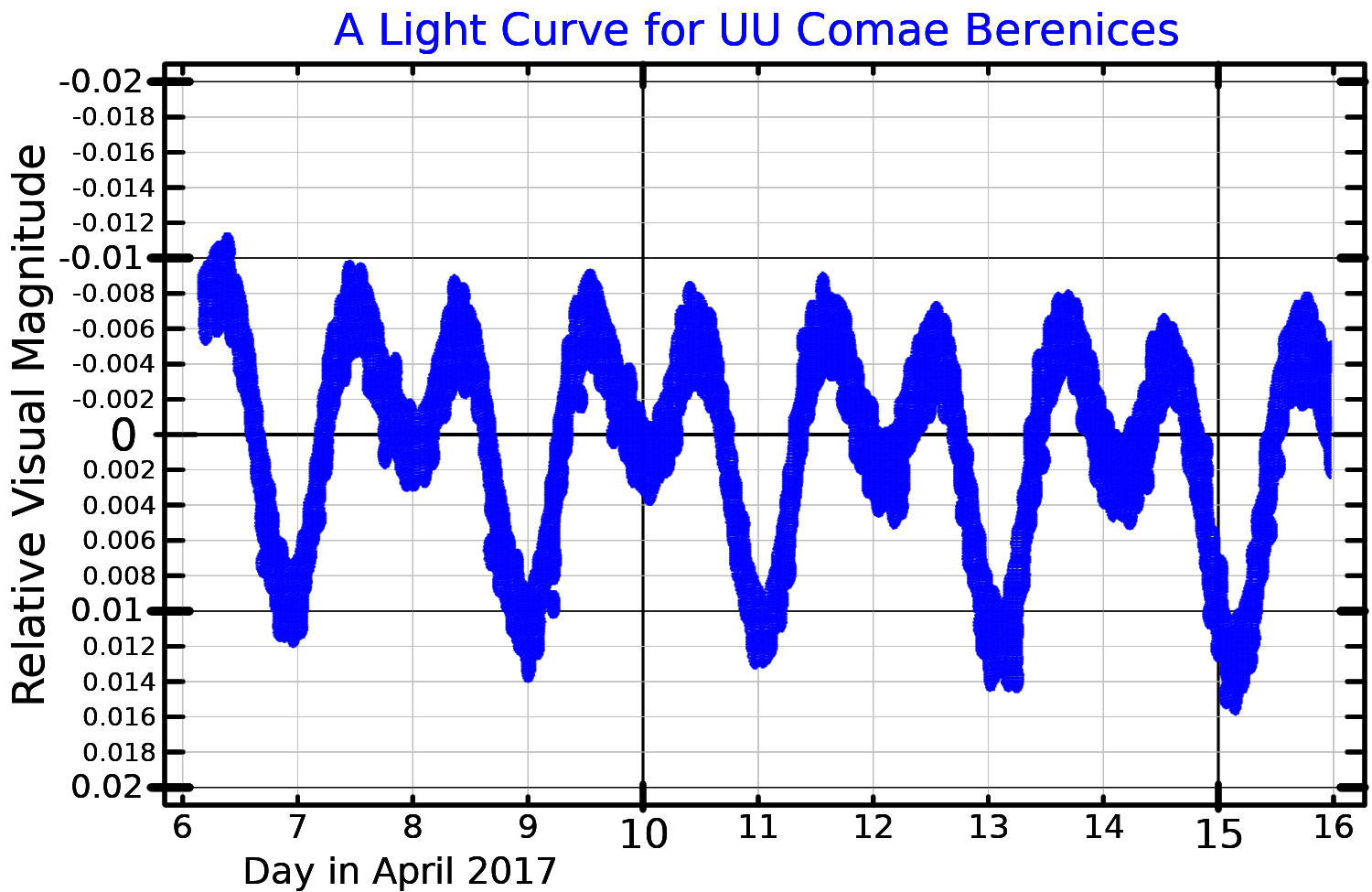
- A visual band light curve for UU Comae Berenices from MOST data. Adapted from Paunzen et al. (2019)

Observation data Epoch J2000.0 Equinox J2000.0 (ICRS)
- Constellation: Coma Berenices
- Right ascension: 12^{h} 31^{m} 00.561^{s}
- Declination: +24° 34′ 01.80″
- Apparent magnitude (V): 5.41 – 5.46

Characteristics
- Evolutionary stage: main sequence
- Spectral type: A3p SrCr
- B−V color index: 0.056±0.008
- Variable type: α^{2} CVn + δ Sct

Astrometry
Radial velocity (R_{v})	+1.0±1.8 km/s
Proper motion (μ)	RA: −12.474 mas/yr Dec.: −9.085 mas/yr
Parallax (π)	12.0785±0.1214 mas
Distance	270 ± 3 ly (82.8 ± 0.8 pc)
Absolute magnitude (M_{V})	0.66

Details
Mass	2.29±0.10 M_{☉}
Radius	2.6±0.2 R_{☉}
Luminosity	38.2±1.3 L_{☉}
Surface gravity (log g)	3.9±0.2 cgs
Temperature	8,900±200 K
Rotation	2.05219 d
Rotational velocity (v sin i)	63±2 km/s
Age	400–800 Myr

Other designations
- Kissīn, 21 Com, UU Com, BD+25°2517, HD 108945, HIP 61071, HR 4766, SAO 82346

Database references
SIMBAD	data

21 Comae Berenices is a variable star in the northern constellation of Coma Berenices. It has the variable star designation UU Comae Berenices, while 21 Comae Berenices is the Flamsteed designation.

== About ==
According to R. H. Allen, English orientalist Thomas Hyde attributed the ancient title Kissīn to this star, a name that comes from a climbing plant – either bindweed or dog rose. This star has a white hue and is just visible to the naked eye with an apparent visual magnitude that fluctuates at about 5.4. Based upon parallax measurements, it is located at a distance of approximately 270 light years away from the Sun. It is a single star but is a confirmed physical member of the Melotte 111 open cluster.

== History ==
This object has been studied extensively since 1953, producing some occasionally contradictory results such as hints of pulsational behavior or a binary companion. It is a weakly magnetic chemically peculiar star of type CP2, or Ap star, that is most likely on the main sequence. The stellar classification is A3p SrCr, where the suffix notation indicates abundance anomalies of the iron-peak element chromium, as well as strontium.

In 1950, Olin Jeuck Eggen reported that the brightness of 21 Comae Berenices is variable. This is an Alpha^{2} Canum Venaticorum (ACV) variable, which indicates it varies in luminosity as it rotates due to spots on its surface created by a magnetic field. The range of variation has an amplitude of 0.02 magnitude and a period of just over two days. Samus et al. (2017) have it classified as a low-amplitude Delta Scuti variable, although this is disputed.

The age of the Melotte 111 cluster, and therefore this star, lies in the range of 400–800 million years. The star has a projected rotational velocity of 63 km/s, with a polar inclination of 64° or greater, resulting in a rotation period of 2.05 days. Stellar evolutionary models yield a mass of around 2.3 times that of the Sun and 2.6 times the Sun's radius for this object. It is radiating 38 times the luminosity of the Sun from its photosphere at an effective temperature of 8,900 K.
