= Coma Berenices =

Constellation in the northern hemisphere

- Constellation
- List of stars in Coma Berenices
- Abbreviation: Com
- Genitive: Comae Berenices
- Pronunciation: /ˈkoʊmə ˌbɛrəˈnaɪsiːz/, genitive /ˈkoʊmiː/
- Symbolism: Berenice's hair
- Right ascension: 11^{h} 58^{m} 25.0885^{s}–13^{h} 36^{m} 06.9433^{s}
- Declination: 33.3074303°–13.3040485°
- Area: 386 sq. deg. (42nd)
- Main stars: 3
- Bayer/Flamsteed stars: 44
- Stars brighter than 3.00^{m}: 0
- Stars within 10.00 pc (32.62 ly): 1
- Brightest star: β Com (4.26^{m})
- Nearest star: β Com
- Messier objects: 8
- Meteor showers: Coma Berenicids
- Bordering constellations: Canes Venatici; Ursa Major; Leo; Virgo; Boötes
- Visible at latitudes between +90° and −70°. Best visible at 21:00 (9 p.m.) during the month of May.

Coma Berenices is an ancient asterism in the northern sky, which has been defined as one of the 88 modern constellations. It is in the direction of the fourth galactic quadrant, between Leo and Boötes, and it is visible in both hemispheres. Its name means "Berenice's Hair" in Latin and refers to Queen Berenice II of Egypt, who sacrificed her long hair as a votive offering. It was introduced to Western astronomy during the third century BC by Conon of Samos and was further corroborated as a constellation by Gerardus Mercator and Tycho Brahe. It is the only modern constellation named after an historic person. (Note: One other constellation's name is derived from a reference to a historical person: the constellation Scutum is a shortening of the former name Scutum Sobiescianum ("shield of Sobieski"), named after King John III Sobieski of Poland. It is called the equivalent of "Shield of Sobieski" in some other languages, such as French.)

The constellation's major stars are Alpha, Beta, and Gamma Comae Berenices. They form a half square, along the diagonal of which run Berenice's imaginary tresses, formed by the Coma Star Cluster. The constellation's brightest star is Beta Comae Berenices, a 4.2-magnitude main sequence star similar to the Sun. Coma Berenices contains the North Galactic Pole and one of the richest-known galaxy clusters, the Coma Cluster, part of the Coma Supercluster. Galaxy Malin 1, in the constellation, is the first-known giant low-surface-brightness galaxy. Supernova SN 1940B was the first scientifically observed (underway) type II supernova. FK Comae Berenices is the prototype of an eponymous class of variable stars. The constellation is the radiant of one meteor shower, Coma Berenicids, which has one of the fastest meteor speeds, up to 65 kilometres per second (40 mi/s).

== History ==
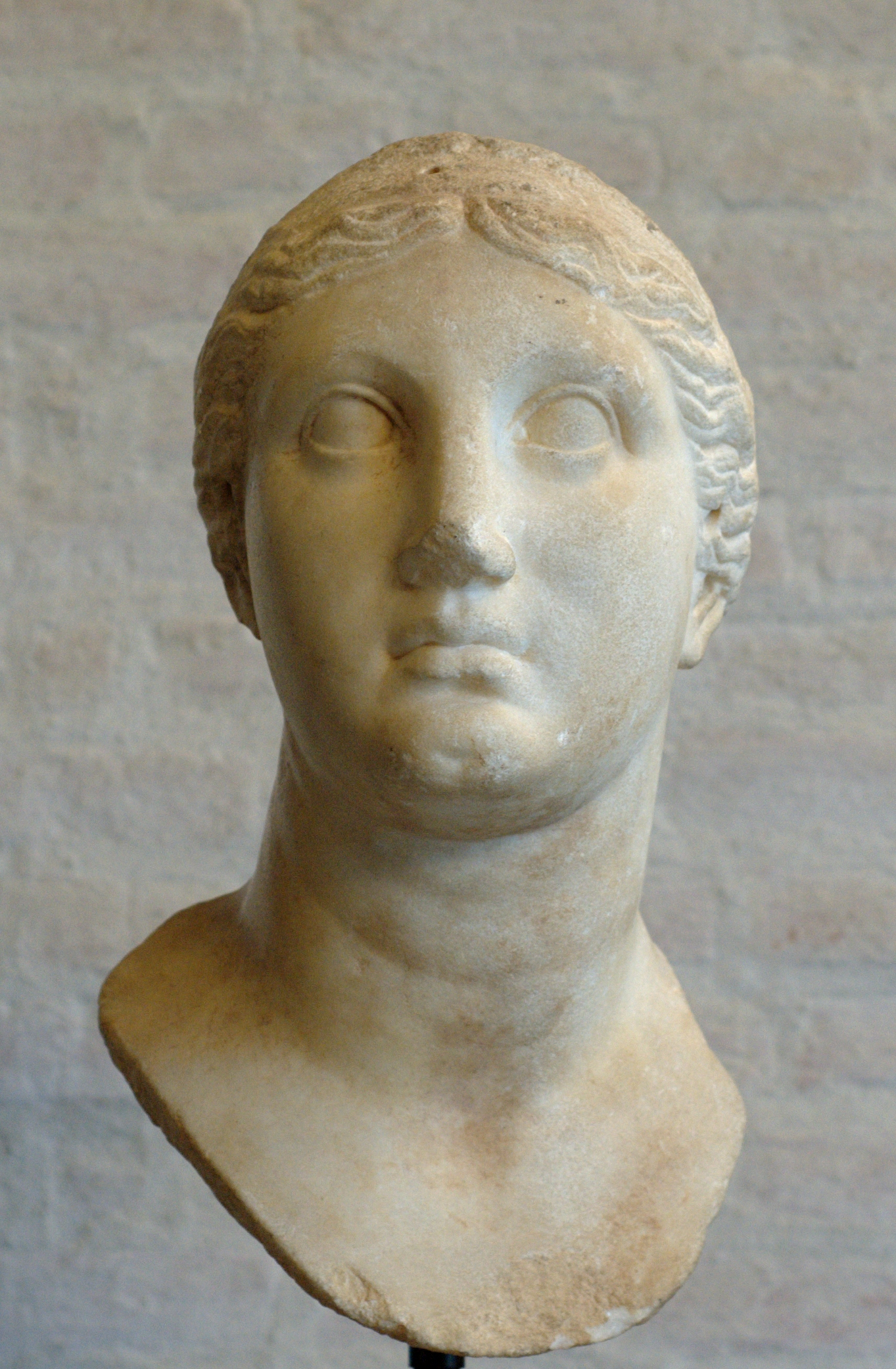
Bust of Berenice II of Egypt

Coma Berenices has been recognized as an asterism since the Hellenistic period (or much earlier, according to some authors), and is the only modern constellation named for an historic figure. It was introduced to Western astronomy during the third century BC by Conon of Samos, the court astronomer of Egyptian ruler Ptolemy III Euergetes, to honour Ptolemy's consort, Berenice II. Berenice vowed to sacrifice her long hair as a votive offering if Ptolemy returned safely from battle during the Third Syrian War. Modern scholars are uncertain if Berenice made the sacrifice before or after Ptolemy's return; it was suggested that it happened after Ptolemy's return (around March–June or May 245 BC), when Conon presented the asterism jointly with scholar and poet Callimachus during a public evening ceremony. In Callimachus' poem, Aetia (composed around that time), Berenice dedicated her tresses "to all the gods". In Poem 66, the Latin translation by the Roman poet Catullus, and in Hyginus' De Astronomica, she dedicated her tresses to Aphrodite and placed them in the temple of Arsinoe II (identified after Berenice's death with Aphrodite) at Zephyrium. According to De astronomica, by the next morning the tresses had disappeared. Conon proposed that Aphrodite had placed the tresses in the sky as an acknowledgement of Berenice's sacrifice. Callimachus called the asterism plokamos Berenikēs or bostrukhon Berenikēs in Greek, translated into Latin as "Coma Berenices" by Catullus. Hipparchus and Geminus also recognized it as a distinct constellation. Eratosthenes called it "Berenice's Hair" and "Ariadne's Hair", considering it part of the constellation Leo. Similarly, Ptolemy did not include it among his 48 constellations in the Almagest; considering it part of Leo and calling it Plokamos.

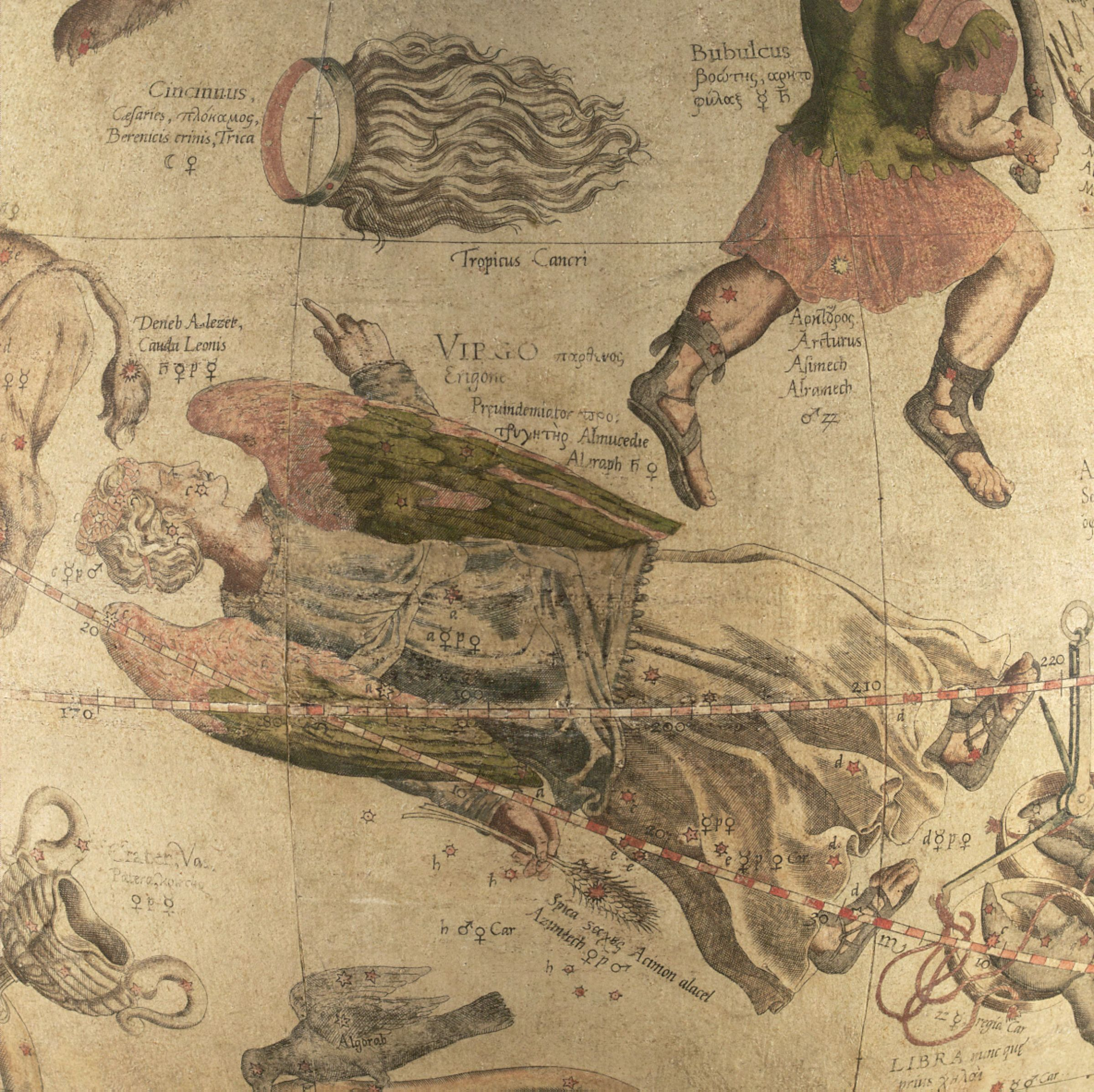
Coma Berenices on Mercator's 1551 celestial globe, in the upper left

Coma Berenices became popular during the 16th century. In 1515, a set of gores by Johannes Schöner labelled the asterism Trica, "hair". In 1536 it appeared on a celestial globe by Caspar Vopel, who is credited with the asterism's designation as a constellation. That year, it also appeared on a celestial map by Petrus Apianus as "Crines Berenices". In 1551, Coma Berenices appeared on a celestial globe by Gerardus Mercator with five Latin and Greek names: Cincinnus, caesaries, πλόκαμος, Berenicis crinis and Trica. Mercator's reputation as a cartographer ensured the constellation's inclusion on Dutch sky globes beginning in 1589.

Tycho Brahe, also credited with Coma's designation as a constellation, included it in his 1602 star catalogue. Brahe recorded fourteen stars in the constellation; Johannes Hevelius increased its number to twenty-one, and John Flamsteed to forty-three. Coma Berenices also appeared in Johann Bayer's 1603 Uranometria, and a few other 17th-century celestial maps followed suit. Coma Berenices and the now-obsolete Antinous are considered the first post-Ptolemaic constellations depicted on a celestial globe. With Antinous, Coma Berenices exemplified a trend in astronomy in which globe- and map-makers continued to rely on the ancients for data. This trend ended at the turn of the 16th century with observations of the southern sky and the work of Tycho Brahe.

Before the 18th century Coma Berenices was known in English by several names, including "Berenice's Bush" and "Berenice's periwig". The earliest-known English name, "Berenices haire", dates to 1601. By 1702 the constellation was known as Coma Berenices, and appears as such in the 1731 Universal Etymological English Dictionary.

=== In non-Western astronomy ===
Coma Berenices was known to the Akkadians as Ḫegala. In Babylonian astronomy a star, known as ḪÉ.GÁL-a-a (translated as "which is before it") or MÚL.ḪÉ.GÁL-a-a, is tentatively considered part of Coma Berenices. It was also argued that Coma Berenices appears in Egyptian Ramesside star clocks as sbꜣw ꜥšꜣw, meaning "many stars".

In Arabic astronomy Coma Berenices was known as Al-Dafira الضفيرة ("braid"), Al-Hulba الهلبة and Al-Thu'aba الذؤابة (both meaning "tuft"), the latter two are translations of the Ptolemaic Plokamos, forming the tuft of the constellation Leo and including most of the Flamsteed-designated stars (particularly 12, 13, 14, 16, 17, 18 and 21 Comae Berenices). Al-Sufi included it in Leo. Ulugh Beg, however, regarded Al-Dafira as consisting of two stars, 7 and 23 Comae Berenices. R. H. Allen's Star Names gives the name Al Ḍafīrah to 15 = Gamma Comae Berenices.

The North American Pawnee people depicted Coma Berenices as ten faint stars on a tanned elk-skin star map dated to at least the 17th century. In the South American Kalina mythology, the constellation was known as ombatapo (face).

The constellation was also recognized by several Polynesian peoples. The people of Tonga had four names for Coma Berenices: Fatana-lua, Fata-olunga, Fata-lalo and Kapakau-o-Tafahi. The Boorong people called the constellation Tourt-chinboiong-gherra, and saw it as a small flock of birds drinking rainwater from a puddle in the crotch of a tree. The people of the Pukapuka atoll may have called it Te Yiku-o-te-kiole, although sometimes this name is associated with Ursa Major.

== Characteristics ==
Coma Berenices is bordered by Boötes to the east, Canes Venatici to the north, Leo to the west and Virgo to the south. Covering 386.5 square degrees and 0.937% of the night sky, it ranks 42nd of the 88 constellations by area. The three-letter abbreviation for the constellation, as adopted by the International Astronomical Union in 1922, is "Com". The official constellation boundaries, as set by Belgian astronomer Eugène Delporte in 1930, (Note: Delporte had proposed standardising the constellation boundaries to the International Astronomical Union, who had agreed and gave him the lead role) are defined by a polygon of 12 segments (illustrated in infobox). In the equatorial coordinate system, the right ascension coordinates of these borders lie between 11^{h} 58^{m} 25.09^{s} and 13^{h} 36^{m} 06.94^{s}, and the declination coordinates are between +13.30° and +33.31°. Coma Berenices is wholly visible to observers north of latitude 56°S. (Note: While parts of the constellation technically rise above the horizon to observers between 56°S and 77°S, stars within a few degrees of the horizon are to all intents and purposes unobservable.) and the constellation's midnight culmination occurs on 2 April.

== Features ==
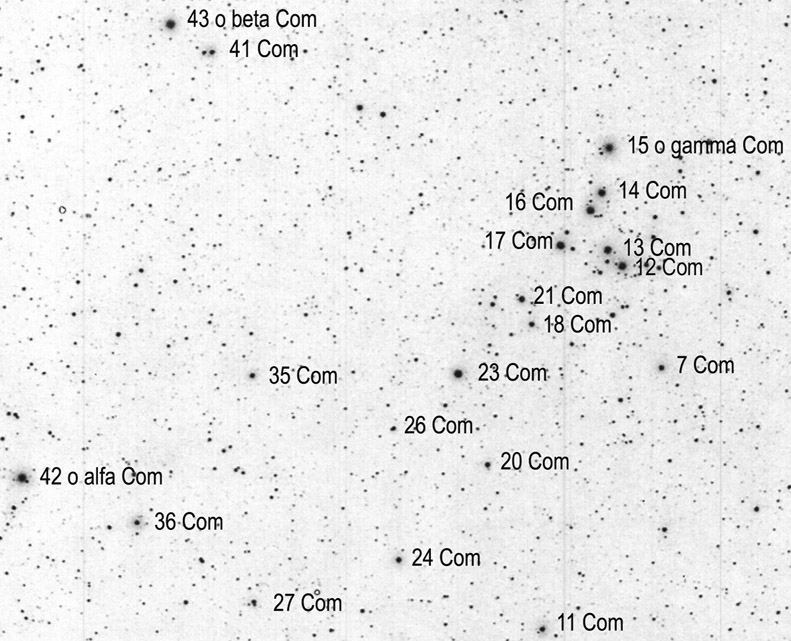
Coma Berenices' major stars

Although it is not large, Coma Berenices contains one galactic supercluster, two galactic clusters, one star cluster and eight Messier objects (including several globular clusters). These objects can be seen with minimal obscuration by dust because the constellation is not in the direction of the galactic plane. Because of that, there are few open clusters (except for the Coma Berenices Cluster, which dominates the northern part of the constellation), diffuse nebulae or planetary nebulae. Coma Berenices contains the North Galactic Pole at right ascension 12^{h} 51^{m} 25^{s} and declination +27° 07′ 48″ (epoch J2000.0).

=== Stars ===
==== Brightest stars ====
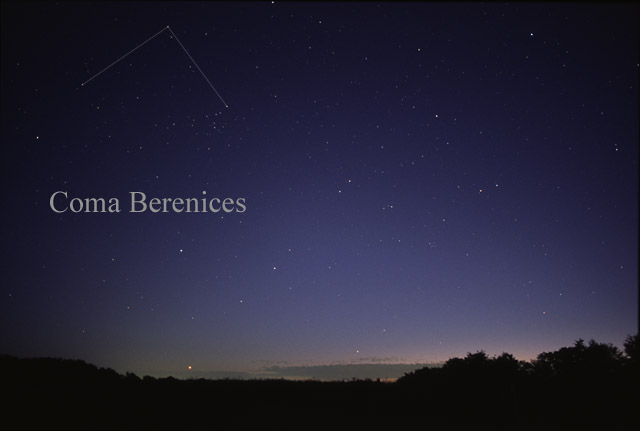
Coma Berenices as seen by the naked eye

Coma Berenices is not particularly bright, as none of its stars are brighter than fourth magnitude, although there are 66 stars brighter than or equal to apparent magnitude 6.5. (Note: Objects of magnitude 6.5 are among the faintest visible to the unaided eye in suburban–rural transition night skies.)

The constellation's brightest star is Beta Comae Berenices (43 Comae Berenices in Flamsteed designation), at magnitude 4.2 and with a high proper motion. In Coma Berenices' northeastern region, it is 29.95 ± 0.10 light-years from Earth. A solar analog, it is a yellow-white G-type main sequence star with a spectral class of G0V. Beta Comae Berenices is around 36% brighter, and 15% more massive than the Sun, and with a radius 10% larger.

The second-brightest star in Coma Berenices is the 4.3-magnitude, yellow-white Alpha Comae Berenices (42 Comae Berenices), with the proper name Diadem, in the southeastern part of the constellation. Despite its Alpha Bayer designation, the star is dimmer than Beta Comae Berenices, being one of the cases where designation does not correspond to the brightest star. It is a double star, with the spectral classes of F5V and F6V. The star system is 58.1 ± 0.9 light-years from Earth.

Gamma Comae Berenices (15 Comae Berenices) is an orange-hued giant star with a magnitude of 4.4 and a spectral class of K1III Fe0.5. In the southwestern part of the constellation, it is 167 +-3 light-years from Earth, Estimated to be around 1.79 times as massive as the Sun, it has expanded to around 10 times its radius. With Alpha Comae Berenices and Beta Comae Berenices, Gamma Comae Berenices forms a 45-degree isosceles triangle from which Berenice's imaginary tresses hang.

==== Star systems ====
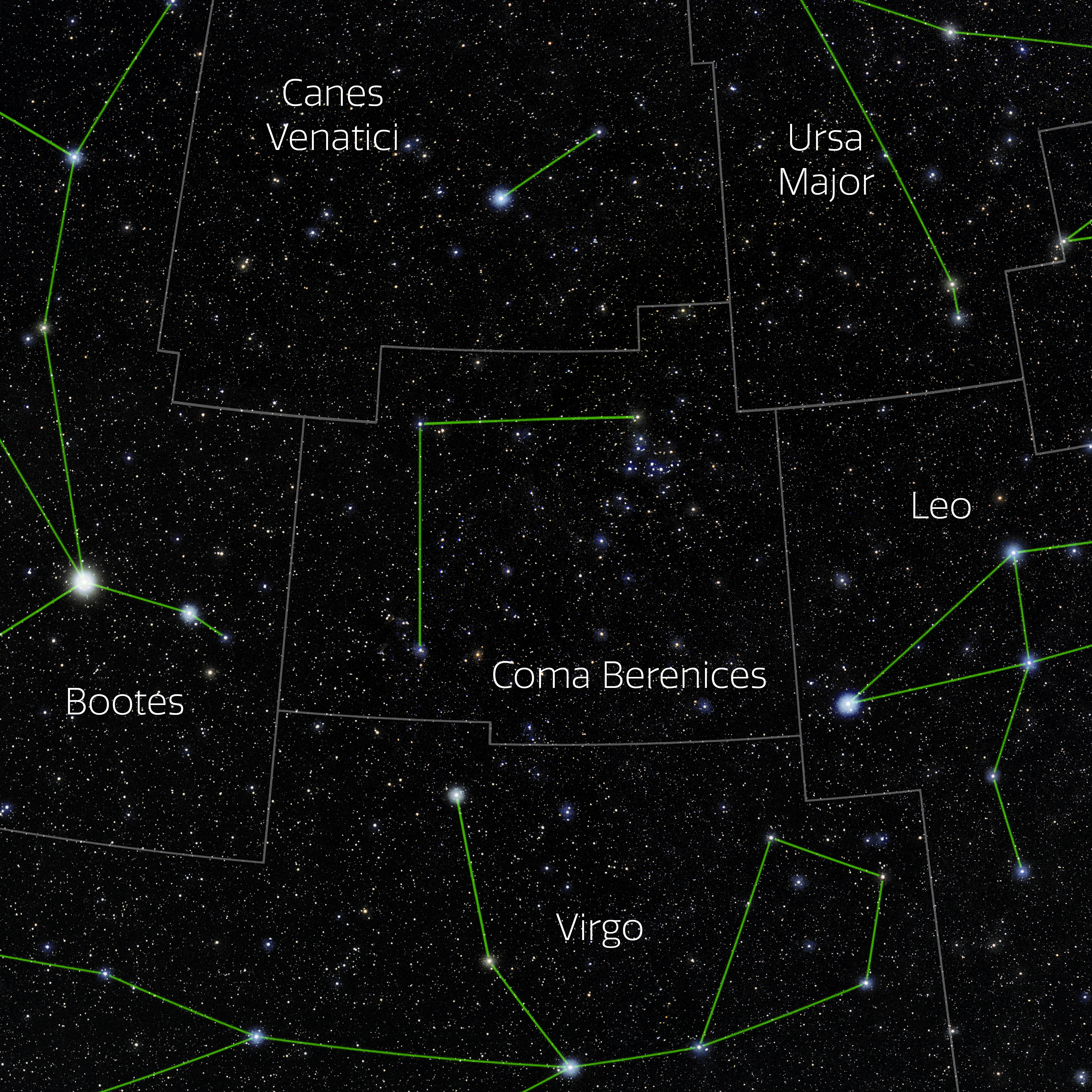
The constellation Coma Berenices showing the IAU boundaries, the constellation stick figure, and labels for its brightest stars. Astrophotograph by Eckhard Slawik, from NOIRLab's 88 Constellations project.

The star systems of Coma Berenices include binary, double and triple stars. 21 Comae Berenices (sometimes called Kissin, but this name is shared with 23 Comae Berenices, then the proper name is Phyllon Kissinou since 16 May 2024) is a close binary with nearly equal components and an orbital period of 26 years. The system is 272 ± 3 light-years away. The Coma Cluster contains at least eight spectroscopic binaries, and the constellation has seven eclipsing binaries: CC, DD, EK, RW, RZ, SS and UX Comae Berenices.

There are over thirty double stars in Coma Berenices, including 24 Comae Berenices with contrasting colors. Its primary is an orange-hued giant star with a magnitude of 5.0, 610 light-years from Earth, and its secondary is a blue-white-hued star with a magnitude of 6.6. Triple stars include 12 Comae Berenices, 17 Comae Berenices, KR Comae Berenices and Struve 1639.

==== Variable stars ====
Over 200 variable stars are known in Coma Berenices, although many are obscure. Alpha Comae Berenices is a possible Algol variable. FK Comae Berenices, which varies from magnitude 8.14 to 8.33 over a period of 2.4 days, is the prototype for the FK Comae Berenices class of variable stars and the star in which the "flip-flop phenomenon" was discovered. FS Comae Berenices is a semi-regular variable, a red giant with a period of about two months whose magnitude varies between 6.1 and 5.3. R Comae Berenices is a Mira variable with a maximum magnitude of almost 7. There are 123 RR Lyrae variables in the constellation, with many in the M53 cluster. One of these stars, TU Comae Berenices, may have a binary system. The M100 galaxy contains about twenty Cepheid variables, which were observed by the Hubble Space Telescope. Coma Berenices also contains Alpha^{2} Canum Venaticorum variables, such as 13 Comae Berenices and AI Comae Berenices.

In 2019 scientists at Aryabhatta Research Institute of Observational Sciences announced the discovery of 28 new variable stars in Coma Berenices' globular cluster NGC 4147.

==== Supernovae ====
A number of supernovae have been discovered in Coma Berenices. Four (SN 1940B, SN 1969H, SN 1987E and SN 1999gs) were in the NGC 4725 galaxy, and another four were discovered in the M99 galaxy (NGC 4254): SN 1967H, SN 1972Q, SN 1986I and SN 2014L. Five were discovered in the M100 galaxy (NGC 4321): SN 1901B, SN 1914A, SN 1959E, SN 1979C and SN 2006X. SN 1940B, discovered on 5 May 1940, was the first observed type II supernova. SN 2005ap, discovered on 3 March 2005, is the second-brightest-known supernova to date with a peak absolute magnitude of about −22.7. Due to its great distance from Earth (4.7 billion light-years), it was not visible to the naked eye and was discovered telescopically. SN 1979C, discovered in 1979, retained its original X-ray brightness for 25 years despite fading in visible light.

==== Other stars ====
Coma Berenices also contains the neutron star RBS 1223 and the pulsar PSR B1237+25. RBS 1223 is a member of the Magnificent Seven, a group of young neutron stars. In 1975, the first extra-solar source of extreme ultraviolet, the white dwarf HZ 43, was discovered in Coma Berenices. In 1995, there was a very rare outburst of the WZ Sagittae-type dwarf nova AL Comae Berenices. A June 2003 outburst from GO Comae Berenices, an SU Ursae Majoris-type dwarf nova, was photometrically observed.

=== Exoplanets ===
Coma Berenices has seven known exoplanets. One, HD 108874 b, has Earth-like insolation. WASP-56 is a sun-like star of spectral type G6 and apparent magnitude 11.48 with a planet 0.6 the mass of Jupiter that has a period of 4.6 days.

=== Star clusters ===
==== Coma Star Cluster ====
The Coma Star Cluster represents Berenice's sacrificed tresses and as a naked eye object has been known since antiquity, appearing in Ptolemy's Almagest. It doesn't have a Messier or NGC designation, but is in the Melotte catalogue of open clusters (designated Melotte 111) and is also catalogued as Collinder 256. It is a large, diffuse open cluster of about 50 stars ranging between magnitudes five and ten, including several of Coma Berenices' stars which are visible to the naked eye. The cluster is spread over a huge region (more than five degrees across) near Gamma Comae Berenices. It has such a large apparent size because it is relatively close, only 280 light-years or 86 parsecs away.

==== Globular clusters ====
M53 (NGC 5024) is a globular cluster which was discovered independently by Johann Elert Bode in 1775 and Charles Messier in February 1777; William Herschel was the first to resolve it into stars. The magnitude-7.7 cluster is 56,000 light-years from Earth. Only 1° away is NGC 5053, a globular cluster with a sparser nucleus of stars. Its total luminosity is the equivalent of about 16,000 suns, one of the lowest luminosities of any globular cluster. It was discovered by William Herschel in 1784. NGC 4147 is a somewhat dimmer globular cluster, with a much-smaller apparent size and an apparent magnitude of 10.7.

=== Galaxies ===
==== Coma Supercluster ====
The Coma Supercluster, itself part of the Coma Filament, contains the Coma and Leo Cluster of galaxies. The Coma Cluster (Abell 1656) is 230 to 300 million light-years away. It is one of the largest-known clusters, with at least 10,000 galaxies (mainly elliptical, with a few spiral galaxies). Due to its distance from Earth, most of the galaxies are visible only through large telescopes. Its brightest members are NGC 4874 and NGC 4889, both with a magnitude of 13; most others are magnitude 15 or dimmer. NGC 4889 is a giant elliptical galaxy with one of the largest-known black holes (21 billion solar masses), and NGC 4921 is the cluster's brightest spiral galaxy. After observing the Coma Cluster, astronomer Fritz Zwicky first postulated the existence of dark matter during the 1930s. The massive galaxy Dragonfly 44 discovered in 2015 was found to consist almost entirely of dark matter. Its mass is very similar to that of the Milky Way, but it emits only 1% of the light emitted by the Milky Way. NGC 4676, sometimes called the Mice Galaxies, is a pair of interacting galaxies 300 million light-years from Earth. Its progenitor galaxies were spiral, and astronomers estimate that they had their closest approach about 160 million years ago. That approach triggered large regions of star formation in both galaxies, with long "tails" of dust, stars and gas. The two progenitor galaxies are predicted to interact significantly at least one more time before they merge into a larger, probably-elliptical galaxy.

==== Virgo Cluster ====
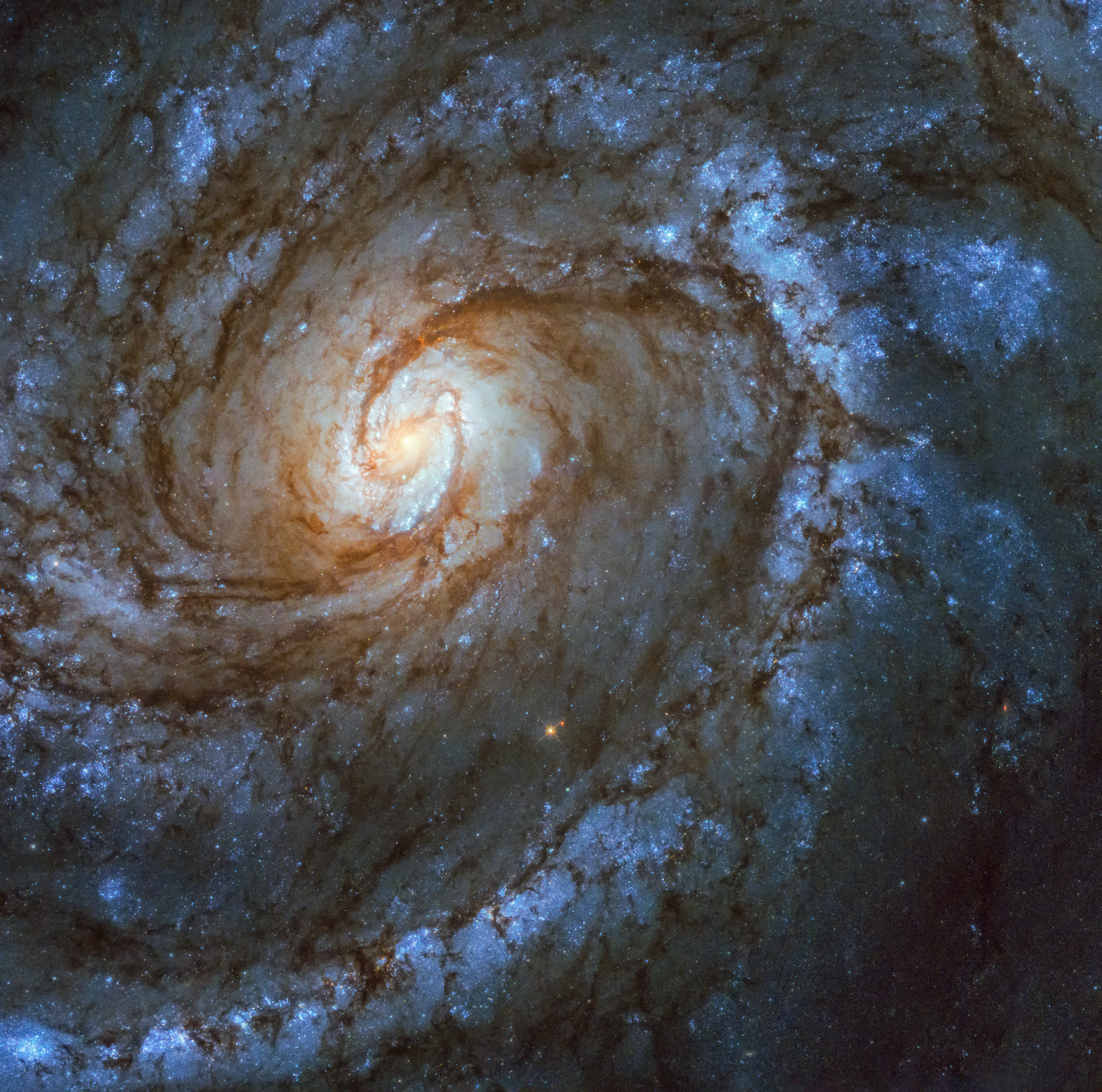
Messier 100 taken with Hubble's Wide Field Camera 3

Coma Berenices contains the northern portion of the Virgo Cluster (also known as the Coma–Virgo Cluster), about 60 million light-years away. The portion includes six Messier galaxies. M85 (NGC 4382), considered elliptical or lenticular, is one of the cluster's brighter members at magnitude nine. M85 is interacting with the spiral galaxy NGC 4394 and the elliptical galaxy MCG-3-32-38. However, it is relatively isolated from the rest of the cluster. M88 (NGC 4501) is a multi-arm spiral galaxy seen at about 30° from edge-on. It has a highly-regular shape with well-developed, symmetrical arms. Among the first galaxies recognized as spiral, it has a supermassive black hole in its center. M91 (NGC 4548), a barred spiral galaxy with a bright, diffuse nucleus, is the faintest object in Messier's catalog at magnitude 10.2. M98 (NGC 4192), a bright, elongated spiral galaxy seen nearly edge-on, appears elliptical because of its unusual angle. The magnitude-10 galaxy has no redshift. M99 (NGC 4254) is a spiral galaxy seen face-on. Like M98 it is of magnitude-10 and has an unusually long arm on its west side. Four supernovae have been observed in the galaxy. M100 (NGC 4321), a magnitude-nine spiral galaxy seen face-on, is one of the cluster's brightest. Photographs reveal a brilliant core, two prominent spiral arms, an array of secondary arms and several dust lanes.

==== Other galaxies ====
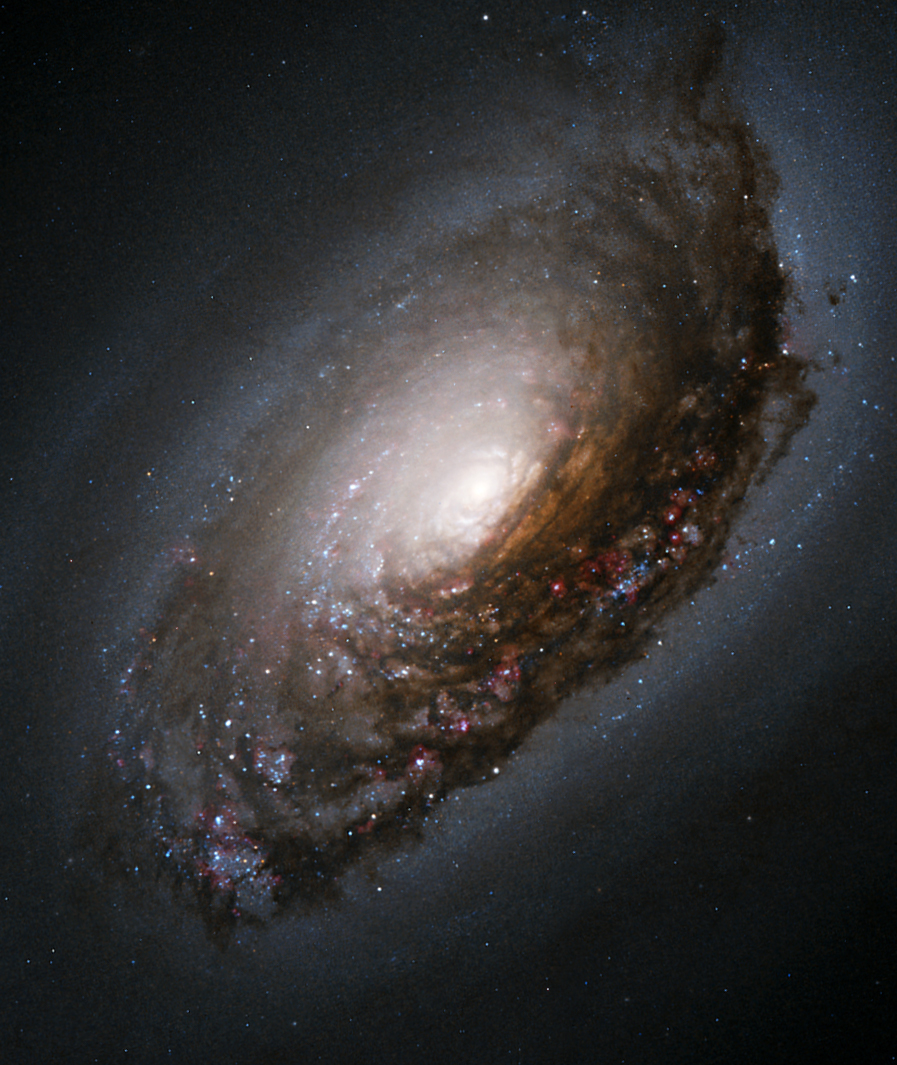
M64 (Black Eye Galaxy)

M64 (NGC 4826) is known as the Black Eye Galaxy because of the prominent dark dust lane in front of the galaxy's bright nucleus. Also known as the Sleeping Beauty and Evil Eye galaxy, it is about 17.3 million light-years away. Recent studies indicate that the interstellar gas in the galaxy's outer regions rotates in the opposite direction from that in the inner regions, leading astronomers to believe that at least one satellite galaxy collided with it less than a billion years ago. All other evidence of the smaller galaxy has been assimilated. At the interface between the clockwise- and counterclockwise-rotating regions are many new nebulae and young stars.

NGC 4314 is a face-on barred spiral galaxy at a distance of 40 million light-years. It is unique for its region of intense star formation, creating a ring around its nucleus which was discovered by the Hubble Space Telescope. The galaxy's prodigious star formation began five million years ago, in a region with a diameter of 1,000 light-years. The core's structure is also unique because the galaxy has spiral arms which feed gas into the bar.

NGC 4414 is an unbarred spiral flocculent galaxy about 62 million light-years away. It is one of the closest flocculent spiral galaxies.

NGC 4565 is an edge-on spiral galaxy which appears superimposed on the Virgo Cluster. NGC 4565 has been nicknamed the Needle Galaxy because when seen in full, it appears as a narrow streak of light. Like many edge-on spiral galaxies, it has a prominent dust lane and a central bulge. NGC 4565 has at least two satellite galaxies, and one of them is interacting with it.

NGC 4651, about the size of the Milky Way, has tidal stellar streams gravitationally stripped from a smaller, satellite galaxy. It is about 62 million light-years away. It is located on the outskirts of the cluster, and is also known as the Umbrella Galaxy. Unlike the other spiral galaxies in the cluster, NGC 4651 is rich in neutral hydrogen, which also extends beyond the optical disk. Its star formation is typical for a galaxy of its type.

Spiral galaxy Malin 1 discovered in 1986 is the first-known giant low-surface-brightness galaxy. With UGC 1382, it is also one of the largest low-surface-brightness galaxies.

In 2006 a dwarf galaxy, also named Coma Berenices, was discovered in the constellation from data obtained by the Sloan Digital Sky Survey. The galaxy is a faint satellite of the Milky Way. It is one of the faintest satellites of the Milky Way - its integrated luminosity is about 3700 times that of the Sun (absolute visible magnitude of about −4.1), which is lower than many globular clusters. A high mass to light ratio may mean that the satellite has large amounts of dark matter.

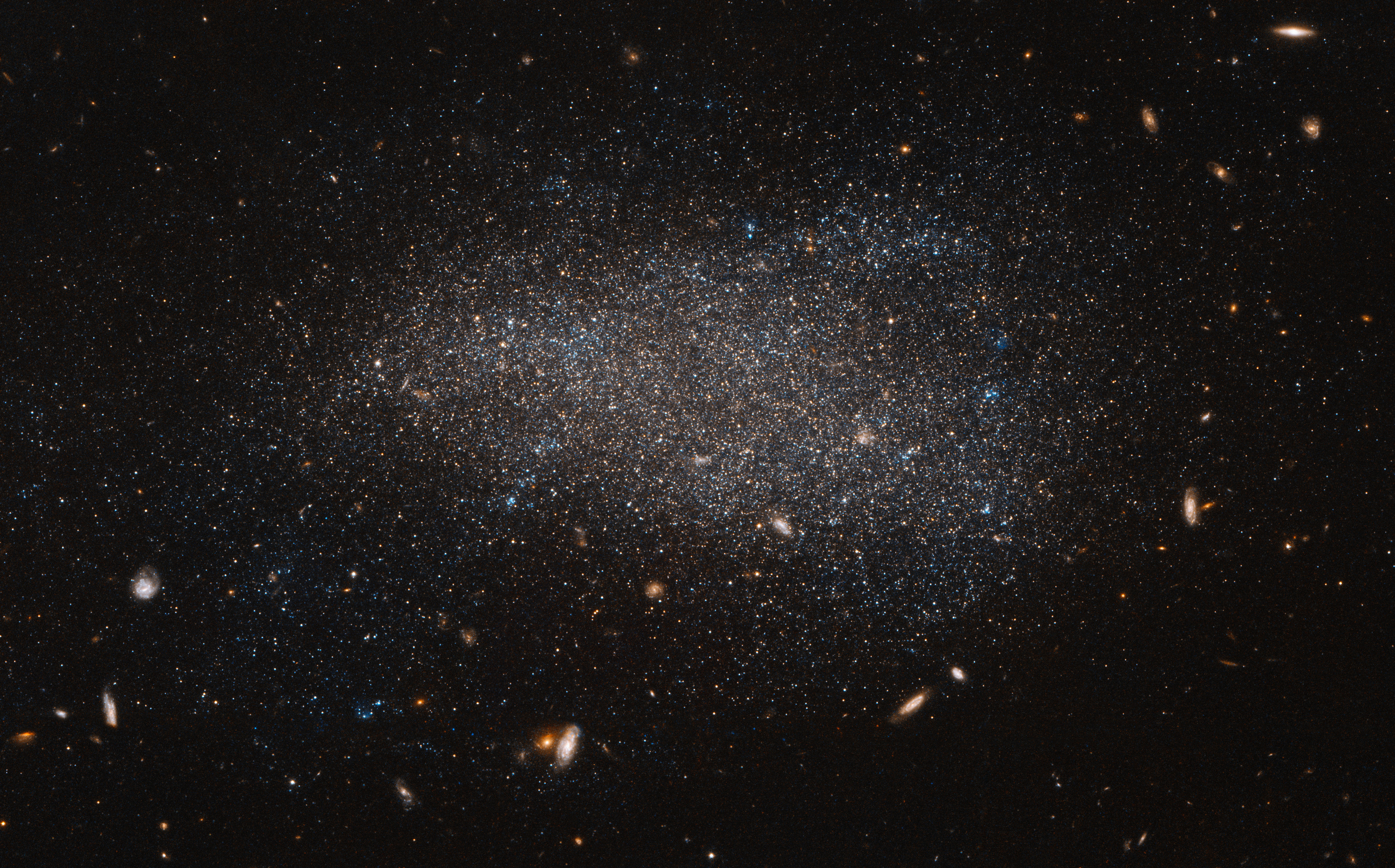
Dwarf irregular galaxy NGC 4789A

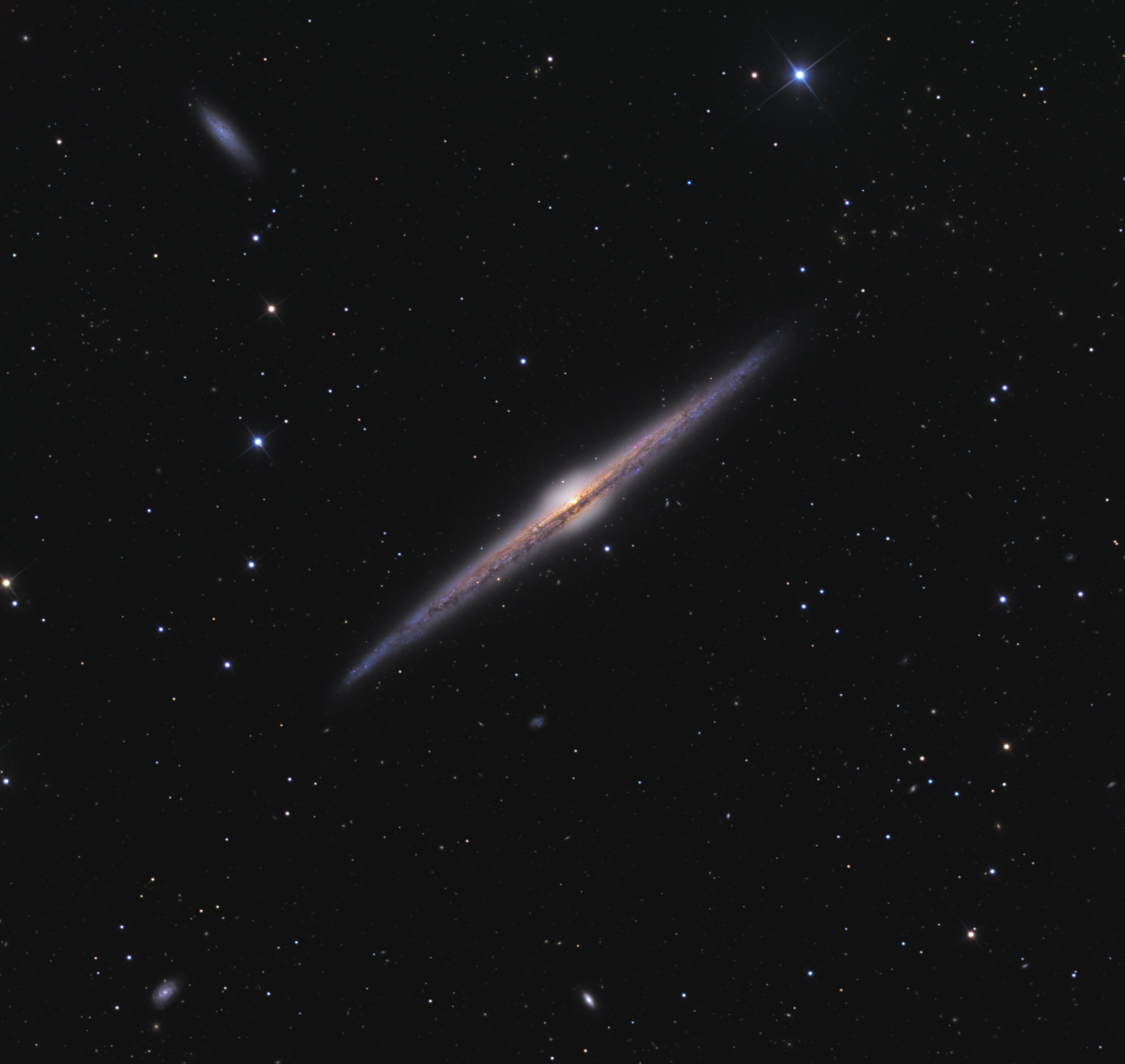
NGC 4565 (Needle Galaxy)

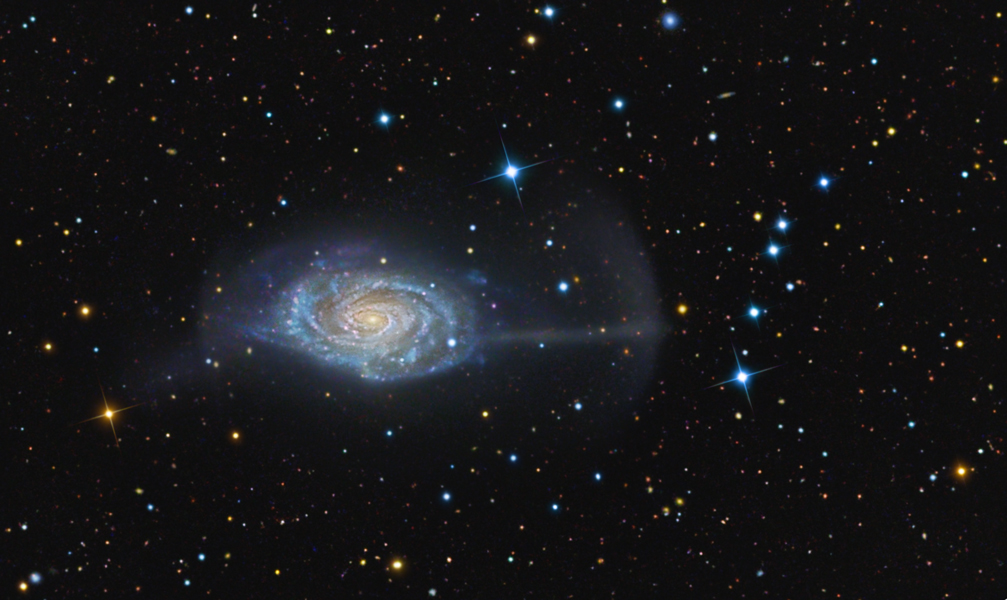
NGC 4651, with umbrella-shaped stellar streams

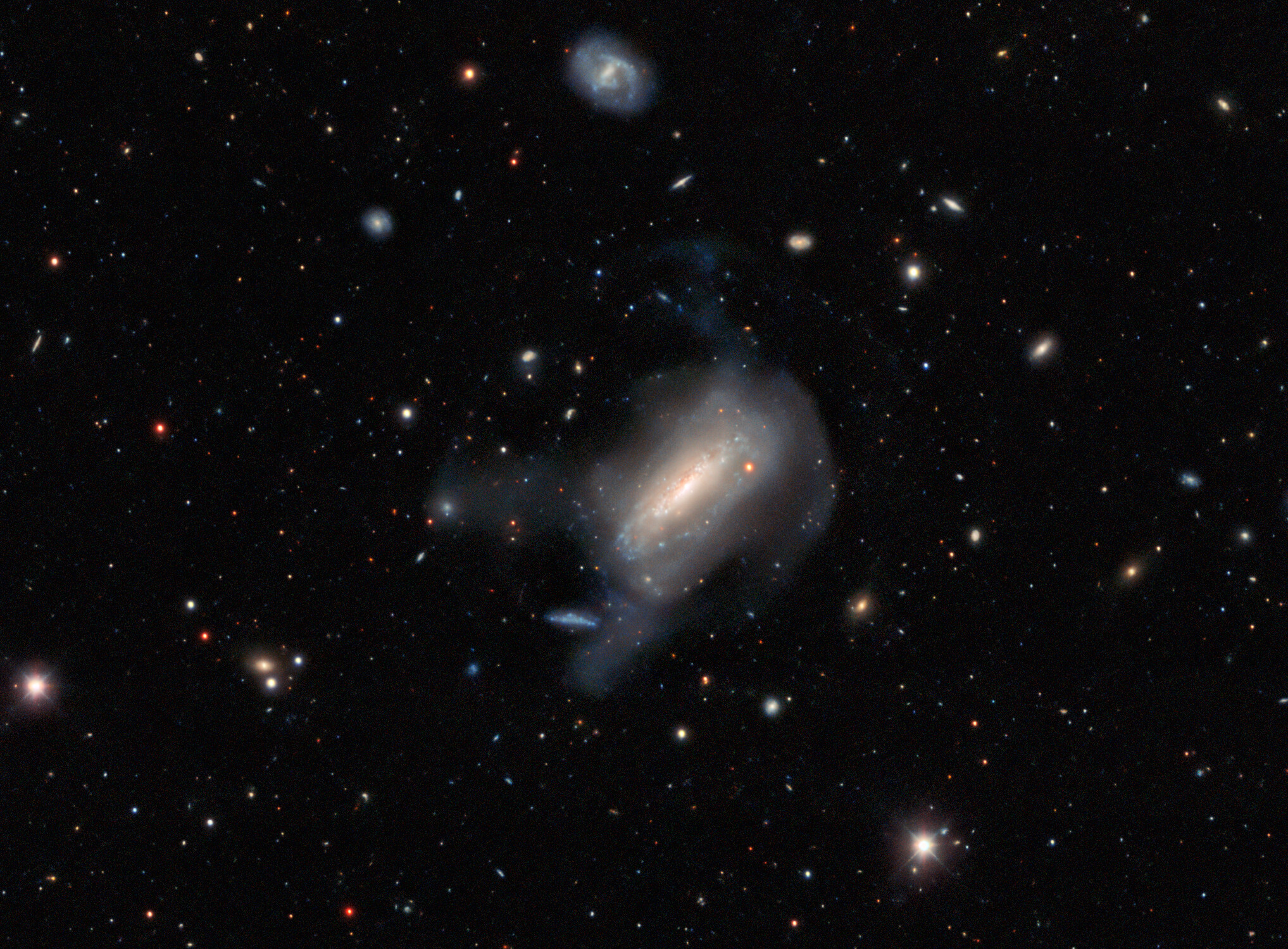
The constellation Coma Berenices hosts the galaxy NGC 4495 among myriad other astronomical objects.

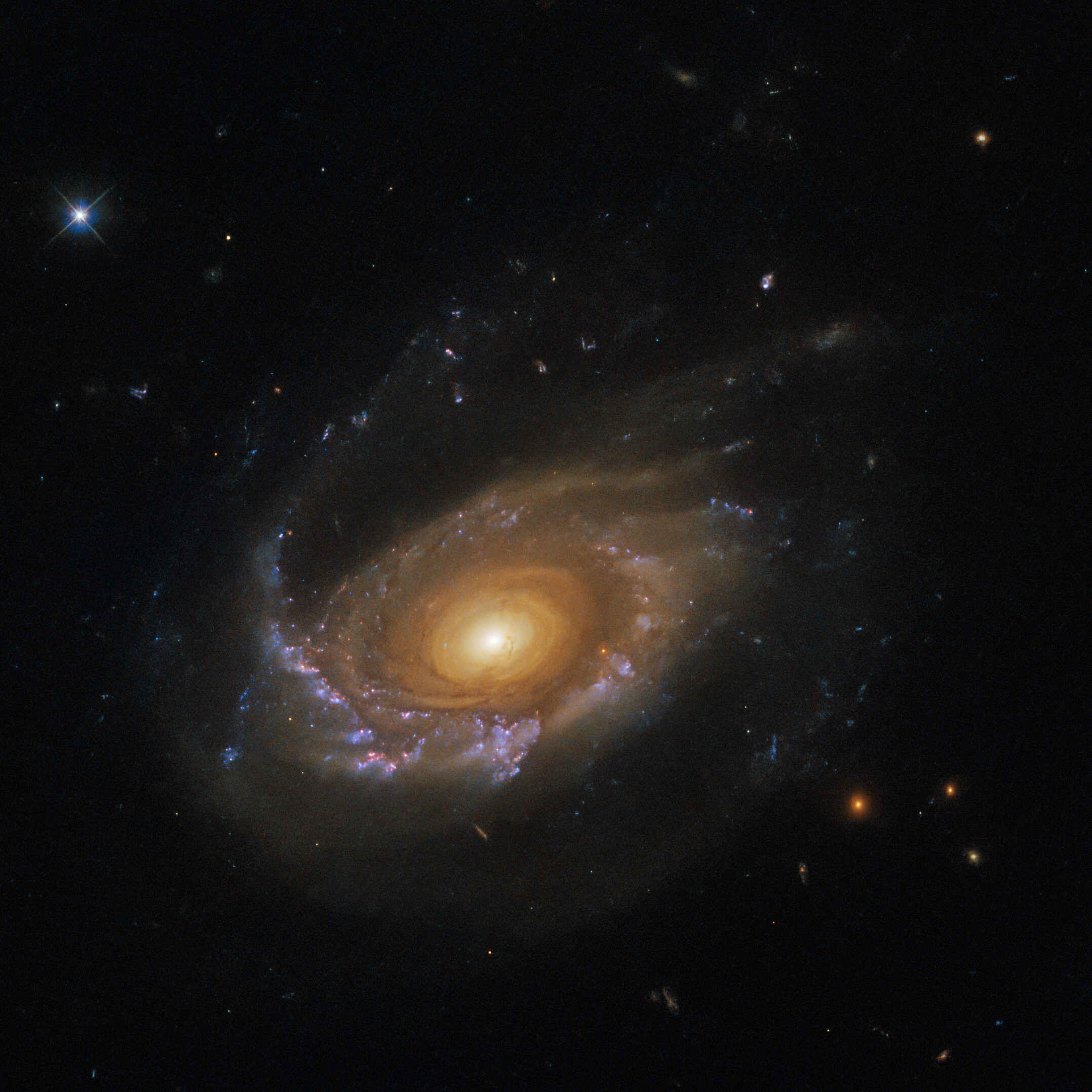
The jellyfish galaxy JW39 hangs serenely in this image from the NASA/ESA Hubble Space Telescope. This galaxy lies over 900 million light-years away in the constellation Coma Berenices.

=== Quasars ===
HS 1216+5032 is a bright, gravitationally lensed pair of quasars. W Comae Berenices (or ON 231), a blazar in the constellation's northwest, was originally designated a variable star and later found to be a BL Lacertae object. As of 2009, it had the most intense gamma ray spectrum of the sixty known gamma-ray blazars.

=== Gamma-ray bursts ===
Some gamma-ray bursts occurred in Coma Berenices, particularly GRB 050509B on 9 May 2005 and GRB 080607 on 7 June 2008. GRB 050509B, which lasted only 0.03 second, became the first short burst with a detected afterglow.

=== Meteor showers ===
The Coma Berenicids meteor shower peaks around 18 January. Despite the shower's low intensity (averaging one or two meteors per hour) its meteors are some of the fastest, with speeds up to 65 kilometres per second (40 mi/s).

== In culture ==
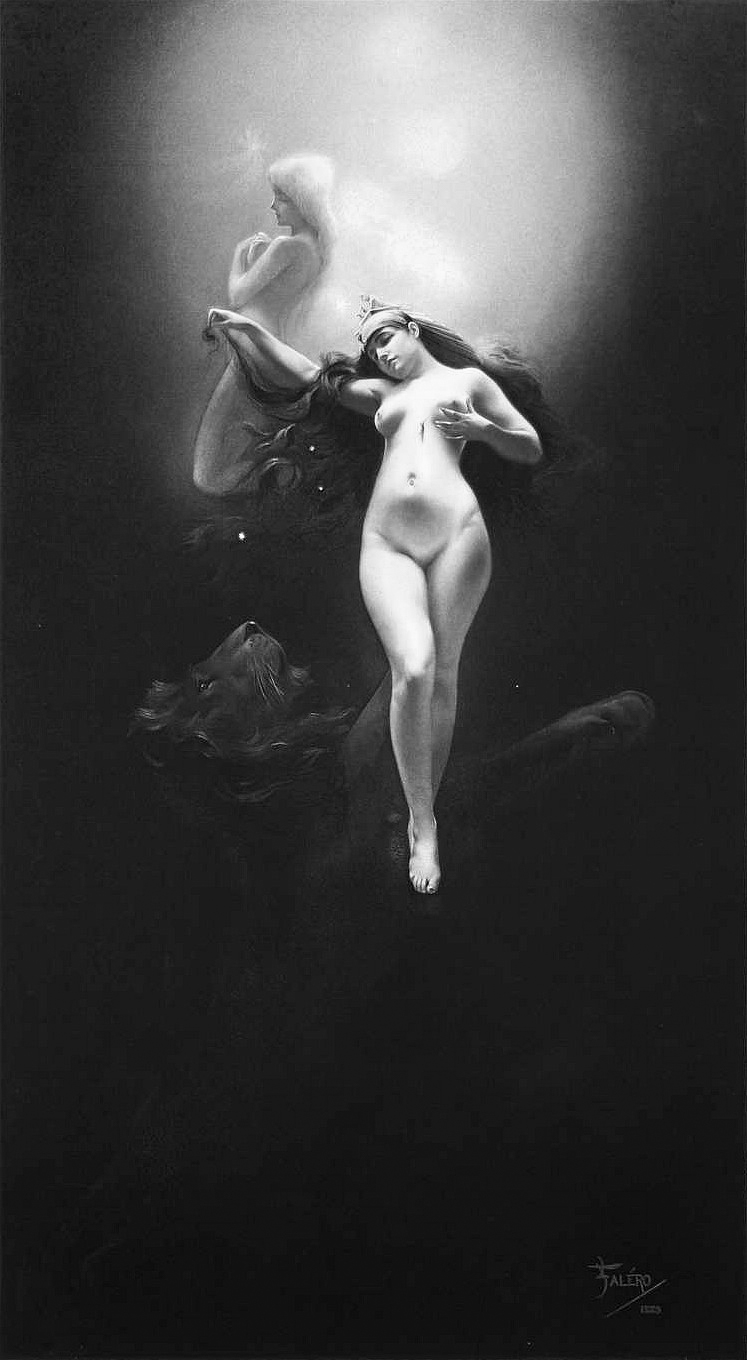
Luis Ricardo Falero's The Hair of Berenice (1886)

Since Callimachus' poem, Coma Berenices has been occasionally featured in culture. Alexander Pope alludes to the legend in the ending of The Rape of the Lock, in which the titular hair is placed among the stars. (The poem would go on to provide the names of some of the moons of Uranus.) In 1886, Spanish artist Luis Ricardo Falero created a mezzotint print personifying Coma Berenices alongside Virgo and Leo. In 1892, the Russian poet Afanasy Fet made the constellation the subject of his short poem, composed for the Countess Natalya Sollogub. The Swedish poet Gunnar Ekelöf wrote the lines "Your friend the comet combed his hair with the Leonids / Berenice let her hair hang down from the sky" in a 1933 poem. American writer and folksinger Richard Fariña mentions Coma Berenices in his 1966 novel Been Down So Long It Looks Like Up To Me, sardonically writing about content typical to upper-level astronomy coursework at Cornell: "It's the advanced courses give you trouble. Relativity principles, spiral nebula in Coma Berenices, that kind of hassle". The Bolivian poet, Pedro Shimose, makes Coma Berenices the home address of his "Señorita NGC 4565" in his poem "Carta a una estrella que vive en otra constelación" ("Letter to a star who lives in another constellation"), included in his 1967 collection, "Sardonia". " The Irish poet W. B. Yeats, in his poem "Her Dream", refers to "Berenice's burning hair" being "nailed upon the night". Francisco Guerrero, a 20th-century Spanish composer, wrote an orchestral work on the constellation in 1996. In 1999 Irish artist Alice Maher made a series of four oversize drawings, entitled Coma Berenices, of entwining black hair coils. The asterism also gives its name to a prose poem in Where Shall I Wander, a 2005 collection by the American writer John Ashbery.

== See also ==
- Coma Star Cluster
- Coma Berenices in Chinese astronomy
- IC 4141
