= NGC 4944 =

Galaxy in the constellation Coma Berenices

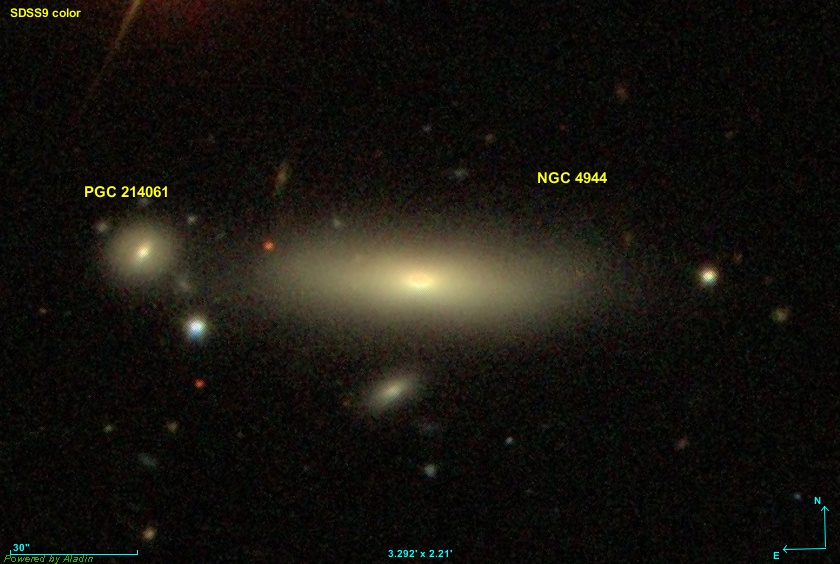
- NGC 4944 imaged by SDSS

Observation data (J2000 epoch)
- Constellation: Coma Berenices
- Right ascension: 13^{h} 03^{m} 49.9481^{s}
- Declination: +28° 11′ 08.490″
- Redshift: 0.023233±0.00000667
- Heliocentric radial velocity: 6,965±2 km/s
- Distance: 324.53 ± 22.85 Mly (99.500 ± 7.006 Mpc)
- Group or cluster: Coma Cluster
- Apparent magnitude (V): 13.5g

Characteristics
- Type: S0/a? edge-on
- Size: ~203,700 ly (62.44 kpc) (estimated)
- Apparent size (V): 1.7′ × 0.6′

Other designations
- 2MASX J13034994+2811089, UGC 8167, MCG +05-31-118, PGC 45133, CGCG 160-124 NED01

NGC 4944 is a large lenticular galaxy in the constellation of Coma Berenices. Its velocity with respect to the cosmic microwave background is 7,230±19 km/s, which corresponds to a Hubble distance of 347.8 ± 24.4 Mly (106.64 ± 7.47 Mpc). Additionally, four non-redshift measurements give a closer mean distance of 324.53 ± 22.85 Mly (99.500 ± 7.006 Mpc). It was discovered by German-British astronomer William Herschel on 11 April 1785.

== NGC 4889 group ==
According to a study by Abraham Mahtessian in 1988, NGC 4944 is a member of the NGC 4889 group. This galaxy group has at least 18 members, including NGC 4789, NGC 4807, NGC 4816, NGC 4819, NGC 4827, NGC 4839, NGC 4841, NGC 4841A, NGC 4848, NGC 4853, NGC 4874, NGC 4889, NGC 4895, NGC 4911, NGC 4926, NGC 4966, and UGC 8017. This group is part of the Coma Cluster.

== Supernova ==
One supernova has been observed in NGC 4944:

- SN 1973F (Type I, mag. 16.79) was discovered by Czech astronomer Luboš Kohoutek on 31 March 1973. Although a spectrogram was never obtained, its light curve suggested it was a 'very slow' supernova of Type I, which reached maximum magnitude of 16.2 on 11 April 1973.

== See also ==
- List of NGC objects (4001–5000)
