= NGC 4872 =

Galaxy in the constellation Coma Berenices

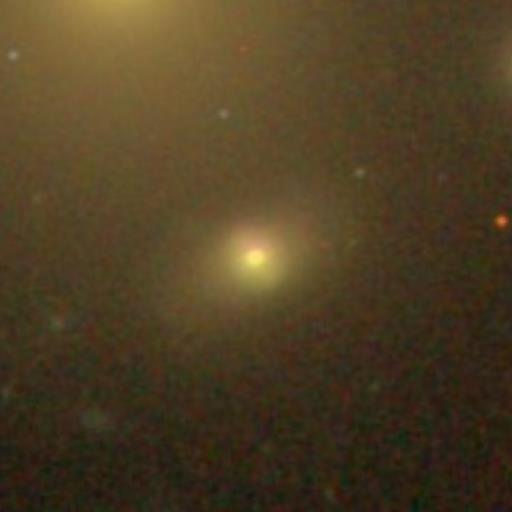
- SDSS image of NGC 4872 (center) with the halo of the giant galaxy NGC 4874 (left).

Observation data (J2000 epoch)
- Constellation: Coma Berenices
- Right ascension: 12^{h} 59^{m} 34.0^{s}
- Declination: 27° 56′ 49″
- Redshift: 0.023993/7193 km/s
- Distance: 310,350,000 ly
- Group or cluster: Coma Cluster
- Apparent magnitude (V): 15.2

Characteristics
- Type: SB0
- Size: ~143,080 ly (estimated)
- Apparent size (V): 0.60 x 0.37

Other designations
- CGCG 160-230, MCG +05-31-068, PGC 44624

NGC 4872 is a barred lenticular galaxy located about 310 million light-years away in the constellation of Coma Berenices. NGC 4872 has been indicated to contain an active galactic nucleus. NGC 4872 was discovered by astronomer Heinrich d'Arrest. It is a member of the Coma Cluster.

== See also ==
- List of NGC objects (4001–5000)
- NGC 4873
- NGC 4889
