= NGC 4871 =

Lenticular galaxy in the constellation Coma Berenices

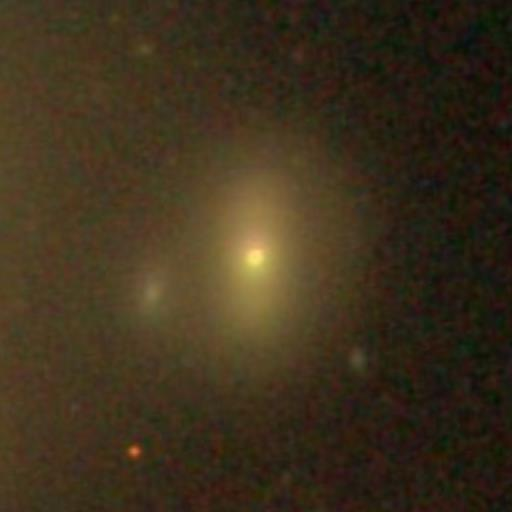
- SDSS image of NGC 4871.

Observation data (J2000 epoch)
- Constellation: Coma Berenices
- Right ascension: 12^{h} 59^{m} 29.9^{s}
- Declination: 27° 57′ 23″
- Redshift: 0.022445/6729 km/s
- Distance: 311 Mly
- Group or cluster: Coma Cluster
- Apparent magnitude (V): 14.9

Characteristics
- Type: SA0
- Size: ~69,760 ly (estimated)
- Apparent size (V): 0.7 x 0.5

Other designations
- CGCG 160-227, DRCG 27-131, MCG 5-31-66, PGC 44606

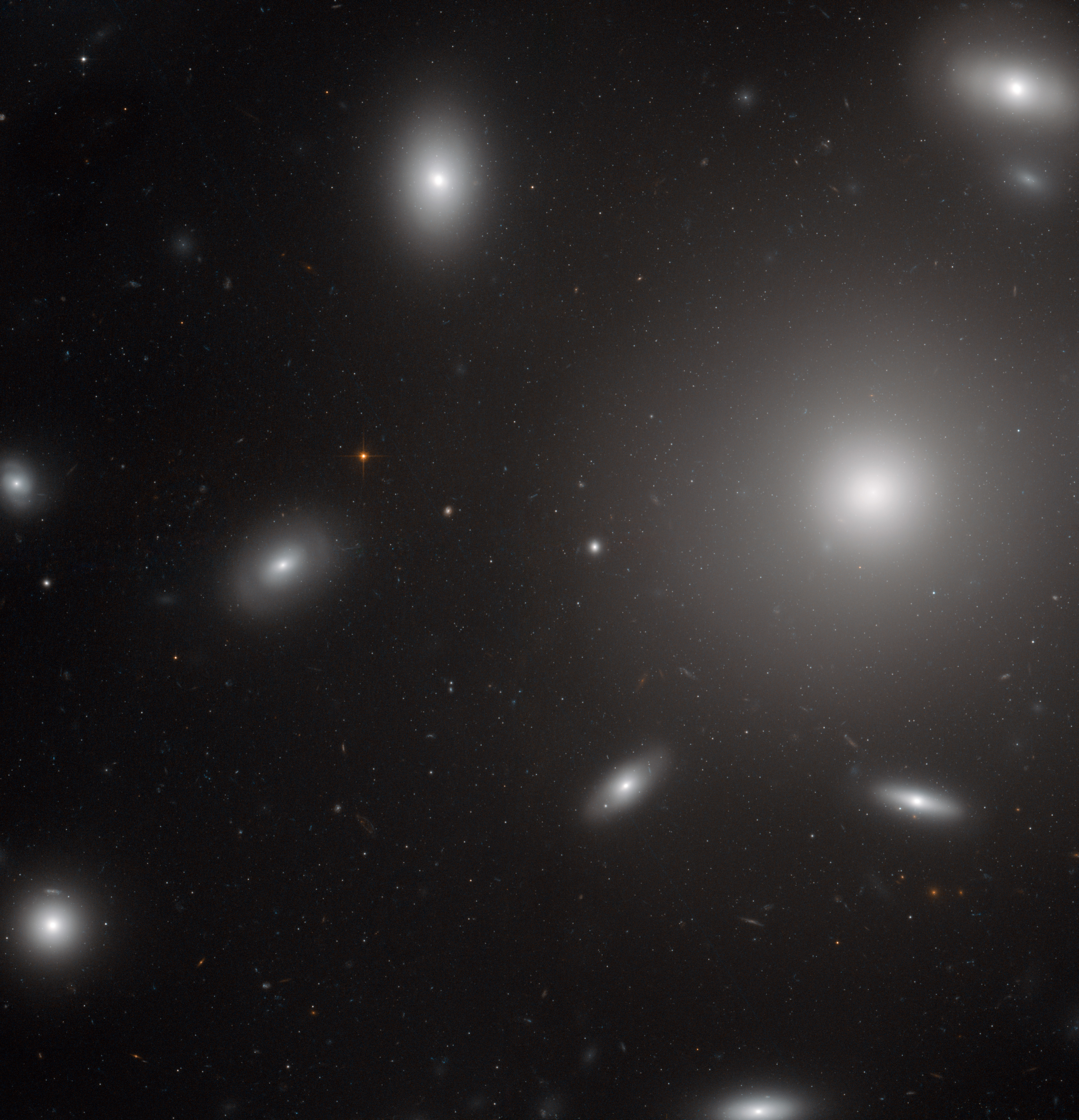
Giant elliptical NGC 4874 dominates the centre of the Coma Cluster. NGC 4871 is in the top right corner.

NGC 4871 is a lenticular galaxy located about 310 million light-years away in the constellation of Coma Berenices. NGC 4871 was discovered by astronomer Heinrich d'Arrest on May 10, 1863. It is a member of the Coma Cluster.

== See also ==
- List of NGC objects (4001–5000)
- NGC 4874
