= NGC 4875 =

Galaxy in the constellation Coma Berenices

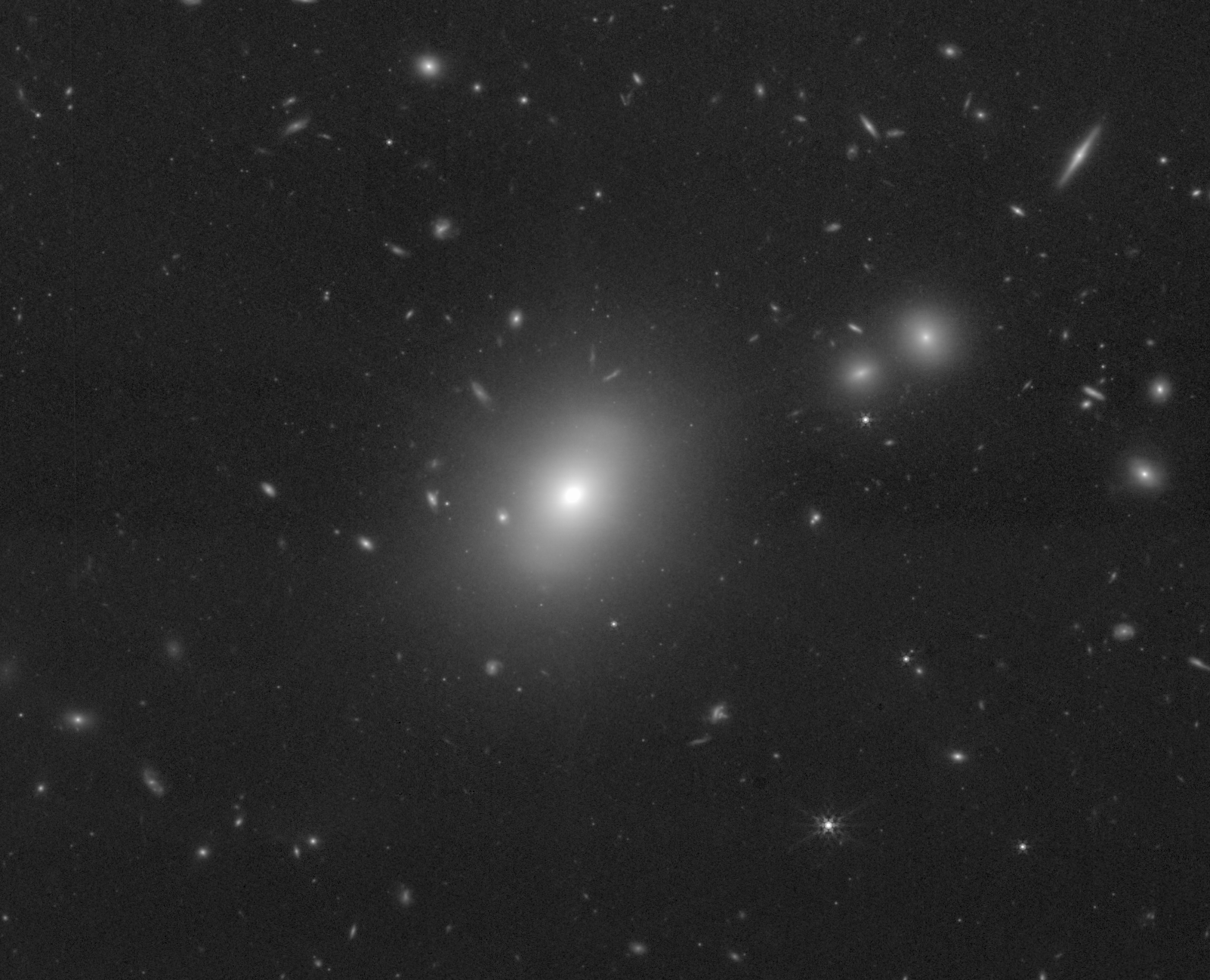
- James Webb Space Telescope image of NGC 4875.

Observation data (J2000 epoch)
- Constellation: Coma Berenices
- Right ascension: 12^{h} 59^{m} 37.9^{s}
- Declination: 27° 54′ 26″
- Redshift: 0.026835
- Heliocentric radial velocity: 8045 km/s
- Distance: 350 Mly (107 Mpc)
- Group or cluster: Coma Cluster
- Apparent magnitude (V): 15.4

Characteristics
- Type: SA0
- Size: ~61,200 ly (18.75 kpc) (estimated)
- Apparent size (V): 0.29 x 0.20

Other designations
- CGCG 160-232, DRCG 27-104, PGC 44640, ZwG 160.232

NGC 4875 is a lenticular galaxy located about 350 million light-years away in the constellation Coma Berenices. NGC 4875 was discovered by astronomer Guillaume Bigourdan on May 16, 1885. The galaxy is a member of the Coma Cluster.

== See also ==
- List of NGC objects (4001–5000)
- NGC 4873
