= NGC 4883 =

Galaxy in the constellation Coma Berenices

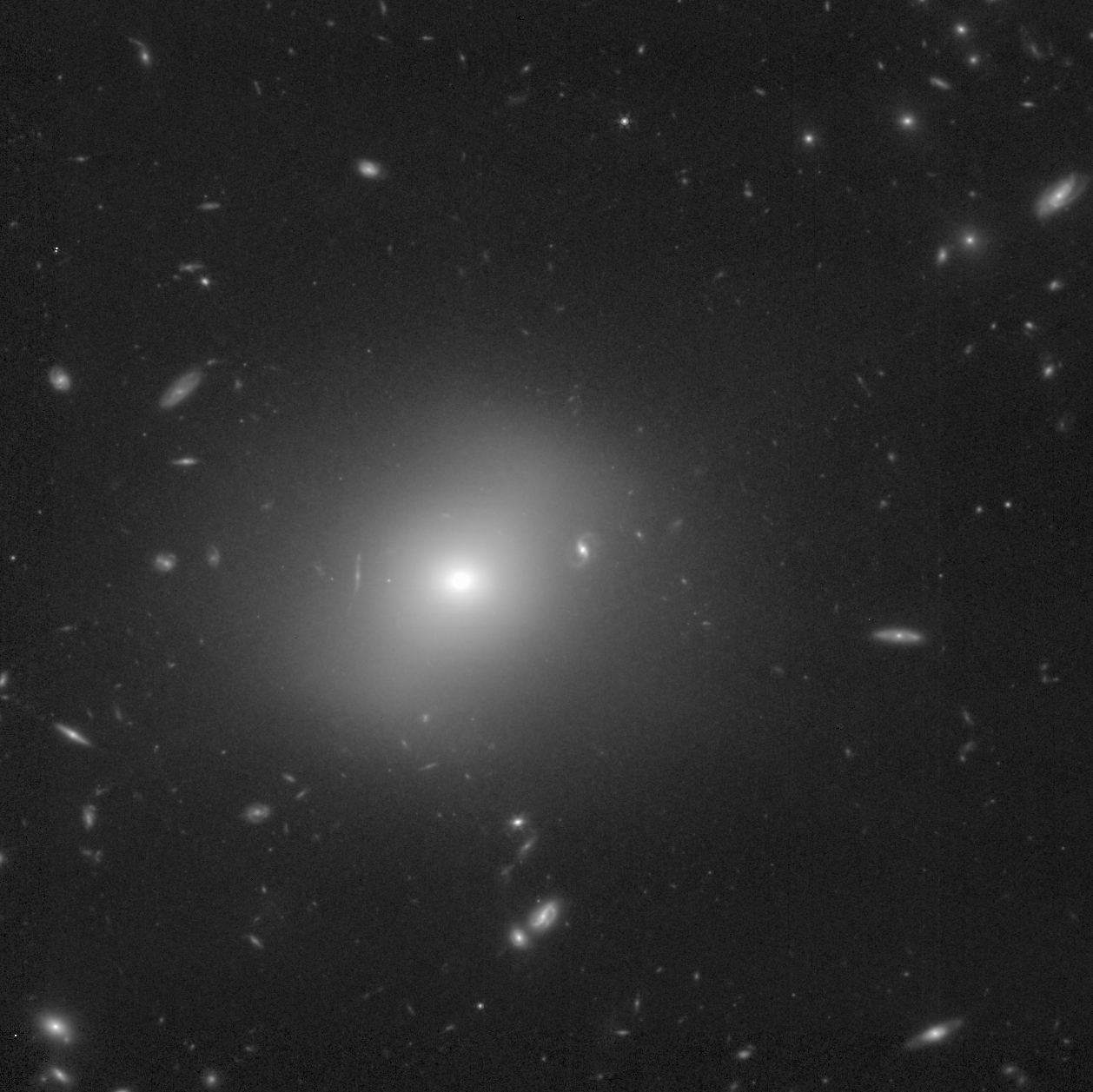
- James Webb Space Telescope image of NGC 4883.

Observation data (J2000 epoch)
- Constellation: Coma Berenices
- Right ascension: 12^{h} 59^{m} 56.0^{s}
- Declination: 28° 02′ 05″
- Redshift: 0.027289
- Heliocentric radial velocity: 8181 km/s
- Distance: 316 Mly (96.8 Mpc)
- Group or cluster: Coma Cluster
- Apparent magnitude (V): 15.0

Characteristics
- Type: SB0
- Size: ~62,500 ly (19.15 kpc) (estimated)
- Apparent size (V): 0.62 x 0.46

Other designations
- CGCG 160-237, DRCG 27-175, PGC 44682

NGC 4883 is a barred lenticular galaxy located about 315 million light-years away in the constellation Coma Berenices. NGC 4883 was discovered by astronomer Heinrich d'Arrest on April 22, 1865. It is a member of the Coma Cluster.

== See also ==
- List of NGC objects (4001–5000)
- NGC 4872
