= NGC 4876 =

Galaxy in the constellation Coma Berenices

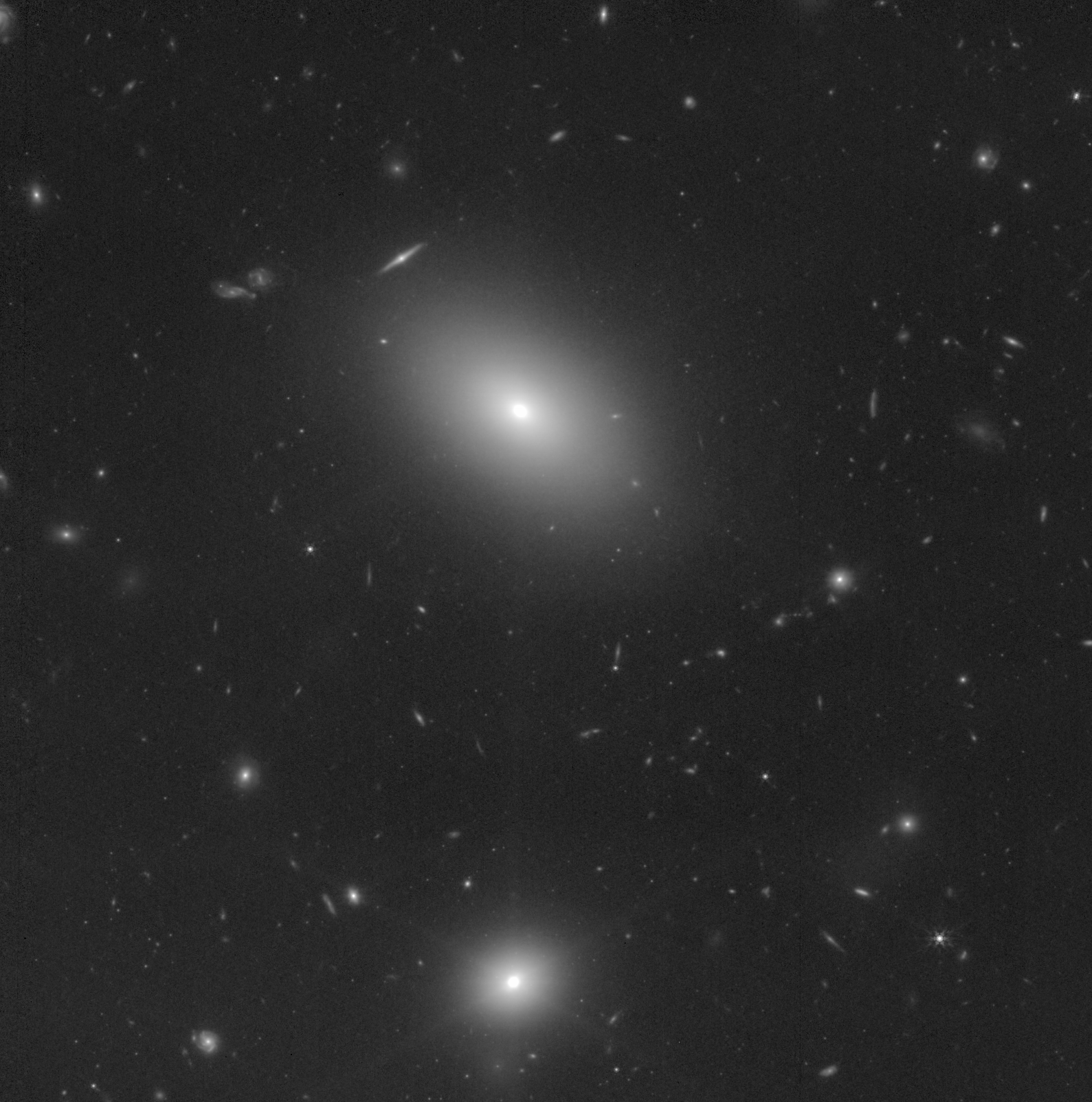
- James Webb Space Telescope image of NGC 4876.

Observation data (J2000 epoch)
- Constellation: Coma Berenices
- Right ascension: 12^{h} 59^{m} 44.4^{s}
- Declination: 27° 54′ 45″
- Redshift: 0.022275
- Heliocentric radial velocity: 6678 km/s
- Distance: 325 Mly (99.5 Mpc)
- Group or cluster: Coma Cluster
- Apparent magnitude (V): 15.1

Characteristics
- Type: E5
- Size: ~75,000 ly (23.00 kpc) (estimated)
- Apparent size (V): 0.58 x 0.40

Other designations
- ARAK 398, CGCG 160-234, DRCG 27-124, MCG 5-31-73, PGC 44658

NGC 4876 is an elliptical galaxy located about 325 million light-years away in the constellation Coma Berenices. NGC 4876 was discovered by astronomer Guillaume Bigourdan on May 16, 1885. NGC 4876 is a member of the Coma Cluster.

== See also ==
- List of NGC objects (4001–5000)
- NGC 4889
