= NGC 4869 =

Elliptical galaxy in the constellation Coma Berenices

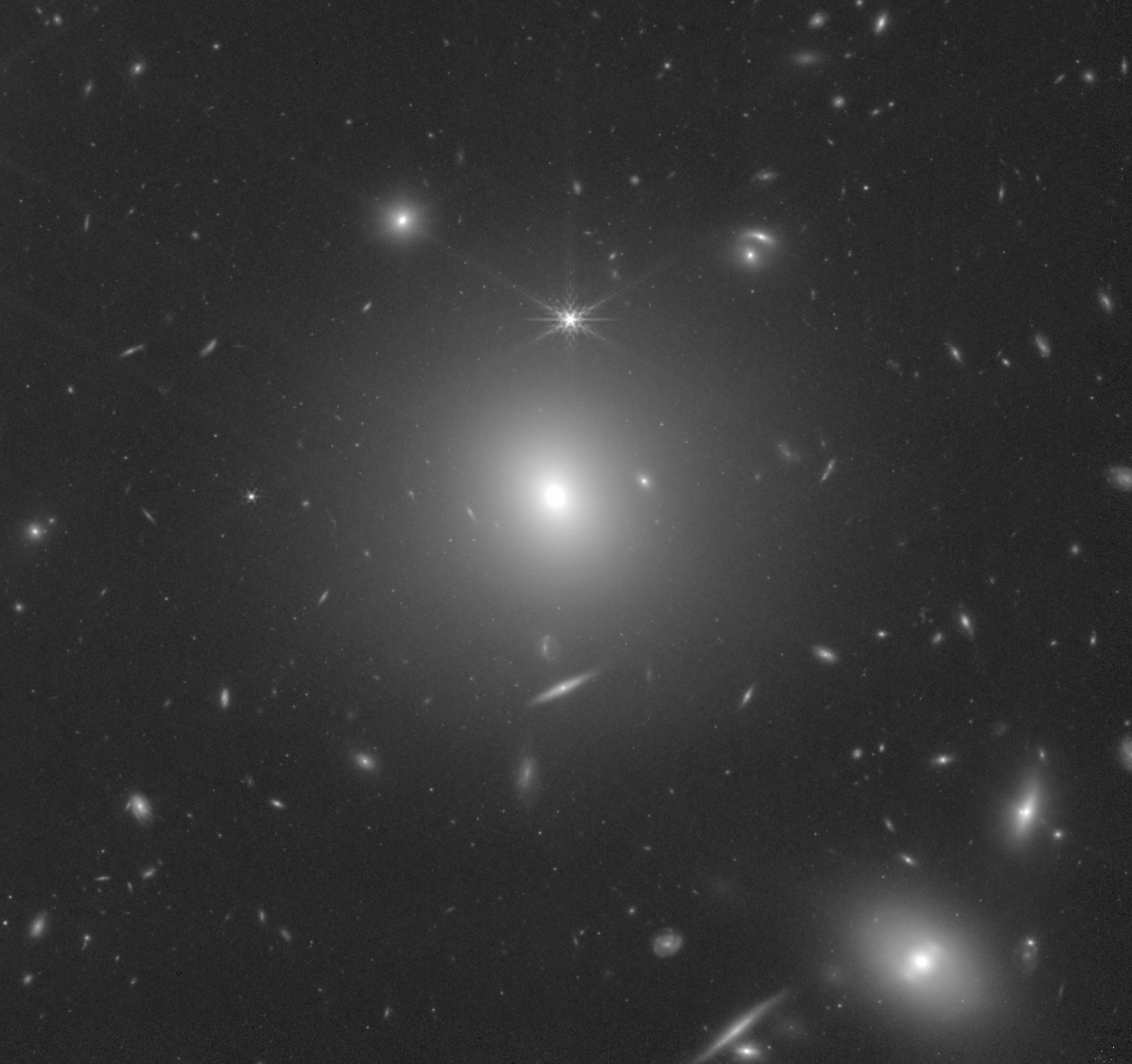
- The elliptical galaxy NGC 4869, taken by the James Webb Space Telescope.

Observation data (J2000 epoch)
- Constellation: Coma Berenices
- Right ascension: 12^{h} 59^{m} 23.36^{s}
- Declination: 27° 54′ 41.78″
- Redshift: 0.022820
- Heliocentric radial velocity: 6,841 km/s
- Distance: 343 Mly (105.16 Mpc)
- Group or cluster: Coma Cluster
- Apparent magnitude (V): 13.52
- Apparent magnitude (B): 14.9

Characteristics
- Type: E3, PAS
- Size: 37.62 kiloparsecs (122,700 light-years) (diameter; 2MASS K-band total isophote)
- Notable features: Radio galaxy

Other designations
- MCG +05-31-065, CGCG 160-225, PGC 44587, B2 1256+58, 5C 04.081, TXS 1257+281, 7C 1256+2810, KUG 1256+375, ABELL 1656:[D80] 105

NGC 4869 is an elliptical galaxy located in the constellation of Coma Berenices. It is located 343 million light years from Earth. The galaxy was discovered by William Herschel in April 1785 but also observed by both John Herschel and Heinrich d'Arrest, in March 1827 and May 1863 respectively. It is a member of the Coma Cluster with a small companion galaxy at a position angle of 325°.

== Characteristics ==
NGC 4869 is classified as a radio galaxy with a faint radio core with two oppositely directed radio jets and a lengthy low-surface brightness tail. It has an estimated γ-ray luminosity of Lγ ≤ 4 × 10^{39} erg s^{−1} like NGC 4874. There is also an elongated absorption feature in the galaxy, possibly representing an edge on disk.

NGC 4869 contains a narrow angle tailed radio source. The source is found lying towards the central region of the Coma Cluster by 111 kpc. It shows a mean fractional polarization of 18% at 4.535 GHz and 21% at 8.465 GHz and a large-scale structure that is almost 200 kpc. A characteristic feature of the source, is a sharp bend towards a north direction at 3’5 from the host galaxy's position.

According to a Chandra X-ray image of NGC 4869, a straight collimated jet is seen flaring when traversing a surface brightness edge.

== Supermassive black hole ==
The supermassive black hole in NGC 4869 is estimated to be 1.32 × 10^{8} M_{☉} (10^{8.12} M_{☉}) based on a study made by Jong-Hak Woo and Urry in 2002.
