= NGC 4919 =

Galaxy in the constellation Coma Berenices

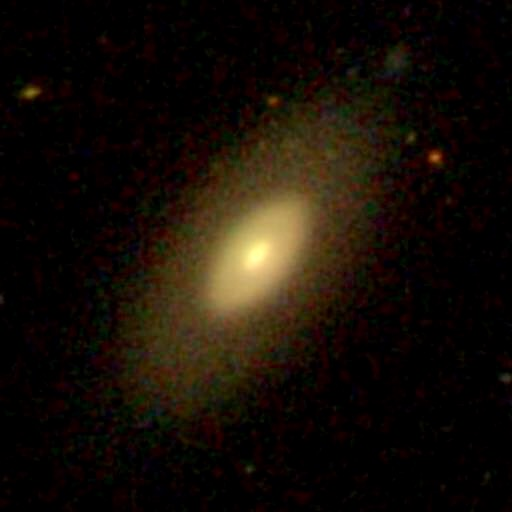
- Sloan Digital Sky Survey image of NGC 4919

Observation data (J2000 epoch)
- Constellation: Coma Berenices
- Right ascension: 13^{h} 01^{m} 17.6^{s}
- Declination: 27° 48′ 33″
- Redshift: 0.024464/7334 km/s
- Distance: 339,000,000 ly
- Group or cluster: Coma Cluster
- Apparent magnitude (V): 14.6

Characteristics
- Type: (R')SA(r)0^0
- Size: ~100,180 ly (estimated)
- Apparent size (V): 1.1 × 0.7

Other designations
- CGCG 160-94, DRCG 27-79, MCG 5-31-97, PGC 44885, UGC 8133

NGC 4919 is a lenticular galaxy located about 340 million light-years away in the constellation of Coma Berenices. NGC 4919 was discovered by astronomer Heinrich d'Arrest on May 5, 1864. NGC 4919 is a member of the Coma Cluster.

== Other images ==
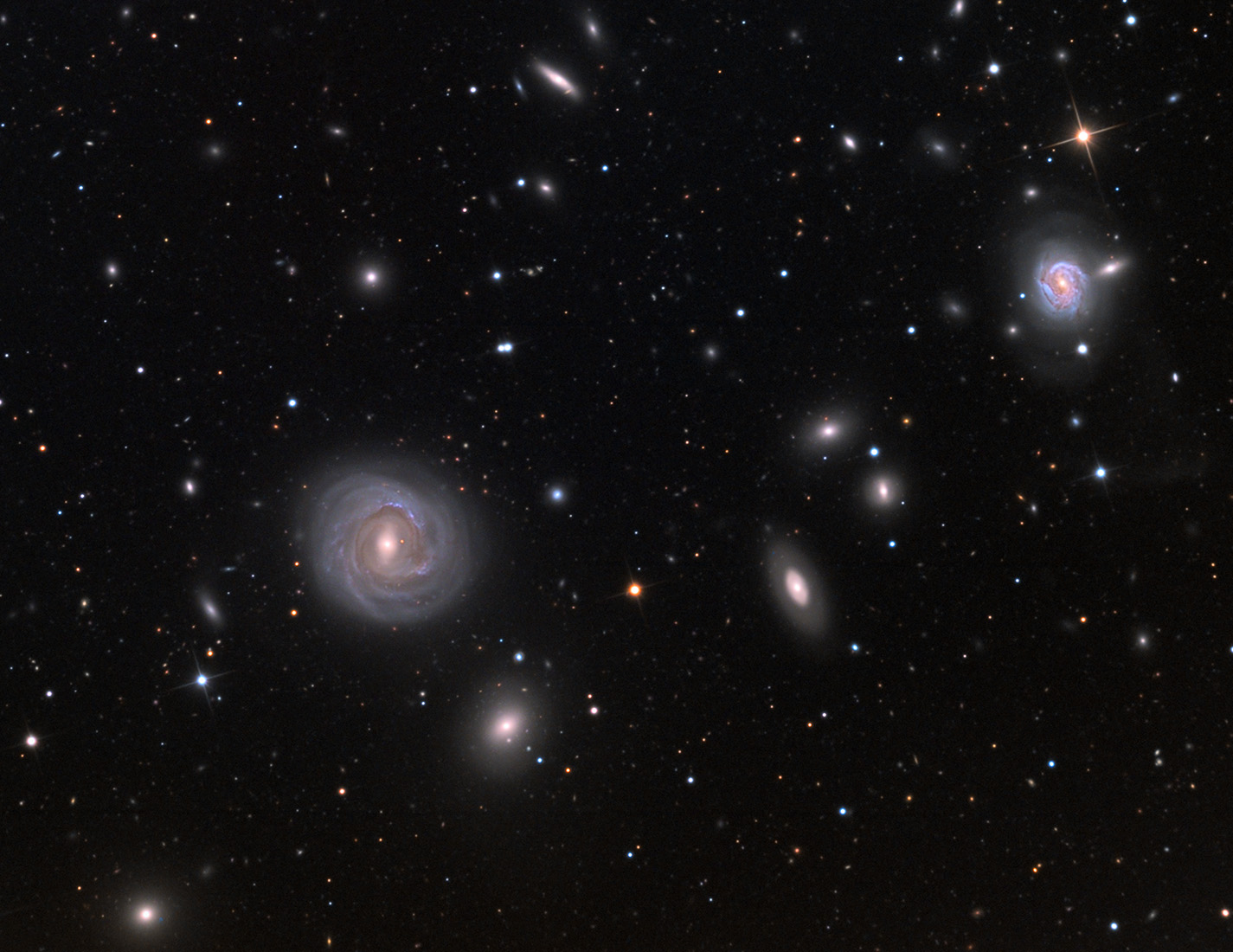
Image of the galaxies NGC 4911, NGC 4919, NGC 4921, and NGC 4923

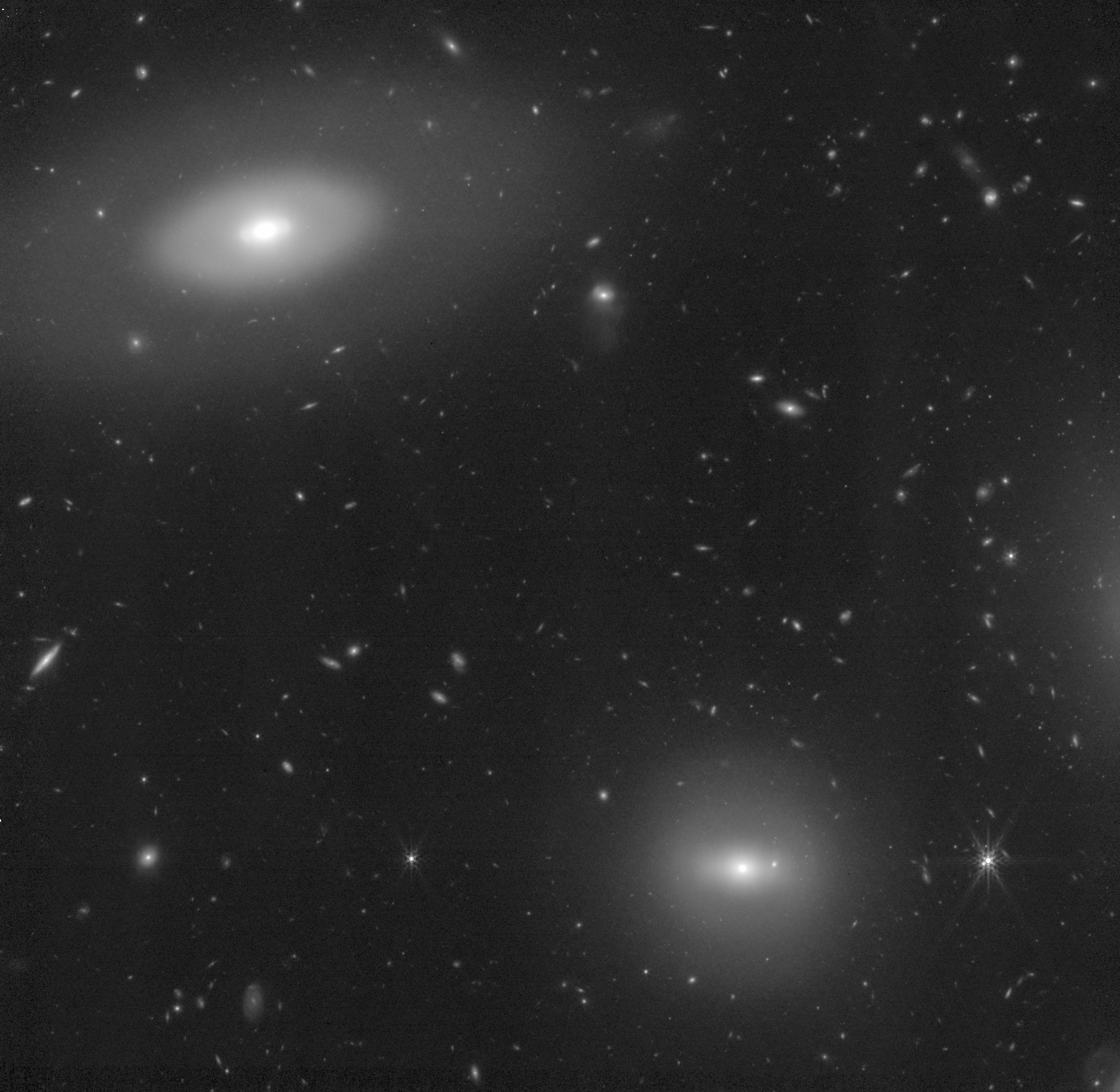
NGC 4919 (upper left) with James Webb Space Telescope NIRCam.

== See also ==
- List of NGC objects (4001–5000)
- NGC 7020
