= NGC 4886 =

Galaxy in the constellation Coma Berenices

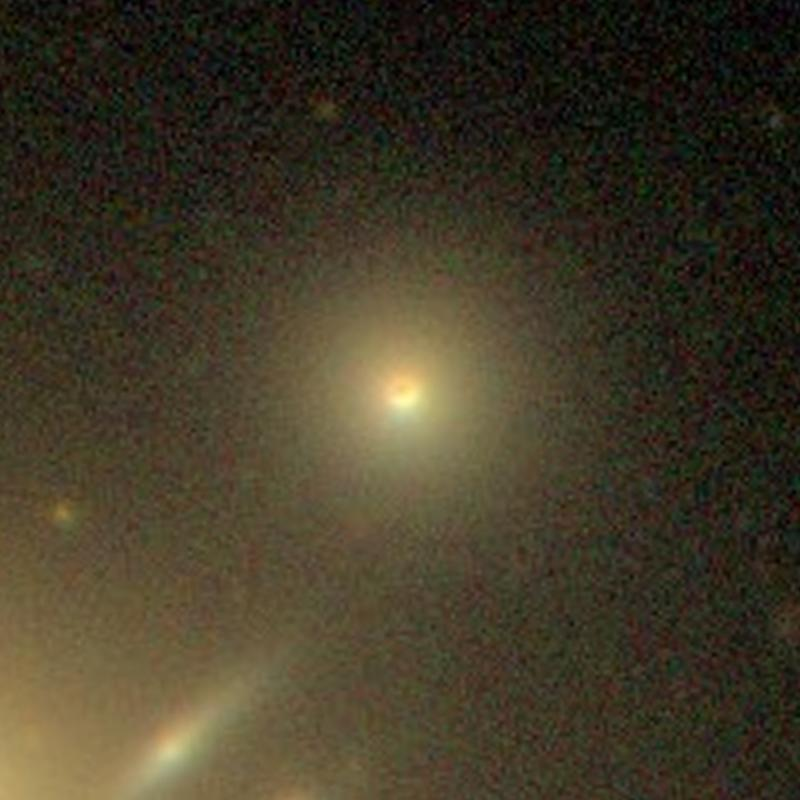
- SDSS image of NGC 4886.

Observation data (J2000 epoch)
- Constellation: Coma Berenices
- Right ascension: 13^{h} 00^{m} 04.4^{s}
- Declination: 27° 59′ 15″
- Redshift: 0.021321
- Heliocentric radial velocity: 6392 km/s
- Distance: 327 Mly (100.3 Mpc)
- Group or cluster: Coma Cluster
- Apparent magnitude (V): 14.9

Characteristics
- Type: E0
- Size: ~100,000 ly (32 kpc) (estimated)
- Apparent size (V): 1.1 x 1.1

Other designations
- DRCG 27-151, NGC 4882, MCG +5-31-76, PGC 44698, CGCG 160-239

NGC 4886 is an elliptical galaxy located about 327 million light-years away in the constellation Coma Berenices. NGC 4886 was discovered by astronomer Heinrich d'Arrest on April 6, 1864. It was then rediscovered by d'Arrest on April 22, 1865, and was listed as NGC 4882. NGC 4886 is a member of the Coma Cluster.

== See also ==
- List of NGC objects (4001–5000)
- NGC 4889
