= NGC 4892 =

Galaxy in the constellation Coma Berenices

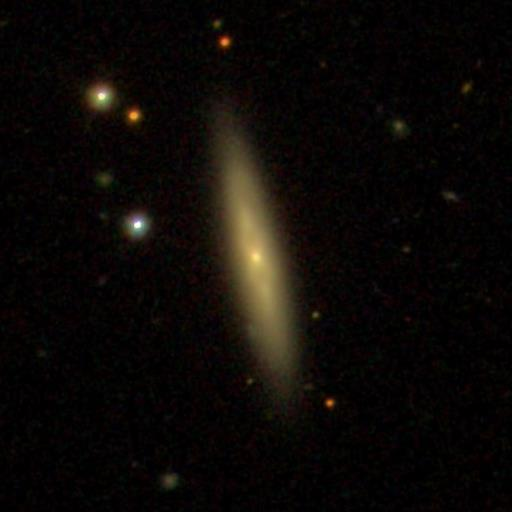
- SDSS image of NGC 4892.

Observation data (J2000 epoch)
- Constellation: Coma Berenices
- Right ascension: 13^{h} 00^{m} 03.5^{s}
- Declination: 26° 53′ 53″
- Redshift: 0.019690
- Heliocentric radial velocity: 5903 km/s
- Distance: 275 Mly (84.2 Mpc)
- Group or cluster: Coma Cluster
- Apparent magnitude (V): 14.2

Characteristics
- Type: Sb, S0-a
- Size: ~180,000 ly (56 kpc) (estimated)
- Apparent size (V): 1.57 x 0.38

Other designations
- CGCG 160-81, MCG 5-31-78, PGC 44697, UGC 8108

NGC 4892 is a spiral or lenticular galaxy with LINER activity located 275 million light-years away in the constellation Coma Berenices. It was discovered by the astronomer William Herschel on April 11, 1785, and is a member of the Coma Cluster.

== See also ==
- List of NGC objects (4001–5000)
