= NGC 4881 =

Galaxy in the constellation Coma Berenices

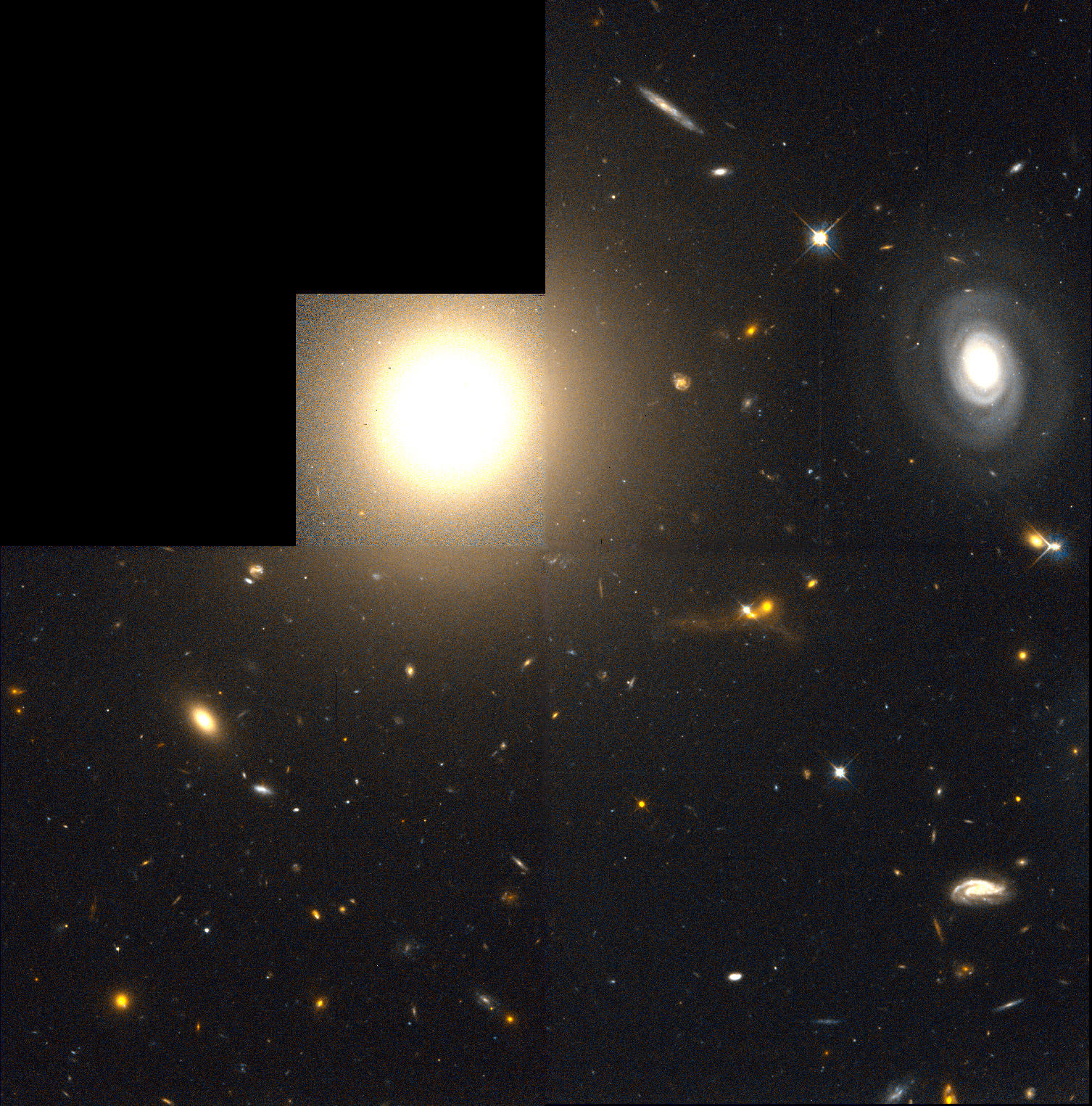
- Elliptical Galaxy NGC 4881 (center) and the Spiral galaxy PGC 44691 (right).

Observation data (J2000 epoch)
- Constellation: Coma Berenices
- Right ascension: 12^{h} 59^{m} 57.74810^{s}
- Declination: +28° 14′ 48.0093″
- Heliocentric radial velocity: 6740±6 km/s
- Galactocentric velocity: 6755±6 km/s
- Distance: 308.61 ± 0.72 Mly (94.62 ± 0.22 Mpc)
- Apparent magnitude (V): 14.6

Characteristics
- Type: E0
- Apparent size (V): 1′.0 × 1′.0

Other designations
- NGC 4481, UGC 8106, LEDA 44686, PGC 44686

NGC 4881 is an elliptical galaxy in the northern constellation of Coma Berenices. It was discovered by the German astronomer Heinrich Louis d'Arrest on April 22, 1865. John L. E. Dreyer described it as "faint, small, a little extended, 9th magnitude star to southwest". This object is located at a distance of approximately 309 megalight-years from the Milky Way. It is a member of the Coma cluster of galaxies, positioned around 18′ to the north of the cluster's center with no nearby galactic neighbors.

The morphological class of thisgalaxy is E0, indicating it is an elliptical galaxy with a spherically symmetric form. It does not display any unusual or peculiar features. A total of 88 globular cluster candidates have been identified orbiting this galaxy, which yields an estimated total of 195±21. It has an unusually low frequency of globulars for a galaxy of this type.

== See also ==
- Mice Galaxies
- Virgo A
