= NGC 4873 =

Galaxy in the constellation Coma Berenices

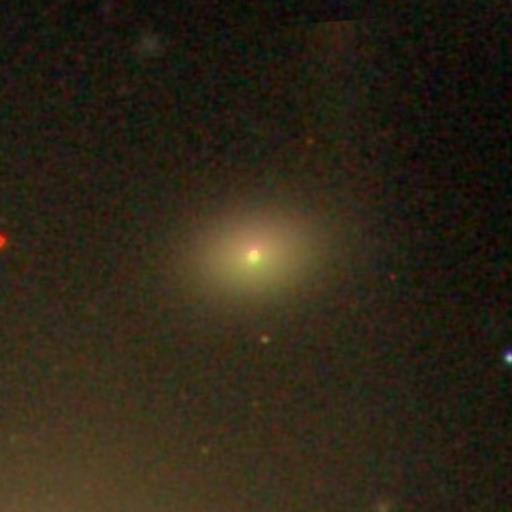
- SDSS image of NGC 4873.

Observation data (J2000 epoch)
- Constellation: Coma Berenices
- Right ascension: 12^{h} 59^{m} 32.8^{s}
- Declination: 27° 59′ 01″
- Redshift: 0.019310/5789 km/s
- Distance: 269,276,000 ly
- Group or cluster: Coma Cluster
- Apparent magnitude (V): 15.1

Characteristics
- Type: SA0
- Size: ~79,000 ly (estimated)
- Apparent size (V): 0.67 x 0.45

Other designations
- CGCG 160-229, DRCG 27-155, MCG 5-31-69, PGC 44621

NGC 4873 is a lenticular galaxy located about 270 million light-years away in the constellation of Coma Berenices. NGC 4873 was discovered by astronomer Heinrich d'Arrest on May 10, 1863. The galaxy is a member of the Coma Cluster.

== Other images ==
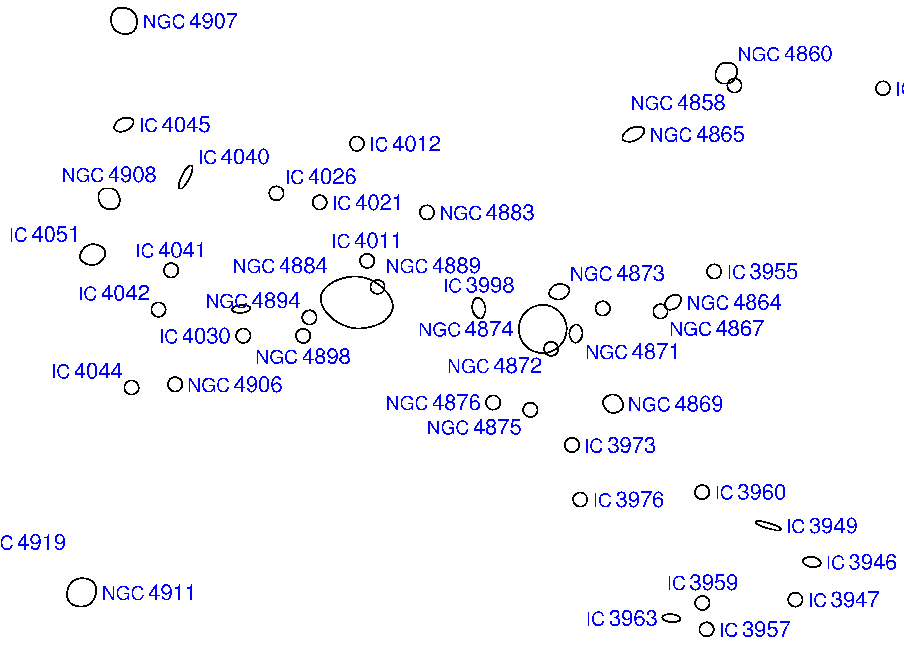
Map with labels of the galaxies in the central part of the Coma Cluster.

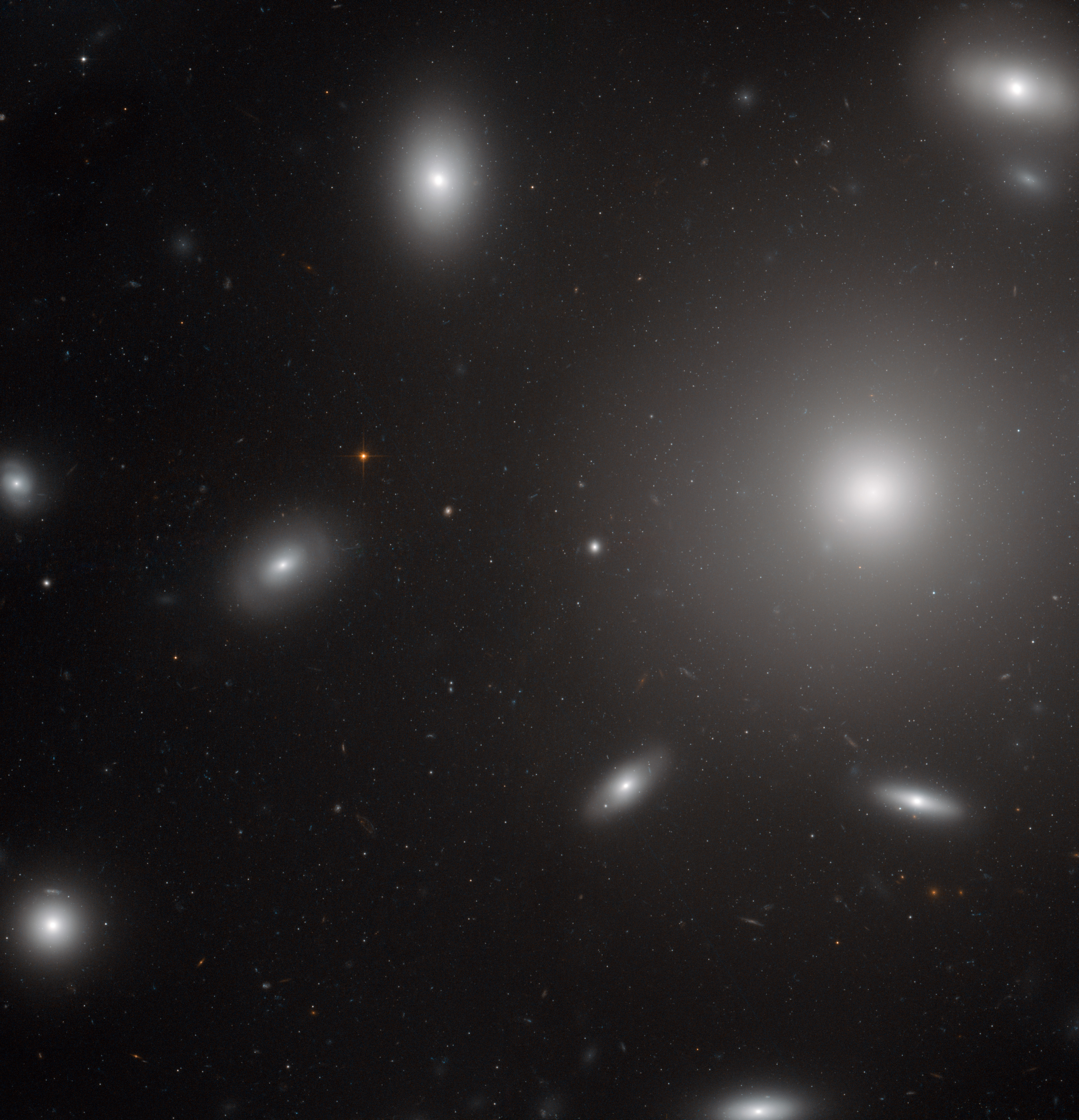
Hubble image of the giant galaxy NGC 4874. NGC 4873 is the small galaxy in upper-central portion of the image.

== See also ==
- List of NGC objects (4001–5000)
- NGC 4889
