= PGC 44691 =

Spiral galaxy in constellation Coma Berenices

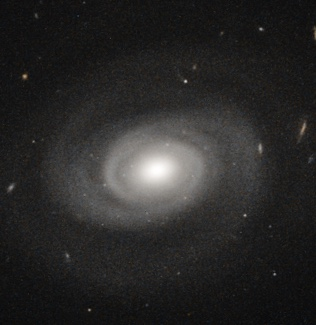
- The spiral galaxy PGC 44691.

Observation data (J2000 epoch)
- Constellation: Coma Berenices
- Right ascension: 13^{h} 00^{m} 03.0^{s}
- Declination: 28° 14′ 25″
- Redshift: 0.025631/7684 km/s
- Distance: 352,080,000 ly
- Group or cluster: Coma Cluster
- Apparent magnitude (V): 16.7

Characteristics
- Type: Sa
- Size: ~50,560 ly (estimated)
- Apparent size (V): 0.43 x 0.32

Other designations
- 2MASX J13000297+2814253

PGC 44691 is a spiral galaxy located about 350 million light-years away in the constellation Coma Berenices. It belongs to a galaxy cluster known as the Coma Cluster. In 1994, the Hubble Space Telescope observed PGC 44691 and the nearby elliptical galaxy NGC 4881 to infer the distance to the Coma Cluster.

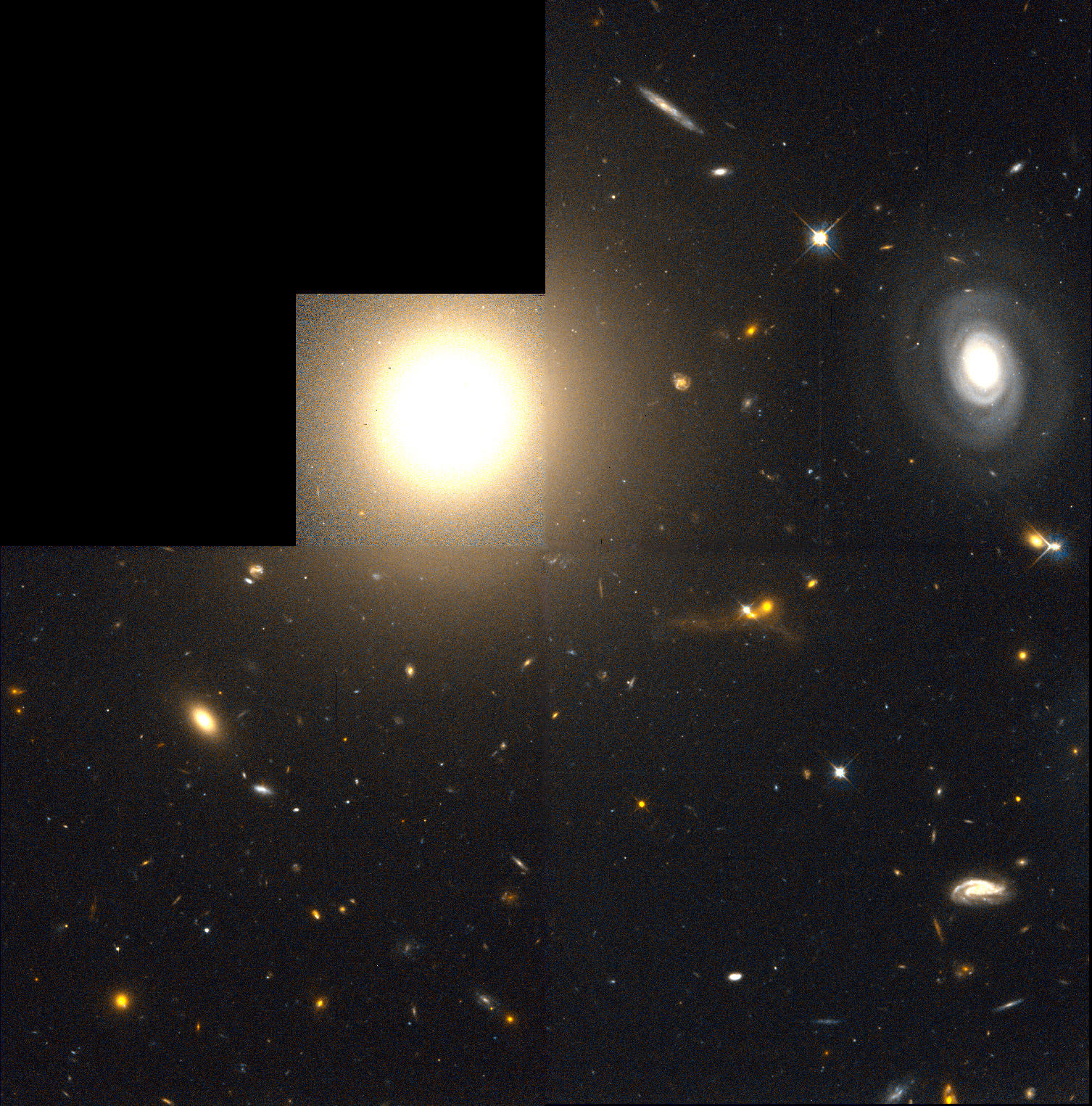
Hubble image of the galaxies NGC 4881 (center) and PGC 44691 (right).

== See also ==
- NGC 4921 Another spiral galaxy in the Coma Cluster
