= NGC 3891 =

Galaxy in the constellation Ursa Major

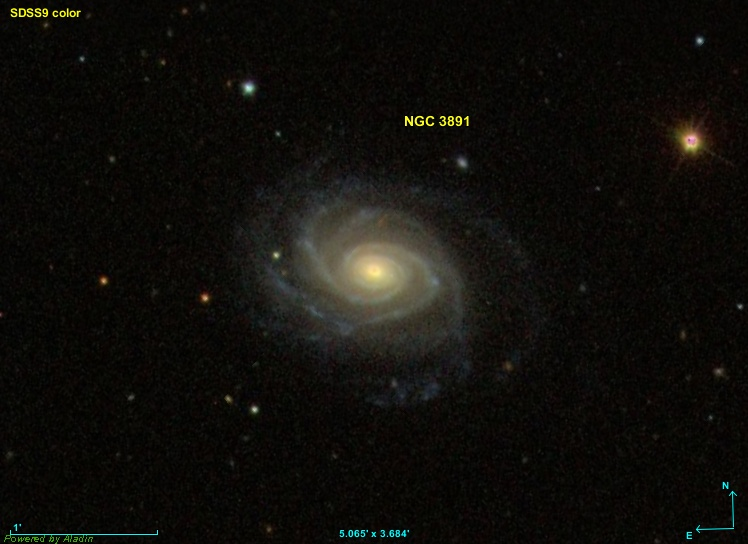
- NGC 3891 imaged by SDSS

Observation data (J2000 epoch)
- Constellation: Ursa Major
- Right ascension: 11^{h} 48^{m} 03.3648^{s}
- Declination: +30° 21′ 33.621″
- Redshift: 0.020980±0.00000661
- Heliocentric radial velocity: 6,290±2 km/s
- Distance: 330.46 ± 14.72 Mly (101.320 ± 4.514 Mpc)
- Group or cluster: Coma Cluster
- Apparent magnitude (V): 13.3g

Characteristics
- Type: Sbc
- Size: ~221,100 ly (67.79 kpc) (estimated)
- Apparent size (V): 1.54′ × 1.15′

Other designations
- 2MASX J11480336+3021335, UGC 6772, MCG +05-28-031, PGC 36832, CGCG 157-035

NGC 3891 is a large spiral galaxy in the constellation of Ursa Major. Its velocity with respect to the cosmic microwave background is 6,581±20 km/s, which corresponds to a Hubble distance of 316.6 ± 22.2 Mly (97.06 ± 6.80 Mpc). However, 10 non-redshift measurements give a slightly farther mean distance of 330.46 ± 14.72 Mly (101.320 ± 4.514 Mpc). It was discovered by German-British astronomer William Herschel on 3 February 1788.

NGC 3891 is a LINER galaxy, i.e. a galaxy whose nucleus has an emission spectrum characterized by broad lines of weakly ionized atoms. It is also a radio galaxy, i.e. it has giant regions of radio emission extending well beyond its visible structure.

NGC 3891 is a member of the Coma cluster.

== Supernovae ==
Two supernovae have been observed in NGC 3891:

- SN 2006or (Type Ia, mag. 16.3) was discovered by Tim Puckett and A. Kroes on 18 November 2006.
- SN 2018bdv (Type II-P, mag. 18.53) was discovered by Gaia Photometric Science Alerts on 29 April 2018.

== See also ==
- List of NGC objects (3001–4000)
