= RB 199 =

Galaxy

RB 199, also known as LEDA 126817 or GMP 4060, is an E+A galaxy in the Coma Cluster.

RB199 contains filamentary structures of hot gas known as "ram pressure fireballs". These fireballs are actively forming stars. After forming, the stars are no longer subjected to a ram pressure force, causing them to be left behind in a tail as the gas structure is accelerated.
