= NGC 4848 =

Galaxy in the constellation Coma Berenices

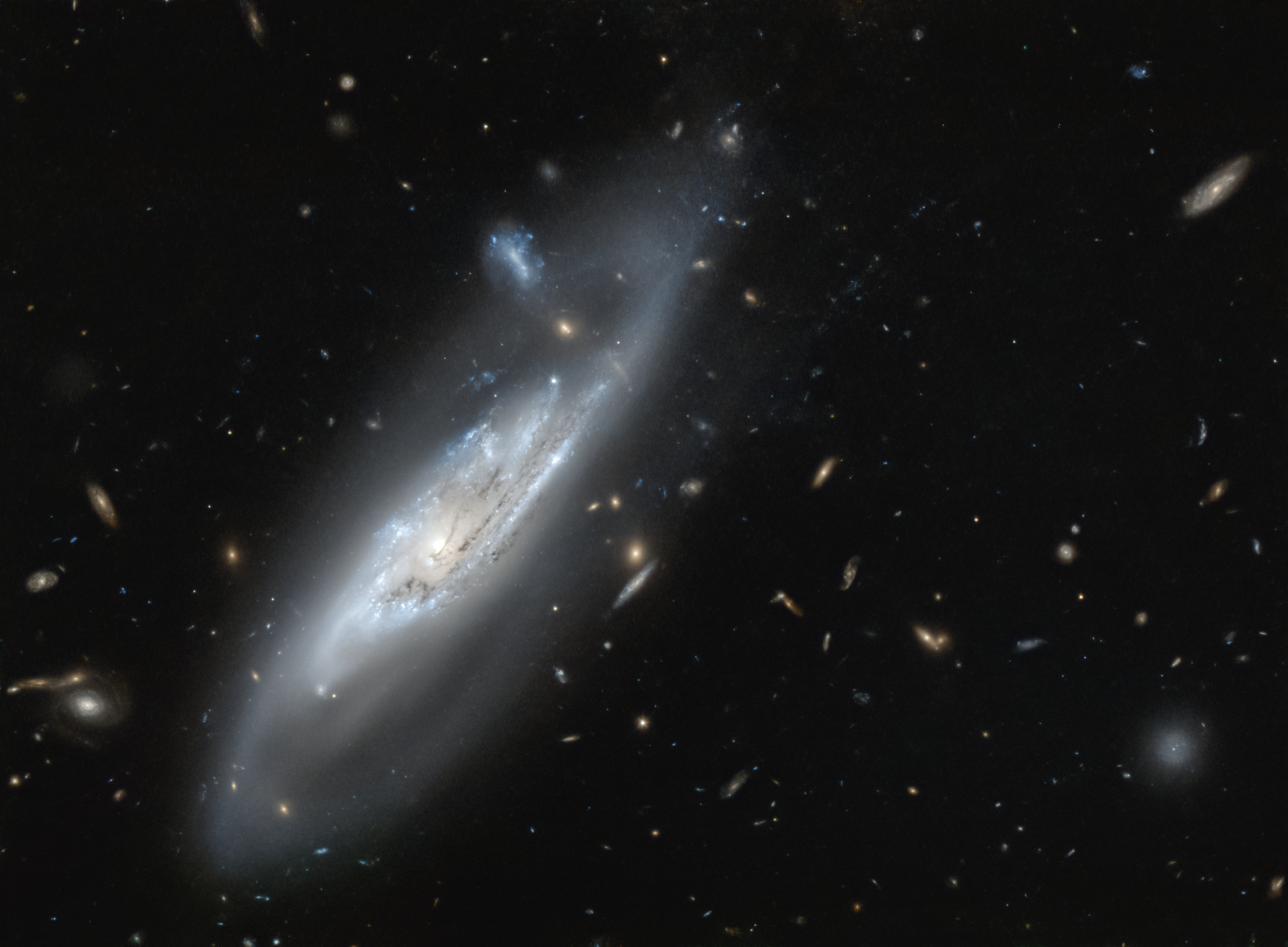
- NGC 4848 imaged by the Hubble Space Telescope

Observation data (J2000 epoch)
- Constellation: Coma Berenices
- Right ascension: 12^{h} 58^{m} 05.6^{s}
- Declination: +28° 14′ 34″
- Redshift: 0.023513 ± 0.000033
- Heliocentric radial velocity: 7,049 ± 10 km/s
- Distance: 340 ± 15 Mly (104 ± 4.5 Mpc)
- Group or cluster: Coma Cluster
- Apparent magnitude (V): 13.7

Characteristics
- Type: SBab: sp
- Apparent size (V): 1.6′ × 0.5′
- Notable features: Hydrogen tail

Other designations
- UGC 8082, MCG +05-31-039, CGCG 160-055, PGC 44405, 5C 04.058

NGC 4848 is a barred spiral galaxy in the constellation Coma Berenices. It is about 340 million light-years from Earth, which, given its apparent dimensions, means that NGC 4848 is about 170,000 light years across. It was discovered by Heinrich d'Arrest on April 21, 1865. It is considered part of the Coma Cluster, which is in its northwest part. The galaxy has been stripped of its gas as it passed through the cluster.

== Characteristics ==
NGC 4848 is a spiral galaxy viewed nearly edge-on that is classified as SBab by de Vaucouleurs. Its nucleus is active, and it has been categorised as an HII region. A number of bright HII regions form a ring around the nucleus with a radius of 5–10 arcseconds. The star formation rate is estimated to be 9 M_{☉} per year based on the H-alpha, ultraviolet, infrared and radio luminosity.

The galaxy distribution of hydrogen gas is asymmetrical and forms a tail pointing away from the cluster center. The tail has projected dimensions of 62.5 by 18.5 kpc and an estimated hydrogen mass of 4×10^{9} M_{☉}. The tail was probably formed as a result of ram pressure as the galaxy passed through the Coma Cluster and its intergalactic medium at a speed of about 1,330 km/s, starting 200 million years ago according to Fossati et al., while a previous study indicated a timeline of 400 million years. The lost hydrogen is estimated to comprise two thirds of the original hydrogen content of the galaxy. A few star-forming regions, probably HII regions, are in the tail.

A dwarf galaxy may cross the disk of NGC 4848; however, its mass is too low to be a source of the hydrogen tail.

== See also ==
- NGC 4921, a spiral galaxy in the Coma Cluster that has lost its hydrogen
