= NGC 4839 =

Galaxy in the constellation Coma Berenices

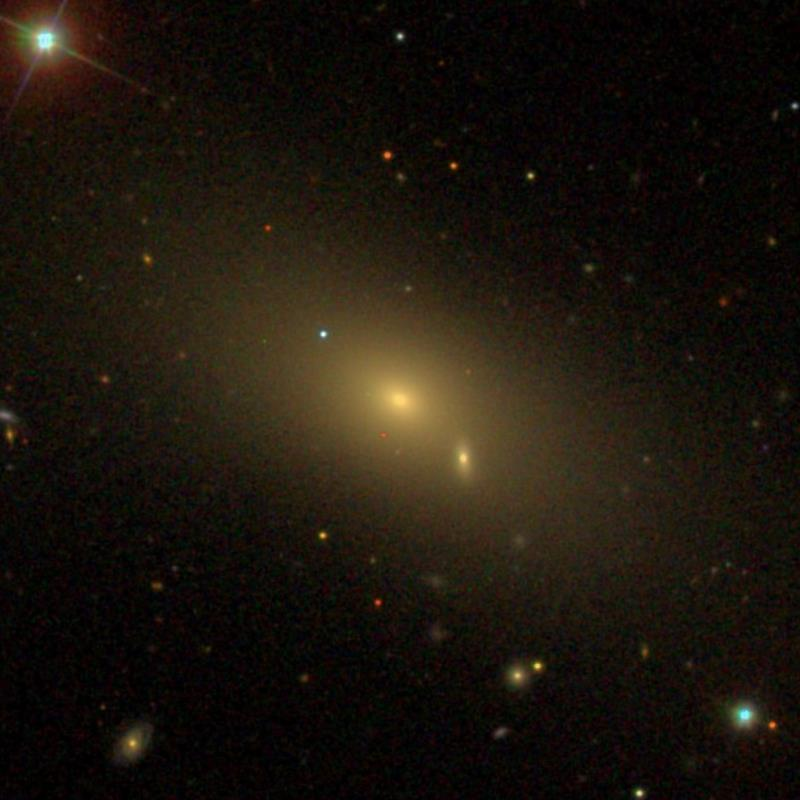
- The cD galaxy NGC 4839.

Observation data (J2000 epoch)
- Constellation: Coma Berenices
- Right ascension: 12^{h} 57^{m} 24.361^{s}
- Declination: +27° 29′ 52.14″
- Redshift: 0.02448
- Heliocentric radial velocity: 7913 km/s
- Distance: 380.7 Mly (116.71 Mpc)
- Apparent magnitude (B): 13.02

Characteristics
- Type: cD; SA0
- Size: 350,000 ly (107.36 kpc) (estimated)

Other designations
- 2MASX J12572435+2729517, UGC 8070, MCG -05-31-025, PGC 44298, CGCG 160-039

NGC 4839 is a lenticular type-cD galaxy located within the rich Coma Cluster of galaxies. The galaxy is part of the NGC 4839 galaxy group of which it is the brightest galaxy.

The NGC 4839 group appears to be merging with the Coma cluster. However it is unclear if the group is on its initial infall or if it has passed through the cluster once already. A 2023 paper argued that the distribution of globular clusters within the galaxy supported the galaxy being on its second infall.

NGC 4839 was discovered on April 11, 1785, by William Herschel, but also observed by John Herschel on April 19, 1827, and by Heinrich d'Arrest on May 18, 1862. It is classified as a radio galaxy presenting radio waves.
