= NGC 4895 =

Galaxy in the constellation Coma Berenices

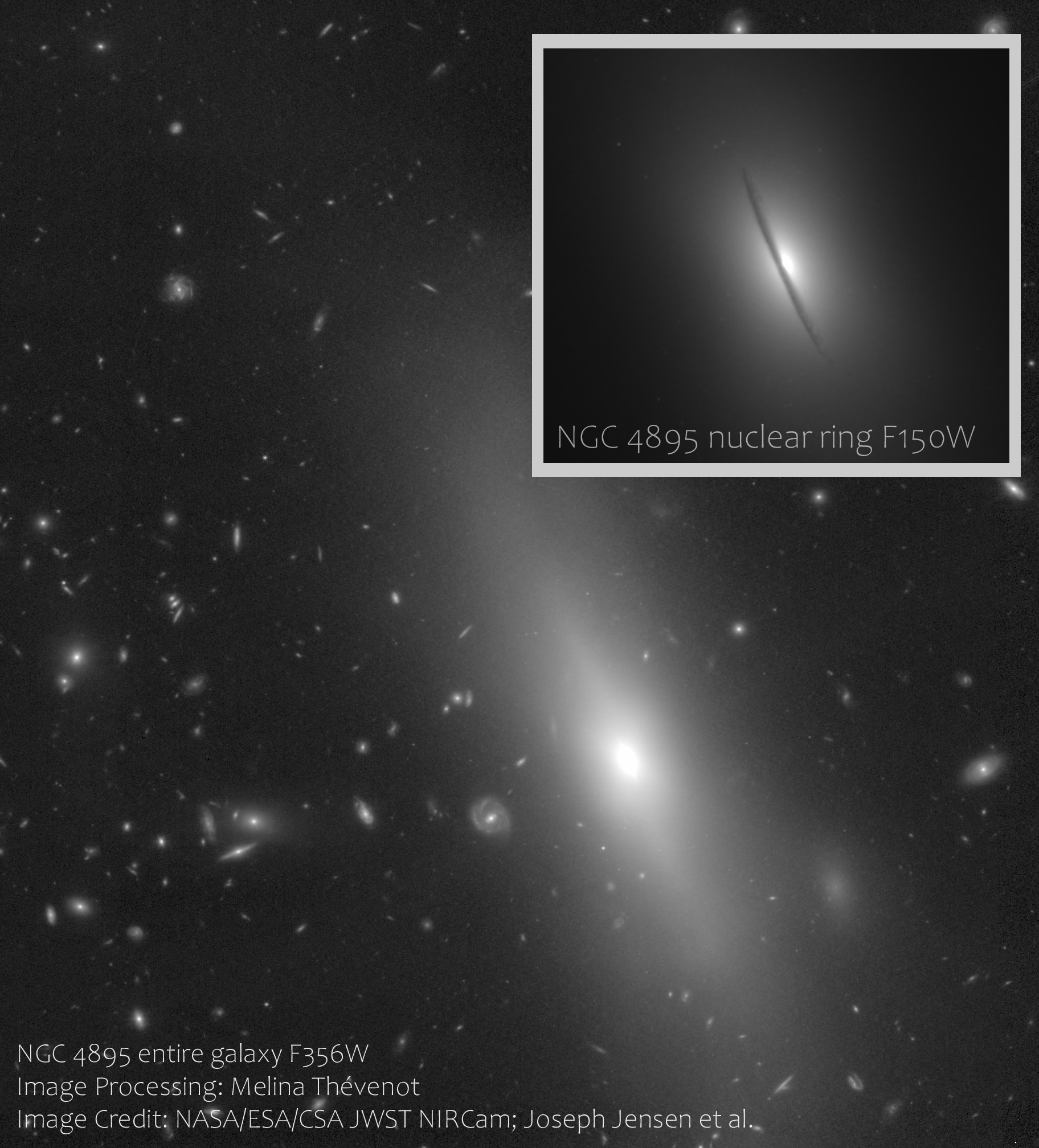
- James Webb Space Telescope image of NGC 4895. Upper right shows the center of the galaxy zoomed-in, revealing the nuclear ring of the galaxy.

Observation data (J2000 epoch)
- Constellation: Coma Berenices
- Right ascension: 13^{h} 00^{m} 17.9^{s}
- Declination: 28° 12′ 08″
- Redshift: 0.028326
- Heliocentric radial velocity: 8492 km/s
- Distance: 330 Mly (100 Mpc)
- Group or cluster: Coma Cluster
- Apparent magnitude (V): 14.0

Characteristics
- Type: SA0 pec
- Size: ~195,000 ly (59.22 kpc) (estimated)
- Apparent size (V): 1.8 x 0.6

Other designations
- NGC 4896, CGCG 160-249, MCG 5-31-81, PGC 44737, UGC 8113

NGC 4895 is a lenticular galaxy located 330 million light-years away in the constellation Coma Berenices. The galaxy was discovered by astronomer Heinrich d'Arrest on May 5, 1864 and is a member of the Coma Cluster.

== NGC identification ==
According to Harold Corwin, NGC 4895 is equal to NGC 4896. The NGC designation is usually given to CGCG 160-087 which is a member of the Coma Cluster.

== See also ==
- List of NGC objects (4001–5000)
