= NGC 4911 =

Galaxy in the constellation Coma Berenices

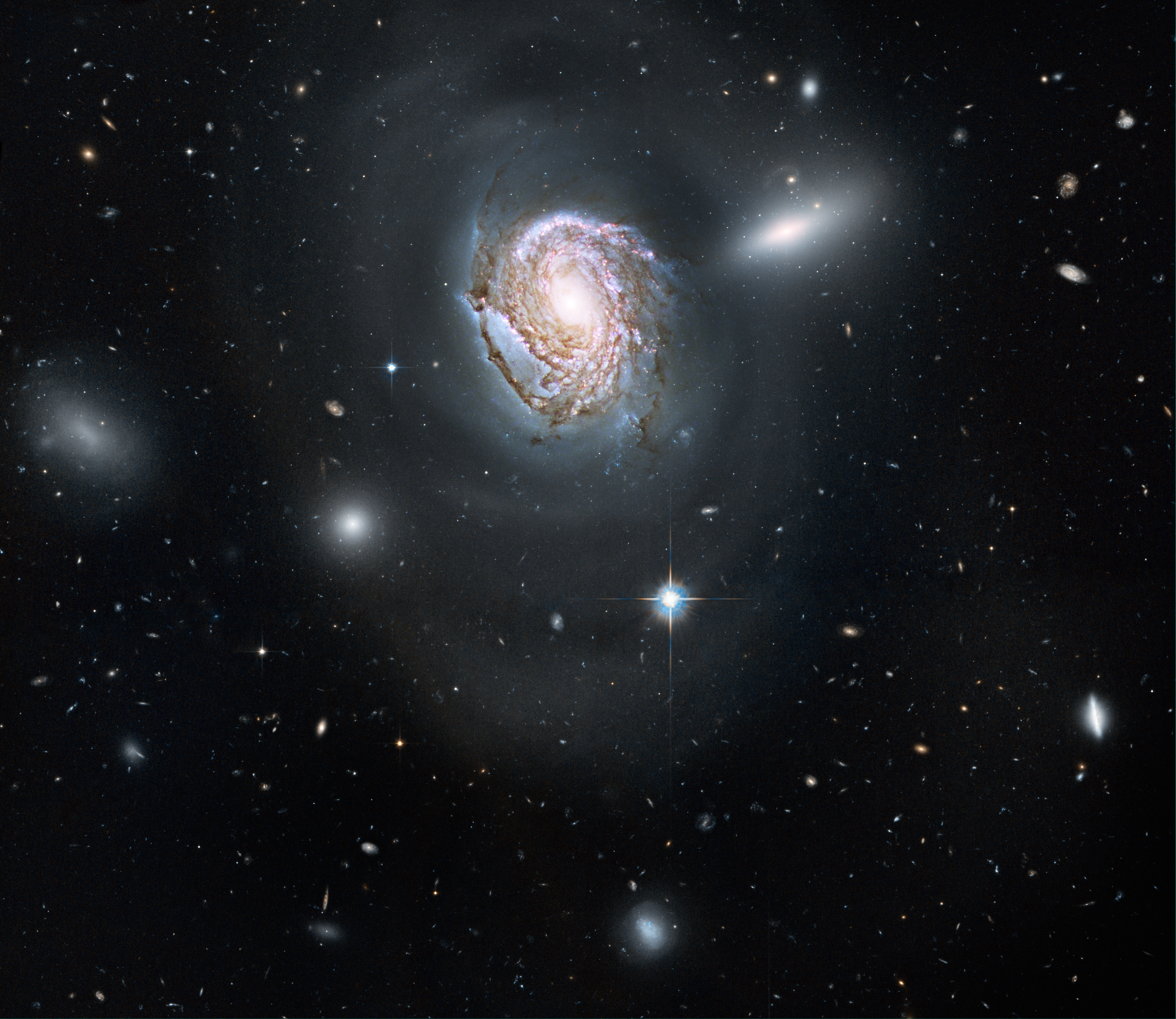
- HST image of NGC 4911

Observation data (J2000 epoch)
- Constellation: Coma Berenices
- Right ascension: 13^{h} 00^{m} 56.06160^{s}
- Declination: +27° 47′ 27.1512″
- Redshift: 0.02659
- Heliocentric radial velocity: 7866 km/s
- Distance: 378.4 Mly (116.02 Mpc)
- Apparent magnitude (V): 13.7
- Apparent magnitude (B): 13.33

Characteristics
- Type: SAB(r)bc
- Size: 212,300 ly (65.12 kpc) (estimated)
- Apparent size (V): 1.3′
- Notable features: Dreyer's description: 1st of 4, F, pL, *11 2' np

Other designations
- UGC 8128, MCG +05-31-093, PGC 44840

NGC 4911 is a disturbed, warped spiral galaxy with a bright prominent central starburst ring and located deep within the Coma Cluster of galaxies, which lies some 300 million light years away in the northern constellation Coma Berenices. NGC 4911 is believed to be interacting with its warped, barred lenticular companion (or any of its many other nearby companions), producing the enhanced star formation and shell-like appearance seen in optical images. The galaxy contains rich lanes of dust and gas near its centre. The existence of clouds of hydrogen within the galaxy indicates ongoing star formation. It is rare for a spiral galaxy to be situated at the heart of a cluster.
