= NGC 4889 =

Galaxy in the constellation Coma Berenices

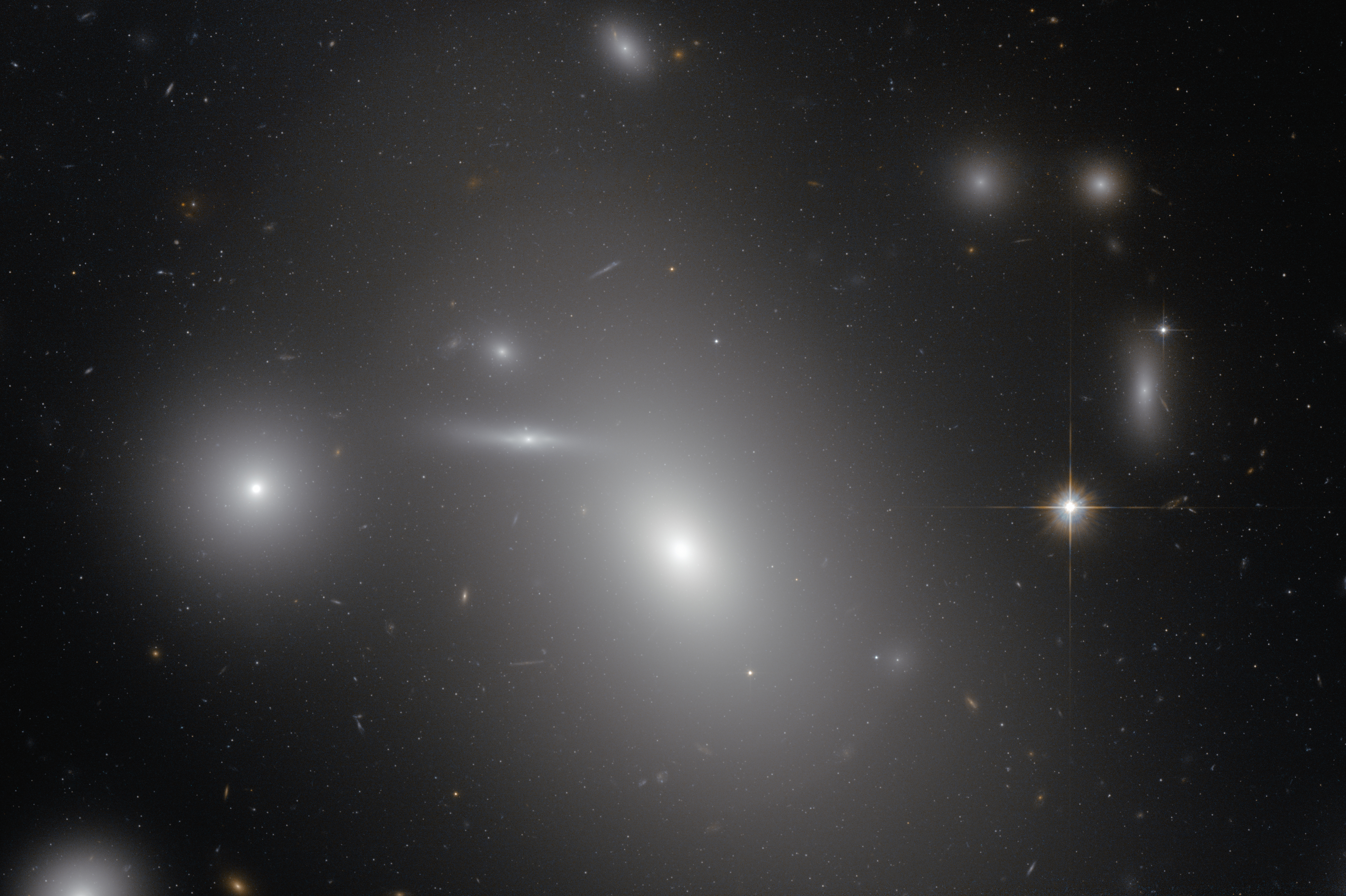
- The elliptical galaxy NGC 4889; Credit: Hubble Space Telescope

Observation data (J2000.0 epoch)
- Constellation: Coma Berenices
- Right ascension: 13^{h} 00^{m} 08.1^{s}
- Declination: +27° 58′ 37″
- Redshift: 0.021502±0.000010
- Heliocentric radial velocity: 6,495±13 km/s
- Galactocentric velocity: 6,509±13 km/s
- Group or cluster: Coma Cluster
- Apparent magnitude (V): 12.9

Characteristics
- Type: cD; E4; Dd
- Size: 86.976 to 90.9 kpc (283,680 to 296,480 ly) (diameter; D_{25.0} B-band and 2MASS K-band total isophotes)
- Apparent size (V): 2.9′ × 1.9′

Other designations
- ZWG 160.241, DRCG 27-148, Caldwell 35, NGC 4884, UGC 8110, MCG +5-31-77, PGC 44715
- References: SIMBAD: data

NGC 4889 (also known as Caldwell 35) is an E4 supergiant elliptical galaxy. It was discovered in 1785 by the British astronomer Frederick William Herschel I, who catalogued it as a bright, nebulous patch. The brightest galaxy within the northern Coma Cluster, it is located at a median distance of 94 million parsecs (308 million light years) from Earth. At the core of the galaxy is a supermassive black hole that heats the intracluster medium through the action of friction from infalling gases and dust. The gamma ray bursts from the galaxy extend out to several million light-years from the cluster.

As with other similar elliptical galaxies, only a fraction of the mass of NGC 4889 is in the form of stars. They have a flattened, unequal distribution that bulges within its edge. Between the stars is a dense interstellar medium full of heavy elements emitted by evolved stars. The diffuse stellar halo extends out to one million light-years in diameter. Orbiting the galaxy is a very large population of globular clusters. NGC 4889 is also a strong source of soft X-ray, ultraviolet, and radio frequency radiation.

As the largest and most massive galaxy easily visible to Earth, NGC 4889 has played an important role in both amateur and professional astronomy, and has become a prototype in studying the dynamical evolution of other supergiant elliptical galaxies in the more distant universe.

== Observation ==
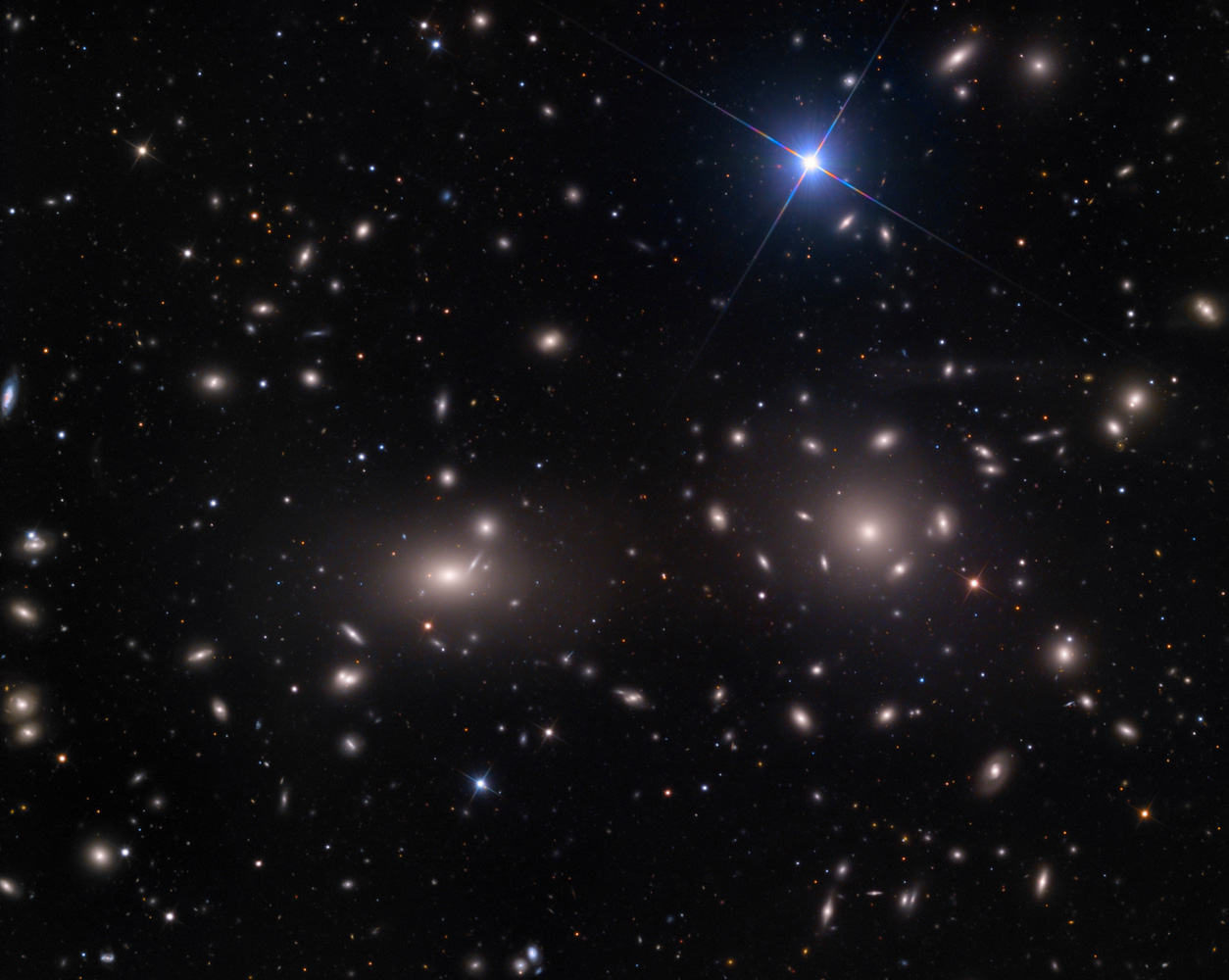
Wide-field image of the Coma Cluster. NGC 4889 is the bright galaxy to the left. The galaxy at the right is NGC 4874, while the star above it is HD 112887 which is a foreground star and is completely unrelated to the cluster.

NGC 4889 was not included by the astronomer Charles Messier in his famous Messier catalogue despite being an intrinsically bright object quite close to some Messier objects. The first known observation of NGC 4889 was that of Frederick William Herschel I, assisted by his sister, Caroline Lucretia Herschel, in 1785, who included it in the Catalogue of Nebulae and Clusters of Stars published a year later. In 1864, Herschel's son, John Frederick William Herschel, published the General Catalogue of Nebulae and Clusters of Stars. He included the objects catalogued by his father, including the one later to be called NGC 4889, plus others he found that were somehow missed by his father.

In 1888 the astronomer John Louis Emil Dreyer published the New General Catalogue of Nebulae and Clusters of Stars (NGC), with a total of 7,840 objects, but he erroneously duplicated the galaxy in two designations, NGC 4884 and NGC 4889. Within the following century, several projects aimed to revise the NGC catalogue, such as The NGC/IC Project, Revised New General Catalogue of Nebulae and Clusters of Stars, and the NGC 2000.0 projects, discovered the duplication. It was then decided that the object would be called by its latter designation, NGC 4889, which is in use today.

In December 1995, Patrick Caldwell Moore compiled the Caldwell catalogue, a list of 109 persistent, bright objects that were somehow missed by Messier in his catalogue. The list also includes NGC 4889, which is given the designation Caldwell 35.

== Properties ==
The location of NGC 4889 (circled) in Coma Berenices

NGC 4889 is located along the high declination region of Coma Berenices, south of the constellation Canes Venatici. It can be traced by following the line from Beta Comae Berenices to Gamma Comae Berenices. With an apparent magnitude of 11.4, it can be seen by telescopes with 12 inch aperture, but its visibility is greatly affected by light pollution due to glare of the light from Beta Comae Berenices. However, under very dark, moonless skies, it can be seen by small telescopes as a faint smudge, but larger telescopes are needed in order to see the galaxy's halo.

In the updated Hubble sequence galaxy morphological classification scheme by the French astronomer Gérard de Vaucouleurs in 1959, NGC 4889 is classified as an E4 type galaxy, which means it has a flat distribution of stars within its width. It is also classified as a cD galaxy, a giant type of D galaxy, a classification devised by the American astronomer William Wilson Morgan in 1958 for galaxies with an elliptical-shaped nucleus surrounded by an immense, diffuse, dustless, extended halo.

NGC 4889 is far enough that its distance can be measured using redshift. With the redshift of 0.0266 as derived from the Sloan Digital Sky Survey, and the Hubble constant as determined in 2013 by the ESA COBRAS/SAMBA/Planck Surveyor translates its distance of 94 Mpc (308 million light years) from Earth.

NGC 4889 is probably the largest and the most massive galaxy out to the radius of 100 Mpc (326 million light years) of the Milky Way. The galaxy has an effective radius which extends at 2.9 arcminutes of the sky, translating to a diameter of 239,000 light years, about 1.5 times the isophotal size of the Andromeda Galaxy. In addition it has an immense diffuse light halo extending to 17.8 arcminutes, roughly half the angular diameter of the Sun, translating to 1.3 million light years in diameter.

Along with its large size, NGC 4889 may also be extremely massive. If we take the Milky Way as the standard of mass, it may be close to 8 trillion solar masses. However, as NGC 4889 is a spheroid, and not a flat spiral, it has a three-dimensional profile, so it may be as high as 15 trillion solar masses. However, as usual for elliptical galaxies, only a small fraction of the mass of NGC 4889 is in the form of stars that radiate energy.

== Components ==
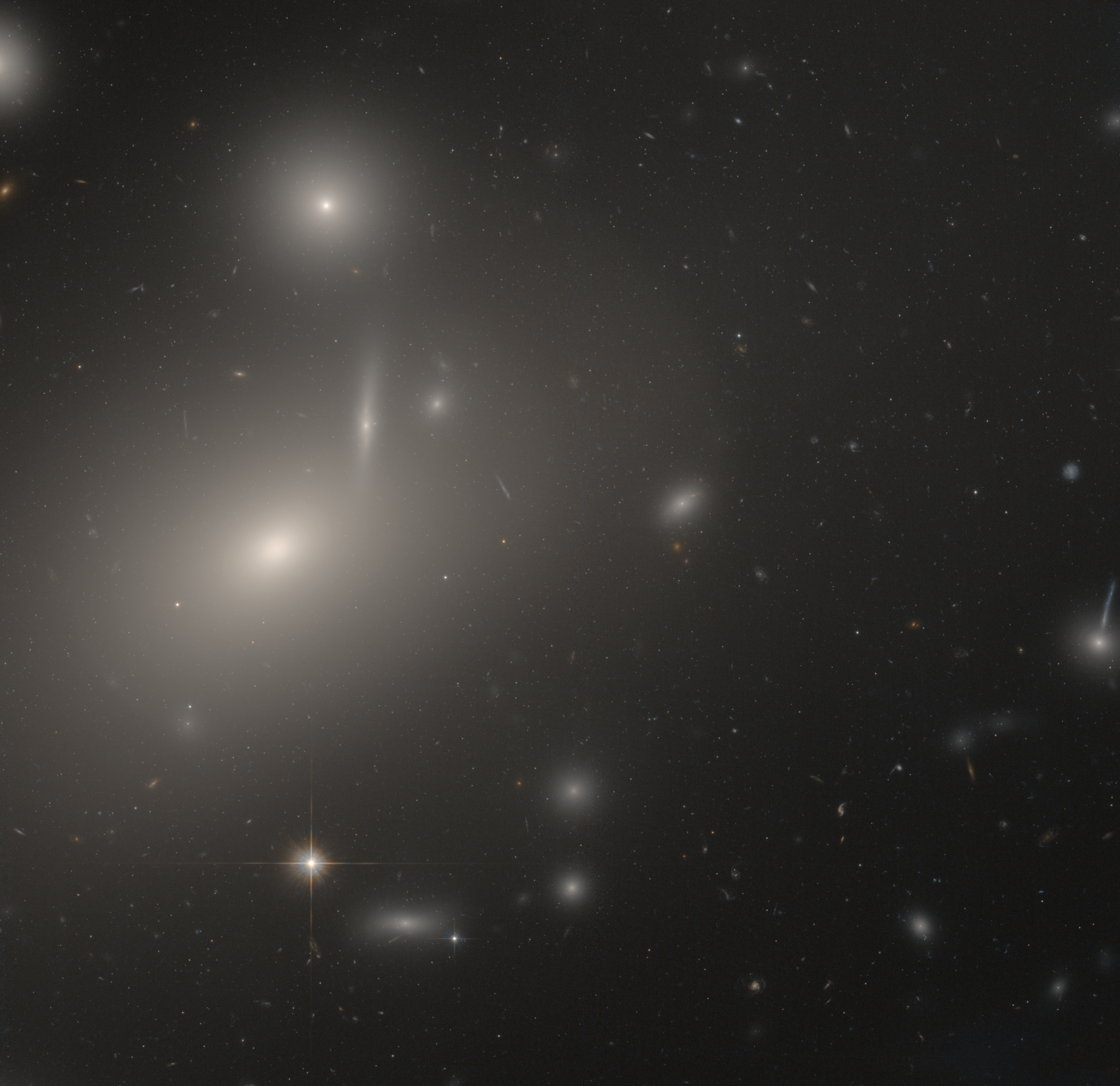
Elliptical galaxy NGC 4889 in front of hundreds of background galaxies.

Giant elliptical galaxies like NGC 4889 are believed to be the result of multiple mergers of smaller galaxies. There is now little dust remaining to form the diffuse nebulae where new stars are created, so the stellar population is dominated by old, population II stars that contain relatively low abundances of elements other than hydrogen and helium. The egg-like shape of this galaxy is maintained by random orbital motions of its member stars, in contrast to the more orderly rotational motions found in a spiral galaxy such as the Milky Way. NGC 4889 has 15,800 globular clusters, more than Messier 87, which has 12,000. This is half of NGC 4874's collection of globular clusters, which has 30,000 globular clusters.

The space between the stars in the galaxy is filled with a diffuse interstellar medium of gas, which has been filled by the elements ejected from stars as they passed beyond the end of their main sequence lifetime. Carbon and nitrogen are being continuously supplied by intermediate mass stars as they pass through the asymptotic giant branch. The heavier elements from oxygen to iron are primarily produced by supernova explosions within the galaxy. The interstellar medium is continuously heated by the emission of in-falling gases towards its central SMBH.

=== Supermassive black hole ===
On December 5, 2011, astronomers measured the velocity dispersion of the central regions of two massive galaxies, NGC 4889, and the other being NGC 3842 in the Leo Cluster. According to the data of the study, they found out the central supermassive black hole of NGC 4889 is 5,200 times more massive than the central black hole of the Milky Way, or equivalent to 2.1×10^{10} (21 billion) solar masses (best fit of data; possible range is from 6 billion to 37 billion solar masses). This makes it one of the most massive black holes on record. The diameter of the black hole's immense event horizon is about 20 to 124 billion kilometers, 2 to 12 times the diameter of Pluto's orbit. The ionized medium detected around the black hole suggests that NGC 4889 may have been a quasar in the past. It is quiescent, presumably because it has already absorbed all readily available matter.

== Environment ==
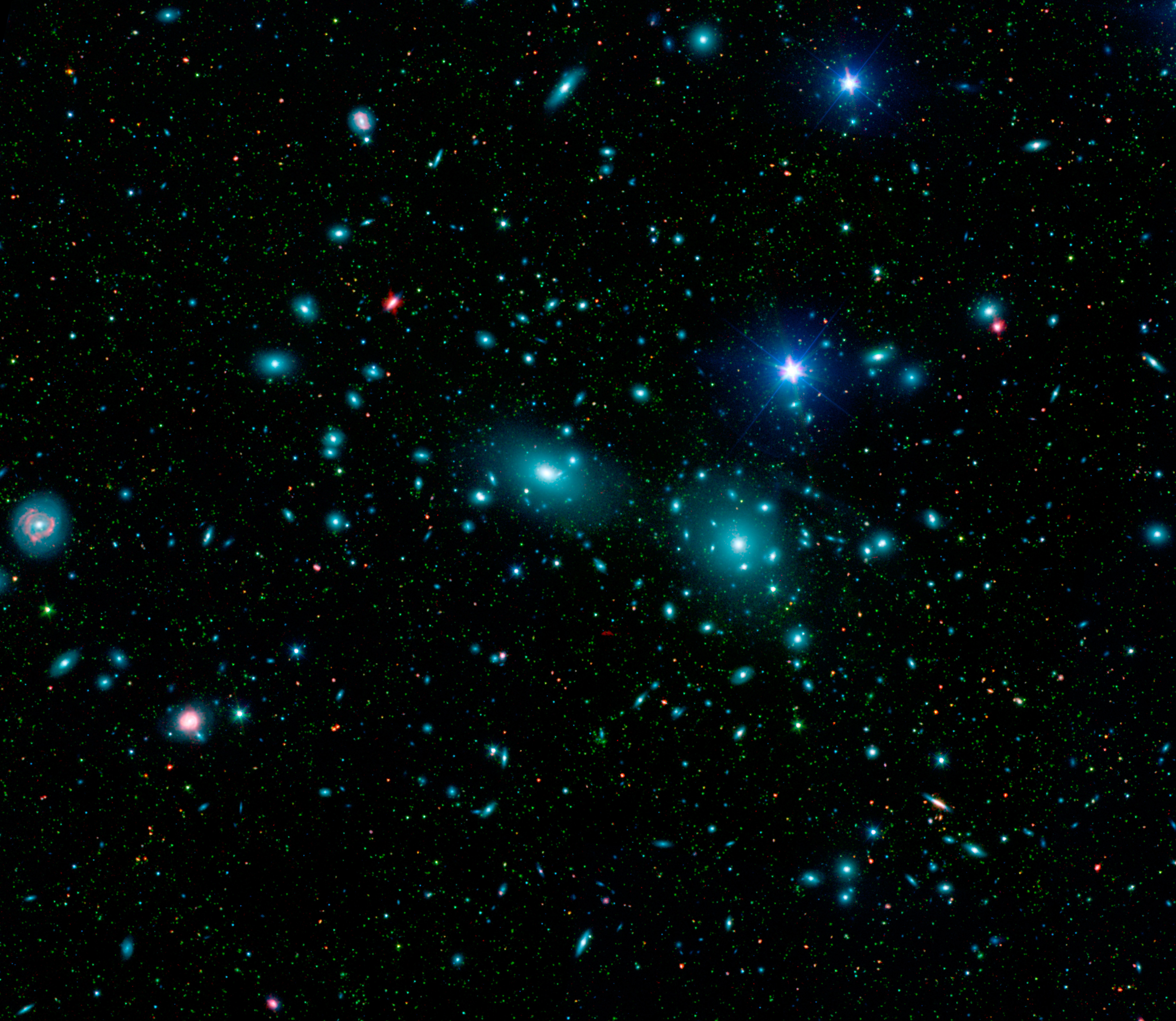
The Coma Cluster taken using data from the Sloan Digital Sky Survey and the Spitzer Space Telescope. NGC 4889 is at the center.

NGC 4889 lies at the center of the component A of the Coma Cluster, a giant cluster of 2,000 galaxies which it shares with NGC 4874, although NGC 4889 is sometimes referred as the cluster center, and it has been called by its other designation A1656-BCG. The total mass of the cluster is estimated to be on the order of 4×10^{15} M_{☉}.

The Coma Cluster is located at exactly the center of the Coma Supercluster, which is one of the nearest superclusters to the Laniakea Supercluster. The Coma Supercluster itself is within the CfA Homunculus, the center of the CfA2 Great Wall, the nearest galaxy filament to Earth and one of the largest structures in the known universe.
