= NGC 4874 =

Galaxy in the constellation Coma Berenices

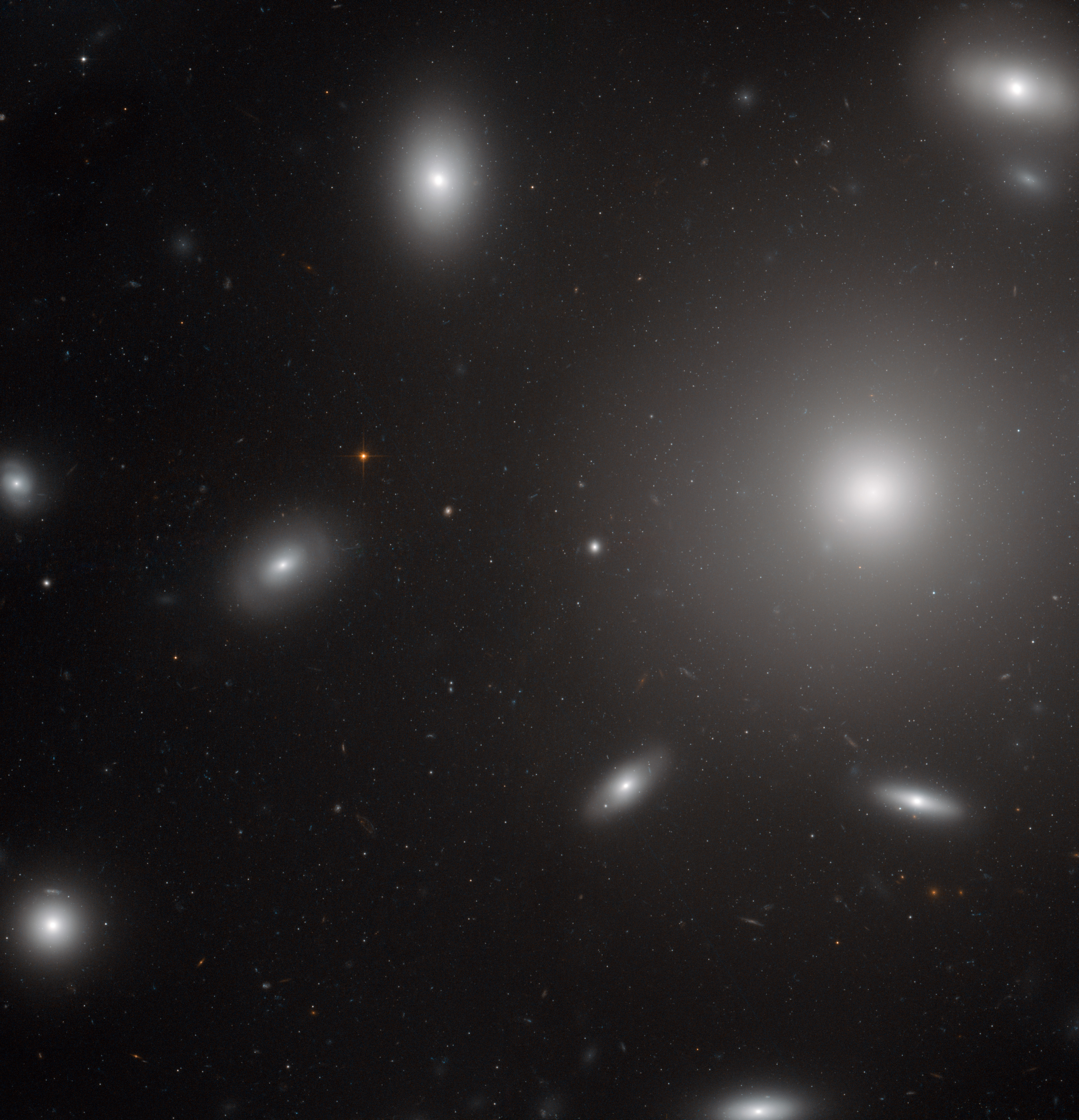
- NGC 4874 dominates this picture created from optical and near-infrared exposures taken with the Wide Field Channel of Hubble's Advanced Camera for Surveys. (Credit: ESA/Hubble, NASA)

Observation data (J2000 epoch)
- Constellation: Coma Berenices
- Right ascension: 12^{h} 59^{m} 35.709^{s}
- Declination: +27° 57′ 33.80″
- Redshift: 0.023907±0.00000667
- Heliocentric radial velocity: 7,167±2 km/s
- Distance: 315.73 ± 6.41 Mly (96.804 ± 1.966 Mpc)
- Group or cluster: Coma Cluster
- Apparent magnitude (V): 11.4
- Apparent magnitude (B): 13.7

Characteristics
- Type: cD; Di
- Size: 79.792 to 82.79 kpc (260,250 to 270,020 ly) (diameter; D_{25.0} B-band and 2MASS K-band total isophotes
- Apparent size (V): 1.9′ × 1.9′

Other designations
- 2MASX J12593570+2757338, UGC 8103, LEDA 44628, MCG +05-31-070, PGC 44628, CGCG 160-231, SDSS J125935.70+275733.3

NGC 4874 is a supergiant elliptical galaxy in the constellation of Coma Berenices. It was discovered on 11 April 1785 by German-British astronomer William Herschel, who catalogued it as a bright patch of nebulous feature. The second-brightest galaxy within the northern Coma Cluster, it is located at a distance of about 97 megaparsecs (316,000,000 light-years) from Earth.

== Characteristics ==
The galaxy is surrounded by an immense stellar halo that extends up to around ten times the size of the Milky Way Galaxy, somewhere roughly one million light-years in diameter. It is also enveloped by a huge cloud of interstellar medium that is currently being heated by the action of infalling material from its central supermassive black hole. A jet of highly energetic plasma extends out to 1,700 light-years from its center. The galaxy has more than 30,000 globular clusters.

== Supernovae ==
Three supernovae have been observed in NGC 4874:

- SN 1968B (type unknown, mag. 17.4) was discovered by Fritz Zwicky on 3 February 1968.
- SN 1981G (Type Ia, mag. 15) was discovered by Miklós Lovas on 2 June 1981.
- SN 2025ilo (Type Ib, mag. 20.6) was discovered by A. Horti-David, K. Sarneczky, and J. Vinko on 26 April 2025.

== See also ==
- List of largest galaxies
