= Coma Cluster =

Cluster of galaxies in the constellation Coma Berenices

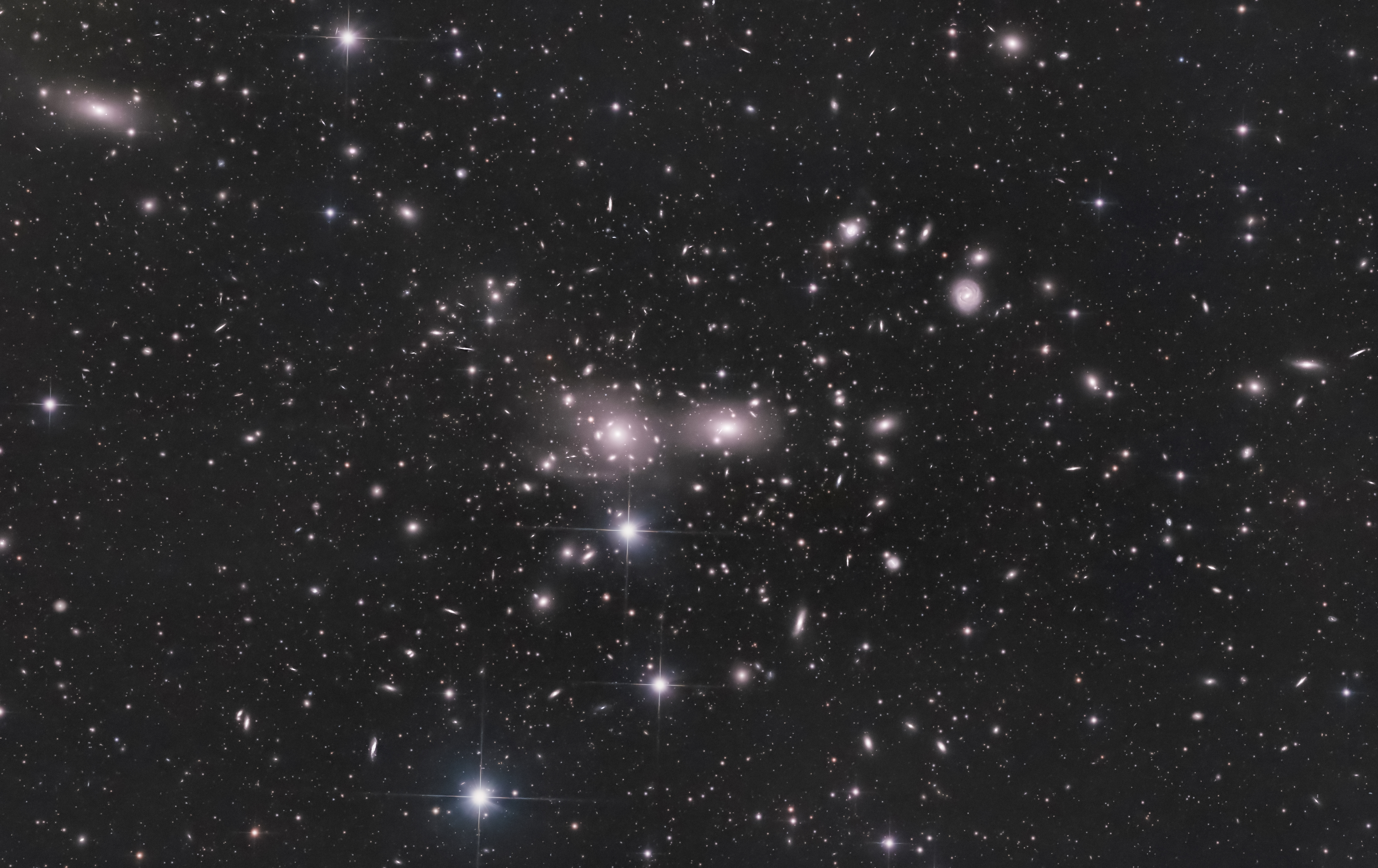

Observation data (Epoch J2000)
- Constellation: Coma Berenices
- Right ascension: 12^{h} 59^{m} 48.7^{s}
- Declination: +27° 58′ 50″
- Brightest member: NGC 4874 and NGC 4889
- Number of galaxies: > 1000
- Richness class: 2
- Bautz–Morgan classification: II
- Velocity dispersion: 1,000 km/s
- Redshift: 0.0231 (6 925 km/s)
- Distance: 102.975 Mpc (336 Mly) for h^{−1}_{0.705}
- ICM temperature: 8–9 keV
- Binding mass: ~7×10^{14} M_{☉}
- X-ray flux: (319.20 ± 2.6%)×10^{−12} erg s^{−1} cm^{−2} (0.1–2.4 keV)

Other designations
- Abell 1656

The Coma Cluster (Abell 1656) is a large cluster of galaxies that contains over 1,000 identified galaxies. Along with the Leo Cluster (Abell 1367), it is one of the two major clusters comprising the Coma Supercluster. It is located in and takes its name from the constellation Coma Berenices. It is one of the first galaxy clusters that was remarked upon in the astronomy literature, being visually noted by William Herschel in 1785 and photographically surveyed by Max Wolf in 1901.

The cluster's mean distance from Earth is 99 Mpc (321 million light years). Its ten brightest spiral galaxies have apparent magnitudes of 12–14 that are observable with amateur telescopes larger than 20 cm. The central region is dominated by two supergiant elliptical galaxies: NGC 4874 and NGC 4889. The cluster is within a few degrees of the north galactic pole on the sky. Most of the galaxies that inhabit the central portion of the Coma Cluster are ellipticals. Both dwarf and giant ellipticals are found in abundance in the Coma Cluster.

== Cluster members ==
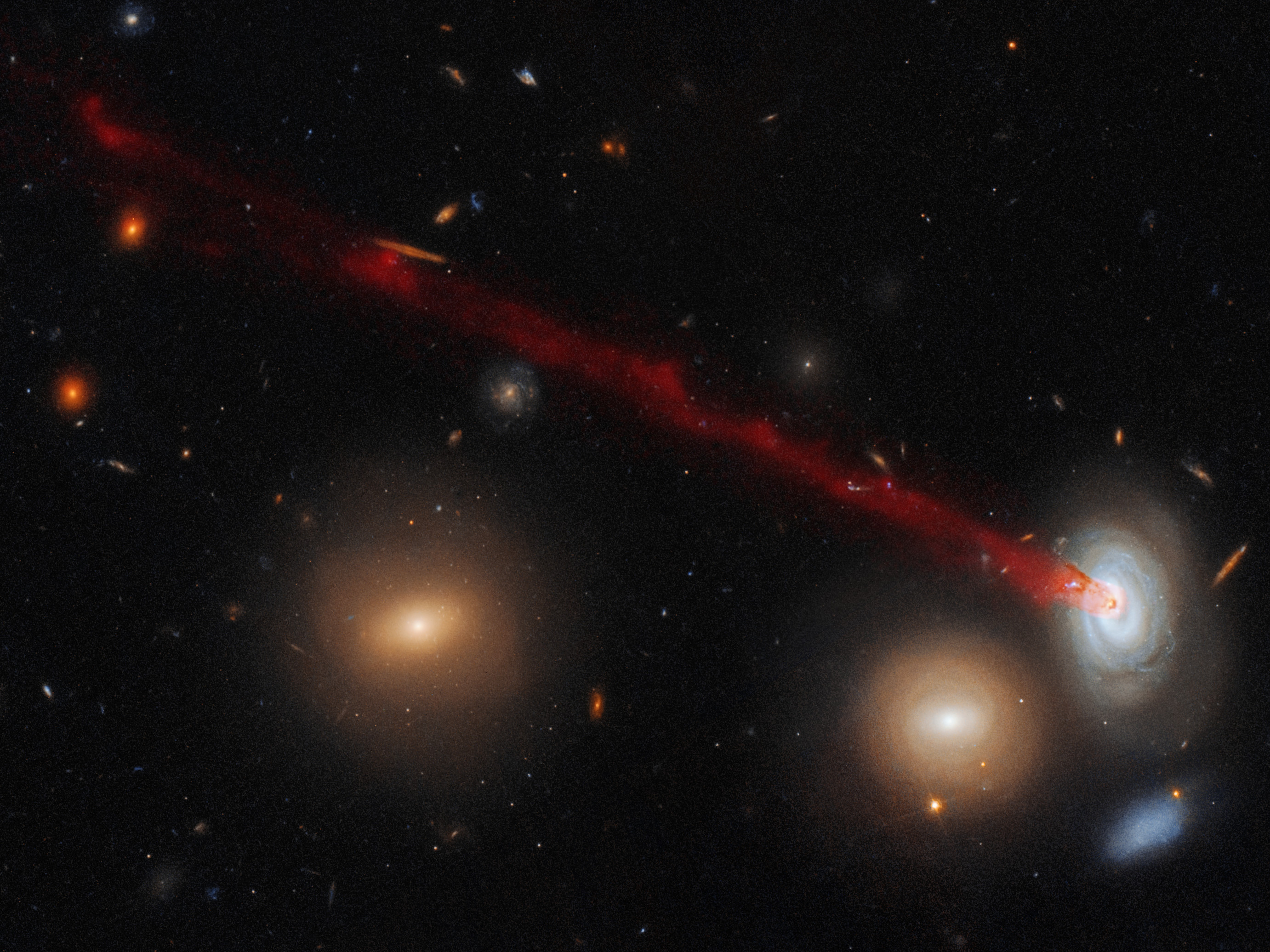
Tails in spiral galaxy D100, found in the Coma Cluster, are created by ram-pressure stripping.

As is usual for clusters of this richness, the galaxies are overwhelmingly elliptical and S0 galaxies, with only a few spirals of younger age, and many of them probably near the outskirts of the cluster. Some of the galaxies in the Coma Cluster have also been identified as ultra diffuse galaxies.

The full extent of the cluster was not understood until it was more thoroughly studied in the 1950s by astronomers at Mount Palomar Observatory, although many of the individual galaxies in the cluster had been identified previously.

== Dark matter ==
The Coma Cluster is one of the first places where observed gravitational anomalies were considered to be indicative of unobserved mass. In 1933 Fritz Zwicky showed that the galaxies of the Coma Cluster were moving too fast for the cluster to be bound together by the visible matter of its galaxies. Though the idea of dark matter would not be accepted for another fifty years, Zwicky wrote that the galaxies must be held together by "dunkle Materie" (dark matter).

About 90% of the mass of the Coma cluster is believed to be in the form of dark matter.

== X-ray source ==
An extended X-ray source centered at 1300+28 in the direction of the Coma cluster of galaxies was reported before August 1966. This X-ray observation was performed by balloon, but the source was not detected in the sounding rocket flight launched by the X-ray astronomy group at the Naval Research Laboratory on November 25, 1964. A strong X-ray source was observed by the X-ray observatory satellite Uhuru close to the center of the Coma cluster and this source was suggested to be designated Coma X-1.

The Coma cluster contains about 800 galaxies within a 100 × 100 arc-min area of the celestial sphere. The source near the center at RA (1950) 12^{h}56^{m} ± 2^{m} Dec 28°6' ± 12' has a luminosity L_{x} = 2.6 × 10^{44} ergs/s. As the source is extended, with a size of about 45', this argues against the possibility that a single galaxy is responsible for the emission. The Uhuru observations indicated a source strength of no greater than ~10^{−3} photons cm^{−2}s^{−1}keV^{−1} at 25 keV, which disagrees with the earlier observations claiming a source strength of ~10^{−2} photons cm^{−2}s^{−1}keV^{−1} at 25 keV, and a size of 5°.

== Gallery ==
Thousands of globular clusters lying at the core of a galaxy cluster

A large portion of the Coma Cluster seen by Hubble's Advanced Camera for Surveys

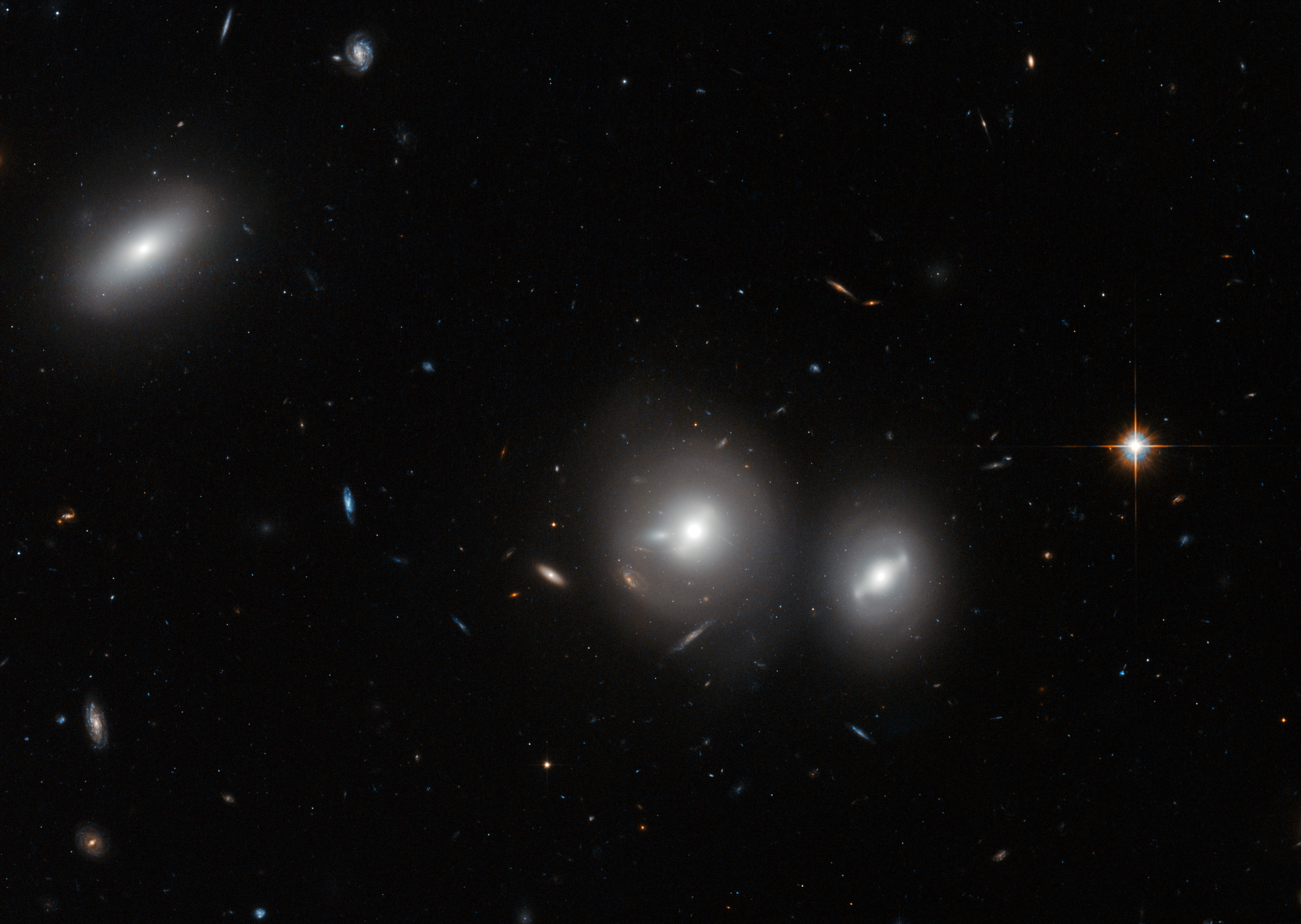
Hubble close-up on the Coma Cluster

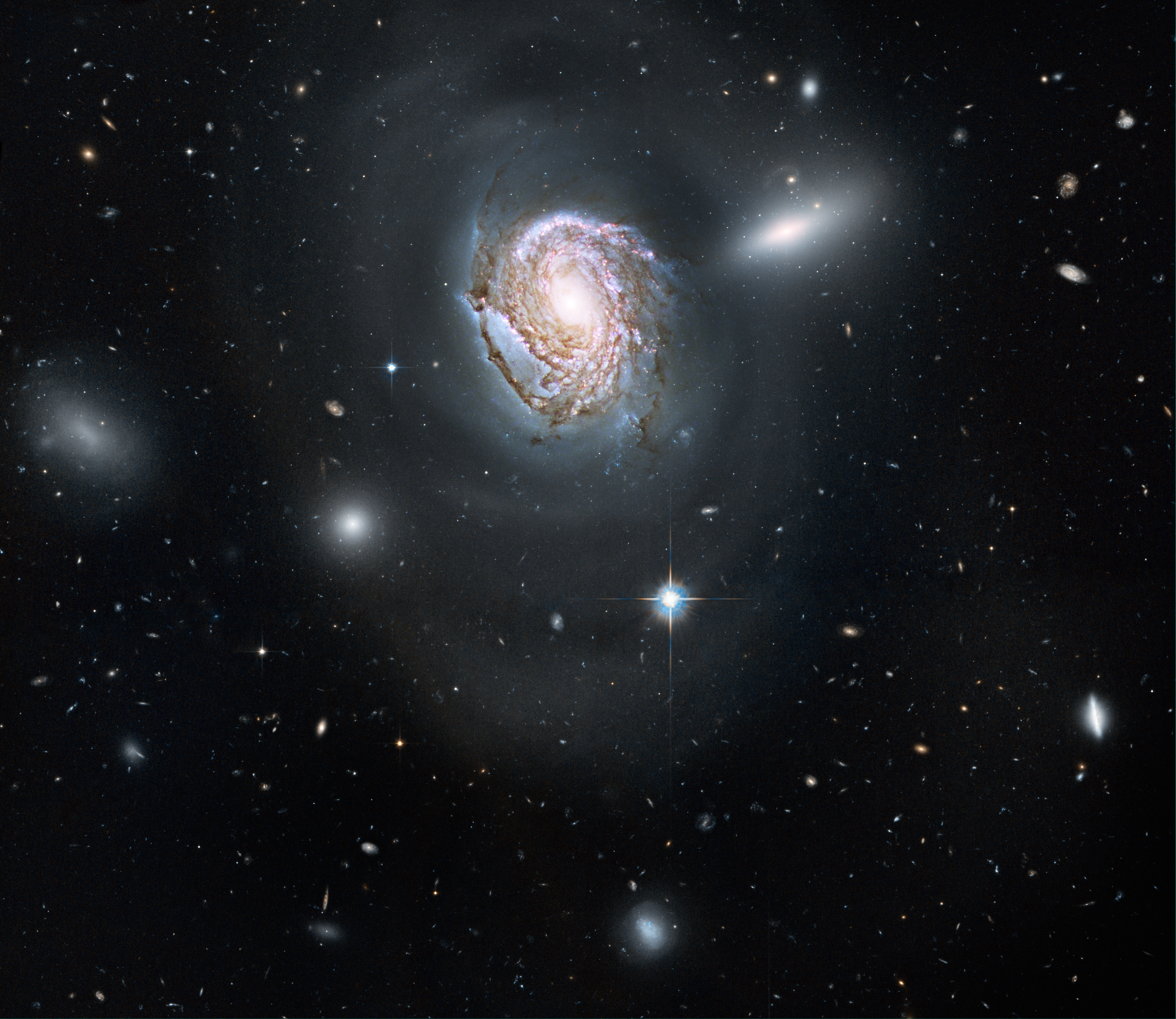
A face-on view of a spiral galaxy (NGC 4911) located deep within the Coma Cluster

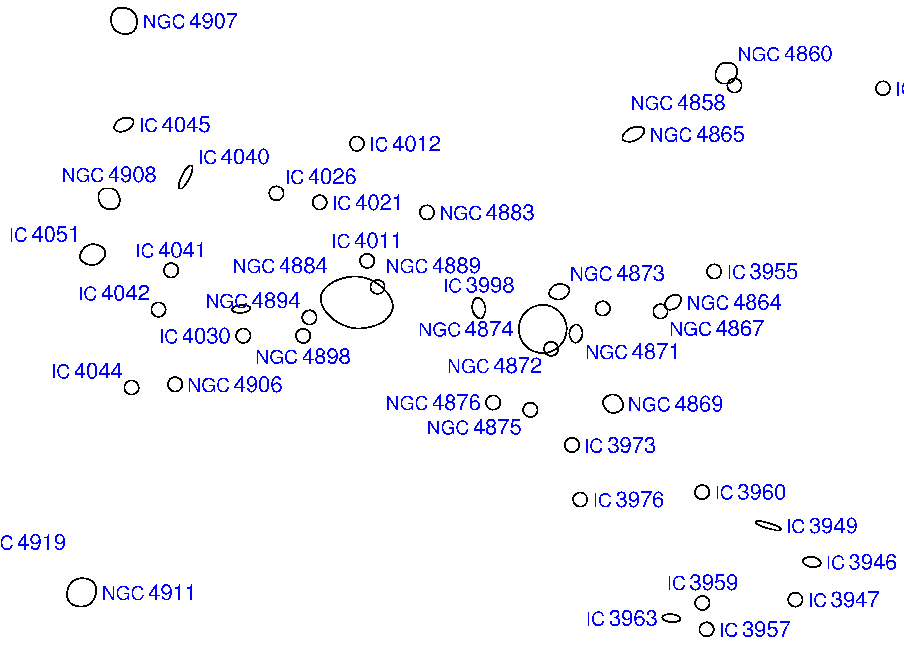
Map of the central part of the Coma Cluster.

== See also ==
- List of Abell clusters
- List of galaxy groups and clusters
- Eridanus Cluster
- Fornax Cluster – another nearby cluster of galaxies
- Norma Cluster
- Virgo Cluster – another nearby cluster of galaxies
- X-1 X-ray source
