= List of stars in Coma Berenices =

This is the list of notable stars in the constellation Coma Berenices, sorted by decreasing brightness.

Name	B	F	Var	HD	HIP	RA	Dec	vis. mag.	abs. mag.	Dist. (ly)	Sp. class	Notes
β Com	β	43		114710	64394	13^{h} 11^{m} 52.92^{s}	+27° 52′ 33.7″	4.26	4.42	30	G0V	suspected BY Dra variable, ΔV = 0.02^{m}
α Com A	α	42		114378	64241	13^{h} 09^{m} 59.55^{s}	+17° 31′ 44.8″	4.32	3.54	47	F5V	Diadem; double star; suspected Algol variable, V_{max} = 4.29^{m}, V_{min} = 4.35^{m}, P = 9485.68 d
γ Com	γ	15		108381	60742	12^{h} 26^{m} 56.33^{s}	+28° 16′ 07.0″	4.35	0.76	167	K1III Fe0.5	Al Dafirah
11 Com		11		107383	60202	12^{h} 20^{m} 43.09^{s}	+17° 47′ 33.6″	4.72	−0.50	361	G8III	
36 Com		36		112769	63355	12^{h} 58^{m} 55.47^{s}	+17° 24′ 33.7″	4.76	−0.05	299	M0III	suspected variable, V_{max} = 4.74^{m}, V_{min} = 4.82^{m}
12 Com A		12		107700	60351	12^{h} 22^{m} 30.32^{s}	+25° 50′ 46.3″	4.78	0.16	273	F8:p...	double star; suspected variable, V_{max} = 4.78^{m}, V_{min} = 4.89^{m}
23 Com		23		109485	61394	12^{h} 34^{m} 51.12^{s}	+22° 37′ 45.1″	4.80	−0.44	365	A0IV	Phyllon Kissinou
41 Com		41		113996	64022	13^{h} 07^{m} 10.71^{s}	+27° 37′ 29.7″	4.80	−0.04	303	K5III	has a planet (b)
35 Com		35		112033	62886	12^{h} 53^{m} 17.77^{s}	+21° 14′ 42.1″	4.89	−0.10	324	G8III	
37 Com		37	LU	112989	63462	13^{h} 00^{m} 16.49^{s}	+30° 47′ 06.1″	4.90	−2.32	898	K1IIIp	RS CVn variable, ΔV = 0.15^{m}
14 Com		14		108283	60697	12^{h} 26^{m} 24.07^{s}	+27° 16′ 05.7″	4.92	0.30	273	F0p	
7 Com		7		106714	59847	12^{h} 16^{m} 20.56^{s}	+23° 56′ 43.5″	4.93	0.52	248	K0III	
31 Com		31	LS	111812	62763	12^{h} 51^{m} 41.93^{s}	+27° 32′ 26.6″	4.93	0.06	307	G0III	Polaris Galacticum Borealis, Lángjiāng (郎將), FK Com variable, V_{max} = 4.87^{m}, V_{min} = 4.97^{m}
16 Com		16		108382	60746	12^{h} 26^{m} 59.30^{s}	+26° 49′ 32.6″	4.98	0.29	282	A4V	
HD 106760				106760	59856	12^{h} 16^{m} 30.17^{s}	+33° 03′ 42.5″	4.99	0.13	306	K1III	suspected variable
24 Com A		24		109511	61418	12^{h} 35^{m} 07.76^{s}	+18° 22′ 37.2″	5.03	−1.34	614	K2III	double star; suspected variable, V_{max} = 4.98^{m}, V_{min} = 5.06^{m}
6 Com		6		106661	59819	12^{h} 16^{m} 00.23^{s}	+14° 53′ 56.9″	5.09	1.18	198	A3V	
27 Com		27		111067	62356	12^{h} 46^{m} 38.75^{s}	+16° 34′ 39.5″	5.12	0.15	322	K3III	
13 Com		13	GN	107966	60514	12^{h} 24^{m} 18.54^{s}	+26° 05′ 55.0″	5.17	0.47	284	A3V	α² Cvn variable, V_{max} = 5.15^{m}, V_{min} = 5.18^{m}
α Com B	α	42		114379		13^{h} 09^{m} 59.30^{s}	+17° 31′ 46.0″	5.22				component of the α Com system
17 Com		17	AI	108662	60904	12^{h} 28^{m} 54.72^{s}	+25° 54′ 46.4″	5.29	0.70	270	A0p	α² Cvn and δ Sct variable, V_{max} = 5.23^{m}, V_{min} = 5.4^{m}, P = 5.0633 d
21 Com		21	UU	108945	61071	12^{h} 31^{m} 00.57^{s}	+24° 34′ 01.9″	5.44	0.57	311	A2pvar	Kissīn; α² CVn and δ Sct variable, V_{max} = 5.41^{m}, V_{min} = 5.46^{m}
18 Com		18		108722	60941	12^{h} 29^{m} 27.05^{s}	+24° 06′ 32.1″	5.47	1.36	216	F5III	
26 Com		26		110024	61724	12^{h} 39^{m} 07.36^{s}	+21° 03′ 45.3″	5.49	0.77	286	G9III	
HD 107325				107325	60170	12^{h} 20^{m} 19.72^{s}	+26° 37′ 11.1″	5.52	2.11	157	K2III-IV	suspected variable, V_{max} = 5.50^{m}, V_{min} = 5.56^{m}
FS Com		40	FS	113866	63950	13^{h} 06^{m} 22.58^{s}	+22° 36′ 58.6″	5.53	−0.69	572	M5III	semiregular variable, V_{max} = 5.3^{m}, V_{min} = 6.1^{m}, P = 58 d
5 Com		5		106057	59501	12^{h} 12^{m} 09.30^{s}	+20° 32′ 31.6″	5.60	−0.26	484	K0II-III	
4 Com		4		105981	59468	12^{h} 11^{m} 51.20^{s}	+25° 52′ 13.3″	5.66	−1.22	774	K4III	variable star, ΔV = 0.005^{m}, P = 6.71096 d
20 Com		20		108765	60957	12^{h} 29^{m} 43.22^{s}	+20° 53′ 46.3″	5.68	1.22	254	A3V	
25 Com		25		109742	61571	12^{h} 36^{m} 58.35^{s}	+17° 05′ 22.5″	5.70	−0.31	518	K5III	
HD 106887				106887	59923	12^{h} 17^{m} 30.60^{s}	+28° 56′ 13.6″	5.71	2.07	174	A4m	
29 Com		29		111397	62541	12^{h} 48^{m} 54.20^{s}	+14° 07′ 21.5″	5.71	0.25	402	A1V	36 Virginis
HD 116706				116706	65466	13^{h} 25^{m} 06.68^{s}	+23° 51′ 16.0″	5.75	1.29	254	A3IV	suspected variable
30 Com		30		111469	62576	12^{h} 49^{m} 17.51^{s}	+27° 33′ 08.4″	5.76	0.75	327	A2V	
HD 109519				109519	61420	12^{h} 35^{m} 08.15^{s}	+21° 52′ 53.2″	5.86	−0.65	652	K1III	
2 Com		2		104827	58858	12^{h} 04^{m} 16.58^{s}	+21° 27′ 33.0″	5.89	0.68	359	F0IV-V	
HD 114326				114326	64226	13^{h} 09^{m} 47.89^{s}	+16° 50′ 55.1″	5.91	−0.85	733	K5III	suspected variable
38 Com		38		113095	63533	13^{h} 01^{m} 09.62^{s}	+17° 07′ 23.5″	5.97	0.52	400	K0III	
39 Com		39		113848	63948	13^{h} 06^{m} 21.28^{s}	+21° 09′ 12.6″	6.00	2.51	163	F4V	
HD 105805				105805	59364	12^{h} 10^{m} 46.10^{s}	+27° 16′ 53.5″	6.01	1.14	308	A4Vn	suspected variable, V_{max} = 6.00^{m}, V_{min} = 6.04^{m}
HD 108123				108123	60599	12^{h} 25^{m} 15.07^{s}	+23° 55′ 34.7″	6.03	0.11	497	K0III	
HD 114889				114889	64496	13^{h} 13^{m} 12.54^{s}	+18° 43′ 37.7″	6.10	1.30	297	G8III	
HD 117876				117876	66086	13^{h} 32^{m} 48.17^{s}	+24° 20′ 50.0″	6.11	0.32	470	G8III	
HD 107326				107326	60168	12^{h} 20^{m} 17.84^{s}	+26° 00′ 06.6″	6.16	2.25	198	F0IV	suspected variable, V_{max} = 6.12^{m}, V_{min} = 6.16^{m}
HD 113022				113022	63497	13^{h} 00^{m} 38.86^{s}	+18° 22′ 22.3″	6.20	3.14	133	F6Vs	
HD 114092				114092	64077	13^{h} 07^{m} 53.66^{s}	+27° 33′ 22.0″	6.20	0.82	389	K4III	
HD 107655				107655	60327	12^{h} 22^{m} 10.86^{s}	+24° 46′ 26.0″	6.21	1.20	327	A0V	
HD 107054				107054	60018	12^{h} 18^{m} 31.57^{s}	+30° 14′ 57.6″	6.23	2.51	181	A9.5III	
8 Com		8		107168	60087	12^{h} 19^{m} 19.20^{s}	+23° 02′ 04.9″	6.26	1.55	285	A8m	
22 Com		22		109307	61295	12^{h} 33^{m} 34.23^{s}	+24° 16′ 58.8″	6.28	1.15	346	A4V	
HD 111893				111893	62825	12^{h} 52^{m} 27.52^{s}	+16° 07′ 21.1″	6.29	1.05	364	A7V	
LW Com			LW	111395	62523	12^{h} 48^{m} 47.26^{s}	+24° 50′ 25.7″	6.31	5.12	56	G7V	BY Dra variable, ΔV = 0.10^{m}, P = 15.80 d
HD 114724				114724	64417	13^{h} 12^{m} 08.42^{s}	+24° 15′ 29.3″	6.31	0.32	513	K1III	
HD 107398				107398	60197	12^{h} 20^{m} 41.37^{s}	+27° 03′ 17.4″	6.32	1.49	301	F3V + F3V	suspected variable
32 Com		32		111862	62807	12^{h} 52^{m} 12.26^{s}	+17° 04′ 26.2″	6.32	−2.43	1831	M0III	variable star, ΔV = 0.011^{m}, P = 52.08333 d
HD 106926				106926	59941	12^{h} 17^{m} 44.24^{s}	+15° 08′ 41.3″	6.36	0.30	532	K4III	
9 Com		9		107213	60098	12^{h} 19^{m} 29.66^{s}	+28° 09′ 26.0″	6.38	2.90	162	F8Vs	
HD 109996				109996	61719	12^{h} 39^{m} 02.21^{s}	+22° 39′ 34.4″	6.39	1.15	364	K1III	
3 Com		3		105778	59352	12^{h} 10^{m} 31.64^{s}	+16° 48′ 33.4″	6.40	−0.81	903	A4V	suspected variable
HD 108007				108007	60525	12^{h} 24^{m} 26.81^{s}	+25° 34′ 56.7″	6.41	1.46	319	F0V	
HD 112060				112060	62904	12^{h} 53^{m} 32.20^{s}	+19° 28′ 53.4″	6.42	3.20	144	G5IV	
HD 111591				111591	62653	12^{h} 50^{m} 17.23^{s}	+22° 51′ 48.8″	6.43	0.80	435	K0III	has a planet (b)
HD 115365				115365	64779	13^{h} 16^{m} 32.33^{s}	+19° 47′ 06.8″	6.43	1.76	280	F0V	
FM Com			FM	107131	60066	12^{h} 19^{m} 02.03^{s}	+26° 00′ 30.1″	6.44	2.03	248	Am	δ Sct variable, V_{max} = 6.4^{m}, V_{min} = 6.48^{m}, P = 0.0551 d
HD 115319				115319	64751	13^{h} 16^{m} 14.35^{s}	+19° 03′ 06.2″	6.46	1.59	307	G8III	
HD 106022				106022	59489	12^{h} 12^{m} 00.97^{s}	+28° 32′ 11.3″	6.47	1.94	263	F5V	
HD 107415				107415	60210	12^{h} 20^{m} 48.75^{s}	+15° 32′ 27.5″	6.47	0.64	479	K0	
28 Com		28		111308	62478	12^{h} 48^{m} 14.36^{s}	+13° 33′ 11.2″	6.47	0.99	407	A1V	
HD 115404				115404	64797	13^{h} 16^{m} 50.67^{s}	+17° 01′ 04.1″	6.49	6.24	37	K2V	
1 Com		1		104452	58661	12^{h} 01^{m} 44.30^{s}	+22° 05′ 39.6″	6.57	0.61	507	G0II	
24 Com B		24		109510	61415	12^{h} 35^{m} 06.35^{s}	+18° 22′ 37.3″	6.57	−2.96	2629	A7m	component of the 24 Com system; suspected variable, V_{max} = 6.55^{m}, V_{min} = 6.59^{m}
17 Com		17		108651	60891	12^{h} 28^{m} 44.58^{s}	+25° 53′ 57.7″	6.63	2.14	258	A0p	
10 Com		10		107276	60123	12^{h} 19^{m} 50.63^{s}	+28° 27′ 51.8″	6.64	1.85	296	Am	
HD 112127				112127	62944	12^{h} 53^{m} 55.75^{s}	+26° 46′ 48.0″	6.88		345	K3III	carbon star
33 Com		33		111892	62819	12^{h} 52^{m} 22.83^{s}	+17° 06′ 30.5″	6.93	1.50	397	F8	
HD 114762				114762	64426	13^{h} 12^{m} 19.74^{s}	+17° 31′ 01.6″	7.30	4.27	132	F9V	has a planet (b)
HD 107146				107146	60074	12^{h} 19^{m} 06.50^{s}	+16° 32′ 53.9″	7.07		93	G2V	has a debris disk
KR Com			KR	115955	65069	13^{h} 20^{m} 15.78^{s}	+17° 45′ 57.0″	7.26		273.7	F5	W UMa variable, V_{max} = 7.26^{m}, V_{min} = 7.32^{m}, P = 0.40797003 d
HD 115708			HH	115708	64936	13^{h} 18^{m} 37.25^{s}	+26° 21′ 56.8″	7.83		377	A2p	α^{2} CVn variable, V_{max} = 7.77^{m}, V_{min} = 7.85^{m}, P = 5.07 d
HD 108863				108863	61020	12^{h} 30^{m} 20^{s}	+21° 56′ 54″	7.89		453	K0	has a planet (b)
HD 116029				116029	65117	13^{h} 20^{m} 40^{s}	+24° 38′ 55″	8.04		402	K1III	has a planet (b)
HD 106103			GM	106103	59527	12^{h} 12^{m} 24.90^{s}	+27° 22′ 48.3″	8.09		277.2	F5V	δ Sct variable, V_{max} = 8.06^{m}, V_{min} = 8.14^{m}, P = 0.208 d
IL Com			IL	108102	60582	12^{h} 25^{m} 02.26^{s}	+25° 33′ 38.4″	8.14		310.2	F8	RS CVn variable, ΔV = 0.04^{m}
FK Com			FK	117555	65915	13^{h} 30^{m} 46.80^{s}	+24° 13′ 57.75″	8.17	1.2	800	G5II	prototype FK Com variable, V_{max} = 8.03^{m}, V_{min} = 8.43^{m}, P = 2.4015 d
HD 110067				110067		12^{h} 39^{m} 21.50^{s}	+20° 01′ 40.0″	8.43		105	K0V	component of a triple star system with HD 110106; has six transiting planets
12 Com B		12		107701		12^{h} 22^{m} 32.30^{s}	+25° 51′ 06.0″	8.60				component of the 12 Com system
IN Com			IN	112313	63087	12^{h} 55^{m} 33.75^{s}	+25° 53′ 30.6″	8.70		2690	G5III-IV	central star of planetary nebula LoTr 5; ΔV = 0.07^{m}
HD 108874				108874	61028	12^{h} 30^{m} 26.88^{s}	+25° 52′ 47.4″	8.76	4.58	224	G5	has two planets (b & c)
HD 110106				110106		12^{h} 39^{m} 37.07^{s}	+19° 55′ 46.9″	8.80			K3V	spectroscopic binary; component of a triple star system with HD 110067
BD +25 2511			HZ			12^{h} 29^{m} 40.92^{s}	+24° 31′ 14.7″	9.76			G8:V...	RS CVn variable, V_{max} = 9.71^{m}, V_{min} = 9.81^{m}
UX Com			UX		63561	13^{h} 01^{m} 33.02^{s}	+28° 37′ 54.1″	10.01		592	G7III:	RS CVn variable, V_{max} = 9.96^{m}, V_{min} = 10.52^{m}, P = 3.642583 d
KELT-6						13^{h} 03^{m} 55.65^{s}	+30° 38′ 24.28″	10.38	3.46	791	F8IV	Has two planets (b & c)
RZ Com			RZ		61414	12^{h} 35^{m} 05.06^{s}	+23° 20′ 14.0″	10.57		614	G0Vn	W UMa variable, V_{max} = 10.42^{m}, V_{min} = 11.13^{m}, P = 0.33850604 d
Feige 66					61602	12^{h} 37^{m} 23.52^{s}	+25° 03′ 59.9″	10.59		530	Op	subdwarf
SS Com			SS			12^{h} 49^{m} 39.08^{s}	+18° 42′ 11.9″	11.00			F5	W UMa variable, V_{max} = 10.75^{m}, V_{min} = 11.31^{m}, P = 0.412822 d
RW Com			RW		61243	12^{h} 33^{m} 00.28^{s}	+26° 42′ 58.8″	11.25		278.4	G2+G2	W UMa variable, V_{max} = 11^{m}, V_{min} = 11.7^{m}, P = 0.237346 d
CC Com			CC			12^{h} 12^{m} 06.03^{s}	+22° 31′ 58.7″	11.61		261.0	K4/5V	W UMa variable, V_{max} = 11.61^{m}, V_{min} = 12.20^{m}, P = 0.2206864 d
U Com			U		61809	12^{h} 40^{m} 03.20^{s}	+27° 29′ 56.1″	11.76		929	A9	RR Lyr variable, V_{max} = 11.5^{m}, V_{min} = 11.97^{m}, P = 0.2927382 d
ST Com			ST		64875	13^{h} 17^{m} 51.34^{s}	+20° 46′ 50.8″	11.92			F5	RR Lyr variable, V_{max} = 11.017^{m}, V_{min} = 11.823^{m}, P = 0.5989210 d
EK Com			EK			12^{h} 51^{m} 21.45^{s}	+27° 13′ 47.0″	12.02			K0V	W UMa variable
HZ 43					64766	13^{h} 16^{m} 21.85^{s}	+29° 05′ 55.4″	12.66		125.6	DA.9 + M3Ve	white dwarf/red dwarf binary system
GD 153						12^{h} 57^{m} 02.34^{s}	+22° 01′ 52.7″	13.35			DA1.2	white dwarf
HZ 21						12^{h} 13^{m} 56.25^{s}	+32° 56′ 31.4″	14.69			DA:	white dwarf
GP Com			GP			13^{h} 05^{m} 42.43^{s}	+18° 01′ 04.0″	15.69			DBe	interacting binary white dwarf, ΔV = 0.6^{m}, has a planet (b)
LM Com			LM			12^{h} 26^{m} 30.90^{s}	+30° 38′ 52.7″	16.15			DA1.7	re-radiating binary system
AL Com			AL			12^{h} 32^{m} 25.80^{s}	+14° 20′ 42.2″	16.2				WZ Sge variable
RBS 1223						13^{h} 08^{m} 48.7^{s}	+21° 27′ 08″	28.6				neutron star
GO Com			GO			12^{h} 56^{m} 37.10^{s}	+26° 36′ 43.7″					SU UMa variable
PSR B1237+25						12^{h} 39^{m} 40.39^{s}	+24° 53′ 49.9″					pulsar
Table legend: Name = Proper name; B = Bayer designation; F or/and G. = Flamsteed designation or Gould designation; Var = Variable-star designation; HD = Henry Draper Catalogue designation number; HIP = Hipparcos Catalogue designation number; RA = Right ascension for the Epoch/Equinox J2000.0; Dec = Declination for the Epoch/Equinox J2000.0; vis. mag. = visual magnitude (m or m_{v}), also known as apparent magnitude; abs. mag. = absolute magnitude (M_{v}); Dist. (ly) = Distance in light-years from Earth; Sp. class = Spectral class of the star in the stellar classification system; Notes = Common name(s) or alternate name(s); comments; notable properties [for example: multiple star status, range of variability if it is a variable star, exoplanets, etc.]

== See also ==
- List of stars by constellation
