= Coma Berenices in Chinese astronomy =

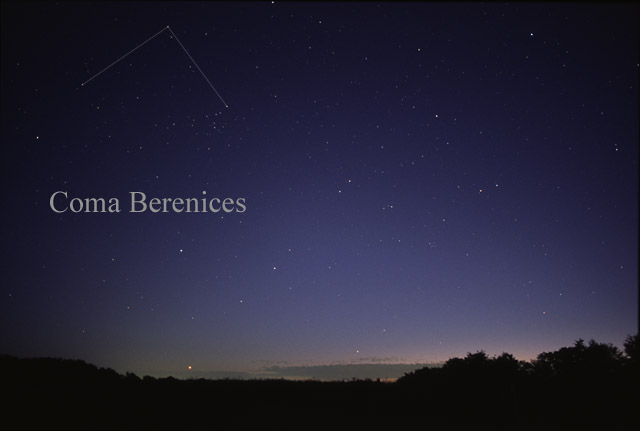
View of Coma Berenices, composed of the stars Alpha Comae Berenices, Beta Comae Berenices and Gamma Comae Berenices.

The modern constellation Coma Berenices lies across one of the quadrants symbolized by the Azure Dragon of the East (東方青龍, Dōng Fāng Qīng Lóng), and Three Enclosures (三垣, Sān Yuán), that divide the sky in traditional Chinese uranography.

The name of the western constellation in modern Chinese is 后髮座 (hòu fà zuò), meaning "behind of queen constellation".

== Star ==
The map of Chinese constellation in constellation Coma Berenices area consists of :

Enclosures	Enclosure (Chinese name)	Romanization	Translation	Asterisms (Chinese name)	Romanization	Translation	Western star name	Proper Name	Chinese star name	Romanization	Translation
Three Enclosures (三垣)	太微垣	Tài Wēi Yuán	Supreme Palace enclosure	太微左垣	Tàiwēizuǒyuán	Left Wall					
Three Enclosures (三垣)	太微垣	Tài Wēi Yuán	Supreme Palace enclosure	太微左垣	Tàiwēizuǒyuán	Left Wall	α Com	Diadem (for component A)			
Three Enclosures (三垣)	太微垣	Tài Wēi Yuán	Supreme Palace enclosure	太微左垣	Tàiwēizuǒyuán	Left Wall	α Com	Diadem (for component A)	太微左垣五	Tàiwēizuǒyuánwǔ	5th star
Three Enclosures (三垣)	太微垣	Tài Wēi Yuán	Supreme Palace enclosure	太微左垣	Tàiwēizuǒyuán	Left Wall	α Com	Diadem (for component A)	東上將	Dōngshǎngjiāng	The First Eastern General
Three Enclosures (三垣)	太微垣	Tài Wēi Yuán	Supreme Palace enclosure	太微左垣	Tàiwēizuǒyuán	Left Wall	α Com	Diadem (for component A)	太左五	Tàizuǒwǔ	5th excellency in the left
Three Enclosures (三垣)	太微垣	Tài Wēi Yuán	Supreme Palace enclosure	九卿	Jiǔqīng	Nine Senior Officers	α Com	Diadem (for component A)			
Three Enclosures (三垣)	太微垣	Tài Wēi Yuán	Supreme Palace enclosure	九卿	Jiǔqīng	Nine Senior Officers	29 Com		九卿侯一	Jiǔqīngzēngyī	1st additional star
Three Enclosures (三垣)	太微垣	Tài Wēi Yuán	Supreme Palace enclosure	九卿	Jiǔqīng	Nine Senior Officers	28 Com		九卿侯三	Jiǔqīngzēngsān	3rd additional star
Three Enclosures (三垣)	太微垣	Tài Wēi Yuán	Supreme Palace enclosure	五諸侯	Wǔzhūhóu	Five Lords					
Three Enclosures (三垣)	太微垣	Tài Wēi Yuán	Supreme Palace enclosure	五諸侯	Wǔzhūhóu	Five Lords	39 Com		五諸侯一	Wǔzhūhóuyī	1st star
Three Enclosures (三垣)	太微垣	Tài Wēi Yuán	Supreme Palace enclosure	五諸侯	Wǔzhūhóu	Five Lords	36 Com		五諸侯二	Wǔzhūhóuèr	2nd star
Three Enclosures (三垣)	太微垣	Tài Wēi Yuán	Supreme Palace enclosure	五諸侯	Wǔzhūhóu	Five Lords	27 Com		五諸侯三	Wǔzhūhóusān	3rd star
Three Enclosures (三垣)	太微垣	Tài Wēi Yuán	Supreme Palace enclosure	五諸侯	Wǔzhūhóu	Five Lords	6 Com		五諸侯五	Wǔzhūhóuwǔ	5th star
Three Enclosures (三垣)	太微垣	Tài Wēi Yuán	Supreme Palace enclosure	五諸侯	Wǔzhūhóu	Five Lords	40 Com		五諸侯增一	Wǔzhūhóuzēngyī	1st additional star
Three Enclosures (三垣)	太微垣	Tài Wēi Yuán	Supreme Palace enclosure	五諸侯	Wǔzhūhóu	Five Lords	35 Com		五諸侯侯二	Wǔzhūhóuzēngèr	2nd additional star
Three Enclosures (三垣)	太微垣	Tài Wēi Yuán	Supreme Palace enclosure	五諸侯	Wǔzhūhóu	Five Lords	38 Com		五諸侯侯三	Wǔzhūhóuzēngsān	3rd additional star
Three Enclosures (三垣)	太微垣	Tài Wēi Yuán	Supreme Palace enclosure	五諸侯	Wǔzhūhóu	Five Lords	25 Com		五諸侯侯四	Wǔzhūhóuzēngsì	4th additional star
Three Enclosures (三垣)	太微垣	Tài Wēi Yuán	Supreme Palace enclosure	五諸侯	Wǔzhūhóu	Five Lords	24 Com		五諸侯侯五	Wǔzhūhóuzēngwǔ	5th additional star
Three Enclosures (三垣)	太微垣	Tài Wēi Yuán	Supreme Palace enclosure	五諸侯	Wǔzhūhóu	Five Lords	11 Com		五諸侯侯六	Wǔzhūhóuzēngliù	6th additional star
Three Enclosures (三垣)	太微垣	Tài Wēi Yuán	Supreme Palace enclosure	五諸侯	Wǔzhūhóu	Five Lords	3 Com		五諸侯侯七	Wǔzhūhóuzēngqī	7th additional star
Three Enclosures (三垣)	太微垣	Tài Wēi Yuán	Supreme Palace enclosure	幸臣	Xìngchén	Officer of Honour	HD 104207		幸臣	Xìngchén	(One star of)
Three Enclosures (三垣)	太微垣	Tài Wēi Yuán	Supreme Palace enclosure	郎將	Lángjiāng	Captain of the Bodyguards					
Three Enclosures (三垣)	太微垣	Tài Wēi Yuán	Supreme Palace enclosure	郎將	Lángjiāng	Captain of the Bodyguards	31 Com		郎將	Lángjiāng	(One star of)
Three Enclosures (三垣)	太微垣	Tài Wēi Yuán	Supreme Palace enclosure	郎將	Lángjiāng	Captain of the Bodyguards	30 Com		郎將增一	Lángjiāngzēngyī	1st additional star
Three Enclosures (三垣)	太微垣	Tài Wēi Yuán	Supreme Palace enclosure	郎將	Lángjiāng	Captain of the Bodyguards	HD 112001		郎將增二	Lángjiāngzēngèr	2nd additional star
Three Enclosures (三垣)	太微垣	Tài Wēi Yuán	Supreme Palace enclosure	郎位	Lángwèi	Officers of the Imperial Guard					
Three Enclosures (三垣)	太微垣	Tài Wēi Yuán	Supreme Palace enclosure	郎位	Lángwèi	Officers of the Imperial Guard	γ Com		郎位一	Lángwèiyī	1st star
Three Enclosures (三垣)	太微垣	Tài Wēi Yuán	Supreme Palace enclosure	郎位	Lángwèi	Officers of the Imperial Guard	14 Com		郎位三	Lángwèisān	3rd star
Three Enclosures (三垣)	太微垣	Tài Wēi Yuán	Supreme Palace enclosure	郎位	Lángwèi	Officers of the Imperial Guard	16 Com		郎位四	Lángwèisì	4th star
Three Enclosures (三垣)	太微垣	Tài Wēi Yuán	Supreme Palace enclosure	郎位	Lángwèi	Officers of the Imperial Guard	17 Com		郎位五	Lángwèiwǔ	5th star
Three Enclosures (三垣)	太微垣	Tài Wēi Yuán	Supreme Palace enclosure	郎位	Lángwèi	Officers of the Imperial Guard	13 Com		郎位六	Lángwèiliù	6th star
Three Enclosures (三垣)	太微垣	Tài Wēi Yuán	Supreme Palace enclosure	郎位	Lángwèi	Officers of the Imperial Guard	12 Com		郎位七	Lángwèiqī	7th star
Three Enclosures (三垣)	太微垣	Tài Wēi Yuán	Supreme Palace enclosure	郎位	Lángwèi	Officers of the Imperial Guard	21 Com		郎位八	Lángwèibā	8th star
Three Enclosures (三垣)	太微垣	Tài Wēi Yuán	Supreme Palace enclosure	郎位	Lángwèi	Officers of the Imperial Guard	18 Com		郎位九	Lángwèijiǔ	9th star
Three Enclosures (三垣)	太微垣	Tài Wēi Yuán	Supreme Palace enclosure	郎位	Lángwèi	Officers of the Imperial Guard	7 Com		郎位十	Lángwèishí	10th star
Three Enclosures (三垣)	太微垣	Tài Wēi Yuán	Supreme Palace enclosure	郎位	Lángwèi	Officers of the Imperial Guard	23 Com	Phyllon Kissinou	郎位十一	Lángwèishíyī	11th star
Three Enclosures (三垣)	太微垣	Tài Wēi Yuán	Supreme Palace enclosure	郎位	Lángwèi	Officers of the Imperial Guard	26 Com		郎位十二	Lángwèishíèr	12th star
Three Enclosures (三垣)	太微垣	Tài Wēi Yuán	Supreme Palace enclosure	郎位	Lángwèi	Officers of the Imperial Guard	20 Com		郎位十三	Lángwèishísān	13th star
Three Enclosures (三垣)	太微垣	Tài Wēi Yuán	Supreme Palace enclosure	郎位	Lángwèi	Officers of the Imperial Guard	5 Com		郎位十四	Lángwèishísì	14th star
Three Enclosures (三垣)	太微垣	Tài Wēi Yuán	Supreme Palace enclosure	郎位	Lángwèi	Officers of the Imperial Guard	2 Com		郎位十五	Lángwèishíwǔ	15th star
Three Enclosures (三垣)	太微垣	Tài Wēi Yuán	Supreme Palace enclosure	郎位	Lángwèi	Officers of the Imperial Guard	10 Com		郎位增一	Lángwèizēngyī	1st additional star
Three Enclosures (三垣)	太微垣	Tài Wēi Yuán	Supreme Palace enclosure	郎位	Lángwèi	Officers of the Imperial Guard	9 Com		郎位增二	Lángwèizēngèr	2nd additional star
Three Enclosures (三垣)	太微垣	Tài Wēi Yuán	Supreme Palace enclosure	郎位	Lángwèi	Officers of the Imperial Guard	4 Com		郎位增三	Lángwèizēngsān	3rd additional star
Azure Dragon of the East (東方青龍)	角	Jiǎo	Horn	周鼎	Zhōudǐng	Tripod of the Zhou					
Azure Dragon of the East (東方青龍)	角	Jiǎo	Horn	周鼎	Zhōudǐng	Tripod of the Zhou	β Com		周鼎一	Zhōudǐngyī	1st star
Azure Dragon of the East (東方青龍)	角	Jiǎo	Horn	周鼎	Zhōudǐng	Tripod of the Zhou	37 Com		周鼎二	Zhōudǐngèr	2nd star
Azure Dragon of the East (東方青龍)	角	Jiǎo	Horn	周鼎	Zhōudǐng	Tripod of the Zhou	41 Com		周鼎三	Zhōudǐngsān	3rd star

== See also ==
- Traditional Chinese star names
- Chinese constellations
