= LoTr 1 =

Planetary nebula in the constellation Lepus

Emission nebula
- Planetary nebula

Observation data: J2000 epoch
- Right ascension: 05^{h} 55^{m} 06.6^{s}
- Declination: −22° 54′ 02″
- Distance: 5,875 ly
- Apparent diameter: 2' 26" ± 4"
- Constellation: Lepus
- Designations: DeHt 1, PK 228-22 1, PN G228.2-22.1, AB Lep

LoTr 1 or DeHt 1 is a bubble-shaped elliptical planetary nebula with a binary central star system. LoTr 1 was discovered with 11 other planetary nebula under the LoTr Catalog and was discovered in 1980 by astronomers A.J Longmore and S.B. Tritton using the UK Schmidt Telescope.

== Characteristics ==
The nucleus of LoTr 1 has similar properties that can be found in other planetary nebulae (PNe) like Abell 35 and LoTr 5, LoTr 1 has a nucleus containing a giant star and a hot companion, the binary system was detected by the International Ultraviolet Explorer. The nebula features a central inner shell with an angular diameter of 47 ± 4" and a expansion age of ~17,000 years. The planetary nebula also features an outer shell with a more irregular shape that has a diameter of 4 ± 26" and an expansion age of ~35,000 years. The inner and outer shell has an expansion velocity of ~25 ± 4 km. The nebula is significantly brighter in ionized oxygen O III wavelengths compared to other emissions. The two slightly elongated shells possess different spatial orientations, this indicates that a separate historical mass-transfer or ejection episodes from the binary interaction occurred. The double-peaked Hα emission lines remain a mystery, but have been hypothesized to come from the active accretion disk.

=== AB Leporis ===
AB Leporis is a binary star system that contains a variable K-type subgiant star with an emission line and a hot white dwarf companion. The K-type giant star was found to have a barium abundance of 0.5 or greater, this classifies the K-type giant star as a barium star. The K-type giant features a rapid rotation period of 6.4 days, which proves past mass accretion activity. The star has a orbital period of ~100 and ~1,500 years and was also spun up to a rapid 6.4-day rotation via wind accretion, this occurred when the star was in the asymptotic giant branch (AGB) phase. The star system has an orbital period of ~11.28 years. The radial velocity of the binary is ~7.4 yr. The lack of observed [Fe V] lines and the absence of the [C III] multiplet imposes a temperature limit of ~105,000 K. The radius for the giant star is ~9.7R while the hot white dwarf has a radius of 0.44R, indicating that it is about to enter white dwarf cooling sequence.
