= Coma Berenices (disambiguation) =

Coma Berenices is a traditional asterism that has since been defined as one of the 88 modern constellations.

Coma Berenices may also refer to:

- Coma Berenices (Chinese astronomy)
- Coma Berenices (album), a 2007 studio album by the Japanese noise musician Merzbow
- Coma Berenices (dwarf galaxy), a dwarf spheroidal galaxy situated in the constellation Coma Berenices
