= Coma Star Cluster =

Open cluster in the constellation Coma Berenices

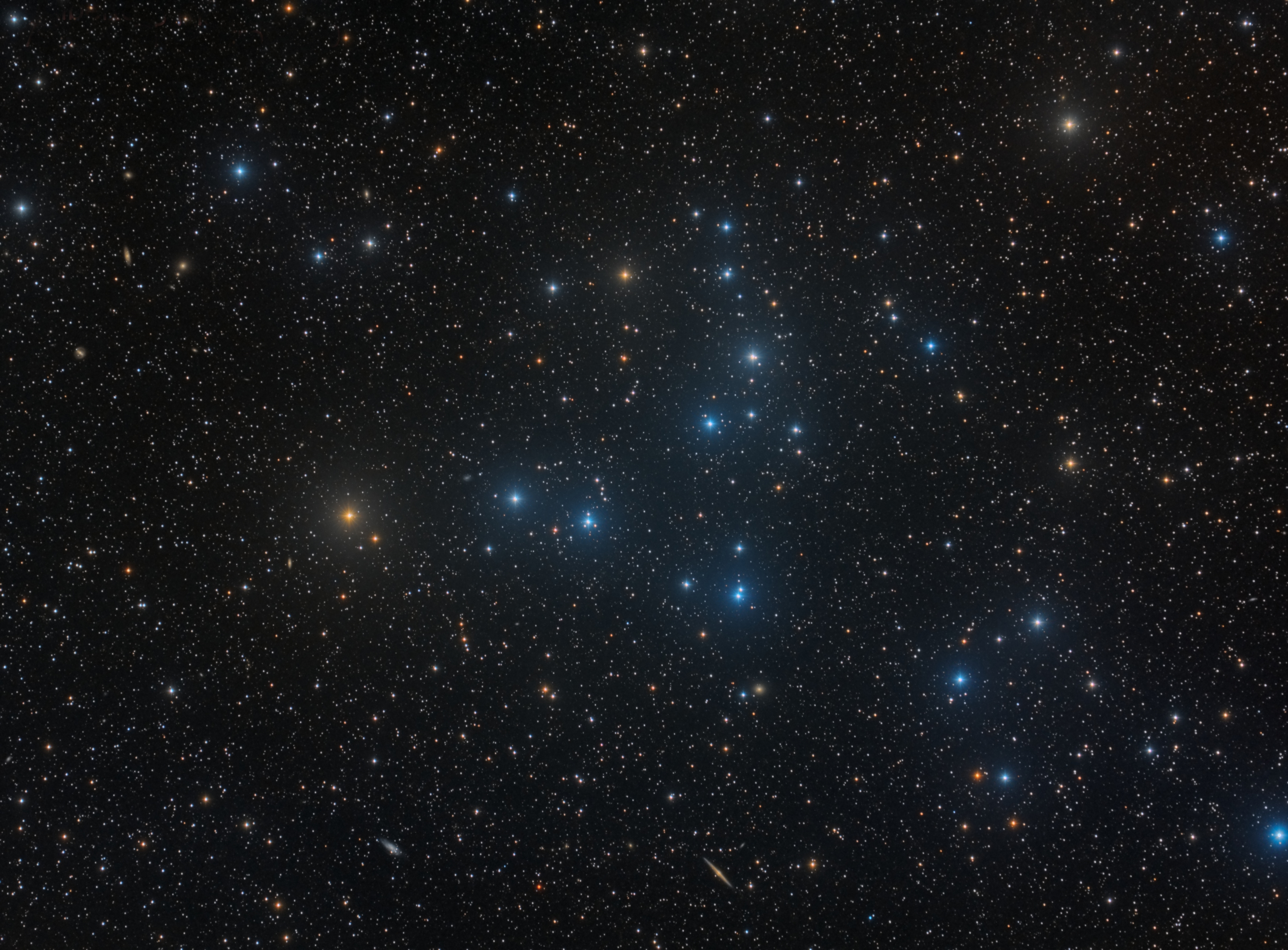
- Coma Star Cluster, Mel 111

Observation data (J2000 epoch)
- Right ascension: 12^{h} 22.5^{m}
- Declination: +25° 51′
- Distance: 280 ly (86 pc)
- Apparent magnitude (V): +1.8
- Apparent dimensions (V): 7.5°

Physical characteristics
- Mass: M_{☉}
- Radius: -
- Estimated age: -
- Second closest open cluster
- Other designations: Coma Ber Cluster, Cr 256, Mel 111, OCl 558.0

Associations
- Constellation: Coma Berenices

The Coma Star Cluster (also known as Melotte 111, Collinder 256, or the Cobweb Cluster) is a nearby open cluster located in the constellation Coma Berenices. The cluster contains about 40 brighter stars (between magnitudes 5 and 10) with a common proper motion. The brighter stars of the cluster make out a distinctive "V" shape as seen when Coma Berenices is rising. The cluster used to represent the tail of Leo. However, in around 240 BC, Ptolemy III renamed it for the Egyptian queen Berenice's legendary sacrifice of her hair.

The Hipparcos satellite and infrared color-magnitude diagram fitting have been used to establish a distance to the cluster's center of approximately 86 parsecs (280 ly). The distance established via the independent analyses agree, thereby making the cluster an important rung on the cosmic distance ladder. The open cluster is roughly twice as distant as the Hyades and covers an area of more than 7.5 degrees on the sky. The cluster is approximately 450 million years old.

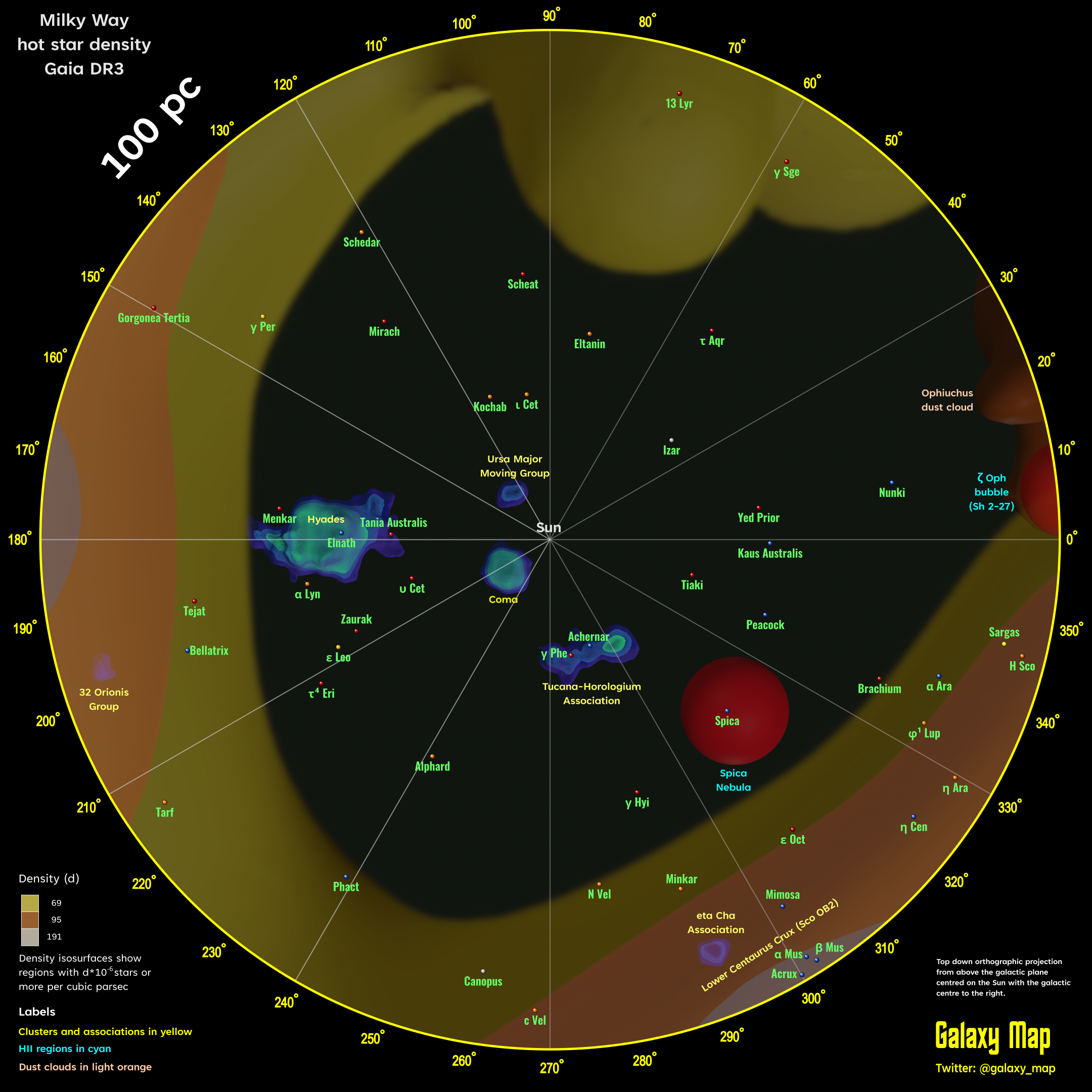
Map of stars and open clusters within 100 parsecs of the Sun. The Ursa moving group is near the center at 225° galactic longitude.

Brightest members (m_{v} < 6.5)
Identifier	Magnitude
γ Com (Note: Outside a nominal 5° radius adopted as the cluster size)	4.81
12 Com	4.81
31 Com	4.94
14 Com	4.95
16 Com	4.96
13 Com	5.18
17 Com	5.24
21 Com	5.44
18 Com (Note: At the same distance as Melotte 111, but its proper motion and isochrone are inconsistent.)	5.47
HD 106887	5.71
HD 105805	5.99
8 Com	6.22
22 Com	6.24
FM Com	6.43

== See also ==
- Alpha Persei Cluster
- List of nearby stellar associations and moving groups
