= 676 Melitta =

Main-belt asteroid

Discovery
- Discovered by: P. Melotte
- Discovery site: Greenwich
- Discovery date: 16 January 1909

Designations
- Pronunciation: /mɪˈlɪtə/
- Alternative designations: 1909 FN

Orbital characteristics
- Epoch 31 July 2016 (JD 2457600.5)
- Uncertainty parameter 0
- Observation arc: 107.22 yr (39162 d)
- Aphelion: 3.4406 AU (514.71 Gm)
- Perihelion: 2.6948 AU (403.14 Gm)
- Semi-major axis: 3.0677 AU (458.92 Gm)
- Eccentricity: 0.12156
- Orbital period (sidereal): 5.37 yr (1962.6 d)
- Mean anomaly: 210.814°
- Mean motion: 0° 11^{m} 0.348^{s} / day
- Inclination: 12.854°
- Longitude of ascending node: 150.359°
- Argument of perihelion: 183.282°

Physical characteristics
- Mean radius: 39.995±0.7 km
- Synodic rotation period: 7.87 h (0.328 d)
- Geometric albedo: 0.0526±0.002
- Absolute magnitude (H): 9.5

676 Melitta is a minor planet orbiting the Sun. It is classified as a main belt asteroid. The name, Melitta, is the Attic Greek form of the name Melissa—a reference both to the nymph of ancient Greek mythology, and to the minor planet's discoverer, Melotte.
