= Philibert Jacques Melotte =

British astronomer

Asteroids discovered: 1
676 Melitta	16 January 1909	MPC

Philibert Jacques Melotte (29 January 1880 – 30 March 1961) was a British astronomer.

== Early life ==
Melotte was born in Camden Town, North London to Belgian parents who emigrated from Namur. His father was a lecturer. Melotte attended the Roan School in Greenwich. He entered the Royal Observatory in 1895 and passed his examination in 1902.

== Career ==
In 1908 he discovered a moon of Jupiter, today known as Pasiphae. It was simply designated "Jupiter VIII" and was not given its present name until 1975. The outer main-belt asteroid 676 Melitta, the only asteroid he discovered, is named after the Attic form of the Greek Melissa, the bee, but its resemblance to the discoverer's name is not fortuitous.

The conspicuous star cluster in the constellation Coma Berenices is commonly designated Mel 111 since it appeared in Melotte's 1915 catalogue of star clusters, but not in Charles Messier's famous catalogue of deep sky objects or in the New General Catalogue since it was not proved to be a true cluster until 1938 by the astronomer R J Trumpler.

Melotte was awarded the Jackson-Gwilt Medal of the Royal Astronomical Society in 1909. A collection of his papers is held at Cambridge University Library.

== See also ==
- Melotte catalogue
- List of astronomical catalogues
- Collinder catalogue – a similar catalogue of open star clusters published by Per Collinder in 1931
