= HD 108874 b =

Extrasolar planet in the constellation Coma Berenices

Discovery
- Discovered by: Butler et al.
- Discovery site: United States
- Discovery date: June 30, 2003
- Detection method: radial velocity

Orbital characteristics
- Semi-major axis: 1.053 ± 0.061 AU (157,500,000 ± 9,100,000 km)
- Eccentricity: 0.128 ± 0.022
- Orbital period (sidereal): 394.48 ± 0.60 d
- Time of periastron: 2,454,045 ± 49
- Argument of periastron: 219.4 ± 9.4
- Semi-amplitude: 37.3 ± 1.1
- Star: HD 108874

Physical characteristics
- Mass: >1.34 ± 0.11 M_{J}

HD 108874 b is a gas giant announced in 2003. The orbit lies in the star's habitable zone. It is expected that any moons orbiting this planet are enriched in carbon, and are thus quite different from the silicate-rich bodies in the Solar System. The planet is possibly in a 4 : 1 orbital resonance with HD 108874 c.

== Discovery ==
The jovian planet HD 108874 b was discovered by the US-based team led by Paul Butler, Geoffrey Marcy, Steven Vogt, and Debra Fischer. A total of 20 radial velocity observations, obtained at the W. M. Keck Observatory in Hawaii between 1999 and 2002, were used to make the discovery.

== See also ==
- HD 28185 b
