= HD 108863 =

Star in the constellation Coma Berenices

Observation data Epoch J2000 Equinox ICRS
- Constellation: Coma Berenices
- Right ascension: 12^{h} 30^{m} 19.9098^{s}
- Declination: +21° 56′ 53.678″
- Apparent magnitude (V): 7.71

Characteristics
- Evolutionary stage: red giant branch
- Spectral type: K0III-IV
- B−V color index: 0.99

Astrometry
Radial velocity (R_{v})	−27.93±0.12 km/s
Proper motion (μ)	RA: −75.278 mas/yr Dec.: −33.577 mas/yr
Parallax (π)	6.0246±0.0233 mas
Distance	541 ± 2 ly (166.0 ± 0.6 pc)
Absolute magnitude (M_{V})	+2.02

Orbit
Primary	HD 108863
Name	HD 108863 B
Semi-major axis (a)	0.115" (16.065 AU)

Details
Mass	1.59 M_{☉}
Radius	5.74 R_{☉}
Luminosity	24.5 L_{☉}
Surface gravity (log g)	3.07 cgs
Temperature	4,878 K
Metallicity	0.02
Rotational velocity (v sin i)	1.6±0.6 km/s
Age	1.8±0.4 Gyr

Other designations
- BD+22 2478, HD 108863, TYC 1447-2345-1, 2MASS J12301991+2156537

Database references
SIMBAD	data

HD 108863 is a giant star, the primary of a binary star system about 541 light-years away, belonging to spectral class K0. Its age is younger than the Sun's at 1.8±0.4 billion years. The primary star is slightly enriched in heavy elements, having 115% of solar abundance. The primary star does not have detectable flare activity.

In 2014, a poorly characterized co-moving stellar companion HD 108863 B, likely a main sequence star of spectral class between F6 and G4, was discovered at a projected separation of 16.065 AU.

== Planetary system ==
In 2011 one superjovian planet, HD 108863 b, on a nearly circular orbit around star HD 108863 was discovered utilizing the radial velocity method. The planet does not transit its host star.

The HD 108863 planetary system
Companion (in order from star)	Mass	Semimajor axis (AU)	Orbital period (days)	Eccentricity	Inclination (°)	Radius
b	≥2.6±0.2 M_{J}	1.40±0.03	443.4±4.2	<0.1	—	—
