= HD 106760 =

Binary star in the constellation Coma Berenices

Observation data Epoch J2000 Equinox ICRS
- Constellation: Coma Berenices
- Right ascension: 12^{h} 16^{m} 30.12328^{s}
- Declination: +33° 03′ 41.4198″
- Apparent magnitude (V): 4.99

Characteristics
- Spectral type: K0.5 III–IIIb
- B−V color index: 1.140±0.002

Astrometry
| Radial velocity (R_{v}) | −40.4±0.3 km/s |
| Proper motion (μ) | RA: −41.979 mas/yr Dec.: −105.115 mas/yr |
| Parallax (π) | 10.2417±0.2354 mas |
| Distance | 318 ± 7 ly (98 ± 2 pc) |
| Absolute magnitude (M_{V}) | 0.06 |

Orbit
| Period (P) | 3.598 years (1,314.3 d) |
| Eccentricity (e) | 0.43 |
| Longitude of the node (Ω) | 303.6° |
| Periastron epoch (T) | 2441468.5 JD |
| Semi-amplitude (K_{1}) (primary) | 6.5 km/s |

Details
| Mass | 1.85±0.14 M_{☉} |
| Radius | 16.79±0.79 R_{☉} |
| Luminosity | 112 L_{☉} |
| Surface gravity (log g) | 2.48±0.10 cgs |
| Temperature | 4,581±28 K |
| Metallicity [Fe/H] | −0.12±0.05 dex |
| Rotational velocity (v sin i) | 0.9 km/s |
| Age | 1.57±0.32 Gyr |

Other designations
- BD+33°2213, FK5 2983, HD 106760, HIP 59856, HR 4668, SAO 62928

Database references
| SIMBAD | data |

HD 106760 is a single-lined spectroscopic binary star system in the northern constellation of Coma Berenices. It is faintly visible to the naked eye, having an apparent visual magnitude of 4.99. The system is located around 318 light years away, as determined from its annual parallax shift of 10.2417 mas. It is moving closer with a heliocentric radial velocity of −40 km/s, and is expected to come as close as 259 ly in about 772,000 years.

The variable radial velocity of HD 106760 was announced by W. W. Campbell of Lick Observatory in 1922, indicating the binary nature of this system. A preliminary orbit was determined by Mount Wilson Observatory astronomer W. H. Christie in 1936, then refined by English astronomer R. F. Griffin in 1984. The components of this system orbit each other with a period of 3.6 years and an eccentricity of 0.43.

The visible component has a stellar classification of K0.5 III–IIIb, indicating it is an evolved K-type giant star. It is around 1.6 billion years old with 1.9 times the mass of the Sun and has expanded to 17 times the Sun's radius. The star is radiating 112 times the Sun's luminosity from its enlarged photosphere at an effective temperature of 4,581 K.
