= HD 111395 =

Star in the constellation Coma Berenices

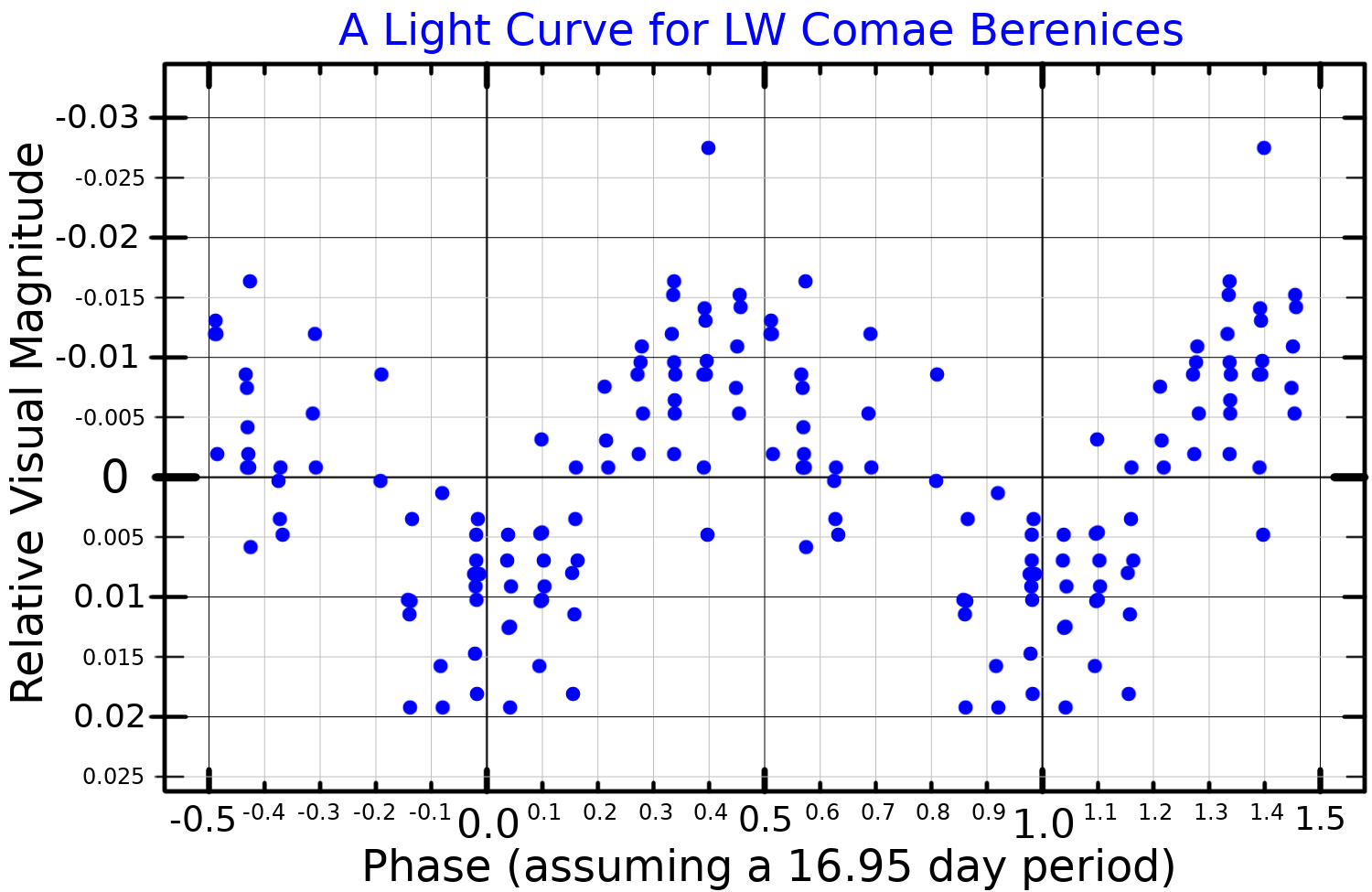
- A visual band light curve for LW Comae Berenices, adapted from Strassmeier et al. (1997)

Observation data Epoch J2000 Equinox ICRS
- Constellation: Coma Berenices
- Right ascension: 12^{h} 48^{m} 47.048^{s}
- Declination: +24° 50′ 24.82″
- Apparent magnitude (V): 6.29

Characteristics
- Evolutionary stage: main sequence
- Spectral type: G7V
- B−V color index: 0.703±0.002
- Variable type: BY Dra

Astrometry
Radial velocity (R_{v})	−8.936±0.0064 km/s
Proper motion (μ)	RA: −334.908 mas/yr Dec.: −105.517 mas/yr
Parallax (π)	58.4858±0.0293 mas
Distance	55.77 ± 0.03 ly (17.098 ± 0.009 pc)
Absolute magnitude (M_{V})	5.15

Details
Mass	1.08±0.04 M_{☉}
Radius	0.93±0.01 R_{☉}
Luminosity	0.799±0.001 L_{☉}
Surface gravity (log g)	4.543±0.05 cgs
Temperature	5,649+38 −17 K
Metallicity [Fe/H]	0.08±0.02 dex
Rotational velocity (v sin i)	3.8±0.8 km/s
Age	1.0 or 1.01−1.73 Gyr

Other designations
- LW Com, BD+25°2568, FK5 3021, GJ 486.1, HD 111395, HIP 62523, HR 4864, SAO 82511

Database references
SIMBAD	data

HD 111395 is a single, variable star in the northern constellation of Coma Berenices. It has the variable star designation LW Comae Berenices; HD 111395 is the Henry Draper Catalogue designation. The star has a yellow hue and is just bright enough to be barely visible to the naked eye with an apparent visual magnitude that fluctuates around 6.29. Based upon parallax measurements, it is located at a distance of 55.8 light years from the Sun. The star is drifting closer with a radial velocity of −8.9 km/s. It is a member of the Eta Chamaeleontis stellar kinematic group.

This object is a G-type main-sequence star with a stellar classification of G7V. Klaus G. Strassmeier et al. announced their discovery that HD 111395 is a variable star, in 1997. It was given its variable star designation in 2006. It is a BY Draconis variable that varies in brightness by about 0.10 magnitude over a period of 15.8 days, which is interpreted as the rotation period of the star. (Messina et al. (2003) suspect the actual rotation period may be half that: 7.9 days.) It has an active chromosphere and is a source for X-ray emission.

The star is around a billion years old with a projected rotational velocity of 3.8 km/s. It has slightly above solar metallicity − the term astronomers use for the relative abundance of elements other than hydrogen and helium. The mass of the star is 8% greater than the Sun, but it has 93% of the Sun's radius. It is radiating 80% of the luminosity of the Sun from its photosphere at an effective temperature of 5649 K. An infrared excess indicates a cold debris disk is orbiting the star at a distance of 17.48 AU with a mean temperature of 60 K. The disk has an estimated mass of 5.86×10^{−6} M_{🜨}.
