= HD 108874 =

G-type star in the constellation Coma Berenices

- Orbits around the star HD108874

Observation data Epoch J2000 Equinox ICRS
- Constellation: Coma Berenices
- Right ascension: 12^{h} 30^{m} 26.882^{s}
- Declination: +22° 52′ 47.38″
- Apparent magnitude (V): 8.76

Characteristics
- Spectral type: G5 V or G9 V
- B−V color index: 0.738±0.018

Astrometry
| Radial velocity (R_{v}) | −30.052±0.0028 km/s |
| Proper motion (μ) | RA: 127.469 mas/yr Dec.: −89.912 mas/yr |
| Parallax (π) | 16.7730±0.0443 mas |
| Distance | 194.5 ± 0.5 ly (59.6 ± 0.2 pc) |
| Absolute magnitude (M_{V}) | 4.79 |

Details
| Mass | 0.996±0.032 M_{☉} |
| Radius | 1.062±0.070 R_{☉} |
| Luminosity | 1.19 L_{☉} |
| Surface gravity (log g) | 4.39± cgs |
| Temperature | 5,585±20 K |
| Metallicity [Fe/H] | 0.18 dex |
| Rotation | 40.20±0.15 days |
| Rotational velocity (v sin i) | 1.36±0.26 km/s |
| Age | 6.48±3.47 Gyr |

Other designations
- BD+23°2466, HD 108874, HIP 61028, SAO 82344, PPM 101950

Database references
| SIMBAD | data |
| Exoplanet Archive | data |

HD 108874 is a star with a pair of orbiting exoplanets in the northern constellation of Coma Berenices. It is located 194.5 light years from the Sun based on parallax measurements, but is drifting closer with a radial velocity of −30 km/s. The absolute magnitude of this star is 4.79, but at that distance the star has an apparent visual magnitude of 8.76, making it too faint to be visible to the naked eye. HD 108874 has a relatively large proper motion, traversing the celestial sphere at an angular rate of 0.157″ yr^{−1}.

The spectrum of HD 108874 presents as a G-type main-sequence star with a stellar classification of G5 V. (An alternate source gives a class of G9 V.) It is probably billions of years older than the Sun although the age is not well constrained. The level of magnetic activity in the chromosphere is lower than in the Sun and it is spinning with a low rotation period of 40 days. The star has about the same mass as the Sun, but the radius is 6% larger. The abundance of iron, an indicator of the star's metallicity, is 1.18 times that of the Sun. The star is radiating 1.19 times the luminosity of the Sun from its photosphere at an effective temperature of about 5600 K.

== Planetary system ==
In 2003, the jovian planet HD 108874 b was discovered by the US-based team led by Paul Butler, Geoffrey Marcy, Steven Vogt, and Debra Fischer. A total of 20 radial velocity observations, obtained at the W. M. Keck Observatory between 1999 and 2002, were used to make the discovery. In 2005, further observations revealed this star has another jovian planet orbiting further out, designated as HD 108874 c. The orbital parameters of both planets were updated in 2009 with additional observations. There is an additional radial velocity signal in the data at a period of 40 days however this likely caused by the stellar rotation period.

Those two planets are near, and possibly in a 9:2 orbital resonance. This means if HD 108874 b orbits the star nine times, then HD 108874 c orbits twice, because the orbital period for planet c is four and a half times longer than planet b.

The HD 108874 planetary system
| Companion (in order from star) | Mass | Semimajor axis (AU) | Orbital period (days) | Eccentricity | Inclination (°) | Radius |
|---|---|---|---|---|---|---|
| b | >1.25±0.10 M_{J} | 1.05±0.02 | 395.34±0.19 | 0.142±0.011 | — | — |
| c | >1.09±0.16 M_{J} | 2.81±0.06 | 1732.2±9.8 | 0.229±0.032 | — | — |

== See also ==
- List of extrasolar planets
