= HD 108874 c =

Extrasolar planet in the constellation Coma Berenices

Discovery
- Discovered by: Vogt et al.
- Discovery site: California, United States
- Discovery date: June 24, 2005
- Detection method: radial velocity

Orbital characteristics
- Semi-major axis: 2.77 ± 0.16 AU (414,000,000 ± 24,000,000 km)
- Eccentricity: 0.273 ± 0.040
- Orbital period (sidereal): 1680 ± 24 d
- Time of periastron: 2,452,797 ± 49
- Argument of periastron: 10 ± 11
- Semi-amplitude: 18.90 ± 0.72
- Star: HD 108874

Physical characteristics
- Mass: >1.064 ± 0.099 M_{J}

HD 108874 c is a gas giant discovered in 2005 which orbits beyond the star's habitable zone, and receives insolation 15.9% that of Earth. It has minimum mass similar to Jupiter, although since the inclination of the orbit is not known the true mass of this planet could be much greater. The planet is possibly in a 4 : 1 orbital resonance with HD 108874 b.
