= HD 116029 =

Binary star system in the constellation of Coma Berenices

Observation data Epoch J2000 Equinox ICRS
- Constellation: Coma Berenices
- Right ascension: 13^{h} 20^{m} 39.5420^{s}
- Declination: +24° 38′ 55.311″
- Apparent magnitude (V): 7.89

Characteristics
- Evolutionary stage: red giant branch
- Spectral type: K1IV+M
- B−V color index: 1.009

Astrometry
Radial velocity (R_{v})	−6.74±0.12 km/s
Proper motion (μ)	RA: −14.322 mas/yr Dec.: −52.252 mas/yr
Parallax (π)	8.0853±0.0384 mas
Distance	403 ± 2 ly (123.7 ± 0.6 pc)
Absolute magnitude (M_{V})	+2.44

Orbit
Primary	HD 116029 A
Name	HD 116029 B
Semi-major axis (a)	1.392" (171 AU)

Details

HD 116029 A
Mass	1.445±0.094 M_{☉}
Radius	4.6±0.1 R_{☉}
Luminosity	11.7 L_{☉}
Surface gravity (log g)	3.40±0.06 cgs
Temperature	4894±36 K
Metallicity	0.12 ± 0.02
Rotational velocity (v sin i)	1.0±0.6 km/s
Age	2.7±0.5 Gyr

HD 116029 B
Mass	0.26 M_{☉}
Surface gravity (log g)	5.033±0.019 cgs

Other designations
- BD+25 26232, HD 116029, HIP 65117, TYC 1994-2335-1, 2MASS J13203954+2438555

Database references
SIMBAD	data

HD 116029 is a binary star system about 400 light-years away.

The primary subgiant star HD 116029 A belongs to the spectral class K1. Its age is younger than the Sun`s at 2.7±0.5 billion years. The primary star is slightly enriched by heavy elements, having 130% of solar abundance. The primary star does not have detectable flare activity.

In 2016 the co-moving binary stellar companion HD 116029 B was detected. It is a red dwarf star of visual magnitude 16. The companion was confirmed orbiting the primary at a projected separation of 171 AU in 2017.

== Planetary system ==
In 2011 one superjovian planet, HD 116029 b, on a mildly eccentric orbit around star HD 116029 A was discovered utilizing the radial velocity method. One more planet on a wider orbit was detected in 2016. The planets b and c are orbiting in a 2:3 orbital resonance.

The HD 116029 planetary system
Companion (in order from star)	Mass	Semimajor axis (AU)	Orbital period (days)	Eccentricity	Inclination (°)	Radius
HD 116029 A b	≥2.1±0.2 M_{J}	1.73±0.04	670.2±8.3	<0.21	—	—
HD 116029 A c	≥1.27±0.1 M_{J}	—	907±30	0.038^{+0.127}_{−0.038}	—	—
