= HD 110067 =

Star in the constellation Coma Berenices

Observation data Epoch J2000 Equinox ICRS
- Constellation: Coma Berenices
- Right ascension: 12^{h} 39^{m} 21.50369^{s}
- Declination: +20° 01′ 40.0360″
- Apparent magnitude (V): 8.43

Characteristics
- Evolutionary stage: Main sequence
- Spectral type: K0V

Astrometry
Radial velocity (R_{v})	−8.56±0.13 km/s
Proper motion (μ)	RA: −81.703 mas/yr Dec.: −104.532 mas/yr
Parallax (π)	31.0369±0.0222 mas
Distance	105.09 ± 0.08 ly (32.22 ± 0.02 pc)
Absolute magnitude (M_{V})	+5.96

Details
Mass	0.798±0.042 M_{☉}
Radius	0.788±0.008 R_{☉}
Luminosity	0.408 L_{☉}
Surface gravity (log g)	4.54±0.03 cgs
Temperature	5266±64 K
Metallicity [Fe/H]	−0.20±0.04 dex
Rotational velocity (v sin i)	2.5±1.0 km/s
Age	8.1±4.0 Gyr

Other designations
- BD+20 2748, HD 110067, SAO 82424, TOI-1835, TIC 347332255, TYC 1448-433-1

Database references
SIMBAD	data
Exoplanet Archive	data

HD 110067 is a K-type main-sequence star with six known sub-Neptune exoplanets (b, c, d, e, f, g) with radii ranging from 1.94 R_{🜨} to 2.85 R_{🜨}. The planets orbit the host star in a rhythmic orbital resonance. The star, and related planetary system, is located 105 light-years away in the constellation Coma Berenices.

HD 110067 is part of a wide triple star system, along with the spectroscopic binary system HD 110106.

== Description ==
HD 110067, located 105 light-years away in the constellation Coma Berenices, is orbited by six known sub-Neptune exoplanets (b, c, d, e, f, g) with radii ranging from 1.94 R_{🜨} to 2.85 R_{🜨}, and with densities (and solid cores) similar to that of gas giants in the Solar System. None of the planets in the planetary system were found to be in the habitable zone for life as we know it.

== Discovery ==
The two innermost exoplanets orbiting HD 110067, a bright star, were first detected by the TESS (NASA) space telescope, using the transit method, in 2020. The remaining four exoplanets were later confirmed in 2023 as a result of additional observations using the CHEOPS (European Space Agency) space telescope.

== Scientific importance ==
On 29 November 2023, an international team of astronomers, led by Rafael Luque, astronomer from the University of Chicago, published a review of the discovery in the journal Nature entitled, "A resonant sextuplet of sub-Neptunes transiting the bright star HD 110067". According to Luque, "It’s like looking at a fossil: The orbits of the planets today are the same as they were a billion years ago."

Further study of the HD 110067 planetary system may provide a better understanding of how the pattern of the planetary orbits in the Solar System arose, which once may have begun harmoniously, but later turned chaotic. The result, possibly, of a passing star or planet or some other astronomical object capable of disrupting the nascent harmonic orbital dynamics. Additionally, further studies of the system, including compositional studies of the planetary interiors and atmospheres, may also provide a better understanding of the conditions that potentially may support life.

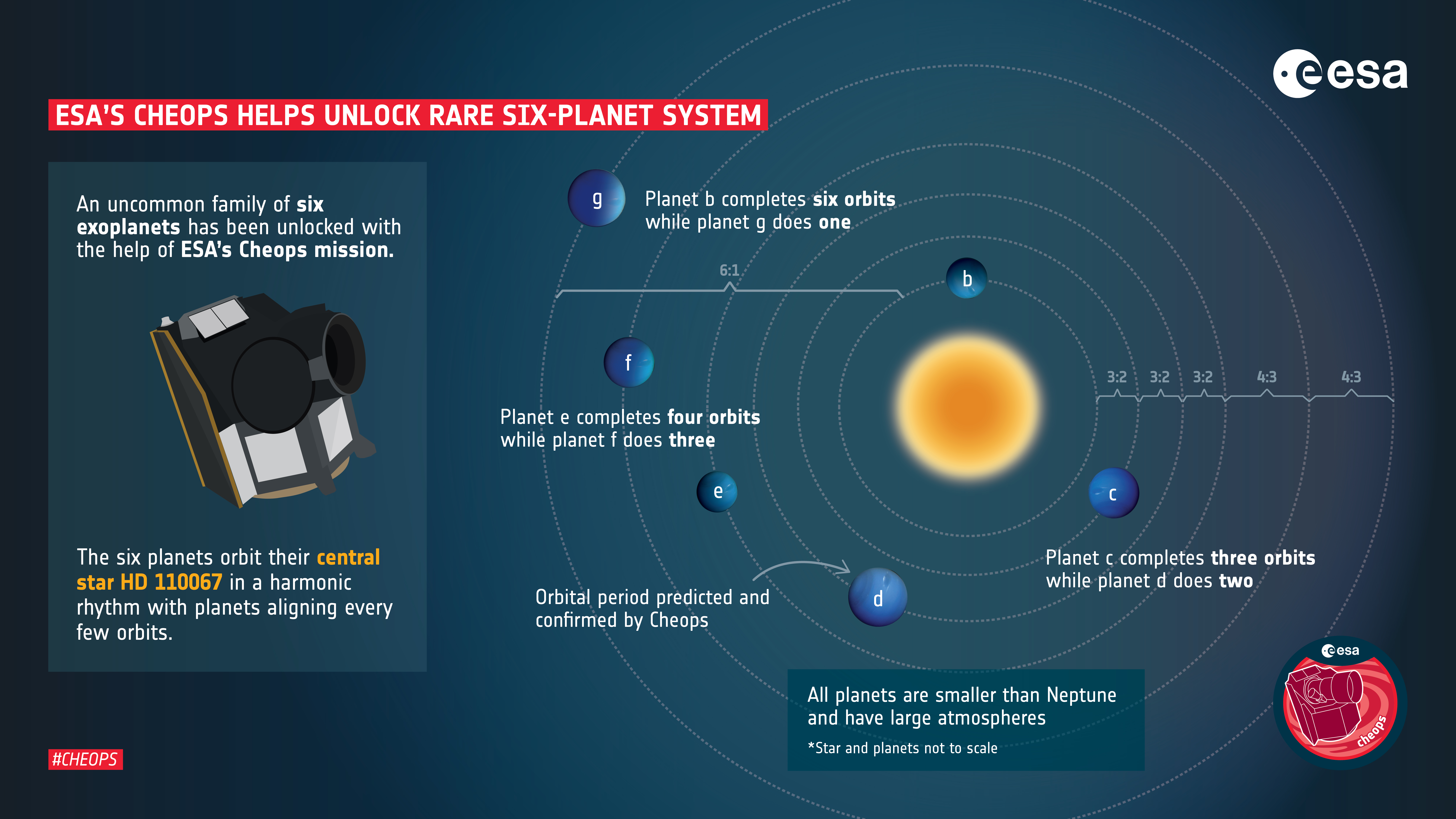
The six planets in the HD 110067 system are all smaller than Neptune, and revolve around their parent star in a very precise waltz: When the closest planet to the star makes three full revolutions around it, the second one makes exactly two during the same time; this is called a 3:2 resonance; the six planets form a resonant chain in pairs of 3:2, 3:2, 3:2, 4:3, and 4:3, resulting in the closest planet completing six orbits while the outer-most planet does one.

== Planetary system ==
All known sub-Neptune planets (b, c, d, e, f, g) with radii ranging from 1.94 R_{🜨} to 2.85 R_{🜨} in order from the host star HD 110067. All planets are smaller than Neptune and have substantial atmospheres. The star and related planetary system are located 105 light years away, in the constellation Coma Berenices. Masses of all planets in the system range from 3.9 M_{🜨} to 8.5 M_{🜨}. All planets with orbits in the HD 110067 system are closer to their star than distance between the planet Mercury and the Sun.

The planets orbit the host star in synchronized rhythms of orbital resonance (a rare 1 percent of such systems in the Milky Way galaxy have this symmetry): the innermost planet orbits three times for every two times for the next planet out – a so-called 3:2 resonance; this same 3:2 resonance also applies to the second and third planet, as well as to the third and fourth planet; whereas the fourth planet orbits four times for every three times for the fifth planet out – in a so-called 4:3 resonance; additionally, the penultimate fifth planet orbits the sixth planet out in this same 4:3 resonance. Further, the innermost planet completes six orbits in exactly the same time the outermost planet completes one orbit. The resonance ratio for the entire system is 54:36:24:16:12:9.

The HD 110067 planetary system
Companion (in order from star)	Mass	Semimajor axis (AU)	Orbital period (days)	Eccentricity	Inclination (°)	Radius
b	5.69+1.78 −1.82 M_{🜨}	0.0793±0.00096	9.113678(10)	—	89.061±0.099	2.200±0.030 R_{🜨}
c	< 6.3 M_{🜨}	0.1039±0.0013	13.673694(24)	—	89.687±0.163	2.388±0.036 R_{🜨}
d	8.52+3.31 −3.25 M_{🜨}	0.1362±0.0017	20.519617(40)	—	89.248±0.046	2.852±0.039 R_{🜨}
e	< 3.9 M_{🜨}	0.1785±0.0022	30.793091(12)	—	89.867±0.089	1.940±0.040 R_{🜨}
f	5.04+1.89 −1.94 M_{🜨}	0.2163±0.0026	41.05854(10)	—	89.673±0.046	2.601±0.042 R_{🜨}
g	< 8.4 M_{🜨}	0.2621±0.0032	54.76992(20)	—	89.729±0.073	2.607±0.052 R_{🜨}

== See also ==
- HD 10180 – star with six known planets
- Kepler-11 – star with six known planets
- LHS 1140 – star with a system of planets having an atmosphere
- List of potentially habitable exoplanets
- LP 890-9 – second known coolest star with planets
- Tabby's Star – star with notable transit data
- TRAPPIST-1 – star with a resonant chain of Earth-sized planets
