= LoTr 5 =

Planetary nebula in the constellation Coma Berenices

Emission nebula
- Planetary nebula
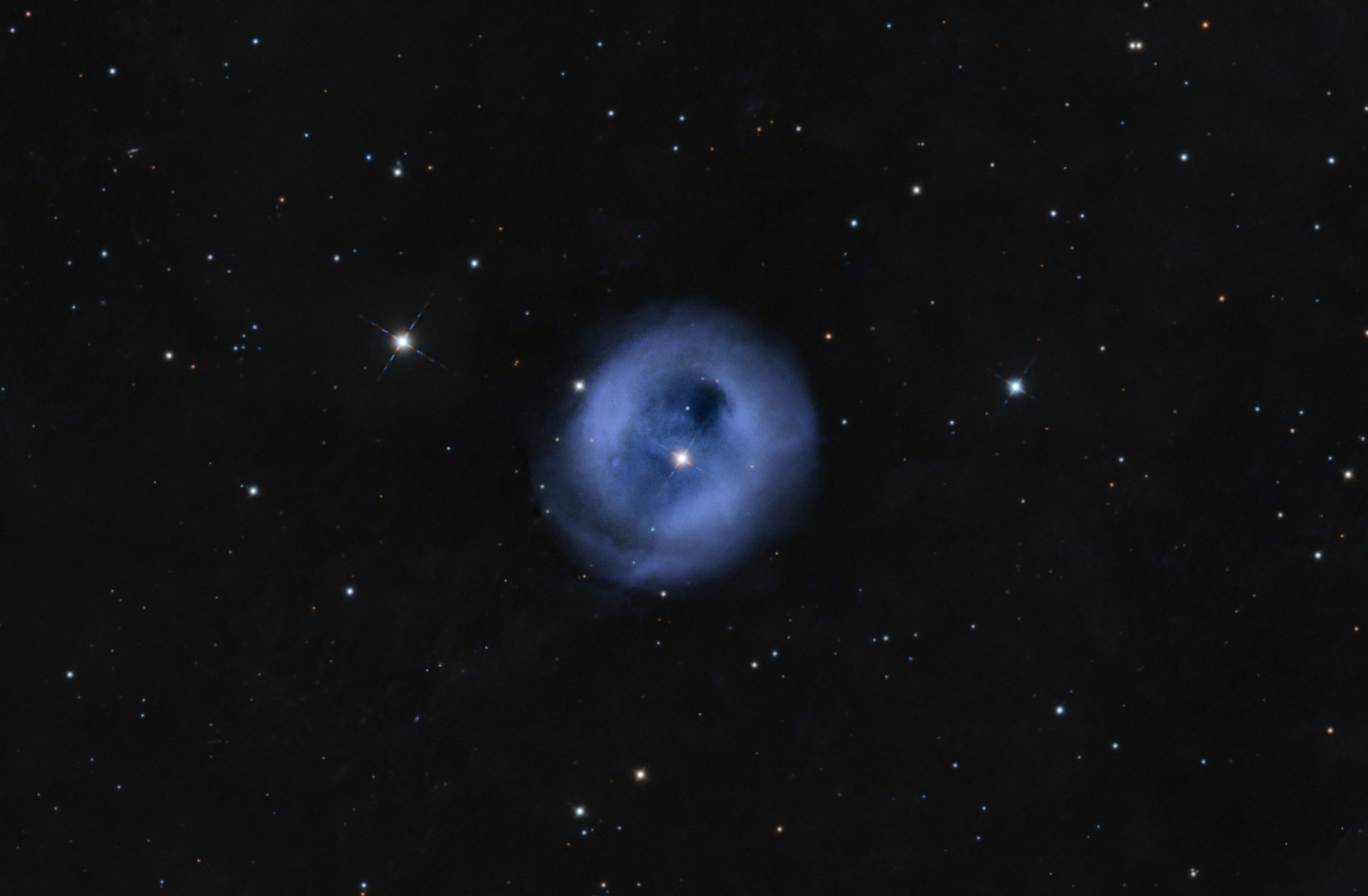
- LoTr 5 taken by Hunter Outten (Outten Astrophotography)

Observation data: J2000 epoch
- Right ascension: 12^{h} 55^{m} 33.7462^{s}
- Declination: +25° 53′ 30.561″
- Distance: 1,650 ± 39 ly (506 ± 12 pc)
- Apparent diameter: ~500″
- Constellation: Coma Berenices

Physical characteristics
- Radius: 1.8 ly (0.55 pc)
- Designations: PN G339.9+88.4

LoTr 5 is a large, faint planetary nebula in the constellation of Coma Berenices. In 2018, its parallax was measured by Gaia, giving a distance of about 1,650 light-years (510 parsecs).

As of 2018, LoTr 5 has the highest galactic latitude of any known planetary nebula, being only 1.5 degrees away from the galactic north pole. Scientists noted this because if the distance of the nebula were found to be greater than a few hundred parsecs, then the gas from the nebula would be expanding into the galactic halo, where there is little interaction with the interstellar medium.

== Nomenclature ==
The nebula is most commonly referred to as LoTr 5, short for Longmore-Tritton 5. It was discovered in 1980 by A. J. Longmore and S. B. Tritton, who found the nebula on photographic plates taken at the UK Schmidt Telescope.

The central star has a number of different names. It is often referred to by its Henry Draper Catalogue designation HD 112313, or by its variable star designation IN Comae Berenices. The General Catalogue of Variable Stars describes it as R:/PN, meaning it is likely a close binary star system with reflection of starlight being the cause of variation, as well as being part of the nucleus of a planetary nebula.

== Structure ==
LoTr 5 is one of the largest planetary nebulae known, with a radius of 1.8 light-years (0.55 parsecs). It mostly emits light at a wavelength of 500.7 nm, corresponding to a doubly ionized oxygen line.

LoTr 5 is not spherical, but is instead a bipolar nebula. Many bipolar and non-spherical nebulae are known to exist, but it is the processes that cause planetary nebulae to get their shapes are not clear, and have been the subject of much debate. However, the "binary hypothesis" posits that binary stars are more likely to produce non-spherical nebulae. For LoTr 5, the binary system likely played a role in shaping the nebula.

A modelling of LoTr 5 shows that it is composed of two round lobes, making a peanut shape. The semimajor and semiminor axes are about 390 arcsec and 100 arcsec, respectively. The position angle of the long axis is 55°. The long axis is tilted 17° away from the line of sight, so there is considerable overlap between the farther northeastern lobe and the closer southwestern lobe. The nebula is not perfectly symmetrical: there appears to be a "hole" east of the nucleus, while the western side has an "arc" of emission.

== Binary system ==
IN Comae Berenices
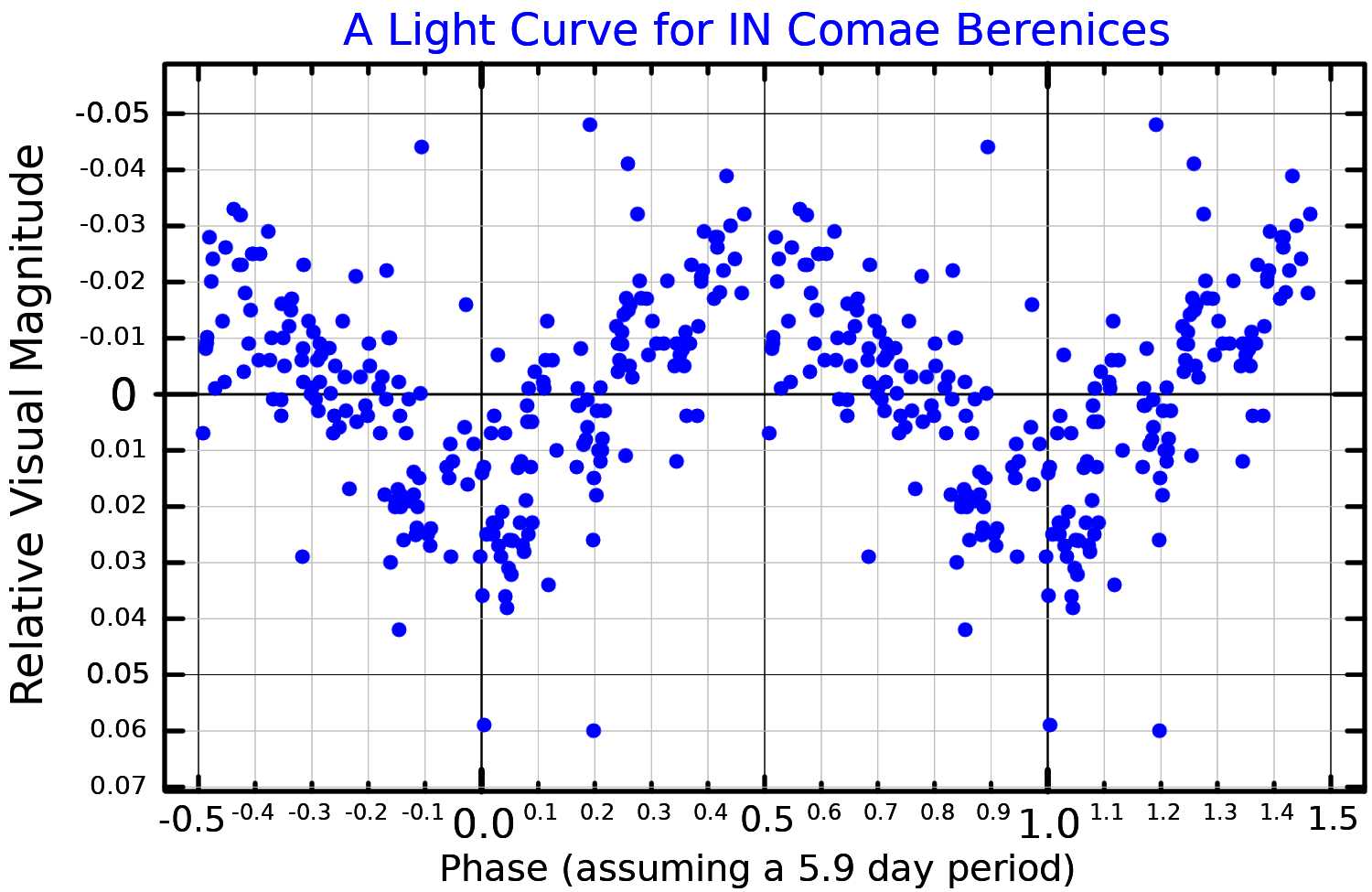
- A visual band light curve for IN Comae Berenices, adapted from Strassmeier et al. (1999)

Observation data Epoch J2000 Equinox ICRS
- Constellation: Coma Berenices
- Right ascension: 12^{h} 55^{m} 33.7462^{s}
- Declination: +25° 53′ 30.561″
- Apparent magnitude (V): 8.69

Characteristics
- Spectral type: G5 III + sdO
- U−B color index: +0.31
- B−V color index: +0.81
- V−R color index: +0.73

Astrometry
Radial velocity (R_{v})	−16.50 ± 0.2 km/s
Proper motion (μ)	RA: −25.588 mas/yr Dec.: 4.783 mas/yr
Parallax (π)	1.9768±0.0462 mas
Distance	1,650 ± 40 ly (510 ± 10 pc)
Absolute bolometric magnitude (M_{bol})	0.01 ± 0.08

Orbit
Period (P)	2689 ± 52
Eccentricity (e)	0.249 ± 0.018
Periastron epoch (T)	2455944 ± 25
Argument of periastron (ω) (secondary)	259.9 ± 4.8°
Semi-amplitude (K_{1}) (primary)	4.630 ± 0.084 km/s

Details
Mass	1.8 ± 0.4 M_{☉}
Radius	11.1+5.0 −2.2 R_{☉}
Luminosity	78 ± 6 L_{☉}
Surface gravity (log g)	2.6 ± 0.1 cgs
Temperature	5400 ± 100 K
Metallicity [Fe/H]	−0.10 ± 0.05 dex
Rotation	5.973 ± 0.008 d
Rotational velocity (v sin i)	67.0 ± 1.5 km/s

Other designations
- BD+26 2405, HD 112313, HIP 63087, SAO 82570

Database references
SIMBAD	data

The central system at LoTr 5 has been known to be binary since 1983. At the center there is an evolved G-type star (IN Comae Berenices) that is often classified as a giant star or a subgiant, as well as a hot O-type subdwarf or white dwarf that is responsible for ionizing the nebula. The subdwarf is one of the hottest stars known, with an effective temperature of about 150,000 K.

The two stars orbit each very slowly; in fact, with an orbital period of 2,689 ± 52 days (7.36 ± 0.14 a), this is one of the longest periods for a binary system within a planetary nebula. The orbit is also moderately eccentric, at 0.249 ± 0.018. For a long time the hierarchical structure of the system has not been clear. Earlier studies came up with inner orbits around IN Comae Berenices with periods of 1.95 days or 1.75 days, and/or suggesting a third star orbiting the central G-type star. The central stars' orbit appears to have a discrepancy with the nebula's "waist" such that the nebula's inclination of 17° may be too low. It is also possible, but more unlikely that the stellar orbits are not coplanar with the nebula's "waist", or that there is an undiscovered object in a close orbit with the degenerate star.

IN Comae Berenices is known to be a variable star, with its brightness varying on a cycle that is about 5.9 days long. This corresponds to the rotation period of the star, and the variability is attributed to starspots, making it an RS Canum Venaticorum variable. With Doppler imaging, the starspots were found to be lying at middle latitudes (40–50°), covering 22% of the star's surface, and about 600 K cooler than the rest of the star's surface. Its spectrum shows it to be rich in barium and other s-process elements, making it a barium star.

IN Comae Berenices emits X-rays. These X-rays likely come from the star's corona, and are associated with the star's rapid rotation.

In terms of structure, LoTr 5 is very similar to Abell 35, another planetary nebula. Both are large and faint planetary nebulae with a binary nucleus, consisting of a rapidly rotating G-type star that is a rotational variable.
