= 24 Comae Berenices =

Star in the constellation Coma Berenices

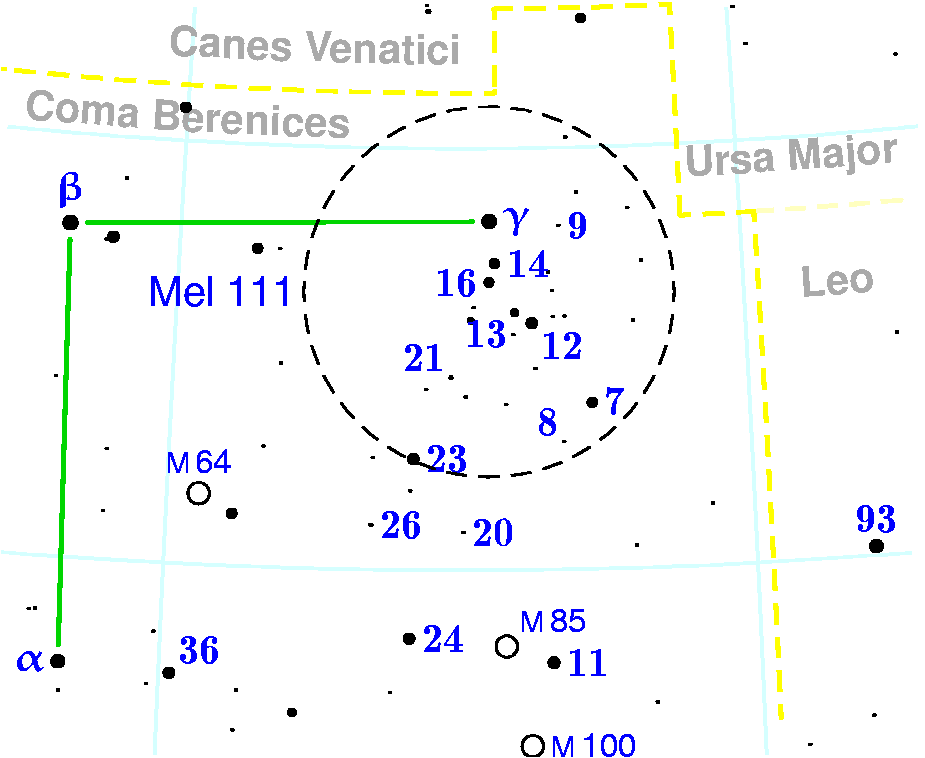
- Map showing location of 24 Comae Berenices

Observation data Epoch J2000.0 Equinox ICRS
- Constellation: Coma Berenices
- A
- Right ascension: 12^{h} 35^{m} 07.76130^{s}
- Declination: +18° 22′ 37.4133″
- Apparent magnitude (V): 5.03
- B
- Right ascension: 12^{h} 35^{m} 06.34558^{s}
- Declination: +18° 22′ 37.5320″
- Apparent magnitude (V): 6.57

Characteristics

A
- Spectral type: K0II-III
- B−V color index: 1.152±0.018

B
- Evolutionary stage: A9V
- B−V color index: 0.265±0.015

Astrometry

A
Radial velocity (R_{v})	+3.03±0.10 km/s
Proper motion (μ)	RA: −3.719 mas/yr Dec.: +23.106 mas/yr
Parallax (π)	8.5745±0.1996 mas
Distance	380 ± 9 ly (117 ± 3 pc)
Absolute magnitude (M_{V})	0.30

B
Radial velocity (R_{v})	+4.90±0.50 km/s
Proper motion (μ)	RA: −2.320 mas/yr Dec.: +21.236 mas/yr
Parallax (π)	8.8346±0.0695 mas
Distance	369 ± 3 ly (113.2 ± 0.9 pc)

Orbit
Primary	Ba
Name	Bb
Period (P)	7.336673±0.000087 d
Semi-major axis (a)	1.007±0.037 mas
Eccentricity (e)	0.2585±0.0012
Inclination (i)	61.40±3.89°
Longitude of the node (Ω)	136.17±2.86°
Periastron epoch (T)	2,459,361.967±0.011 JD
Argument of periastron (ω) (primary)	302.33±0.28°
Semi-amplitude (K_{1}) (primary)	68.16±0.09 km/s
Semi-amplitude (K_{2}) (secondary)	81.28±0.20 km/s

Details

A
Mass	4.40 M_{☉}
Radius	19.95+0.69 −2.58 R_{☉}
Luminosity	173.3±4.6 L_{☉}
Surface gravity (log g)	2.50 cgs
Temperature	4,688+337 −79 K
Metallicity [Fe/H]	−0.09 dex

Ba
Mass	1.838±0.218 M_{☉}
Radius	2.28±0.06 R_{☉}
Luminosity	15.6±1.3 L_{☉}
Surface gravity (log g)	3.86±0.01 cgs
Temperature	7,630±120 K
Metallicity [Fe/H]	0.54 dex
Rotational velocity (v sin i)	14.5±1.5 km/s

Bb
Mass	1.541±0.184 M_{☉}
Radius	1.70±0.07 R_{☉}
Luminosity	7.2±0.9 L_{☉}
Surface gravity (log g)	4.09±0.02 cgs
Temperature	7,180±140 K
Metallicity [Fe/H]	0.54 dex
Rotational velocity (v sin i)	14.2±1.1 km/s

Other designations
- 24 Com, BD+19°2584, FK5 473, WDS 02338-2814
- A: NSV 5748, GC 17147, HD 109511, HIP 61418, HR 4792, SAO 100160
- B: GC 17146, HD 109510, HIP 61415, HR 4791, SAO 100159

Database references
SIMBAD	A
- B

24 Comae Berenices is a triple star system in the northern constellation of Coma Berenices. It is visible to the naked eye, with the brightest component being an orange-hued star with an apparent visual magnitude of 5.03. The system is located at a distance of approximately 369 light-years from the Sun based on parallax, and is drifting further away with radial velocities of 3–5 km/s.

This system can be resolved in a telescope as a pair of stars with an angular separation of 20.2″ along a position angle of 272°, as of 2018. They share a common motion through space and thus appear to be physically associated, with a wide projected separation of 1,400 AU or greater. If they are bound in an orbit, the estimated period is approximately 28,000 years.

The brighter member of this system is an aging giant or bright giant star with a stellar classification of K0II-III. It has exhausted the supply of hydrogen at its core and expanded to 20 times the girth of the Sun. This is a suspected variable that has been recorded ranging in brightness from magnitude 4.98 down to 5.06. The star is radiating 173 times the luminosity of the Sun from its swollen photosphere at an effective temperature of 4,688 K.

The fainter component at magnitude 6.57 is a double-lined spectroscopic binary with an orbital period of 7.33 days and an eccentricity of 0.26. The primary member of this pair is an A-type main-sequence star with a stellar classification of A9V. It is a metallic-lined Am star with 2.2 times the radius of the Sun. The stars radiate about 16 and 7 times the Sun's luminosity from its photosphere, respectively, at effective temperatures of 7,630 and 7180 K, respectively. Both have relatively low projected rotational velocity of around 14 km/s, and it is suspected the rotations of this binary system may be synchronized. The system is a source for X-ray emission, which is most likely coming from the secondary.
