= 14 Comae Berenices =

Star in the constellation Coma Berenices

- Location of 14 Com (circled)

Observation data Epoch J2000 Equinox ICRS
- Constellation: Coma Berenices
- Right ascension: 12^{h} 26^{m} 24.06442^{s}
- Declination: +27° 16′ 05.6598″
- Apparent magnitude (V): 4.95

Characteristics
- Evolutionary stage: subgiant
- Spectral type: F0p
- U−B color index: +0.18
- B−V color index: +0.277±0.018

Astrometry
Radial velocity (R_{v})	−2.20 km/s
Proper motion (μ)	RA: −15.874 mas/yr Dec.: −11.784 mas/yr
Parallax (π)	11.2826±0.1085 mas
Distance	289 ± 3 ly (88.6 ± 0.9 pc)
Absolute magnitude (M_{V})	+0.35

Details
Mass	1.6 M_{☉}
Radius	4.8 R_{☉}
Luminosity	56 L_{☉}
Surface gravity (log g)	3.27 cgs
Temperature	7,170 K
Rotation	1.272 days
Rotational velocity (v sin i)	226 km/s
Age	500 Myr

Other designations
- 14 Com, AAVSO 1221+27, BD+28°2115, FK5 2997, HD 108283, HIP 60697, HR 4733, SAO 82310

Database references
SIMBAD	data

14 Comae Berenices is a single star in the northern constellation of Coma Berenices, and is the second brightest member of the Coma Star Cluster. It is a faint star but visible to the naked eye with an apparent visual magnitude of 4.95. Parallax measurements place the star at a distance of about 289 light years.

The spectrum of this star is peculiar and it has been assigned a number of different stellar classifications: A5, F0p, F0 III Sr, F0 vp, F1 IV: np Sr shell, A9 IV np Sr II, F1 IV, and A9 V + shell. Abt & Morrell (1995) designated this a Lambda Boötis star but this was later refuted. No surface magnetic field has been detected on 14 Comae Berenices.

14 Comae Berenices is a well-known shell star with a high rate of spin, showing a projected rotational velocity of 226 km/s. This is giving the star an oblate shape with an equatorial bulge that is 12% larger than the polar radius. It is radiating 56 times the Sun's luminosity from its photosphere at an effective temperature of 7,170 K.
