= 11 Comae Berenices =

Binary star system in the constellation Coma Berenices

- Location of 11 Comae Berenices (circled)

Observation data Epoch J2000 Equinox ICRS
- Constellation: Coma Berenices
- Right ascension: 12^{h} 20^{m} 43.02577^{s}
- Declination: +17° 47′ 34.3275″
- Apparent magnitude (V): 4.72 (4.89 + 12.9)

Characteristics
- Evolutionary stage: red giant branch
- Spectral type: K0 III or G8+ III Fe-1
- B−V color index: 1.010±0.001

Astrometry
Radial velocity (R_{v})	43.6±0.2 km/s
Proper motion (μ)	RA: −109.426 mas/yr Dec.: +88.930 mas/yr
Parallax (π)	10.1677±0.1265 mas
Distance	321 ± 4 ly (98 ± 1 pc)
Absolute magnitude (M_{V})	−0.02

Details
Mass	1.66±0.21 M_{☉}
Radius	15.8±0.3 R_{☉}
Luminosity	110±4 L_{☉}
Surface gravity (log g)	2.38±0.06 cgs
Temperature	4,670±10 K
Metallicity [Fe/H]	−0.51±0.02 dex
Age	1.53±0.54 Gyr

Other designations
- 11 Com, BD+18 2592, FK5 2987, HD 107383, HIP 60202, HR 4697, SAO 100053, WDS J12207+1748

Database references
SIMBAD	data

11 Comae Berenices is a binary star system in the northern constellation of Coma Berenices, located in the sky, east and slightly north of Denebola in Leo, but not nearly as far east as ε Virginis in Virgo. It is about a degree from the elliptical galaxy M85 and two degrees north of the spiral galaxy M100. Based upon an annual parallax shift of 10.7104 mas, the star is located 305 light years away from the Sun. It is visible to the naked eye as a faint, orange-hued star with an apparent visual magnitude of 4.72. This body is moving away from the Sun with a heliocentric radial velocity of +44 km/s.

The primary component is an aging K-type giant star with a stellar classification of K0 III. It is a low metallicity star with an iron abundance about half that of the Sun. Keenan and McNeil (1989) found a class of G8+ III Fe-1, showing an underabundance of iron in the spectrum. At the age of 1.5 billion years old with 1.7 times the mass of the Sun, it has exhausted the hydrogen at its core and expanded to 15.8 times the Sun's radius. The star is radiating 110 times the luminosity of the Sun from its swollen photosphere at an effective temperature of 4,670 K. It has a magnitude 12.9 companion star at an angular separation of 8.8″ along a position angle of 44°, as of 2007.

== Planetary system ==
A substellar companion was discovered orbiting the primary star in 2007 using the radial velocity method. It has a period of 326 days with minimum mass of about 19.4 Jupiter masses and is orbiting around 1.3 AU from the host star with an eccentricity of 0.23. The object's mass is well within the range of deuterium-fusing brown dwarfs.

The 11 Comae Berenices system
Companion	Mass	Semimajor axis (AU)	Orbital period	Eccentricity	Discovery year
b	≥19.4±1.5 M_{J}	1.29±0.05	326.03±0.32 days	0.231±0.005	2007
