= 35 Comae Berenices =

Star in the constellation Coma Berenices

- Location of 35 Comae Berenices (circled in red)

Observation data Epoch J2000 Equinox J2000
- Constellation: Coma Berenices
- Right ascension: 12^{h} 53^{m} 17.74703^{s}
- Declination: +21° 14′ 41.8092″
- Apparent magnitude (V): 4.93

Characteristics
- Spectral type: G5 III + F:
- U−B color index: 0.65
- B−V color index: 0.90

Astrometry
Radial velocity (R_{v})	−6.091±0.075 km/s
Proper motion (μ)	RA: −37.66 mas/yr Dec.: −30.14 mas/yr
Parallax (π)	11.52±0.87 mas
Distance	280 ± 20 ly (87 ± 7 pc)

Orbit
Period (P)	539.4±95.4 yr
Semi-major axis (a)	1.405±0.046″
Eccentricity (e)	0.208±0.100
Inclination (i)	28.4±13.4°
Longitude of the node (Ω)	238.7±2.7°
Periastron epoch (T)	1949.4±7.9
Argument of periastron (ω) (secondary)	251.6±7.3°

Other designations
- 35 Com, BD+22°2519, HD 112033, HIP 62886, HR 4894, SAO 82550, WDS J12533+2115AB

Database references
SIMBAD	data

35 Comae Berenices is a multiple star system in the northern constellation of Coma Berenices, located about 6° from the north galactic pole. It is faintly visible to the naked eye with an apparent visual magnitude of 4.93. Based upon parallax measurements, it is located around 280 light years from the Sun. The system is moving closer to the Earth with a heliocentric radial velocity of −6 km/s.

This was found to be a wide binary by Struve in 1828, but it has completed less than half an orbit since then and the orbital elements remain poorly constrained. It has an orbital period of 539±95 years and an eccentricity of 0.2±0.1. The pair have been resolved into stellar classifications of an evolved G-type giant primary of class G5 III and an F-type secondary, most likely main sequence with a class of F1 V. The primary component is a spectroscopic binary with a period of 7.9624 ± 0.0117 years and an eccentricity of 0.63. A fourth component, 35 Com C, is located 29″ from the primary and may have a physical association.
