= Abell 35 =

Nebula located in the constellation of Hydra

Emission nebula
- Planetary nebula
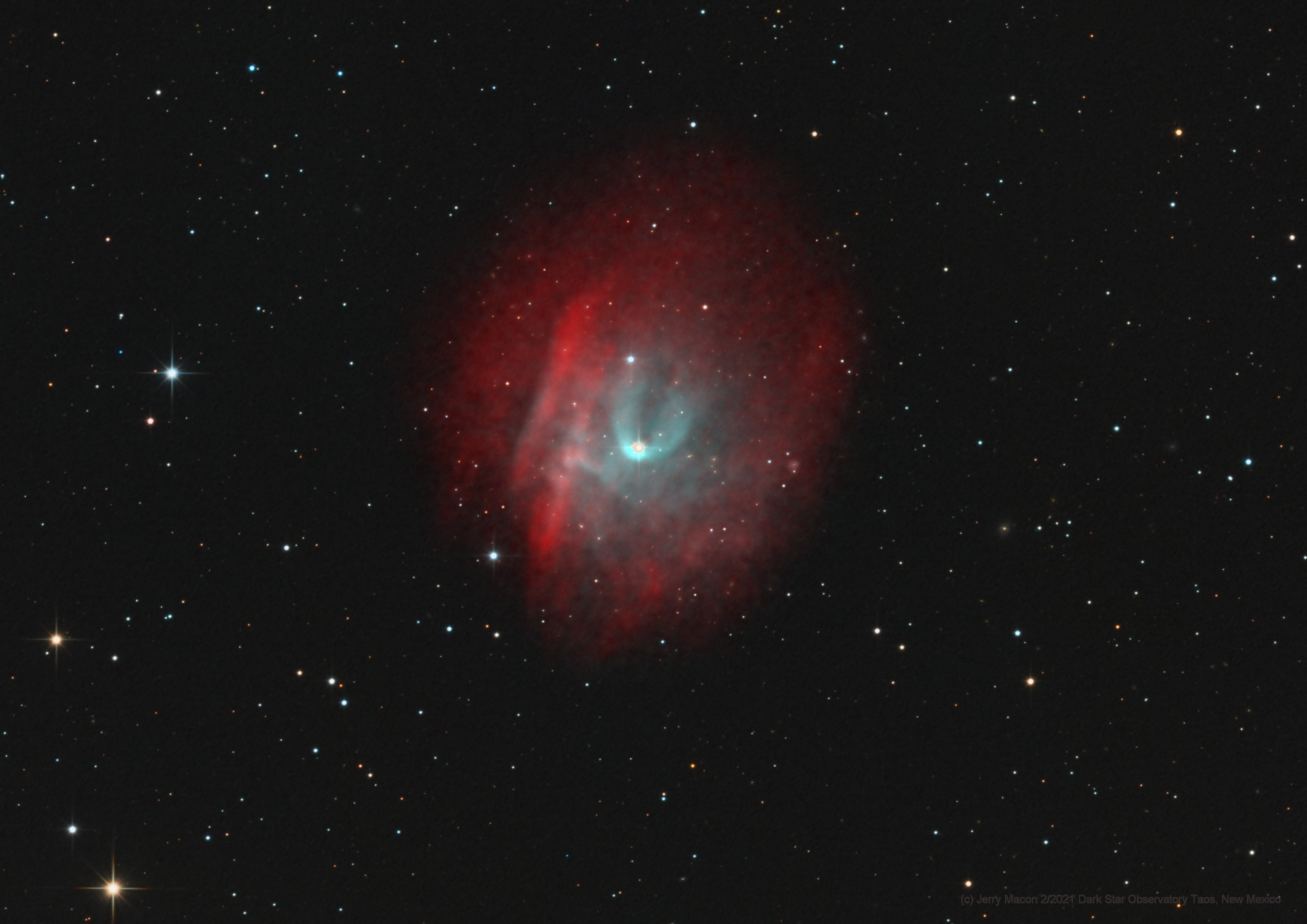

Observation data: J2000.0 epoch
- Right ascension: 12^{h} 53^{m} 32.8^{s}
- Declination: −22° 52′ 23″
- Distance: 400 ly
- Apparent magnitude (V): 9.69
- Apparent dimensions (V): 12.87′
- Constellation: Hydra
- Designations: PN G303.6+40.0, BD-22 3467, HIP 62905, SH 2-313, LW Hya

Abell 35, also known as Sh 2-313, is a nebula located in the constellation of Hydra, at a distance of 400 light years.

The nebula is characterised by its unusual appearance, which features a central bow shock surrounded by symmetric emission. In the centre of the nebula lies a binary star, composed of a G-type star and a white dwarf. Although it is commonly referred to as a planetary nebula, it has been suggested that the nebula wasn't created by a post-AGB star shedding its outer shells but it is interstellar medium photoionised by the passing binary system, leading also to the creation of the bow shock.

The optical spectrum of the central star is dominated by a G8 III–IV star which travels through the interstellar medium with a transverse velocity of 150 km/s. The star is estimated to have a radius of 1.5–3.5 R_{☉}, indicating it is a subgiant star. It's projected rotational velocity is 55 ± 10 km/s, indicating it is rotating fast. The star has a visual apparent magnitude of 9.6 and exhibits short term variability every 0.765 days, indicating this is its rotational period, and has the variable star designation LW Hydrae.

When observed in ultraviolet wavelengths by the International Ultraviolet Explorer, a very hot companion star was discovered, which was categorised as a DAO white dwarf based on the strong absorption features of HI and He II. Its effective temperature is estimated to be about 80,000 Kelvin and its mass to be 0.48 M_{☉}, too low to form a planetary nebula. Using the Hubble Space Telescope, the separation of the two stars was estimated to be between 0.08 and 0.14 arcseconds in 1998.

Planetary nebulae with similar binary systems, comprising a fast rotating late-type subgiant or giant star and a very hot companion are referred to as having Abell 35-type nuclei.
