= 36 Comae Berenices =

Star in the constellation Coma Berenices

- Location of 36 Comae Berenices (circled in red)

Observation data Epoch J2000 Equinox J2000
- Constellation: Coma Berenices
- Right ascension: 12^{h} 58^{m} 55.44277^{s}
- Declination: +17° 24′ 33.9898″
- Apparent magnitude (V): 4.76

Characteristics
- Evolutionary stage: asymptotic giant branch
- Spectral type: M0.5 III
- B−V color index: 1.556

Astrometry
Radial velocity (R_{v})	−1.49±0.27 km/s
Proper motion (μ)	RA: −37.488 mas/yr Dec.: +33.982 mas/yr
Parallax (π)	9.3472±0.2157 mas
Distance	349 ± 8 ly (107 ± 2 pc)
Absolute magnitude (M_{V})	−0.22

Details
Radius	43 R_{☉}
Luminosity	372 L_{☉}
Surface gravity (log g)	1.0 cgs
Temperature	3,890±20 K
Rotational velocity (v sin i)	5.8 km/s

Other designations
- 36 Com, BD+18°2682, FK5 3036, HD 112769, HIP 63355, HR 4920, SAO 100357

Database references
SIMBAD	data

36 Comae Berenices is a single star in the northern constellation of Coma Berenices. It is faintly visible to the naked eye with an apparent visual magnitude of 4.76. The distance to this star, as determined from an annual parallax shift of 9.3 mas, is 349 light years. It is moving closer to the Earth with a heliocentric radial velocity of −1.5 km/s.

This is an evolved red giant star with a stellar classification of M0.5 III, currently on the asymptotic giant branch of the Hertzsprung–Russell diagram. This indicates it has consumed the hydrogen at its center and is now generating energy through hydrogen and helium fusion along shells surrounding an inert carbon and oxygen core. It has expanded to 43 times the radius of the Sun and is radiating 372 times the Sun's luminosity from its photosphere at an effective temperature of 3,890 K.
