= 16 Comae Berenices =

Star in the constellation Coma Berenices

Observation data Epoch J2000 Equinox ICRS
- Constellation: Coma Berenices
- Right ascension: 12^{h} 26^{m} 59.29615^{s}
- Declination: +26° 49′ 32.5273″
- Apparent magnitude (V): 4.96

Characteristics
- Evolutionary stage: main sequence
- Spectral type: A4 V

Astrometry
Radial velocity (R_{v})	+0.40±0.70 km/s
Proper motion (μ)	RA: −11.456 mas/yr Dec.: −9.220 mas/yr
Parallax (π)	11.6745±0.2116 mas
Distance	279 ± 5 ly (86 ± 2 pc)

Details
Mass	2.54±0.03 M_{☉}
Radius	3.71 R_{☉}
Luminosity	68.6+3.5 −3.3 L_{☉}
Surface gravity (log g)	3.67 cgs
Temperature	8,299+57 −58 K
Metallicity [Fe/H]	−0.3 dex
Rotational velocity (v sin i)	80 km/s
Age	310 Myr

Other designations
- 16 Com, BD+27°2134, FK5 2997, HD 108382, HIP 60746, HR 4738, SAO 82314

Database references
SIMBAD	data

16 Comae Berenices is a single star in the northern constellation of Coma Berenices. 16 Comae Berenices is the Flamsteed designation. It is a member of the Coma Star Cluster and is visible to the naked eye with an apparent visual magnitude of 4.96. Based upon an annual parallax shift of 11.7 mas, it is located about 279 light years away.

This is a chemically-peculiar A-type main-sequence star with a stellar classification of A4 V. It displays an infrared excess, suggesting the presence of an orbiting debris disk at a mean distance of 18.2 AU with a temperature of 180 K. 16 Com has 2.54 times the mass of the Sun and 3.71 times the Sun's radius. The star is 310 million years old with a projected rotational velocity of 80 km/s. It is radiating 67 times the Sun's luminosity from its photosphere at an effective temperature of 8,299 K.
