= Arp 84 =

Arp 84 is the designation in the Atlas of Peculiar Galaxies for a pair of gravitationally interacting galaxies in the constellation Canes Venatici:

- NGC 5394
- NGC 5395
