= NGC 4631 Group =

Galaxy cluster in the constellations Coma Berenices and Canes Venatici

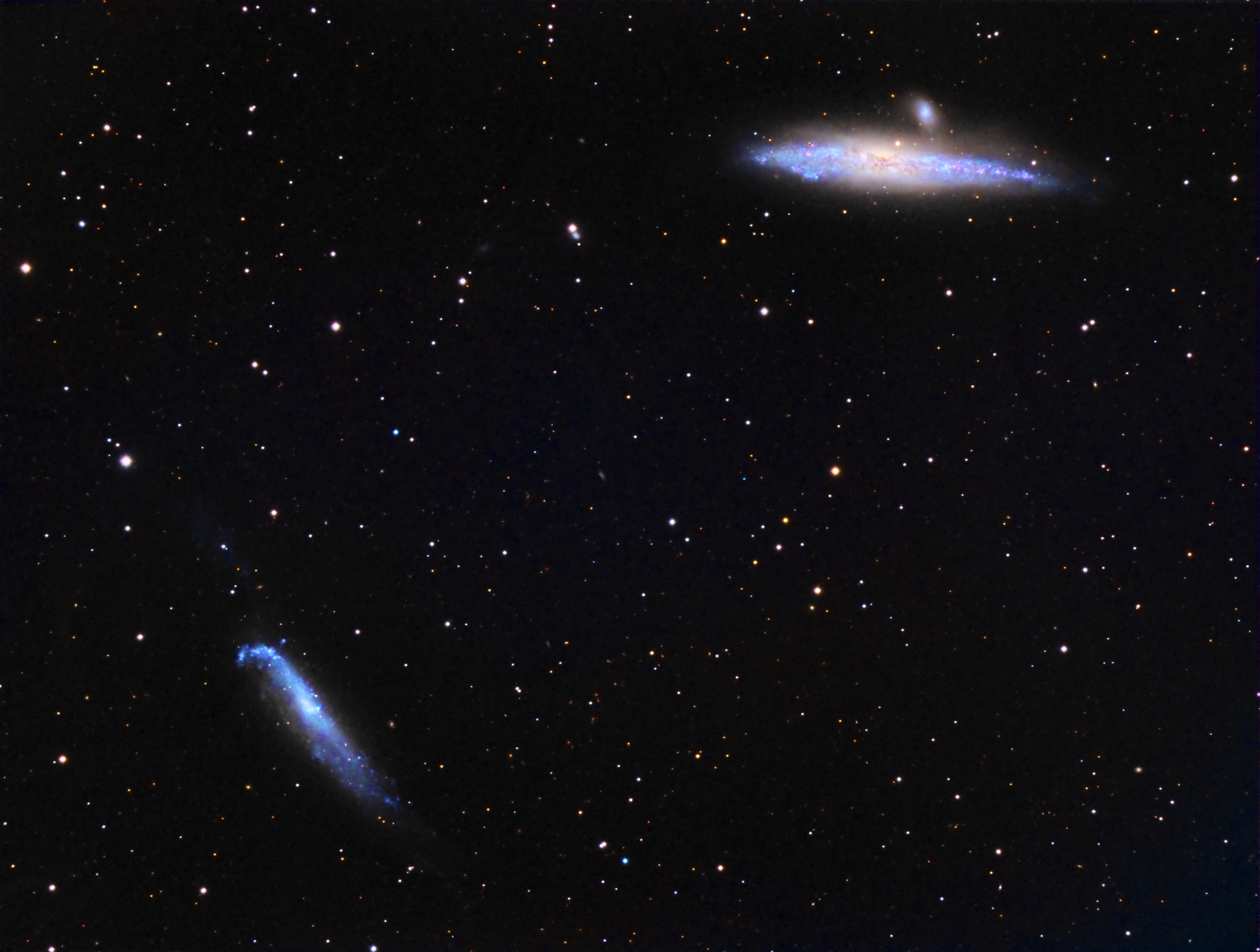
- NGC 4631 and NGC 4627 top right. NGC 4656 and NGC 4657 bottom right.

Observation data (Epoch J2000)
- Constellation(s): Canes Venatici & Coma Berenices
- Right ascension: 12^{h} 09^{m}
- Declination: +30° 02′
- Brightest member: NGC 4631
- Number of galaxies: 5–27

Other designations
- LGG 291, NOGG H611, NOGG P1 631, NOGG P2 642

The NGC 4631 Group is a poorly defined group of galaxies, about 25 million light-years from Earth in the constellations Coma Berenices and Canes Venatici.

The NGC 4631 Group is one of many that lie within the Virgo Supercluster, within Coma–Sculptor Cloud.

== Members ==
- spiral galaxy NGC 4631 (Whale Galaxy), brightest galaxy in the group
- interacting galaxies NGC 4656 and NGC 4657 (Hockey Stick Galaxies)
- dwarf elliptical galaxy NGC 4627, which is a companion of NGC 4631, is also by default a member of the group, although it is not listed in most catalogs

Aside from these four galaxies, however, the determination of group membership is quite variable. The group lies in a relatively crowded part of the sky near the Virgo Cluster, so exact determination of the group membership is extremely difficult. Some studies have estimated that the NGC 4631 Group contains as few as five galaxies, while others place the estimate as high as 27. Additionally, it is unclear as to whether the galaxies near NGC 4631 and NGC 4656/NGC 4657 form one large group or two smaller groups.

== See also ==
- Virgo Cluster
