= NGC 4656 and NGC 4657 =

Galaxy in constellation Canes Venatici

NGC 4656/7
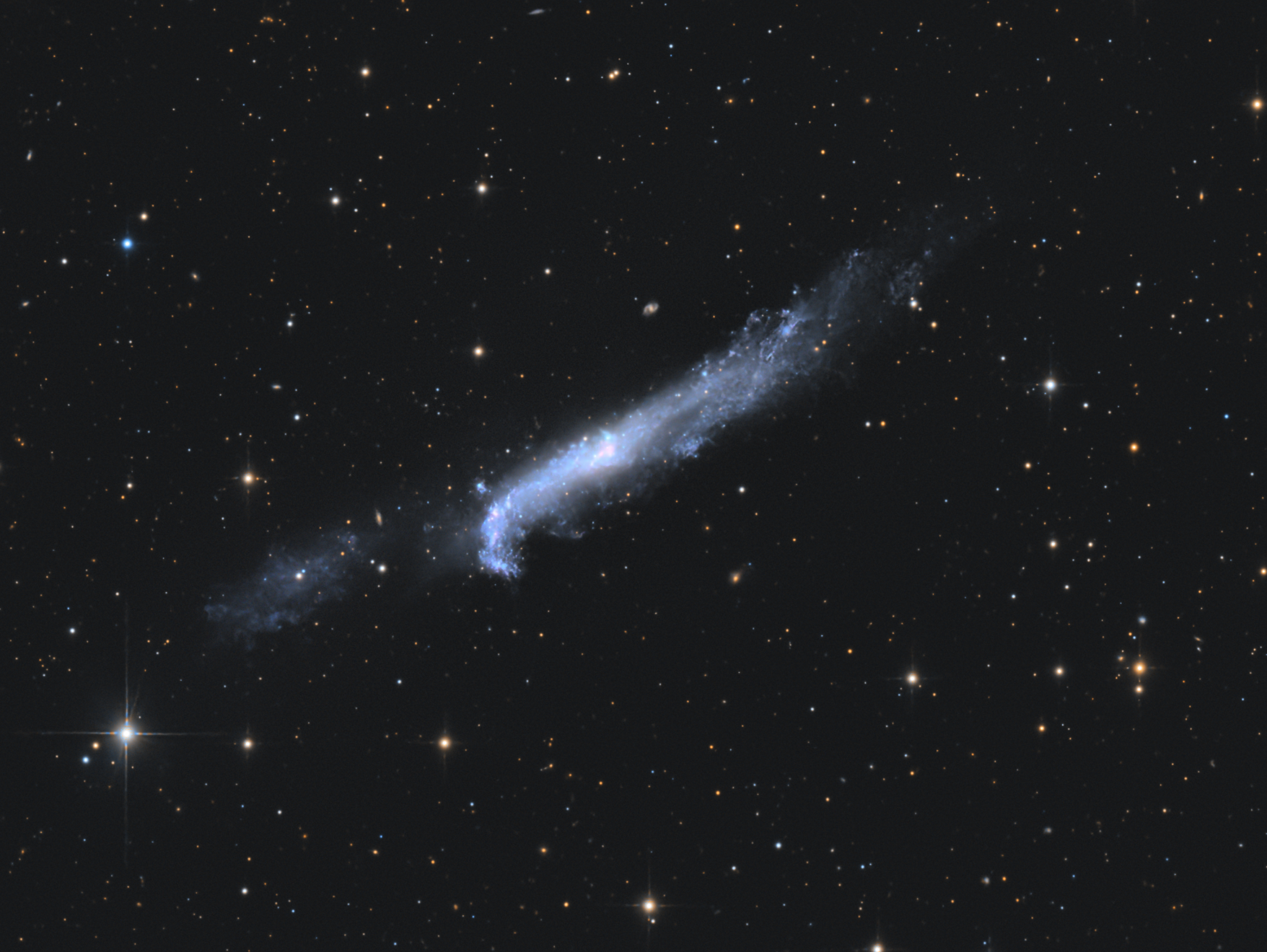
- NGC 4656/7

Observation data (J2000 epoch)
- Constellation: Canes Venatici
- Right ascension: 12^{h} 43^{m} 57.7^{s}
- Declination: +32° 10′ 05″
- Heliocentric radial velocity: 646 km/s
- Apparent magnitude (V): 10.1

Characteristics
- Type: SB(s)m pec
- Size: 78,500 ly
- Apparent size (V): 15.3′ × 2.4′
- Notable features: similar to SMC

Other designations
- Hockey Stick Galaxies, Crowbar Galaxy, NGC 4656, UGC 7907, PGC 42863

NGC 4656/57 is a highly warped, edge-on barred spiral galaxy in the constellation of Canes Venatici. Alternatively, it is known as Messier's Hockey Stick, the Hook Galaxy ("The Hook"), the Hummingbird Galaxy, Fish Hook Galaxy, Hockey Stick Galaxy, or the Crowbar Galaxy. It is located at a distance of 30 million light years away from Milky Way where it is a member of the NGC 4631 Group. Its unusual shape is thought to be due to an interaction between NGC 4656, NGC 4631, and NGC 4627.

A luminous blue variable in "super-outburst" was discovered in NGC 4656/57 on March 21, 2005.

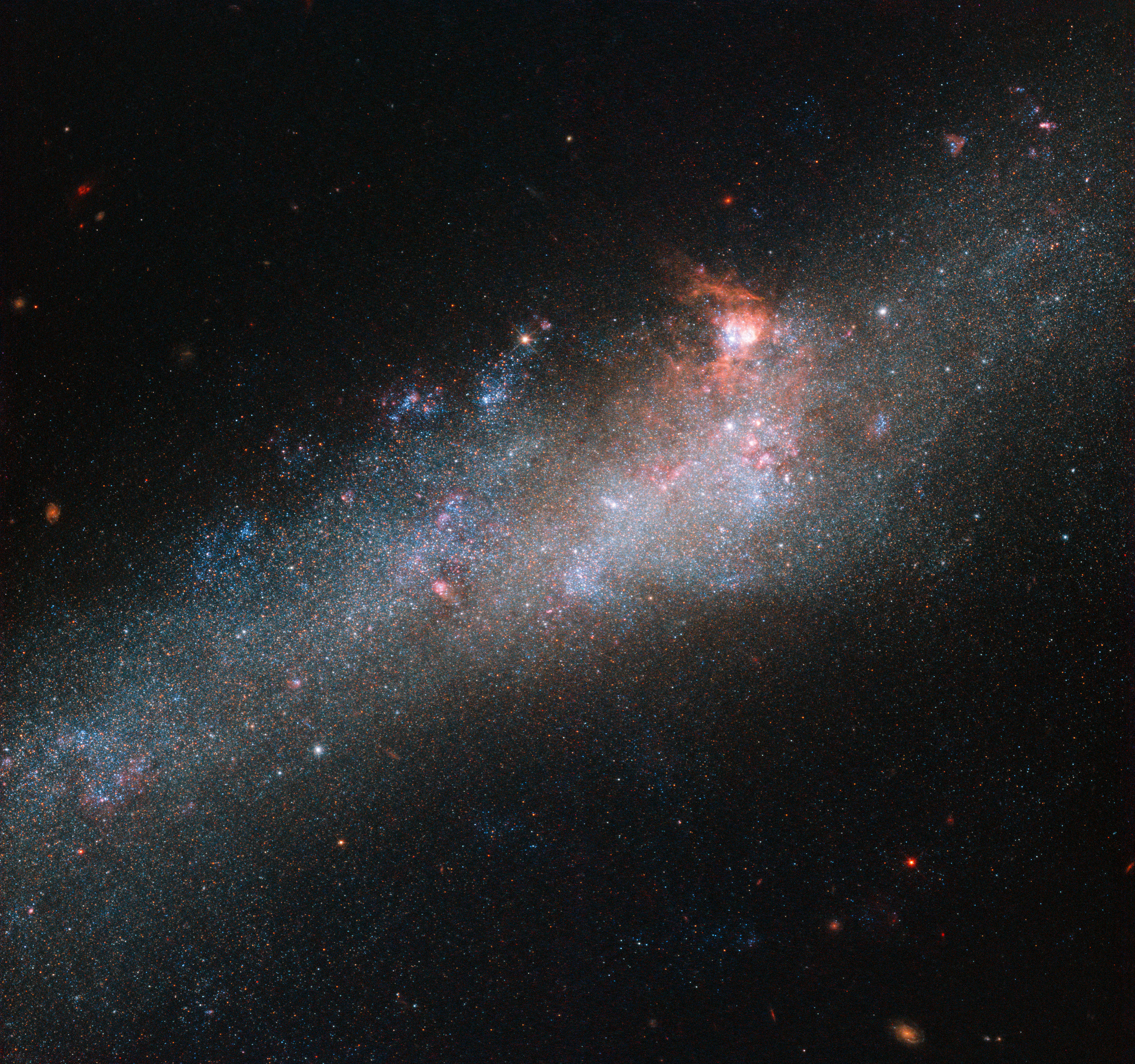
Close up Hubble image of the galaxy

== See also ==
- Antennae Galaxies
