= NGC 4868 =

Galaxy in the constellation Canes Venatici

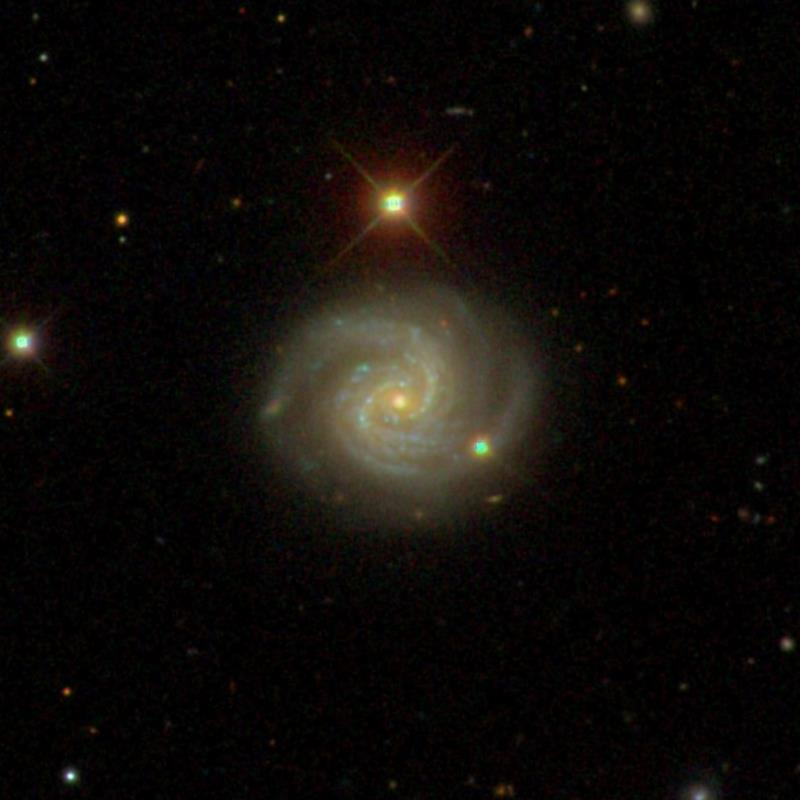
- SDSS image of NGC 4868

Observation data (J2000 epoch)
- Constellation: Canes Venatici
- Right ascension: 12^{h} 59^{m} 08.88278^{s}
- Declination: +37° 18′ 37.4675″
- Redshift: 0.015597
- Heliocentric radial velocity: 4639 km/s
- Distance: 241 Mly (74.0 Mpc)
- Group or cluster: NGC 4914 group (LGG 319)
- Apparent magnitude (B): 12.95

Characteristics
- Type: SAab?
- Apparent size (V): 1.6′

Other designations
- UGC 8099, MCG +06-29-004, PGC 44557

NGC 4868 is an unbarred spiral galaxy located about 240 million light-years away in the constellation Canes Venatici. It was discovered by William Herschel on March 17, 1787. A 2002 study suggests that a quasar may exist within NGC 4868.

== NGC 4914 group ==
NGC 4868 is a member of the NGC 4914 group (also known as LGG 319) which has at least 3 galaxies, including NGC 4846 and NGC 4914.

== Supernova ==
One supernova has been observed in NGC 4868:

- SN 2018cur (Type II-P, mag. 17.333) was discovered by ATLAS on 22 June 2018.

== See also ==
- List of galaxies
- New General Catalogue
