= NGC 5361 =

Galaxy in the constellation Canes Venatici

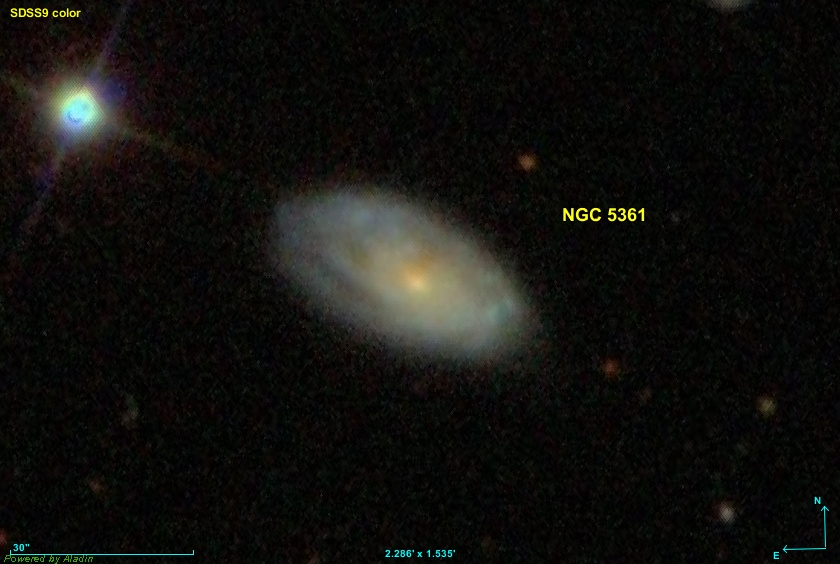
- NGC 5361 imaged by SDSS

Observation data (J2000 epoch)
- Constellation: Canes Venatici
- Right ascension: 13^{h} 54^{m} 35.2197^{s}
- Declination: +38° 26′ 58.150″
- Redshift: 0.018843±0.0000430
- Heliocentric radial velocity: 5,649±13 km/s
- Distance: 280.9 ± 19.7 Mly (86.13 ± 6.04 Mpc)
- Group or cluster: [T2015] nest 103103
- Apparent magnitude (V): 14.78

Characteristics
- Type: S
- Size: ~93,600 ly (28.70 kpc) (estimated)
- Apparent size (V): 0.8′ × 0.4′

Other designations
- IRAS 13524+3841, 2MASX J13543519+3826582, MCG +07-29-015, PGC 49441, CGCG 219-025

NGC 5361 is a spiral galaxy in the constellation of Canes Venatici. Its velocity with respect to the cosmic microwave background is 5,840±19 km/s, which corresponds to a Hubble distance of 280.9 ± 19.7 Mly (86.13 ± 6.04 Mpc). It was discovered by German-British astronomer William Herschel on 16 May 1787.

NGC 5361 has a possible active galactic nucleus, i.e. it has a compact region at the center of a galaxy that emits a significant amount of energy across the electromagnetic spectrum, with characteristics indicating that this luminosity is not produced by the stars.

NGC 5361 and UGC 8858 form pair of galaxies. The grouping is known as [T2015] nest 103103.

== Supernova ==
One supernova has been observed in NGC 5361:

- SN 2025ino (Type IIb, mag. 19.195) was discovered by ATLAS on 27 April 2025.

== See also ==
- List of NGC objects (5001–6000)
