= SDSS J132020.35+485409.1 =

Radio galaxy in the constellation Canes Venatici

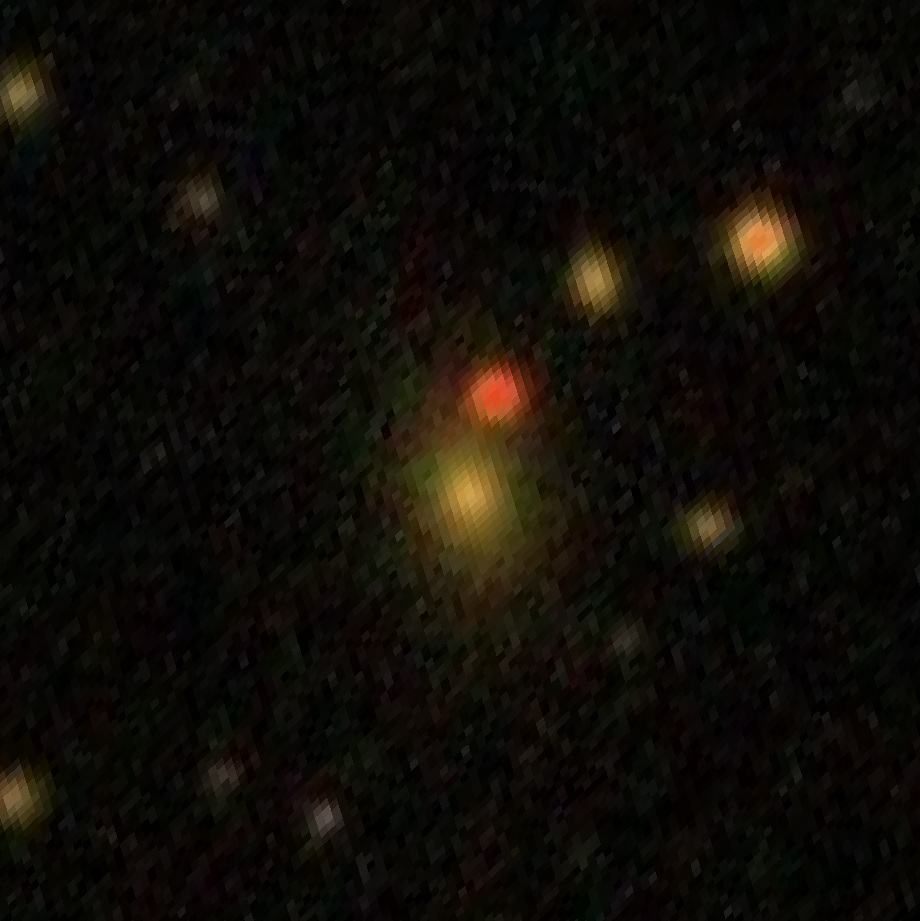
- The radio galaxy SDSS J132020.35+485409.1

Observation data (J2000.0 epoch)
- Constellation: Canes Venatici
- Right ascension: 13^{h} 20^{m} 20.33^{s}
- Declination: +48° 54′ 08.84″
- Redshift: 0.232271
- Heliocentric radial velocity: 69,633 ± 15 km/s
- Distance: 3,358.0 ± 235.1 Mly (1,029.56 ± 72.07 Mpc)
- Group or cluster: WHL J132020.4+485409

Characteristics
- Type: BrClG
- Size: ~310,000 ly (95.05 kpc) (estimated)

Other designations
- 2MASS J13202033+4854088, RGZ J132020.2+485409, LEDA 2328442, [LHC2018] J200.08479+48.90250, WHL J132020.4+485409 BCG

SDSS J132020.35+485409.1 also known as 6C B131811.2+490938 and RGZ J132020.2+485409, is a radio galaxy located in the constellation of Canes Venatici. The redshift of the galaxy is estimated to be (z) 0.232.

== Description ==
SDSS J132020.35+485409.1 is classified as a luminous red galaxy residing as the brightest cluster galaxy (BCG) of the galaxy cluster, WHL J132020.4+485409. The r-band magnitude of the galaxy is 17.24 magnitude while the absolute magnitude is -23.07. A supermassive black hole is located in the center of the galaxy with a mass of 8.42 M_{☉}.

The optical spectrum of the galaxy displays emission lines of mainly hydrogen-alpha and doubly ionized oxygen with the line luminosities estimated as 6.612 and 6.160 L_{☉}.

The nucleus is also active and has been classified as a Fanaroff-Riley Class Type I radio galaxy. It ihas radio lobes with a total size of 78.53 kiloparsecs. The total radio luminosity is 25.53 W Hz^{−1}. A study in 2011, had previously categorized it as a Fanaroff-Riley Class Type II radio galaxy with a total radio flux density of 69.4 mJy. The angular size of the source is 20 arcseconds while the linear size is 74.07 kiloparsecs. There no evidence of either a radio core or hot spot features.

A study published in 2019, found it is a bent-tailed radio galaxy with the flux density of 65.60 mJy, obtained from the NRAO VLA Sky Survey (NVSS). The source is also bent, with its approximate bending angle measured to be 33.2. The excess bending angle is 30.4°.
