= NGC 5406 =

Galaxy in the constellation Canes Venatici

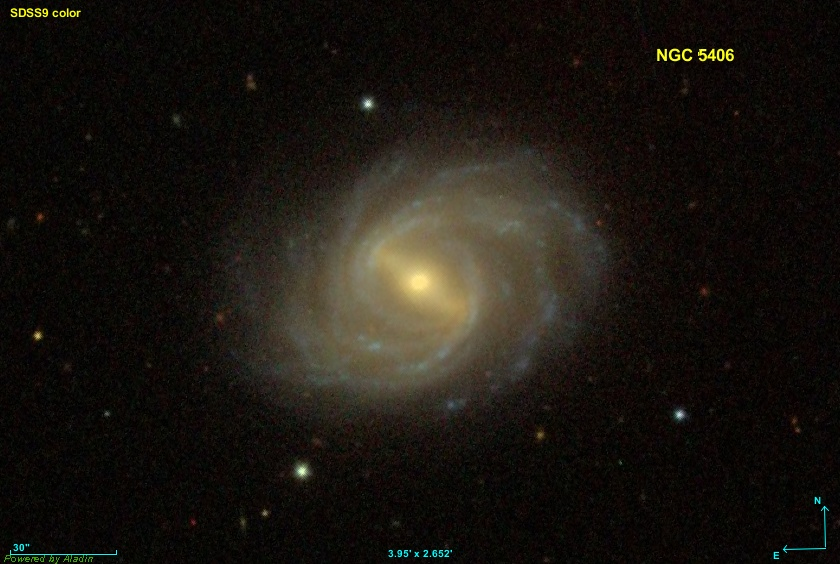
- NGC 5406 imaged by SDSS

Observation data (J2000 epoch)
- Constellation: Canes Venatici
- Right ascension: 14^{h} 00^{m} 20.1358^{s}
- Declination: +38° 54′ 55.640″
- Redshift: 0.017969±0.00000667
- Heliocentric radial velocity: 5,387±2 km/s
- Distance: 140.06 ± 34.21 Mly (42.943 ± 10.489 Mpc)
- Apparent magnitude (V): 13.1g

Characteristics
- Type: SAB(rs)bc
- Size: ~86,300 ly (26.47 kpc) (estimated)
- Apparent size (V): 2.04′ × 1.10′

Other designations
- IRAS 13582+3909, 2MASX J14002009+3854553, UGC 8925, MCG +07-29-031, PGC 49847, CGCG 219-038

NGC 5406 is a barred spiral galaxy in the constellation of Canes Venatici. Its velocity with respect to the cosmic microwave background is 5,571±13 km/s, which corresponds to a Hubble distance of 268.0 ± 18.8 Mly (82.17 ± 5.76 Mpc). However, seven non-redshift measurements give a much closer mean distance of 140.06 ± 34.21 Mly (42.943 ± 10.489 Mpc). It was discovered by German-British astronomer William Herschel on 16 May 1787.

NGC 5406 is a LINER galaxy, i.e. a galaxy whose nucleus has an emission spectrum characterized by broad lines of weakly ionized atoms.

According to Abraham Mahtessian, NGC 5406 and NGC 5407 form a pair of galaxies.

== Supernovae ==
Two supernovae have been observed in NGC 5406:

- SN 1977B (type unknown, mag. 14) was discovered by Hungarian Astronomer Miklós Lovas on 18 March 1977.
- PSN J14002117+3854517 (Type II, mag. 18.2) was discovered by Paolo Campaner and the Italian Supernovae Search Project (ISSP) on 18 February 2015.

== See also ==
- List of NGC objects (5001–6000)
