= NGC 5009 =

Elliptical galaxy in the constellation Canes Venatici

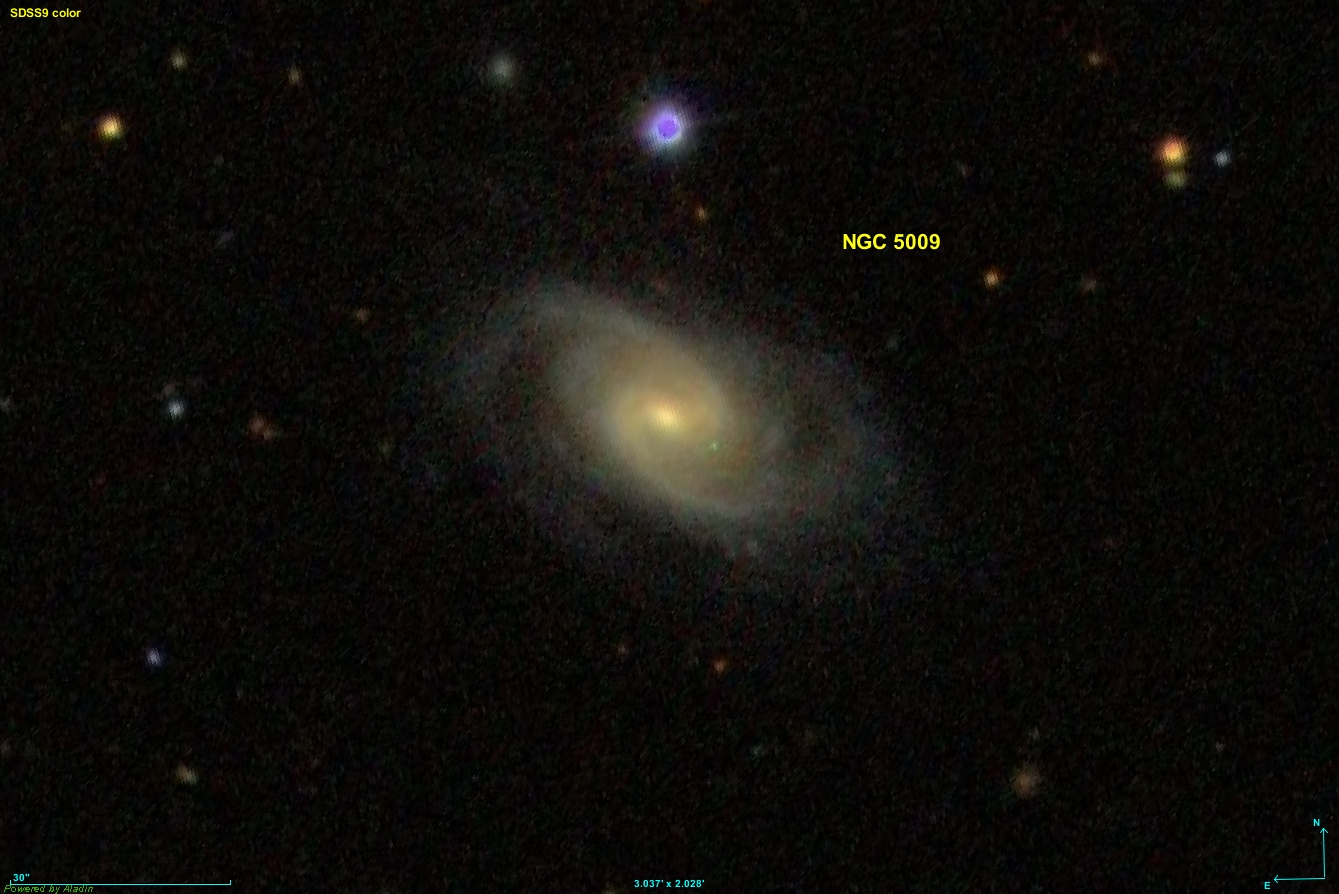
- An image of NGC 5009 from the Sloan Digital Sky Survey

Observation data (J2000 epoch)
- Constellation: Canes Venatici
- Right ascension: 13^{h} 10^{m} 47.0245^{s}
- Declination: +50° 05′ 34.367″
- Redshift: 9388 ± 2 km/s

Characteristics
- Type: G

Other designations
- CGCG 245-025

NGC 5009 (also known as 2MASX J13104698+5005301, UGC 8258 and PGC 45739) is a barred spiral galaxy located in the constellation Canes Venatici. It was discovered on by German-British astronomer William Herschel on 26 April 1789. NGC 5009 is situated north of the celestial equator and, as such, it is more easily visible from the Northern Hemisphere. Given its visual magnitude of 15.6, NGC 5009 is invisible to the naked eye and only visible through long exposure photography.
