= J1328+2752 =

Galaxy in the constellation of Canes Venatici

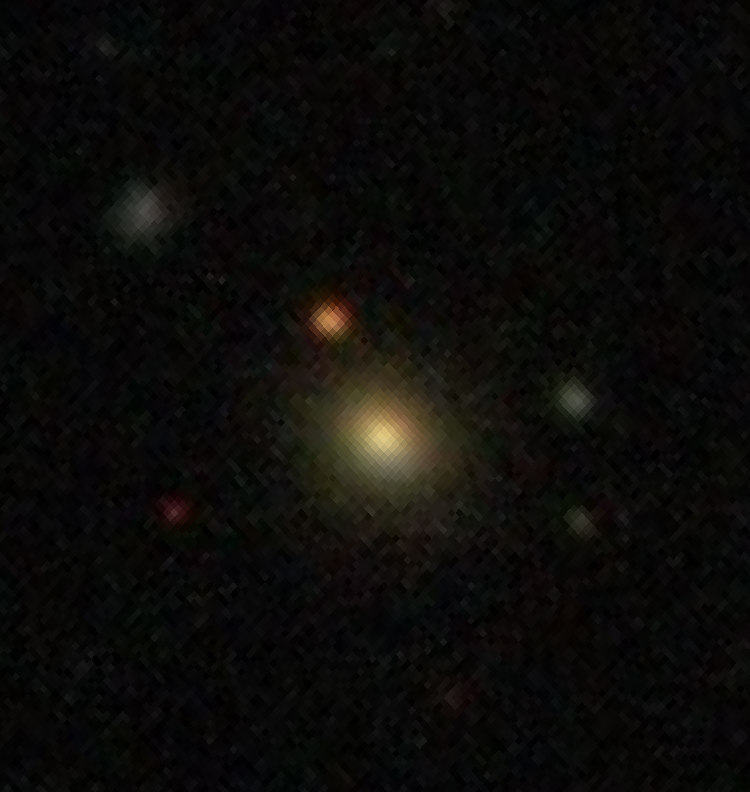
- SDSS image of J1328+2752

Observation data (J2000.0 epoch)
- Constellation: Canes Venatici
- Right ascension: 13^{h} 28^{m} 48.45^{s}
- Declination: +27° 52′ 27.93″
- Redshift: 0.091144
- Heliocentric radial velocity: 27,324 ± 4
- Distance: 1,315.9 ± 92.1 Mly (403.45 ± 28.24 Mpc)
- Magnitude (J): 14.96

Characteristics
- Type: AGN
- Size: ~136,000 ly (41.8 kpc) (estimated)

Other designations
- LEDA 1820308, 2MASX J13284845+2752280, NGP9 F324-0743354, SDSS J132848.45+275227.8, [KJK2017] J1328+2752

J1328+2752 is a Type 2 Seyfert galaxy located in the constellation of Canes Venatici. The redshift of the galaxy is (z) 0.091 and it was first discovered from a sample of 167 dual active galactic nuclei by astronomers in January 2010. It has been categorized as a double-double radio galaxy.

== Description ==
J1328+2752 is a radio galaxy. The radio structure of the galaxy is classified as compact, with a visible flat radio spectrum core in the center that is shown to have weak radio emission based on a 607 MHz image. The outer radio lobes have an asymmetric appearance. There is a hotspot feature present in the southern radio lobe while the northern radio lobe shows an absence of a hotspot feature. The northern outer radio lobe has been described to have a sharp bending angle towards the northeast direction. The inner double lobes are also asymmetric but embedded within an area of older radio emission. A bright hotspot is shown dominating over the northern component on the inner side. Both inner and outer lobes have spectral indexes of 0.64 ± 0.002 and 0.56 ± 0.06 respectively.

The host galaxy of J1328+2752 is an elliptical galaxy with emission lines that are described as highly ionized with a narrow appearance. The host galaxy also contains a disk component that dominates an area over 2.5 kiloparsecs with a bulge dominated inner portion. A study published in 2021 has confirmed J1328+2752 has a binary supermassive black hole with an estimated separation of only six parsecs based on existence of two radio core components from imaging made by Very Long Baseline Array (VLBA) and its double-peaked emission lines with the same separation gap as the components. A study published in 2024, has found the presence of a single central component with an unresolved appearance at all frequencies and the flux density increasing by around a factor of 3.
