= NGC 5098 =

Binary pair of distant galaxies in Canes Venatici constellation

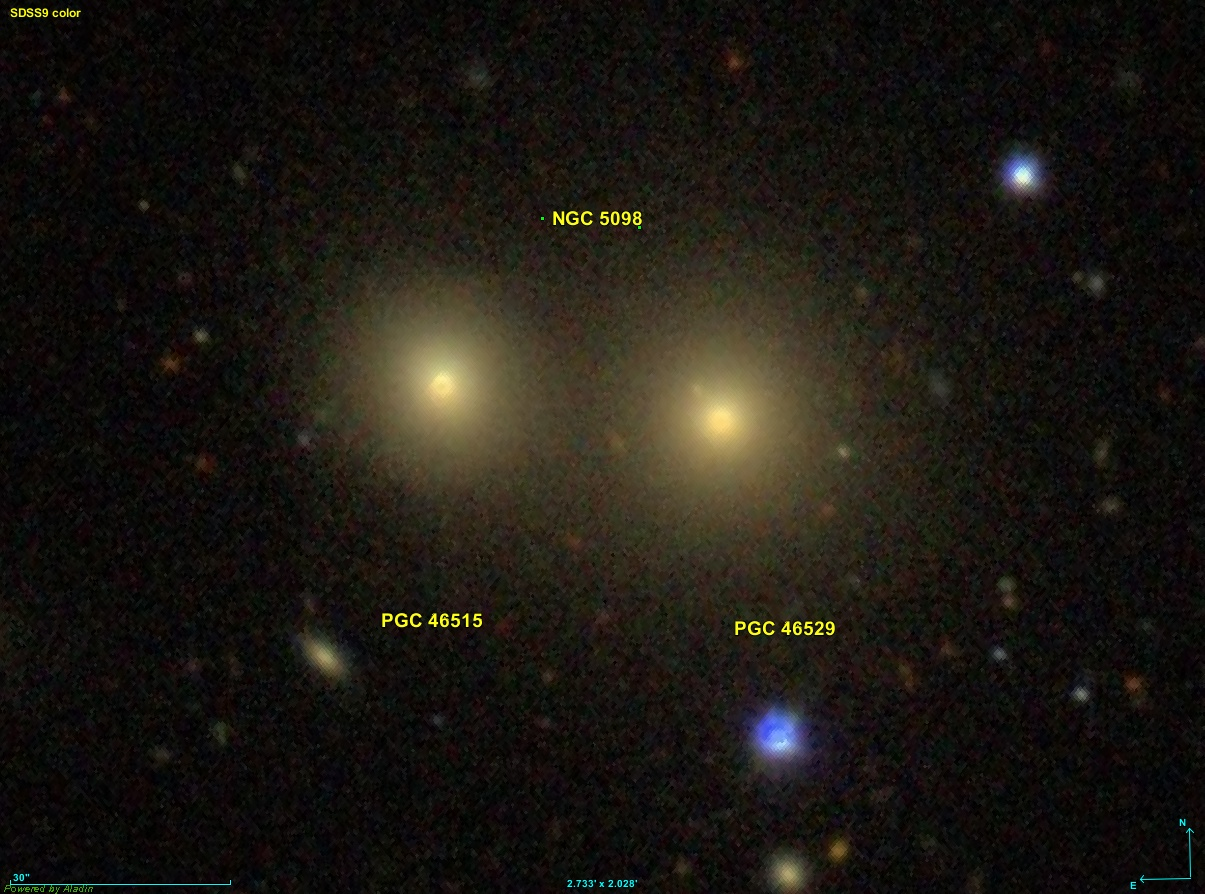
- Sloan Digital Sky Survey image of galaxy pair NGC 5098

Observation data
- Constellation: Canes Venatici
- Right ascension: 13^{h} 20^{m} 16.2^{s}
- Declination: +33° 08′ 39″
- Redshift: 0.037893
- Heliocentric radial velocity: 11,360 km/s
- Distance: 559 Mly (171.3 Mpc)
- Group or cluster: NGC 5098 Group
- Apparent magnitude (V): 15.0

Characteristics
- Type: S? & S?, E0 & ES-0, E & E
- Size: 128,000 ly (approximately 39.16 kpc) & 168,000 ly (approximately 51.60 kpc)
- Apparent size (V): 0.85 x 0.74 & 0.89 x 0.71

Other designations
- PGC 46529 & PGC 46515, MCG +06-29-077 & MCG +06-29-78, CGCG 189-052, B2 1317+33, 7C 1317+3324, 2MASX J13201775+3308409 & 2MASX J13201472+3308359, V1CG 166 NED01 & V1CG NED02, NSA143330 & NSA 091891

NGC 5098 is a binary pair of distant galaxies located in the constellation Canes Venatici. They are made up of one Type E elliptical galaxy, PGC 46529 or NGC 5098 NED01 located east and one Type ES-0 lenticular galaxy, PGC 46515 or NGC 5098 NED02 located west. Both galaxies are located 559 million light-years away from the Solar System and were discovered on April 29, 1827, by John Herschel.

== Characteristics ==
NGC 5098 belongs to the NGC 5098 galaxy group which is located some 560 million light-years away. They are the central galaxy pair, first identified by Ramella et al. 1995 "their group 80." NGC 5098 NED01 is the brighter and larger of the two, showing optical magnitudes of MB = −21.131 and MV = −22.097, as compared to MB = −20.845 and MV = −21.770 for NGC 5098 NED02, which the magnitudes were calculated from Sloan Digital Sky Survey by Adelman-McCarthy and converted to Johnson filter system via the relations provided by Smith et al.

NGC 5098 NED01 hosts an extended radio source, B2 1317+33 which was detected at several frequencies. A study showed there is evidence of gas swooshing and active galactic nucleus (AGN) heating up which the most likely contributor is the nearby galaxy, NGC 5098 NED02 which is being stripped of its gaseous atmosphere. Significant cavities are present in the central region, which two distinctive bubbles are located north and northeast. They are similar to X-ray observations of other galaxies, groups and clusters. These are formed when active galactic nucleus (AGN) jets push into local ICM, evacuating cavities and creating bright rims of X-ray emission from displaced gas.

A plume of emission is seen extending northeast from NGC 5098 NED01, exhibiting a spiral arm morphology which originates east from the galaxy and wrapping around to the north. This presence of a feature indicates NGC 5098 NED01 is indeed interacting with NGC 5098 NED02.

Apart from that, there is a sharp surface brightness to west, southwest and south, which is approximately 28 kpc from the central AGN of NGC 5098 NED01. It appears to go eastwards and define the outer boundaries of the arm, adding to the overall impression of the spiral pattern in diffuse emission. The edges are quite similar to features that are seen from cold fronts generated by gas sloshing in observations and simulations of galaxy clusters and groups.

A study shows that NGC 5098 NED02 does not show any traces of associate emission in X-rays, implying it was stripped of gas. It is possible NGC 5098 NED02 after being ram-pressured stripped and passing east of NGC 5098 NED01 might have circled around it and now moving east, creating a conical wake in diffuse emission.
