= NGC 4914 =

Galaxy in the constellation Canes Venatici

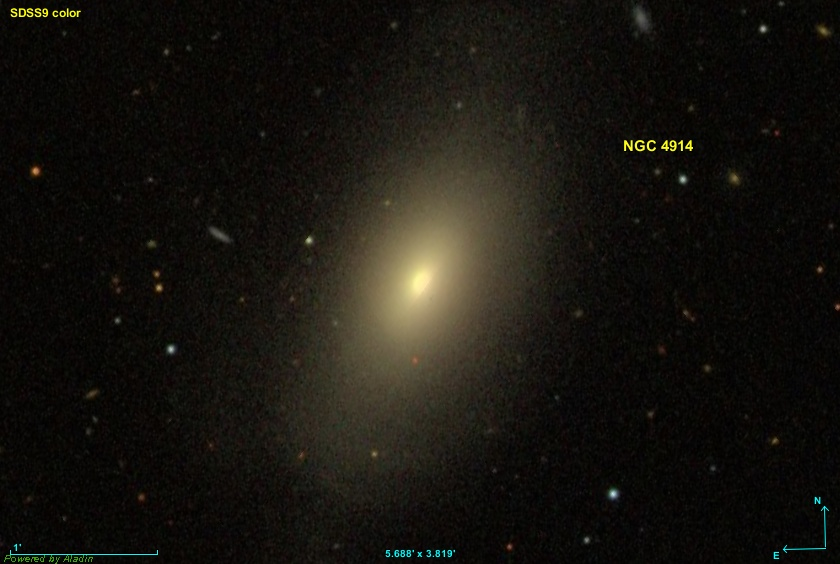
- NGC 4914 imaged by SDSS

Observation data (J2000 epoch)
- Constellation: Canes Venatici
- Right ascension: 13^{h} 00^{m} 42.9213^{s}
- Declination: +37° 18′ 55.086″
- Redshift: 0.015287±0.0000510
- Heliocentric radial velocity: 4,583±15 km/s
- Distance: 111.76 ± 21.42 Mly (34.267 ± 6.567 Mpc)
- Group or cluster: NGC 4914 group (LGG 319)
- Apparent magnitude (V): 12.49

Characteristics
- Type: E+
- Size: ~113,800 ly (34.89 kpc) (estimated)
- Apparent size (V): 3.5′ × 1.9′

Other designations
- 2MASX J13004296+3718552, UGC 8125, MCG +06-29-014, PGC 44807, CGCG 189-013

NGC 4914 is an elliptical galaxy in the constellation of Canes Venatici. Its velocity with respect to the cosmic microwave background is 4,816±22 km/s, which corresponds to a Hubble distance of 231.7 ± 16.3 Mly (71.04 ± 4.99 Mpc). However, three non-redshift measurements give a much closer mean distance of 111.76 ± 21.42 Mly (34.267 ± 6.567 Mpc). It was discovered by German-British astronomer William Herschel on 17 March 1787.

NGC 4914 has a possible active galactic nucleus, i.e. it has a compact region at the center of a galaxy that emits a significant amount of energy across the electromagnetic spectrum, with characteristics indicating that this luminosity is not produced by the stars.

== NGC 4914 group ==
NGC 4914 is the namesake of the NGC 4914 group (also known as LGG 319) which has at least 3 members. The other two galaxies are NGC 4846 and NGC 4868.

== Supernova ==
One supernova has been observed in NGC 4914:

- SN 2026fjc (Type Ia, mag. 18.475) was discovered by ATLAS on 12 March 2026.

== See also ==
- List of NGC objects (4001–5000)
