= NGC 5394 =

Interacting barred spiral galaxy in the constellation Canes Venatici

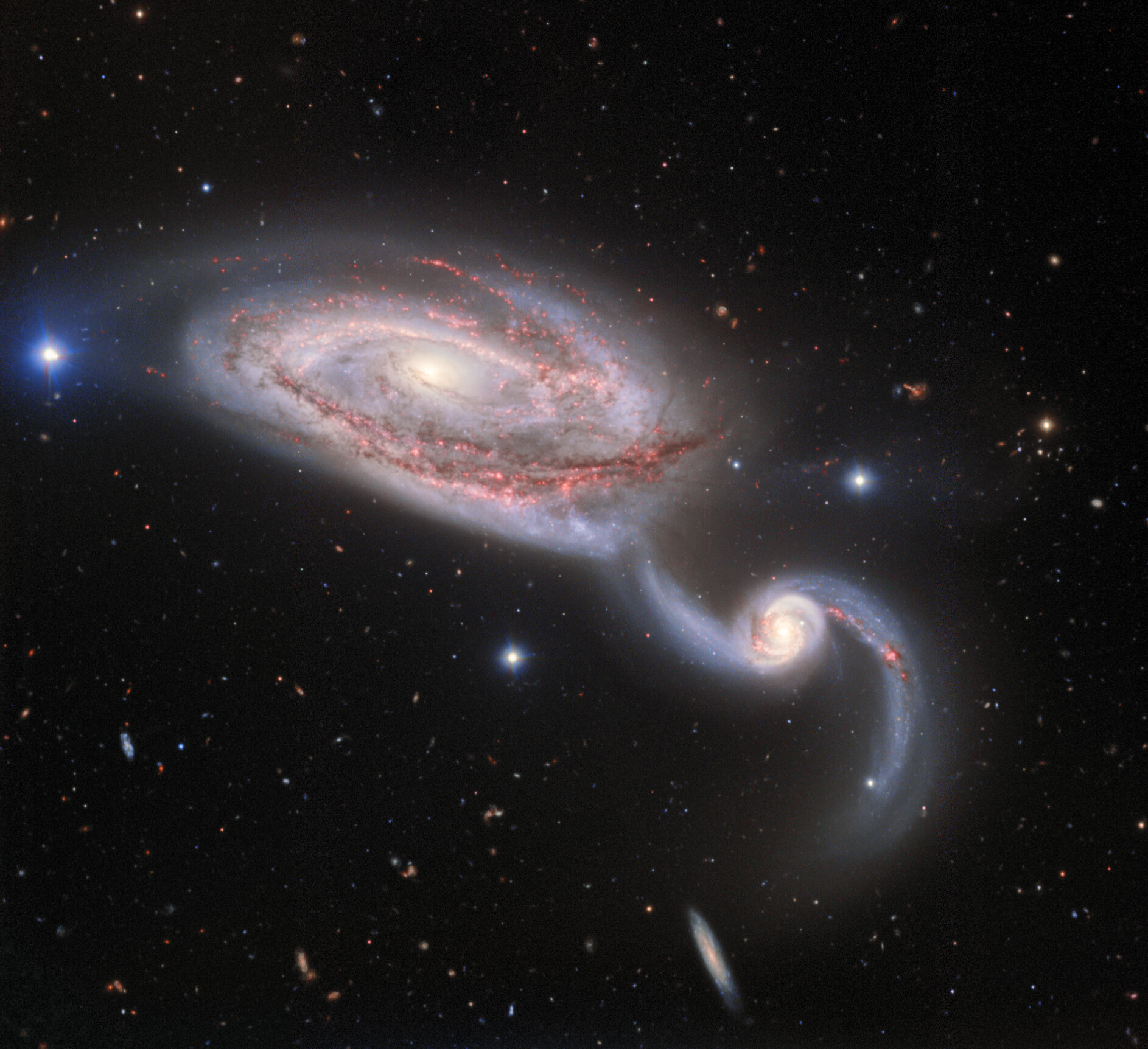
- NGC 5394 (right) and NGC 5395 (left), as imaged by the Gemini North

Observation data (J2000 epoch)
- Constellation: Canes Venatici
- Right ascension: 13h 58m 33s
- Declination: +37° 27′ 12″
- Redshift: 0.011501
- Heliocentric radial velocity: 3,448 km/s
- Distance: 175 Mly (53.67 Mpc)
- Apparent magnitude (B): 13.7
- Absolute magnitude (V): 13.12
- Surface brightness: 23.78 mag/arcsec^2

Characteristics
- Type: SBb
- Size: 96,900 ly (29.7 kpc estimated)
- Apparent size (V): 1.9' x 1.3'

Other designations
- PGC 49739, UGC 8898, VV 48b, Arp 84, IRAS 13564+3741, MCG +06-31-033, CGCG 191-024

NGC 5394 is a barred spiral galaxy located in the constellation Canes Venatici. Its speed relative to the cosmic microwave background is 3,639 ± 14 km/s, which corresponds to a Hubble distance of 53.7 ± 3.8 Mpc (~175 million ly). NGC 5394 was discovered by German-British astronomer William Herschel in 1787.

The luminosity class of NGC 5394 is II and it has a broad HI line. It also contains regions of ionized hydrogen. It is also a Luminous Infrared Galaxy (LIRG).

To date, one non-redshift-based measurement gives a distance of approximately 32,900 Mpc (~107 million ly). This value is far outside the Hubble distance values. Note that it is with the average value of independent measurements, when they exist, that the NASA/IPAC database calculates the diameter of a galaxy.

One supernova has been observed in NGC 5394: SN 2020aaxs (Type Ib, mag. 17.0483) was discovered by the Automatic Learning for the Rapid Classification of Events (ALeRCE) on 25 November 2020.

== Arp 84 ==
NGC 5394 and NGC 5395 are a pair of gravitationally interacting galaxies that appear in Halton Arp's Atlas of Peculiar Galaxies under the designation Arp 84. Arp noted that NGC 5495 is a spiral with a high surface luminosity companion at the end of one of its arms.

== NGC 5395 group ==
According to A.M. Garcia, NGC 5394 is part of a group of galaxies that has at least five members, the NGC 5395 group. The other galaxies are NGC 5341, NGC 5351, NGC 5395 and UGC 8806.

== See also ==
- NGC 646, another interacting galaxy with a similar shape
- List of NGC objects (5001–6000)
