= NGC 5378 =

Galaxy in the constellation Canes Venatici

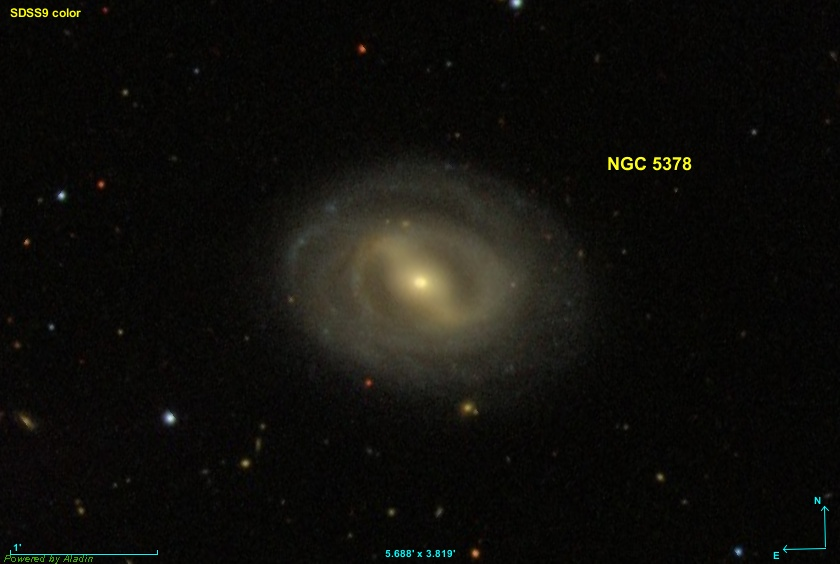
- NGC 5378 imaged by SDSS

Observation data (J2000 epoch)
- Constellation: Canes Venatici
- Right ascension: 13^{h} 56^{m} 51.0361^{s}
- Declination: +37° 47′ 50.188″
- Redshift: 0.009957±0.00000667
- Heliocentric radial velocity: 2,985±2 km/s
- Distance: 152.8 ± 10.7 Mly (46.85 ± 3.29 Mpc)
- Group or cluster: NGC 5378 group (LGG 364)
- Apparent magnitude (V): 13.4g

Characteristics
- Type: (R')SB(r)a
- Size: ~154,400 ly (47.35 kpc) (estimated)
- Apparent size (V): 1.71′ × 1.37′

Other designations
- 2MASX J13565101+3747494, UGC 8869, MCG +06-31-027, PGC 49598, CGCG 191-020

NGC 5378 is a barred spiral galaxy in the constellation of Canes Venatici. Its velocity with respect to the cosmic microwave background is 3,176±14 km/s, which corresponds to a Hubble distance of 152.8 ± 10.7 Mly (46.85 ± 3.29 Mpc). It was discovered by British astronomer John Herschel on 11 March 1831.

NGC 5378 is a LINER galaxy, i.e. a galaxy whose nucleus has an emission spectrum characterized by broad lines of weakly ionized atoms.

== NGC 5378 group ==
NGC 5378 is a member the NGC 5378 group (also known as LGG 364), which contains three galaxies, including NGC 5380 and UGC 8778.

== Supernova ==
One supernova has been observed in NGC 5378:

- SN 1991ak (Type Ia, mag. 15.5) was discovered by Swiss astronomer Paul Wild on 15 July 1991.

== See also ==
- List of NGC objects (5001–6000)
