= NGC 5127 =

Galaxy in the constellation Canes Venatici

- NGC 5127 imaged by SDSS

Observation data (J2000 epoch)
- Constellation: Canes Venatici
- Right ascension: 13^{h} 23^{m} 45.0294^{s}
- Declination: +31° 33′ 56.870″
- Redshift: 0.016184±0.00000876
- Heliocentric radial velocity: 4,852±3 km/s
- Distance: 223.42 ± 23.81 Mly (68.500 ± 7.300 Mpc)
- Group or cluster: NGC 5127 group (LGG 350)
- Apparent magnitude (V): 13.3g

Characteristics
- Type: E pec
- Size: ~183,200 ly (56.16 kpc) (estimated)
- Apparent size (V): 1.54′ × 1.08′

Other designations
- 2MASX J13234497+3133568, UGC 8419, MCG +05-32-013, PGC 46809, CGCG 161-042

NGC 5127 is an elliptical galaxy in the constellation of Canes Venatici. Its velocity with respect to the cosmic microwave background is 5,092±17 km/s, which corresponds to a Hubble distance of 244.9 ± 17.2 Mly (75.10 ± 5.26 Mpc). However, two non-redshift measurements give a closer mean distance of 223.42 ± 23.81 Mly (68.500 ± 7.300 Mpc). It was discovered by German-British astronomer William Herschel on 13 March 1785.

NGC 5127 is a LINER galaxy, i.e. a galaxy whose nucleus has an emission spectrum characterized by broad lines of weakly ionized atoms. It is also a radio galaxy, i.e. it has giant regions of radio emission extending well beyond its visible structure.

== Supermassive black hole ==
According to a study published in 2009 and based on the internal velocity of the galaxy measured by the Hubble Space Telescope, the mass of the supermassive black hole at the center of NGC 5127 is between 77 million and 510 million M_{☉}.

== NGC 5127 group ==
NGC 5127 is the main galaxy in a group of galaxies named after it. The NGC 5127 group (also known as LGG 350) has at least 10 galaxies, including NGC 5166, UGC 8392, UGC 8397, UGC 8426, UGC 8451, UGC 8496, UGC 8517, CGCG 161-20, and CGCG 161-41.

== Supernovae ==
Two supernovae has been observed in NGC 5127:

- SN 1991bi (Type Ia, mag. 18.5) was discovered by Christian Pollas on 13 December 1991.
- SN 2026abxl (Type Ia, mag. 15.4554) was discovered by the Zwicky Transient Facility on 16 September 2026.

== See also ==
- List of NGC objects (5001–6000)
