= PGC 41051 =

Spiral galaxy

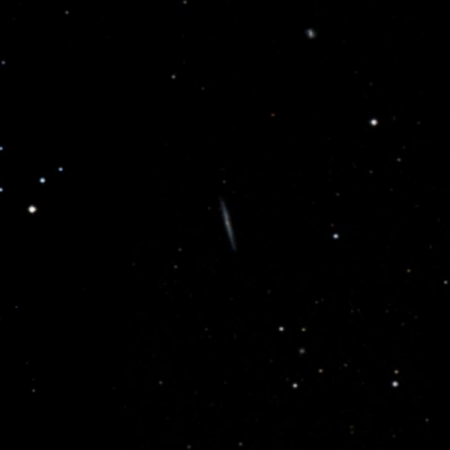

Observation data (J2000.0 epoch)
- Constellation: Canes Venatici
- Right ascension: 12^{h} 28^{m}
- Declination: +31° 28′
- Apparent magnitude (B): 16.50

Characteristics
- Type: Spiral Galaxy
- Apparent size (V): 1.1 × 0.1 arcminute

Other designations
- PGC 41051, UGC 7604

PGC 41051, also catalogued as UGC 7604, is a faint spiral galaxy situated in the constellation Canes Venatici in the northern sky. It is listed in major astronomical catalogues including the Uppsala General Catalogue (UGC) and the Principal Galaxies Catalogue (PGC), which are widely used professional references for positional and morphological galaxy data.

The galaxy is classified as a late-type spiral of morphological type Sc, indicating loosely wound spiral arms and a relatively small central bulge. Its equatorial coordinates are approximately right ascension 12h 28m 36s and declination +31° 28′55″ (J2000), placing it within the internationally defined boundaries of Canes Venatici.

Photometric data indicate that UGC 7604 is intrinsically faint, with an apparent blue magnitude estimated in the range of 15.8–16.5. At this brightness level, the galaxy is not visible to the naked eye and is a challenging target for amateur visual observation, typically requiring long-exposure imaging or professional survey data.

The apparent angular size of the galaxy is small and highly elongated. Catalogue measurements give dimensions of approximately 1.1–1.2 arcminutes along the major axis and about 0.1 arcminutes along the minor axis, suggesting that the galaxy is viewed nearly edge-on from Earth. This geometry is consistent with its late-type spiral classification.

For galaxies of this faintness and limited angular extent, detailed physical parameters such as distance, redshift, or star formation rate are not consistently available in the published literature. As a result, UGC 7604 is primarily documented through aggregated survey catalogues rather than targeted observational studies, contributing to statistical analyses of spiral galaxy populations rather than individual case studies.
