= NGC 4583 =

Lenticular galaxy

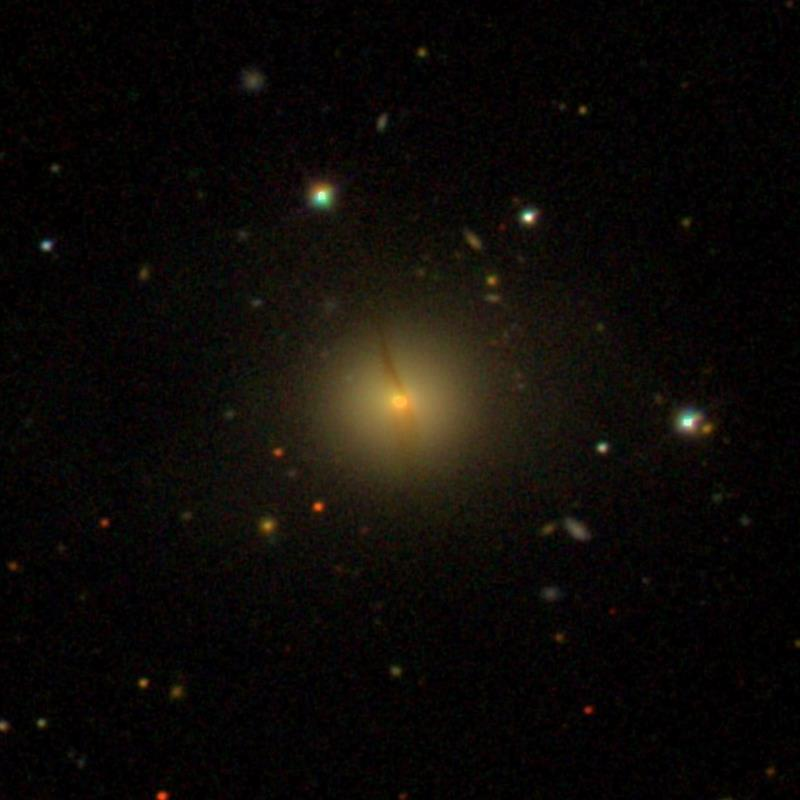
- NGC 4583 (SDSS DR14)

Observation data
- Constellation: Canes Venatici
- Right ascension: 12^{h} 38^{m} 04.5321^{s}
- Declination: +33° 27′ 31.722″

Characteristics
- Type: SB0-a

Other designations
- CGCG 188-011 CGCG 1235.6+3344 MCG +06-28-017 WISEA J123804.53+332731.7

NGC 4583 is a lenticular galaxy located in the constellation Canes Venatici. It was discovered on January 2, 1786 by the astronomer William Herschel.
