= NGC 5410 =

Galaxy in the constellation Canes Venatici

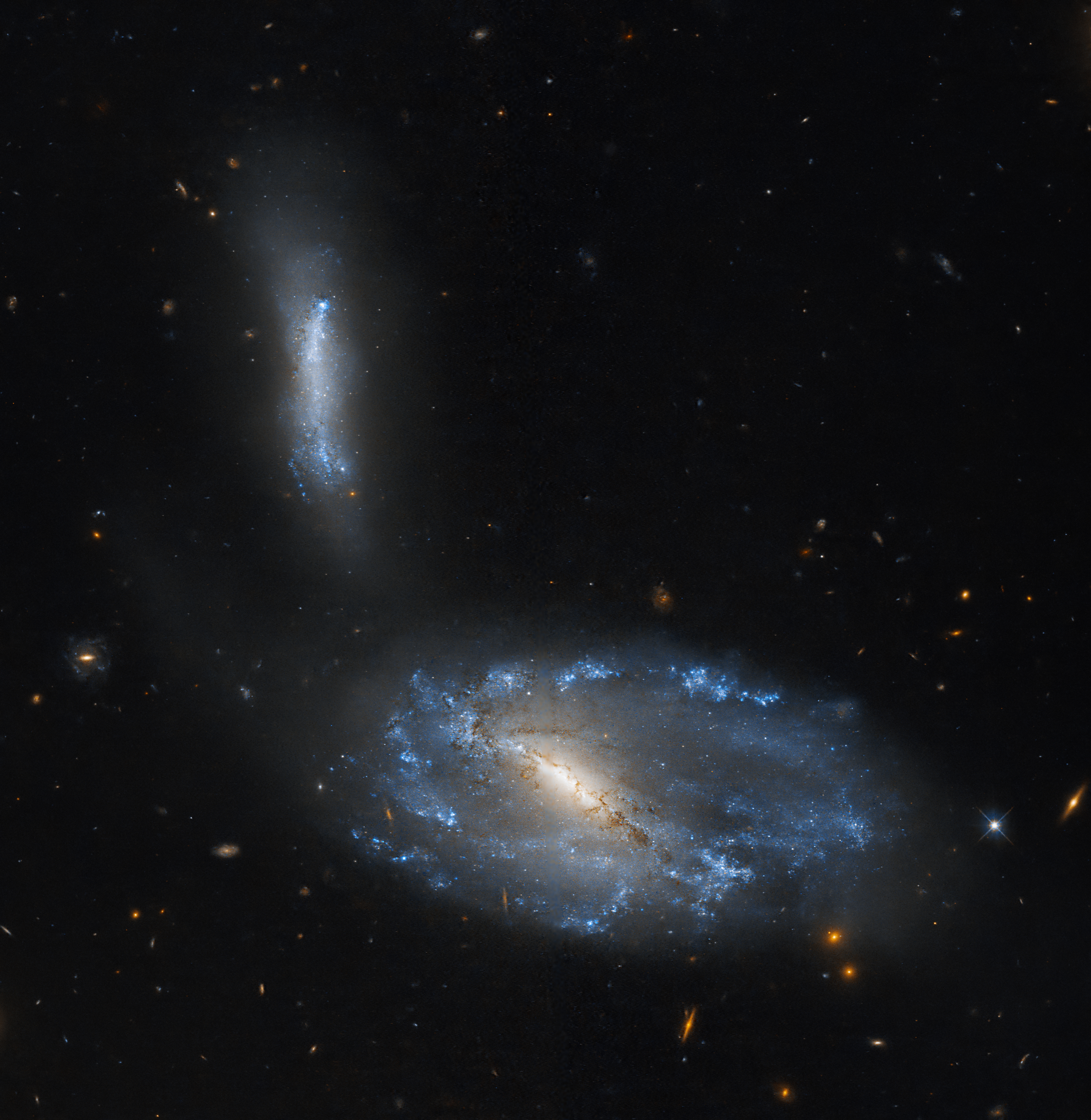
- NGC 5410 imaged by Hubble Space Telescope

Observation data (J2000 epoch)
- Constellation: Canes Venatici
- Right ascension: 14^{h} 00^{m} 54.5858^{s}
- Declination: +40° 59′ 18.532″
- Redshift: 0.012431 ± 0.000007
- Heliocentric radial velocity: 3,727 ± 2 km/s
- Distance: 192 ± 13.4 Mly (58.8 ± 4.1 Mpc)
- Apparent magnitude (V): 13.2

Characteristics
- Type: SB?
- Size: ~89,000 ly (27.4 kpc) (estimated)
- Apparent size (V): 1.38′ × 0.68′
- Notable features: Interacting galaxy

Other designations
- IRAS 13588+4113, UGC 8931, MCG +07-29-034, PGC 49893, CGCG 219-041, VV 256a

NGC 5410 is a barred spiral galaxy in the constellation Canes Venatici. The galaxy lies about 190 million light years away from Earth, which means, given its apparent dimensions, that NGC 5410 is approximately 90,000 light years across. It was discovered by William Herschel on April 9, 1787.

The galaxy is asymmetric, with an eccentric bar. Two spiral arms emerge from the ends of the bar. There are many knots along its spiral arms. The knots contain large numbers of young stars and star clusters. Nils Bergvall claimed that the outer structure of the galaxy looked more like a collisional ring, a ring-like structure created by the interaction of the spiral galaxy with its companion. However more observations of the galaxy indicate that its morphology is more indicative of disturbed spiral arms of barred galaxy than of a ring. H-alpha emission is observed along the galaxy. The star formation rate of the galaxy based on the far infrared emission is about 1.34 M_{☉} per year. The nucleus of the galaxy was not detected in X-rays by Einstein Observatory.

One supernova has been detected in NGC 5410, SN 2014as. It was discovered by D. Grennan on 18 April 2014 at an apparent magnitude of 17.3 lying 0".2 west and 12".6 south of the centre of the galaxy. Its spectrum indicated it was a broad-lined Type Ic supernova a few days before maximum light.

NGC 5410 is interacting with a companion, UGC 8932, which lies 1.2 arcminutes to the northeast. A bridge has been found to connect the two galaxies. The pair is isolated. The closest galaxy of similar size is UGC 8917.
