= R Canum Venaticorum =

Star in the constellation Canes Venatici

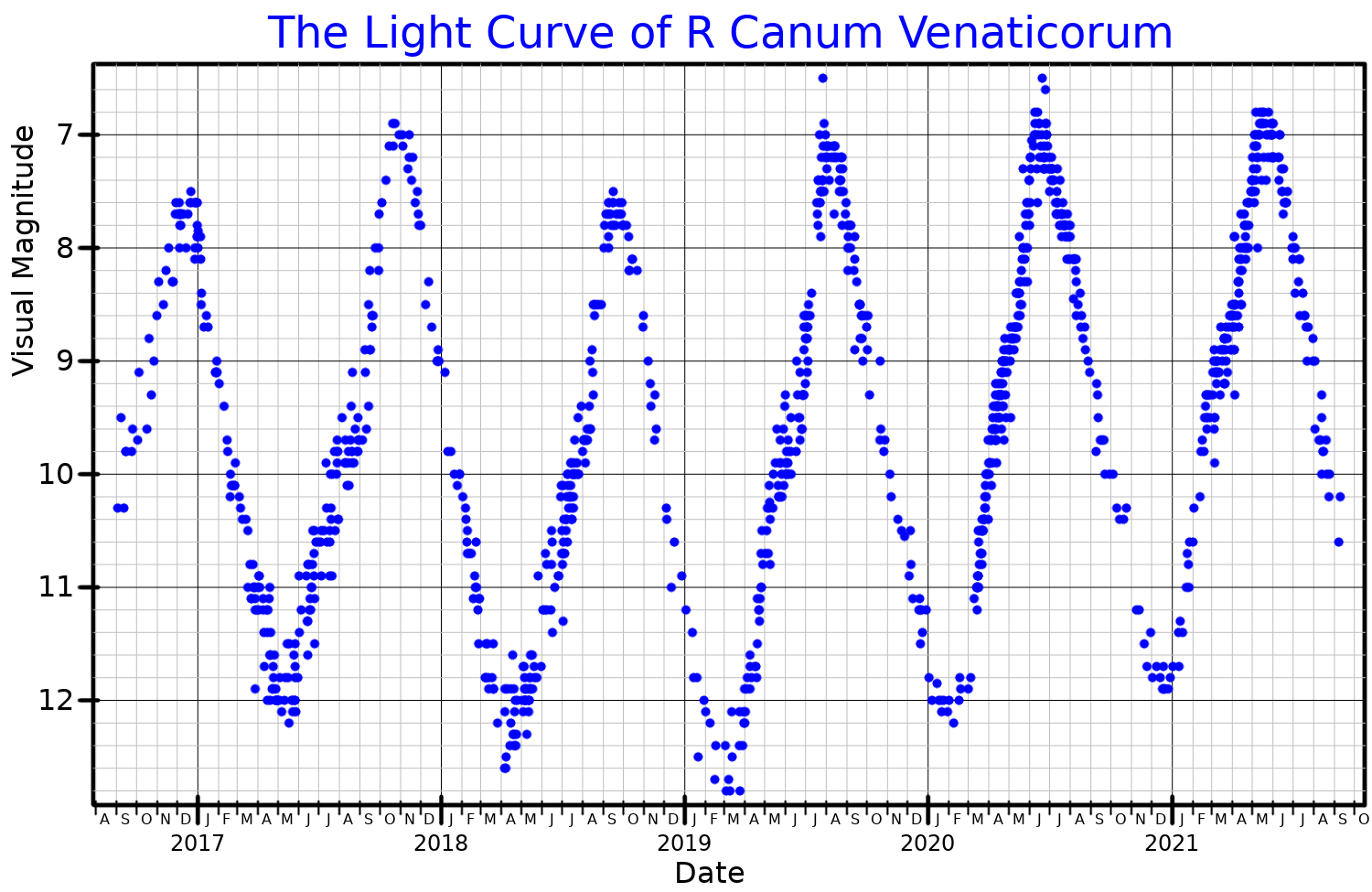
- The visual band light curve of R Canum Venaticorum, from AAVSO data

Observation data Epoch J2000 Equinox ICRS
- Constellation: Canes Venatici
- Right ascension: 13^{h} 48^{m} 57.0416^{s}
- Declination: +39° 32′ 33.174″
- Apparent magnitude (V): 6.5 - 12.9

Characteristics
- Evolutionary stage: AGB
- Spectral type: M5.5e-M9e
- U−B color index: +0.41
- B−V color index: +1.22
- Variable type: Mira

Astrometry
Radial velocity (R_{v})	−6.80 km/s
Proper motion (μ)	RA: −1.115 mas/yr Dec.: −5.148 mas/yr
Parallax (π)	2.1711±0.1262 mas
Distance	1,500 ± 90 ly (460 ± 30 pc)

Details
Mass	2.26 M_{☉}
Radius	664 R_{☉}
Luminosity	29,251 L_{☉}
Surface gravity (log g)	2.19 cgs
Temperature	3,108 K
Metallicity [Fe/H]	−0.25 dex

Other designations
- R CVn, SAO 63763, GSC 03027-00252, BD+40°2694, HD 120499, DO 14814, GC 18671, HIP 67410, HR 5199

Database references
SIMBAD	data

R Canum Venaticorum is a Mira variable star in the constellation Canes Venatici. It ranges between magnitudes 6.5 and 12.9 over a period of approximately 329 days. It is too faint to be seen with the naked eye, but when it is near its maximum brightness it can be seen with binoculars.

Thomas E. Espin discovered this variable star in 1888. It appeared with its variable star designation, R Canum Venaticorum in Annie Jump Cannon's 1907 work Second Catalogue of Variable Stars.

Having exhausted its core helium, R Canum Venaticorum is on the asymptotic giant branch, producing energy from concentric hydrogen and helium shells.
