= NGC 5395 =

Interacting spiral galaxy in the constellation Canes Venatici

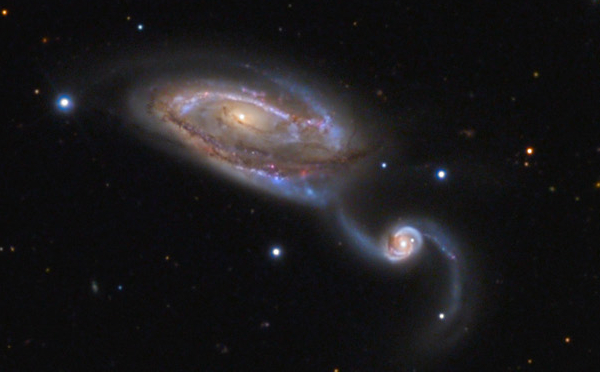
- NGC 5395 (upper left) and NGC 5394 (lower right) as taken from Mount Lemmon SkyCenter

Observation data (J2000 epoch)
- Constellation: Canes Venatici
- Right ascension: 13^{h} 58^{m} 38.0^{s}
- Declination: +37° 25′ 28″
- Redshift: 0.011711
- Heliocentric radial velocity: 3511 ± 10 km/s
- Distance: 176.8 Mly (54.22 Mpc)
- Apparent magnitude (V): 12.48
- Apparent magnitude (B): 13.26

Characteristics
- Type: SA(s)b pec

Other designations
- NGC 5395, UGC 8900, MCG +06-31-034, PGC 49747

NGC 5395 is an interacting spiral galaxy located at a distance of 160 million light years, but receding away from the Earth at 3511 kilometers (2181.6 miles) per second, in the constellation Canes Venatici. It was discovered by William Herschel on May 16, 1787. NGC 5395 and NGC 5394 are included in the Atlas of Peculiar Galaxies as Arp 84 in the category "Spiral galaxies with large high surface brightness companions".

NGC 5395 is the larger spiral galaxy interacting with smaller barred spiral galaxy, NGC 5394. NGC 5395 is nearly face-on, with a diameter of around 140,000 light-years across. NGC 5395 has a bright central region and is distorted due to the interaction with NGC 5394. The larger of the two rings around the galaxy forms a ring off the center of the galaxy. Dust lanes can be seen throughout the galaxy.

NGC 5394 is the smaller barred spiral galaxy interacting with larger spiral galaxy, NGC 5395. NGC 5394 has an oval disk, with a diameter of around 90 thousand light years across. It is also located at a distance of 160 million light-years across but receding away from the Earth at a distance of 3448 kilometers (2142.4 miles) per second. Most of the gas is concentrated at the center of the galaxy, however, two out of the three spiral arms show no sign of ongoing star formation.

NGC 5395 is a Seyfert 2 galaxy.

== Supernova ==
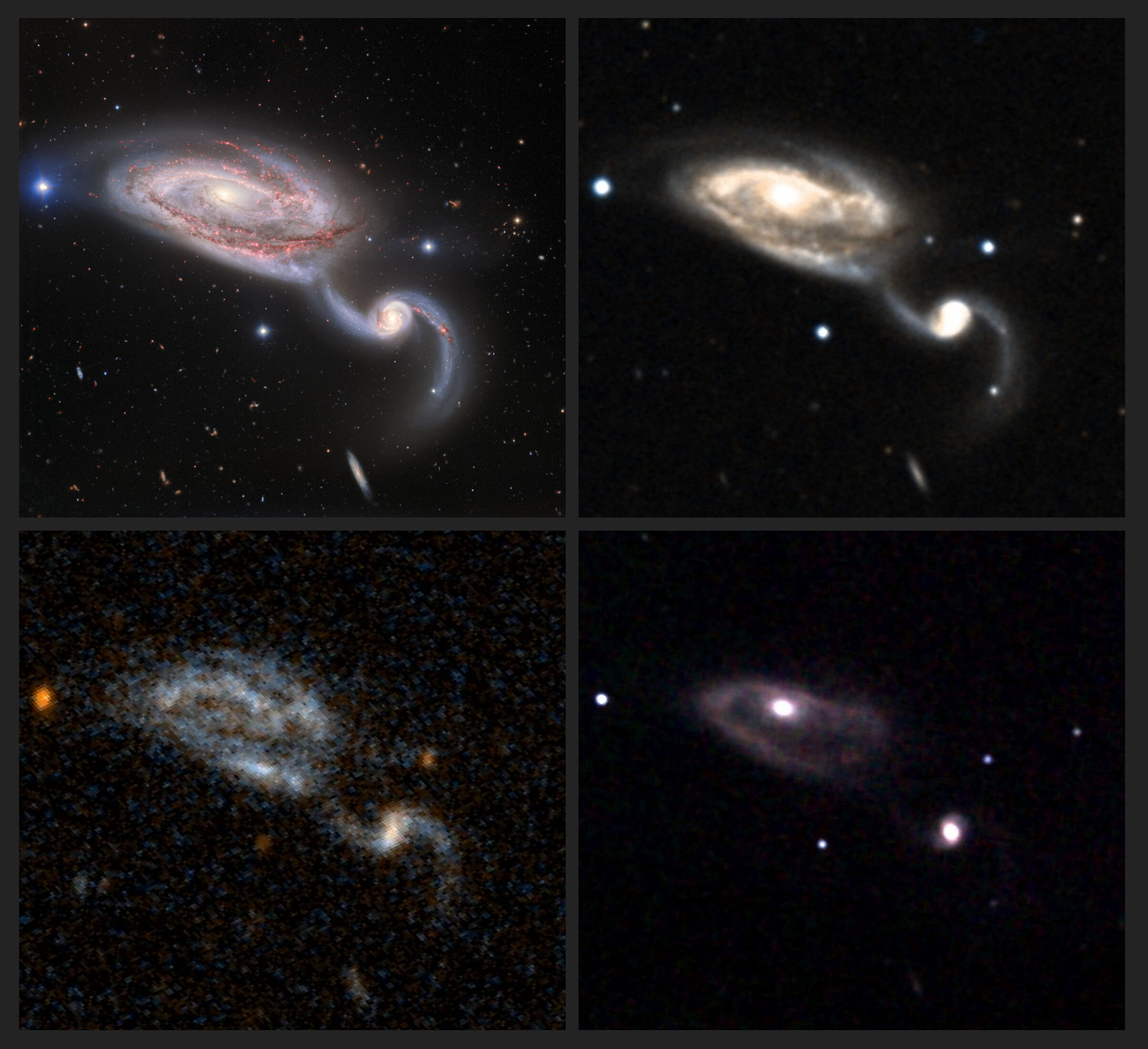
This montage illustrates how the Aladin Lite exploration tool can be used on the NOIRLab website to view and compare images of the same astronomical object, in different wavelengths of light and from different observatories.

One supernova has been detected in NGC 5395, Type Ic supernova SN 2000cr. It was discovered on June 25.90 and 25.94 (UTC) at magnitude 17.0 lying northeast of the nucleus.

== See also ==
- List of NGC objects (5001–6000)
