= NGC 4631 =

Galaxy in the constellation Canes Venatici

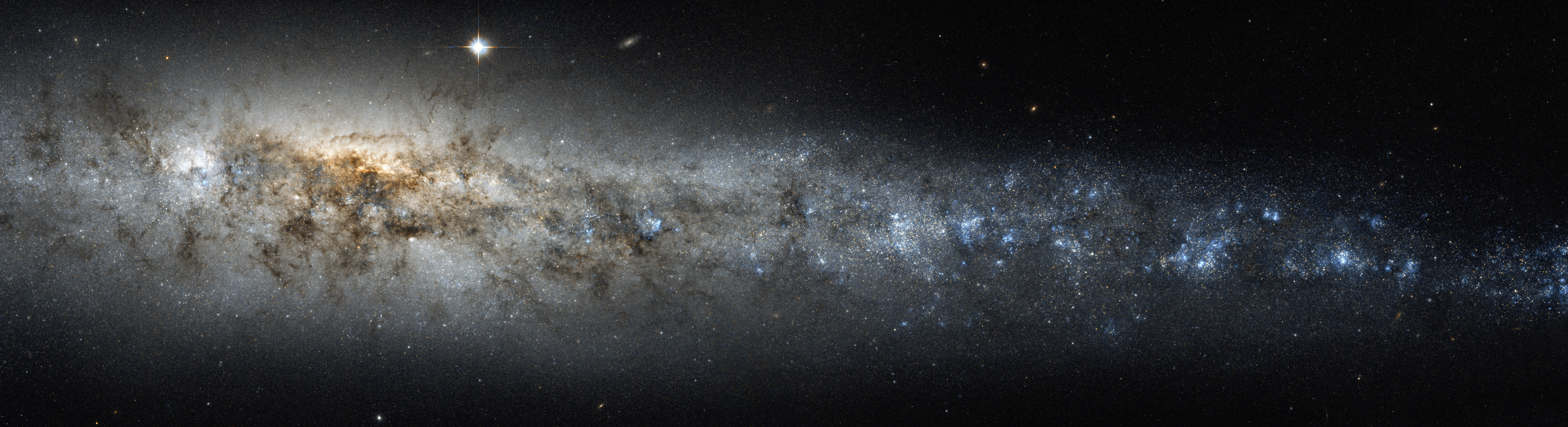
- An image of NGC 4631 taken with Hubble Space Telescope

Observation data (J2000 epoch)
- Constellation: Canes Venatici
- Right ascension: 12^{h} 42^{m} 08.0^{s}
- Declination: +32° 32′ 29″
- Redshift: 606±3 km/s
- Distance: 30 Mly (9.2 Mpc)
- Apparent magnitude (V): 9.0

Characteristics
- Type: SB(s)d
- Apparent size (V): 15.5′ × 2.8′
- Notable features: edge-on

Other designations
- Whale Galaxy, NGC 4631, Arp 281, UGC 7865, PGC 42637, Caldwell 32

NGC 4631 is a barred spiral galaxy in the constellation of Canes Venatici about 30 million light years away from Earth. Alternatively, it is known as the Whale Galaxy or Caldwell 32. It was discovered on 20 March 1787 by German-British astronomer William Herschel. This galaxy's slightly distorted wedge shape gives it the appearance of a herring or a whale, hence its nickname. Because this nearby galaxy is seen edge-on from Earth, professional astronomers observe this galaxy to better understand the gas and stars located outside the plane of the galaxy.

== Starburst and superwind ==
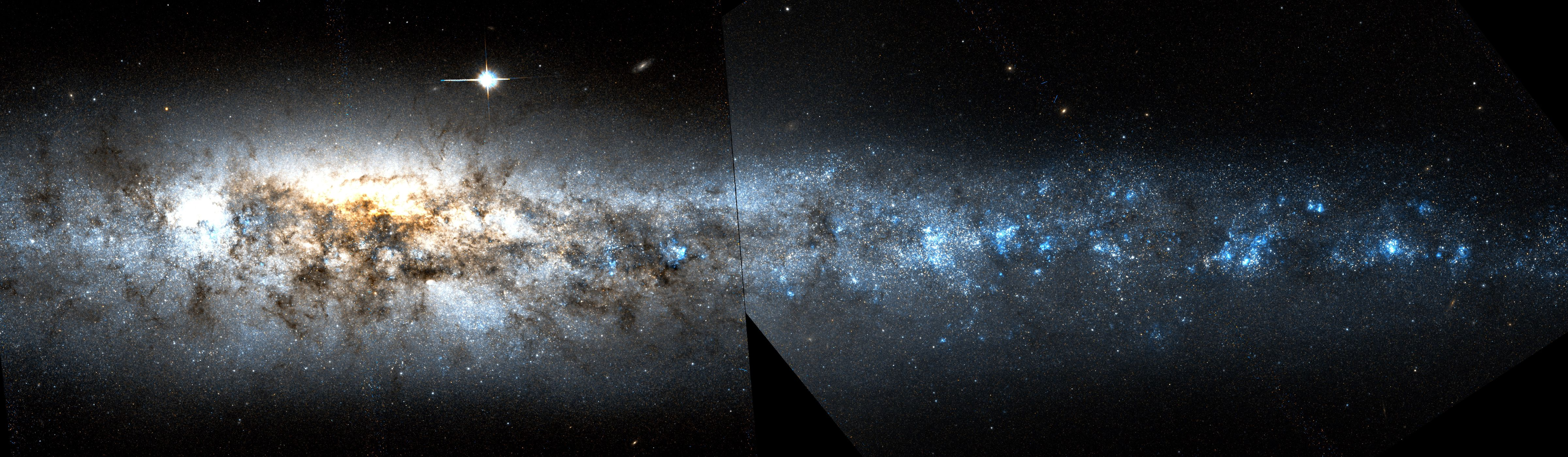
NGC 4631 mosaic of two HST images; 7.2′x2′ view

NGC 4631 contains a central starburst, which is a region of intense star formation. The strong star formation is evident in the emission from ionized hydrogen and interstellar dust heated by the stars formed in the starburst. The most massive stars that form in star formation regions only burn hydrogen gas through fusion for a short period of time, after which they explode as supernovae. So many supernovae have exploded in the center of NGC 4631 that they are blowing gas out of the plane of the galaxy. This superwind can be seen in X-rays and in spectral line emission. The gas from this superwind has produced a giant, diffuse corona of hot, X-ray emitting gas around the whole galaxy.

== Luminous red nova ==
Although no supernovae have been observed in NGC 4631 yet, a luminous red nova, designated AT 2021biy (type LRN, mag. 18.1), was discovered by ATLAS on 29 January 2021. The progenitor was either a luminous yellow supergiant or, most likely, a binary with a primary that had a mass of 17-24 M_{☉}. Luminous red novae have two peaks, with the second peak resembling a plateau. The plateau for AT 2021biy had the longest plateau observed to date, with a duration of 210 days.

== Nearby galaxies and galaxy group ==
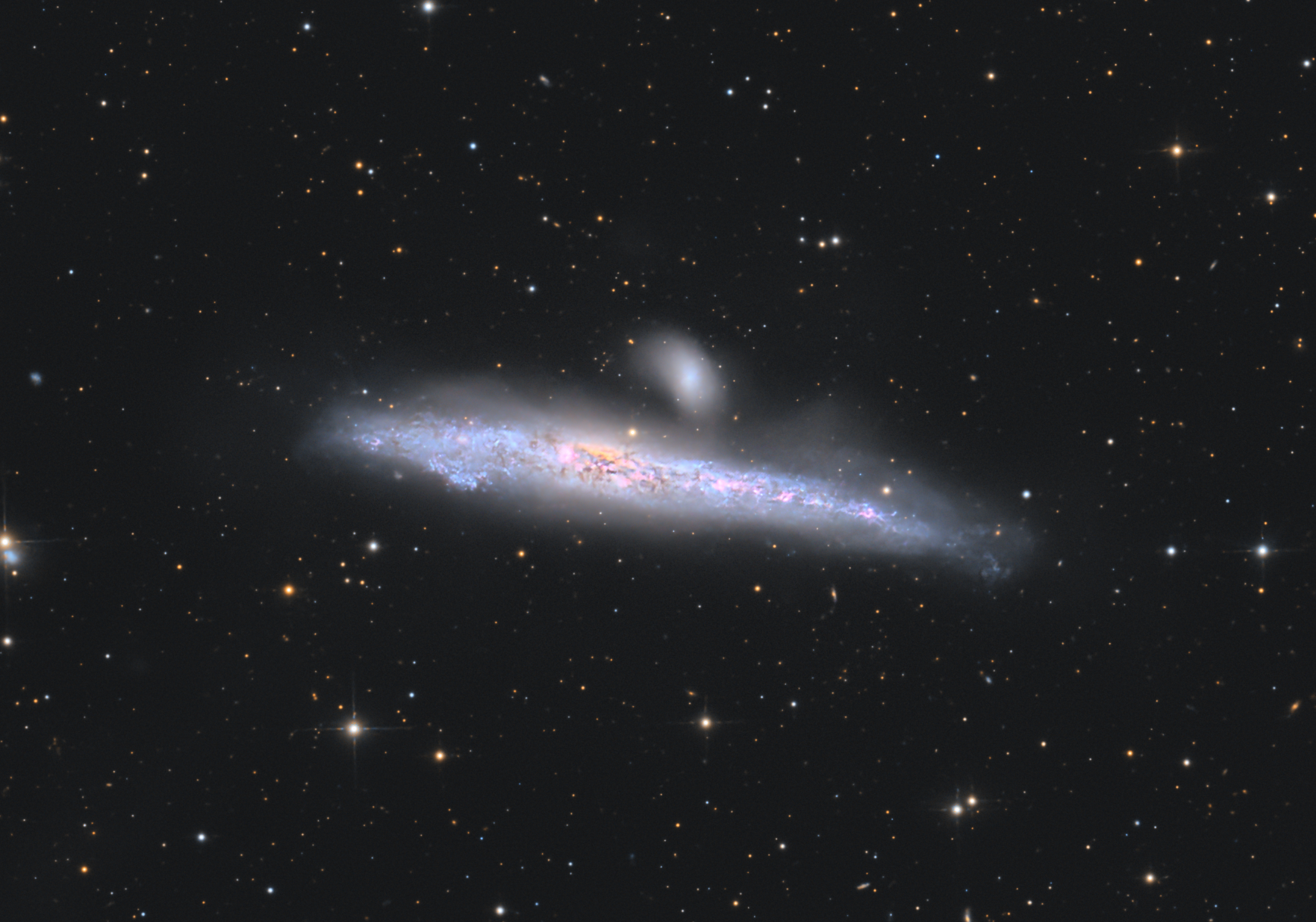
NGC 4631 (magnitude 10) + NGC 4627 (magnitude 13)

NGC 4631 has a nearby companion dwarf elliptical galaxy, NGC 4627. NGC 4627 and NGC 4631 together were listed in the Atlas of Peculiar Galaxies as an example of a "double galaxy" or a galaxy pair.

NGC 4631 and NGC 4627 are part of the NGC 4631 Group, a group of galaxies that also includes the interacting galaxies NGC 4656 and NGC 4657. However, exact group identification is problematic because this galaxy and others lie in a part of the sky that is relatively crowded. Estimates of the number of galaxies in this group range from 5 to 27, and all studies identify very different member galaxies for this group.

== See also ==
- NGC 253, a similar edge-on spiral galaxy
- NGC 891, a similar edge-on spiral galaxy
- NGC 4565, a similar edge-on spiral galaxy
- NGC 5907, a similar edge-on spiral galaxy
- List of NGC objects (4001–5000)
