= NGC 4707 =

Galaxy in constellation Canes Venatici

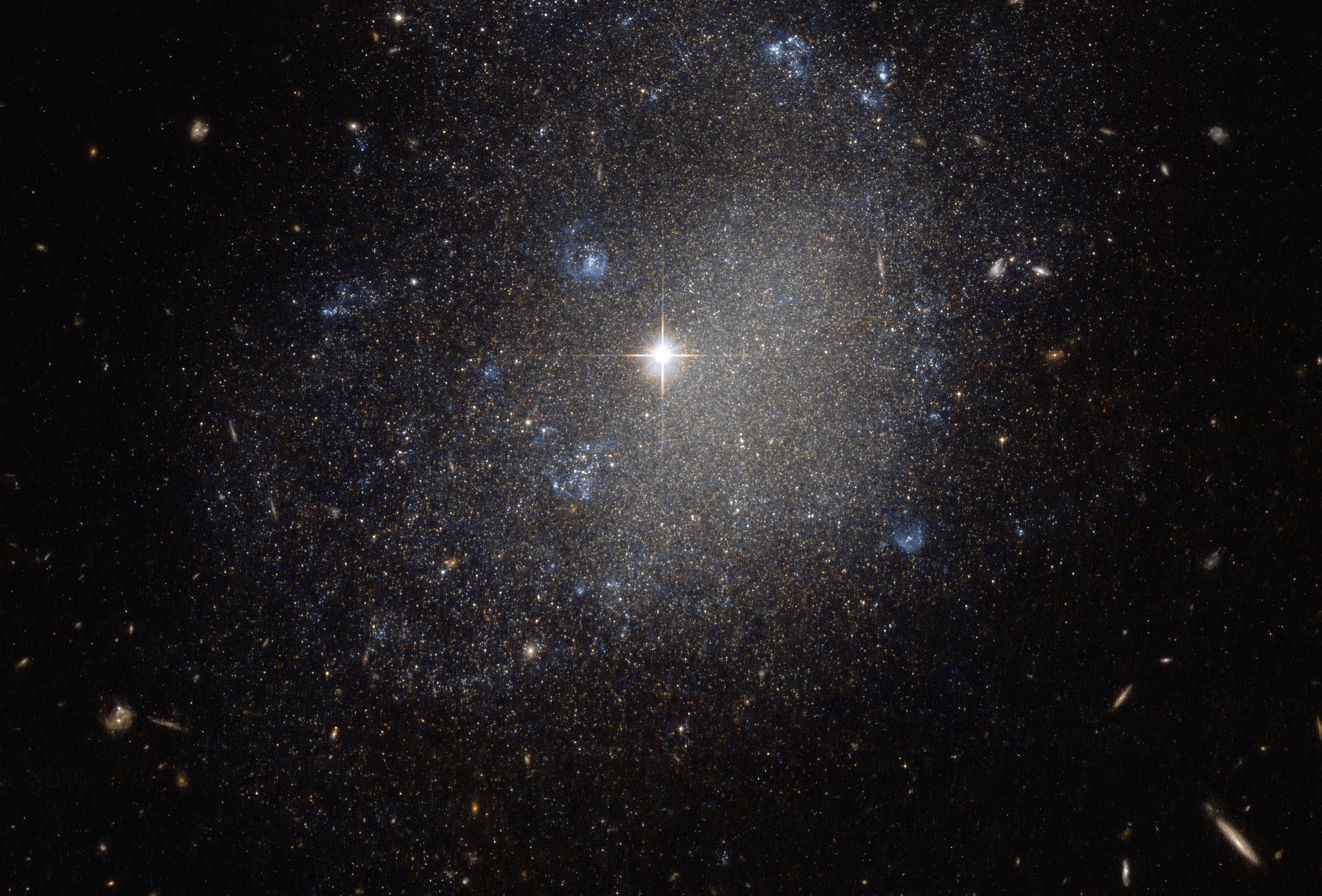
- NGC 4707, imaged by the Hubble Space Telescope

Observation data (J2000 epoch)
- Constellation: Canes Venatici
- Right ascension: 12^{h} 48^{m} 21.666^{s}
- Declination: +51° 09′ 53.81″
- Redshift: 0.001561
- Heliocentric radial velocity: 468 km/s
- Distance: 22.11 ± 3.64 Mly (6.780 ± 1.116 Mpc)
- Apparent magnitude (V): 12.91
- Apparent magnitude (B): 15.2
- Absolute magnitude (V): -16.23

Characteristics
- Type: Sm/Im
- Size: 16,100 ly (4,930 pc)
- Apparent size (V): 1.120′ × 1.045′

Other designations
- UGC 7971, MCG+09-21-050, PGC 43255, DDO 150

NGC 4707 is an irregular galaxy in the constellation of Canes Venatici. It was discovered by German-British astronomer William Herschel on 26 April 1789, and described by John Louis Emil Dreyer, the compiler of the New General Catalogue, as a "small, stellar" galaxy.

NGC 4707 has a morphological type of Sm or Im, meaning that it is mostly irregular or has very weak spiral arms. The galaxy was imaged by the Hubble Space Telescope in 2016. The image showed the galaxy had little to no signs of a central bulge or any prominent structures (typical of Magellanic-type spirals). However, the telescope could resolve many stars, as well as several turquoise-colored star forming regions.

== Gallery ==
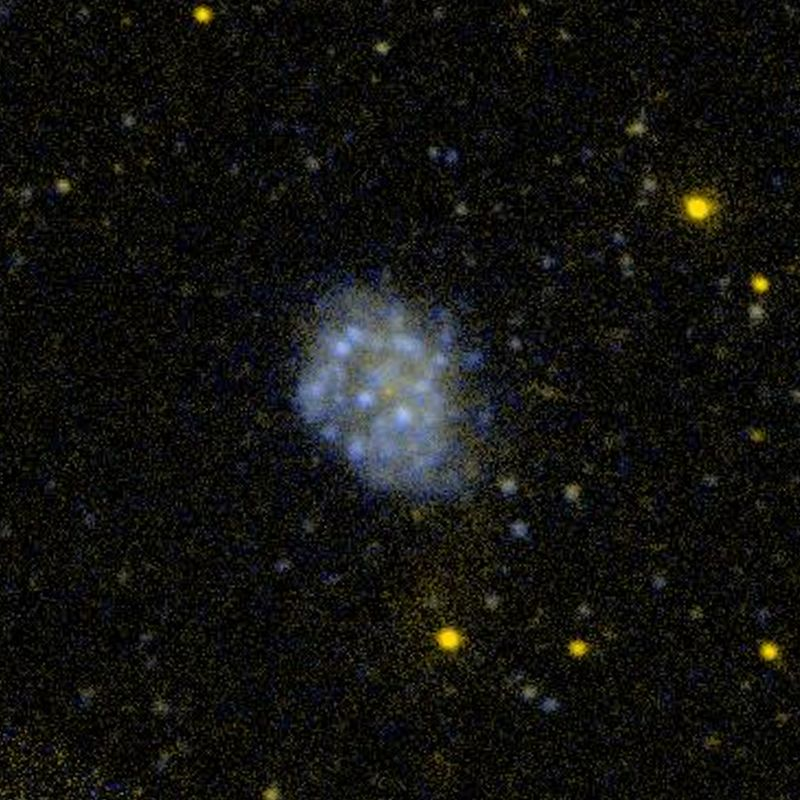
NGC 4707 by GALEX

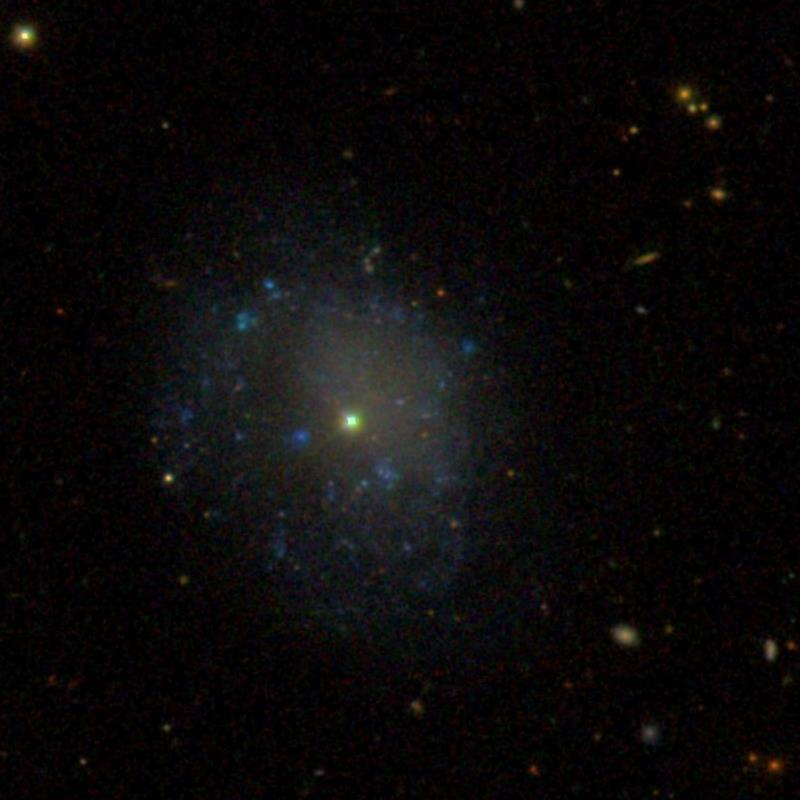
NGC 4707 (SDSS DR14)
