= NGC 4627 =

Elliptical galaxy in constellation Canes Venatici

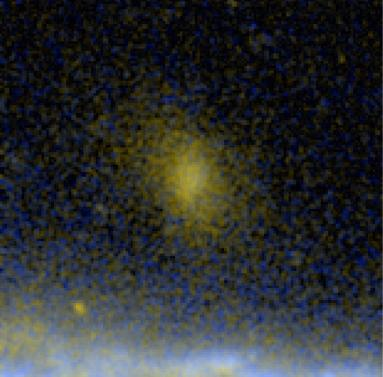
- An ultraviolet image of NGC 4627 taken by GALEX.

Observation data (J2000 epoch)
- Constellation: Canes Venatici
- Right ascension: 12^{h} 41^{m} 59.7^{s}
- Declination: +32° 34′ 25″
- Redshift: 542 ± 16 km/s
- Distance: 30.3 Mly
- Apparent magnitude (V): 13.1

Characteristics
- Type: E4 pec
- Apparent size (V): 2.6′ × 1.8′

Other designations
- UGC 7860, PGC 42620

NGC 4627 is a dwarf elliptical galaxy in the constellation Canes Venatici. The galaxy lies about 30 million light years away from Earth. NGC 4627 is located 3 arcminutes northwest of the nucleus of NGC 4631, a spiral galaxy which interacts with it.
