= NGC 646 =

Galaxy in the constellation Hydrus

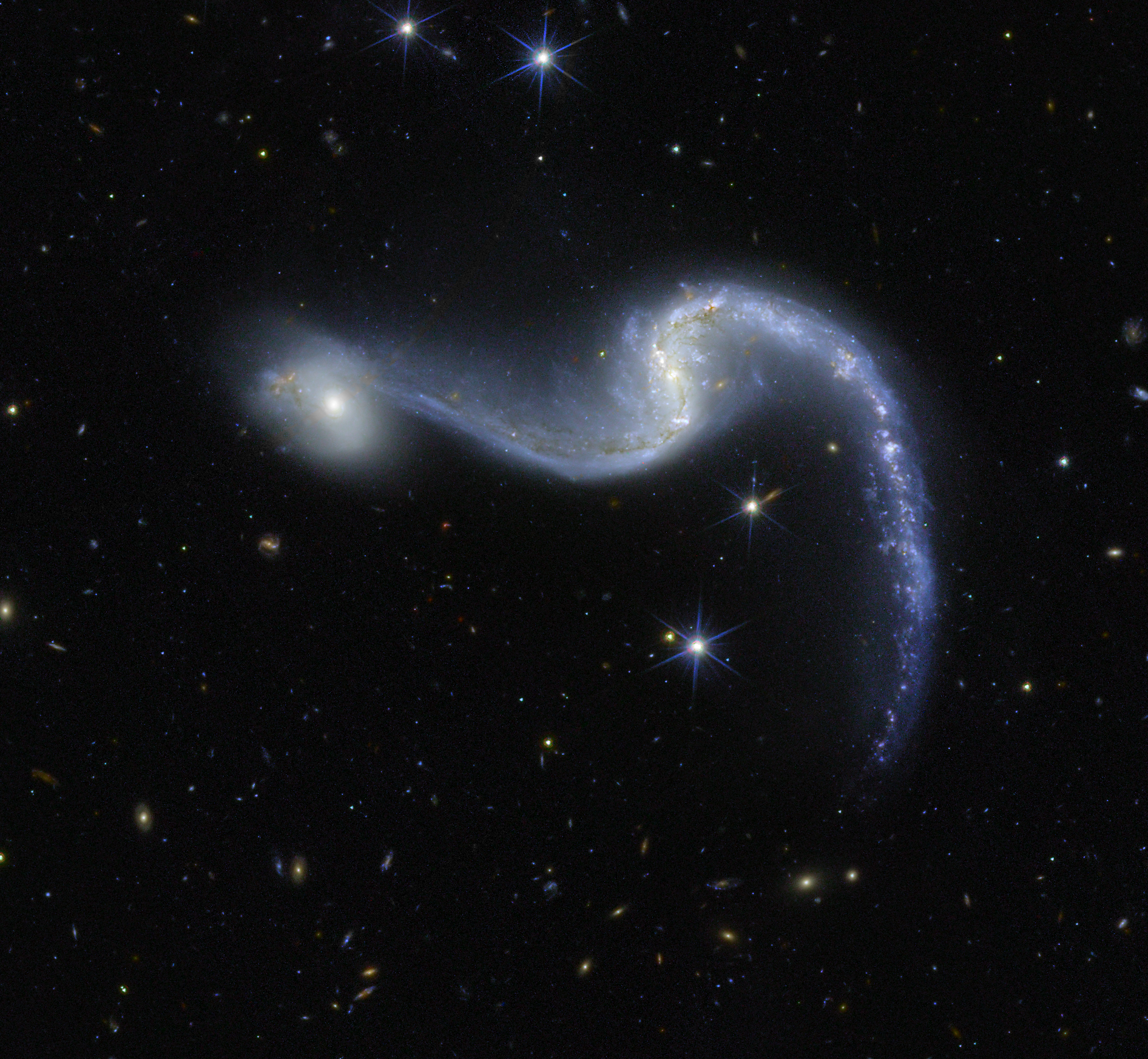
- NGC 646 (right) with PGC 6014 (left) imaged by the Euclid Space Telescope

Observation data (J2000 epoch)
- Constellation: Hydrus
- Right ascension: 01^{h} 37^{m} 21.1730^{s}
- Declination: −64° 53′ 40.499″
- Redshift: 0.027452±0.0000600
- Heliocentric radial velocity: 8,230±18 km/s
- Distance: 391.8 ± 27.5 Mly (120.13 ± 8.42 Mpc)
- Apparent magnitude (B): 15.65
- Surface brightness: 22.53 mag/arcsec2

Characteristics
- Type: SAB(s)c pec?

Other designations
- PGC 6010, VV 443

NGC 646 is a large barred spiral galaxy located in the constellation Hydrus. Its speed relative to the cosmic microwave background is 8,145 ± 19 km/s, which corresponds to a Hubble distance of 120.1 ± 8.4 Mpc (~392 million ly). NGC 646 was discovered by British astronomer John Herschel on 2 November 1834. It forms an interacting galaxy pair.

== Luminosity ==
The luminosity class of NGC 646 is III. It has surface brightness equal to 14.69 mag/am2. NGC 646 is a low surface brightness galaxy (LSB). LSB galaxies are diffuse (D) galaxies with a surface brightness less than one magnitude lower than that of the ambient night sky.

== Distance ==
The Hubble distance of PGC 6014, the galaxy to the east of NGC 646, is 106.4 ± 7.5 Mpc (~347 million ly). A distance of approximately 45 million light years therefore separates these two galaxies which appear to be neighbors in the image. Their gravitational interaction, if there is any interaction, should therefore be of short duration.

== See also ==
- List of NGC objects (1–1000)
- Interacting galaxy
