= List of minor planets: 545001–546000 =

The following is a partial list of minor planets, running from minor-planet number 545001 through 546000, inclusive. The primary data for this and other partial lists is based on JPL's "Small-Body Orbital Elements" and data available from the Minor Planet Center. Critical list information is also provided by the MPC, unless otherwise specified from Lowell Observatory. A detailed description of the table's columns and additional sources are given on the main page including a complete list of every page in this series, and a statistical break-up on the dynamical classification of minor planets.

Also see the summary list of all named bodies in numerical and alphabetical order, and the corresponding naming citations for the number range of this particular list. New namings may only be added to this list after official publication, as the preannouncement of names is condemned by the Working Group for Small Bodies Nomenclature of the International Astronomical Union.

Near-Earth obj.	MBA (inner)	MBA (outer)	Centaur
Mars-crosser	MBA (middle)	Jupiter trojan	Trans-Neptunian obj.
Unclassified

== 545001–545100 ==
Designation			Discovery			Properties		Ref
Permanent	Provisional	Named after	Date	Site	Discoverer(s)	Category	Diam.	Ref
545001	2014 XY_{10}	—	October 26, 2014	Haleakala	Pan-STARRS 1	·	1.5 km	MPC · JPL
545002	2014 XG_{13}	—	May 7, 2007	Kitt Peak	Spacewatch	·	2.4 km	MPC · JPL
545003	2014 XK_{13}	—	October 24, 2003	Kitt Peak	Spacewatch	·	2.2 km	MPC · JPL
545004	2014 XO_{13}	—	July 16, 2013	Haleakala	Pan-STARRS 1	MAR	860 m	MPC · JPL
545005	2014 XP_{14}	—	April 2, 2011	Mount Lemmon	Mount Lemmon Survey	EOS	1.5 km	MPC · JPL
545006	2014 XF_{16}	—	December 6, 2005	Kitt Peak	Spacewatch	(18466)	2.0 km	MPC · JPL
545007	2014 XH_{17}	—	October 10, 2008	Mount Lemmon	Mount Lemmon Survey	·	2.2 km	MPC · JPL
545008	2014 XQ_{17}	—	November 4, 2005	Kitt Peak	Spacewatch	·	1.7 km	MPC · JPL
545009	2014 XU_{17}	—	December 20, 2009	Kitt Peak	Spacewatch	·	2.5 km	MPC · JPL
545010	2014 XS_{20}	—	December 10, 2010	Mount Lemmon	Mount Lemmon Survey	·	1.8 km	MPC · JPL
545011	2014 XS_{22}	—	November 10, 2005	Kitt Peak	Spacewatch	·	1.5 km	MPC · JPL
545012	2014 XE_{23}	—	March 13, 2012	Kitt Peak	Spacewatch	·	1.6 km	MPC · JPL
545013	2014 XG_{23}	—	December 21, 2005	Kitt Peak	Spacewatch	·	1.8 km	MPC · JPL
545014	2014 XE_{24}	—	November 26, 2014	Haleakala	Pan-STARRS 1	·	1.5 km	MPC · JPL
545015	2014 XY_{24}	—	March 26, 2011	Mount Lemmon	Mount Lemmon Survey	·	2.5 km	MPC · JPL
545016	2014 XT_{25}	—	November 23, 2014	Haleakala	Pan-STARRS 1	EUN	970 m	MPC · JPL
545017	2014 XU_{25}	—	November 6, 2010	Mount Lemmon	Mount Lemmon Survey	·	1.6 km	MPC · JPL
545018	2014 XF_{26}	—	December 11, 2014	Mount Lemmon	Mount Lemmon Survey	·	2.9 km	MPC · JPL
545019	2014 XO_{26}	—	September 14, 2013	Haleakala	Pan-STARRS 1	·	2.9 km	MPC · JPL
545020	2014 XB_{27}	—	September 3, 2013	Elena Remote	Oreshko, A.	·	2.1 km	MPC · JPL
545021	2014 XF_{29}	—	December 10, 2010	Mount Lemmon	Mount Lemmon Survey	·	2.0 km	MPC · JPL
545022	2014 XG_{29}	—	November 20, 2014	Haleakala	Pan-STARRS 1	EOS	1.9 km	MPC · JPL
545023	2014 XN_{33}	—	September 29, 2005	Kitt Peak	Spacewatch	·	1.5 km	MPC · JPL
545024	2014 XY_{33}	—	November 16, 2014	Mount Lemmon	Mount Lemmon Survey	·	1.1 km	MPC · JPL
545025	2014 XO_{34}	—	November 22, 2006	Mount Lemmon	Mount Lemmon Survey	·	1.3 km	MPC · JPL
545026	2014 XK_{36}	—	May 8, 2011	Mount Lemmon	Mount Lemmon Survey	·	2.8 km	MPC · JPL
545027	2014 XP_{36}	—	December 15, 2014	Mount Lemmon	Mount Lemmon Survey	·	2.3 km	MPC · JPL
545028	2014 XU_{36}	—	December 24, 2006	Kitt Peak	Spacewatch	·	1.6 km	MPC · JPL
545029	2014 XC_{37}	—	November 20, 2014	Mount Lemmon	Mount Lemmon Survey	H	440 m	MPC · JPL
545030	2014 XQ_{37}	—	December 15, 2009	Catalina	CSS	·	2.3 km	MPC · JPL
545031	2014 XR_{37}	—	January 19, 2004	Kitt Peak	Spacewatch	TIR	2.3 km	MPC · JPL
545032	2014 XB_{38}	—	January 17, 2004	Palomar	NEAT	·	3.2 km	MPC · JPL
545033	2014 XX_{38}	—	December 31, 2008	Mount Lemmon	Mount Lemmon Survey	·	3.3 km	MPC · JPL
545034	2014 XZ_{41}	—	December 1, 2014	Haleakala	Pan-STARRS 1	·	3.0 km	MPC · JPL
545035	2014 XA_{42}	—	May 24, 2011	Haleakala	Pan-STARRS 1	TIR	2.8 km	MPC · JPL
545036	2014 XB_{42}	—	March 13, 2011	Kitt Peak	Spacewatch	·	1.7 km	MPC · JPL
545037	2014 XL_{42}	—	February 12, 2011	Mount Lemmon	Mount Lemmon Survey	·	1.7 km	MPC · JPL
545038	2014 XO_{42}	—	November 6, 2008	Mount Lemmon	Mount Lemmon Survey	·	2.6 km	MPC · JPL
545039	2014 XC_{43}	—	October 26, 2014	7300	W. K. Y. Yeung	·	1.9 km	MPC · JPL
545040	2014 YM	—	April 19, 2013	Mount Lemmon	Mount Lemmon Survey	H	490 m	MPC · JPL
545041	2014 YE_{2}	—	January 30, 2011	Kitt Peak	Spacewatch	·	1.5 km	MPC · JPL
545042	2014 YL_{2}	—	July 14, 2013	Haleakala	Pan-STARRS 1	BRA	1.4 km	MPC · JPL
545043	2014 YM_{3}	—	November 29, 2014	Haleakala	Pan-STARRS 1	H	450 m	MPC · JPL
545044	2014 YR_{4}	—	November 10, 2014	Haleakala	Pan-STARRS 1	·	1.8 km	MPC · JPL
545045	2014 YJ_{5}	—	June 4, 2011	Mount Lemmon	Mount Lemmon Survey	·	2.7 km	MPC · JPL
545046	2014 YL_{5}	—	January 15, 2010	Kitt Peak	Spacewatch	·	1.3 km	MPC · JPL
545047	2014 YY_{5}	—	December 19, 2014	Haleakala	Pan-STARRS 1	H	580 m	MPC · JPL
545048	2014 YG_{6}	—	March 11, 2005	Kitt Peak	Spacewatch	·	1.4 km	MPC · JPL
545049	2014 YS_{6}	—	December 20, 2014	ESA OGS	ESA OGS	VER	2.6 km	MPC · JPL
545050	2014 YL_{7}	—	December 20, 2014	Kitt Peak	Spacewatch	TIR	2.4 km	MPC · JPL
545051	2014 YP_{10}	—	August 29, 2013	Haleakala	Pan-STARRS 1	·	3.1 km	MPC · JPL
545052	2014 YP_{11}	—	September 28, 2006	Mount Lemmon	Mount Lemmon Survey	MAS	600 m	MPC · JPL
545053	2014 YA_{12}	—	February 16, 2010	Mount Lemmon	Mount Lemmon Survey	·	2.0 km	MPC · JPL
545054	2014 YJ_{12}	—	September 26, 2008	Kitt Peak	Spacewatch	·	2.6 km	MPC · JPL
545055	2014 YR_{13}	—	August 22, 2014	Haleakala	Pan-STARRS 1	·	1.4 km	MPC · JPL
545056	2014 YC_{14}	—	April 13, 2004	Palomar	NEAT	T_{j} (2.94)	3.2 km	MPC · JPL
545057	2014 YK_{15}	—	November 26, 2013	Haleakala	Pan-STARRS 1	T_{j} (2.9)	4.0 km	MPC · JPL
545058	2014 YK_{16}	—	February 13, 1999	Kitt Peak	Spacewatch	·	3.6 km	MPC · JPL
545059	2014 YX_{16}	—	November 23, 2014	Mount Lemmon	Mount Lemmon Survey	EOS	1.6 km	MPC · JPL
545060 Drapáljános	2014 YN_{17}	Drapáljános	February 3, 2011	Piszkés-tető	K. Sárneczky, Z. Kuli	·	2.2 km	MPC · JPL
545061	2014 YT_{17}	—	December 16, 2006	Kitt Peak	Spacewatch	·	1.7 km	MPC · JPL
545062	2014 YZ_{17}	—	November 17, 2014	Haleakala	Pan-STARRS 1	·	2.8 km	MPC · JPL
545063	2014 YW_{18}	—	October 14, 2010	Mount Lemmon	Mount Lemmon Survey	·	1.6 km	MPC · JPL
545064	2014 YA_{19}	—	December 15, 2009	Mount Lemmon	Mount Lemmon Survey	·	1.5 km	MPC · JPL
545065	2014 YR_{19}	—	October 16, 2009	Mount Lemmon	Mount Lemmon Survey	·	1.4 km	MPC · JPL
545066	2014 YX_{20}	—	September 30, 1998	Kitt Peak	Spacewatch	EOS	1.7 km	MPC · JPL
545067	2014 YE_{21}	—	September 18, 1998	Kitt Peak	Spacewatch	·	2.6 km	MPC · JPL
545068	2014 YG_{21}	—	November 3, 2014	Mount Lemmon	Mount Lemmon Survey	EUN	1.3 km	MPC · JPL
545069	2014 YQ_{22}	—	April 14, 2011	Mount Lemmon	Mount Lemmon Survey	·	1.6 km	MPC · JPL
545070	2014 YS_{22}	—	April 29, 1998	Kitt Peak	Spacewatch	·	1.9 km	MPC · JPL
545071	2014 YC_{23}	—	November 18, 2014	Mount Lemmon	Mount Lemmon Survey	(895)	3.1 km	MPC · JPL
545072	2014 YP_{23}	—	September 5, 2008	Kitt Peak	Spacewatch	·	1.7 km	MPC · JPL
545073	2014 YF_{24}	—	August 12, 2013	Haleakala	Pan-STARRS 1	·	2.5 km	MPC · JPL
545074	2014 YN_{24}	—	October 5, 2003	Kitt Peak	Spacewatch	·	2.7 km	MPC · JPL
545075	2014 YT_{25}	—	January 8, 2010	Mount Lemmon	Mount Lemmon Survey	·	2.9 km	MPC · JPL
545076	2014 YZ_{25}	—	November 5, 2010	Mount Lemmon	Mount Lemmon Survey	(5)	1.1 km	MPC · JPL
545077	2014 YL_{26}	—	December 10, 2014	Mount Lemmon	Mount Lemmon Survey	H	530 m	MPC · JPL
545078	2014 YN_{26}	—	November 17, 2010	Mount Lemmon	Mount Lemmon Survey	·	1.5 km	MPC · JPL
545079	2014 YP_{26}	—	December 24, 2014	Mount Lemmon	Mount Lemmon Survey	EOS	1.9 km	MPC · JPL
545080	2014 YN_{27}	—	November 21, 2009	Mount Lemmon	Mount Lemmon Survey	·	3.8 km	MPC · JPL
545081	2014 YZ_{27}	—	December 30, 2005	Mount Lemmon	Mount Lemmon Survey	·	1.2 km	MPC · JPL
545082	2014 YH_{29}	—	October 27, 2009	Mount Lemmon	Mount Lemmon Survey	·	1.7 km	MPC · JPL
545083	2014 YS_{29}	—	December 24, 2014	Mount Lemmon	Mount Lemmon Survey	·	2.8 km	MPC · JPL
545084	2014 YJ_{30}	—	May 28, 2008	Mount Lemmon	Mount Lemmon Survey	H	600 m	MPC · JPL
545085	2014 YK_{30}	—	December 22, 2003	Kitt Peak	Spacewatch	·	3.1 km	MPC · JPL
545086	2014 YJ_{31}	—	November 1, 2008	Mount Lemmon	Mount Lemmon Survey	·	2.5 km	MPC · JPL
545087	2014 YR_{31}	—	February 1, 2003	Palomar	NEAT	·	1.8 km	MPC · JPL
545088	2014 YV_{31}	—	September 13, 2013	Kitt Peak	Spacewatch	·	2.2 km	MPC · JPL
545089	2014 YR_{32}	—	November 15, 2003	Kitt Peak	Spacewatch	·	1.9 km	MPC · JPL
545090	2014 YG_{33}	—	August 23, 2003	Palomar	NEAT	·	1.9 km	MPC · JPL
545091	2014 YZ_{34}	—	November 20, 2014	Mount Lemmon	Mount Lemmon Survey	H	630 m	MPC · JPL
545092	2014 YH_{36}	—	March 29, 2012	Haleakala	Pan-STARRS 1	·	1.4 km	MPC · JPL
545093	2014 YS_{36}	—	November 26, 2014	Haleakala	Pan-STARRS 1	EUN	1.2 km	MPC · JPL
545094	2014 YL_{38}	—	September 10, 2007	Mount Lemmon	Mount Lemmon Survey	·	2.7 km	MPC · JPL
545095	2014 YQ_{38}	—	September 3, 2013	Calar Alto	F. Hormuth	·	1.6 km	MPC · JPL
545096	2014 YV_{38}	—	January 7, 2005	Catalina	CSS	EOS	1.9 km	MPC · JPL
545097	2014 YX_{38}	—	December 14, 2010	Mount Lemmon	Mount Lemmon Survey	·	2.1 km	MPC · JPL
545098	2014 YY_{38}	—	December 27, 2014	Mount Lemmon	Mount Lemmon Survey	H	540 m	MPC · JPL
545099	2014 YD_{39}	—	December 3, 2014	Haleakala	Pan-STARRS 1	H	530 m	MPC · JPL
545100	2014 YP_{39}	—	January 17, 2005	Kitt Peak	Spacewatch	EOS	2.1 km	MPC · JPL

== 545101–545200 ==
back to top

Designation			Discovery			Properties		Ref
Permanent	Provisional	Named after	Date	Site	Discoverer(s)	Category	Diam.	Ref
545101	2014 YU_{39}	—	December 27, 2014	Haleakala	Pan-STARRS 1	·	1.5 km	MPC · JPL
545102	2014 YG_{40}	—	December 11, 2014	Mount Lemmon	Mount Lemmon Survey	·	1.9 km	MPC · JPL
545103	2014 YL_{43}	—	August 14, 2013	Haleakala	Pan-STARRS 1	·	2.5 km	MPC · JPL
545104	2014 YO_{43}	—	March 2, 2011	Catalina	CSS	·	2.0 km	MPC · JPL
545105	2014 YL_{46}	—	August 14, 2013	Haleakala	Pan-STARRS 1	·	2.4 km	MPC · JPL
545106	2014 YK_{47}	—	September 18, 2014	Haleakala	Pan-STARRS 1	·	2.2 km	MPC · JPL
545107	2014 YS_{47}	—	September 24, 2009	Kitt Peak	Spacewatch	·	1.6 km	MPC · JPL
545108	2014 YD_{48}	—	January 13, 2005	Kitt Peak	Spacewatch	·	2.2 km	MPC · JPL
545109	2014 YP_{48}	—	March 11, 2011	Kitt Peak	Spacewatch	(18466)	1.9 km	MPC · JPL
545110	2014 YZ_{48}	—	October 20, 2008	Kitt Peak	Spacewatch	·	3.3 km	MPC · JPL
545111	2014 YM_{50}	—	November 1, 2011	Kitt Peak	Spacewatch	H	450 m	MPC · JPL
545112	2014 YR_{50}	—	November 24, 2003	Kitt Peak	Spacewatch	H	470 m	MPC · JPL
545113	2014 YF_{51}	—	November 28, 2014	Haleakala	Pan-STARRS 1	H	510 m	MPC · JPL
545114	2014 YM_{51}	—	December 27, 2014	Haleakala	Pan-STARRS 1	H	570 m	MPC · JPL
545115	2014 YU_{53}	—	December 29, 2014	Haleakala	Pan-STARRS 1	·	2.2 km	MPC · JPL
545116	2014 YF_{54}	—	April 15, 2004	Palomar	NEAT	·	2.7 km	MPC · JPL
545117	2014 YZ_{54}	—	December 21, 2008	Kitt Peak	Spacewatch	·	2.7 km	MPC · JPL
545118	2014 YB_{55}	—	December 26, 2008	Mount Nyukasa	Japan Aerospace Exploration Agency	EOS	1.9 km	MPC · JPL
545119	2014 YS_{55}	—	October 23, 2008	Mount Lemmon	Mount Lemmon Survey	·	1.6 km	MPC · JPL
545120	2014 YC_{56}	—	December 26, 2014	Haleakala	Pan-STARRS 1	·	2.5 km	MPC · JPL
545121	2014 YB_{57}	—	September 27, 2000	Kitt Peak	Spacewatch	EUN	1.3 km	MPC · JPL
545122	2014 YJ_{57}	—	September 9, 2013	Haleakala	Pan-STARRS 1	·	1.7 km	MPC · JPL
545123	2014 YS_{57}	—	September 6, 2008	Kitt Peak	Spacewatch	·	1.7 km	MPC · JPL
545124	2014 YY_{57}	—	September 14, 2013	Mount Lemmon	Mount Lemmon Survey	TIR	2.2 km	MPC · JPL
545125	2014 YF_{58}	—	December 18, 2014	Haleakala	Pan-STARRS 1	·	2.0 km	MPC · JPL
545126	2014 YS_{60}	—	October 2, 2013	Haleakala	Pan-STARRS 1	·	1.8 km	MPC · JPL
545127	2014 YC_{61}	—	December 25, 2014	Haleakala	Pan-STARRS 1	·	2.7 km	MPC · JPL
545128	2014 YC_{62}	—	December 29, 2014	Haleakala	Pan-STARRS 1	·	2.7 km	MPC · JPL
545129	2014 YF_{62}	—	October 6, 2013	Oukaïmeden	C. Rinner	·	2.9 km	MPC · JPL
545130	2014 YT_{62}	—	October 13, 2013	Mount Lemmon	Mount Lemmon Survey	·	2.8 km	MPC · JPL
545131	2014 YY_{62}	—	February 18, 2010	Kitt Peak	Spacewatch	·	2.3 km	MPC · JPL
545132	2014 YD_{63}	—	October 9, 2007	Kitt Peak	Spacewatch	·	2.4 km	MPC · JPL
545133	2014 YF_{63}	—	December 31, 2013	Mount Lemmon	Mount Lemmon Survey	·	1.9 km	MPC · JPL
545134	2014 YA_{64}	—	November 20, 2008	Mount Lemmon	Mount Lemmon Survey	H	470 m	MPC · JPL
545135	2014 YE_{64}	—	December 21, 2014	Mount Lemmon	Mount Lemmon Survey	·	1.7 km	MPC · JPL
545136	2011 AU	—	November 21, 2006	Mount Lemmon	Mount Lemmon Survey	EUN	1.1 km	MPC · JPL
545137	2011 AQ_{2}	—	November 3, 2010	Mount Lemmon	Mount Lemmon Survey	·	1.3 km	MPC · JPL
545138	2011 AB_{15}	—	January 8, 2011	Mount Lemmon	Mount Lemmon Survey	·	1.5 km	MPC · JPL
545139	2011 AZ_{56}	—	February 22, 2002	Palomar	NEAT	JUN	1.3 km	MPC · JPL
545140	2011 AD_{69}	—	March 10, 2003	Palomar	NEAT	·	1.1 km	MPC · JPL
545141	2011 AT_{71}	—	January 14, 2011	Mount Lemmon	Mount Lemmon Survey	·	1.1 km	MPC · JPL
545142	2011 AW_{77}	—	January 13, 2011	Catalina	CSS	MAR	1.3 km	MPC · JPL
545143	2011 AG_{79}	—	September 30, 2009	Mount Lemmon	Mount Lemmon Survey	·	1.8 km	MPC · JPL
545144	2011 AV_{79}	—	February 5, 2011	Catalina	CSS	·	1.6 km	MPC · JPL
545145	2011 AA_{84}	—	March 24, 2012	Kitt Peak	Spacewatch	·	1.3 km	MPC · JPL
545146	2011 AS_{84}	—	October 4, 2013	Catalina	CSS	·	1.9 km	MPC · JPL
545147	2011 AH_{85}	—	January 13, 2011	Kitt Peak	Spacewatch	·	990 m	MPC · JPL
545148	2011 AX_{85}	—	September 19, 2014	Haleakala	Pan-STARRS 1	(1547)	1.2 km	MPC · JPL
545149	2011 AZ_{87}	—	January 10, 2011	Mount Lemmon	Mount Lemmon Survey	·	1.1 km	MPC · JPL
545150	2011 AK_{89}	—	December 29, 2011	Mount Lemmon	Mount Lemmon Survey	·	2.7 km	MPC · JPL
545151	2011 AV_{89}	—	May 12, 2013	Haleakala	Pan-STARRS 1	SYL	3.5 km	MPC · JPL
545152	2011 AW_{89}	—	January 4, 2011	Mount Lemmon	Mount Lemmon Survey	3:2	4.5 km	MPC · JPL
545153	2011 AP_{90}	—	October 28, 2017	Haleakala	Pan-STARRS 1	T_{j} (2.98) · 3:2	4.2 km	MPC · JPL
545154	2011 AC_{93}	—	January 10, 2011	Catalina	CSS	·	1.8 km	MPC · JPL
545155	2011 BF_{1}	—	December 3, 2010	Mount Lemmon	Mount Lemmon Survey	·	950 m	MPC · JPL
545156	2011 BP_{5}	—	March 20, 2007	Catalina	CSS	·	1.5 km	MPC · JPL
545157	2011 BK_{6}	—	March 23, 2003	Kitt Peak	Spacewatch	·	1.2 km	MPC · JPL
545158	2011 BP_{10}	—	December 15, 2006	Kitt Peak	Spacewatch	·	1.2 km	MPC · JPL
545159	2011 BE_{13}	—	January 24, 2011	Mount Lemmon	Mount Lemmon Survey	·	1.3 km	MPC · JPL
545160	2011 BJ_{14}	—	September 12, 2004	Kitt Peak	Spacewatch	·	1.6 km	MPC · JPL
545161	2011 BV_{16}	—	January 29, 2007	Kitt Peak	Spacewatch	·	1.4 km	MPC · JPL
545162	2011 BT_{19}	—	April 23, 2007	Catalina	CSS	·	1.8 km	MPC · JPL
545163	2011 BC_{25}	—	December 21, 2006	Palomar	NEAT	·	1.7 km	MPC · JPL
545164	2011 BX_{33}	—	February 4, 2003	Palomar	NEAT	·	1.8 km	MPC · JPL
545165	2011 BQ_{37}	—	January 28, 2011	Sandlot	G. Hug	·	950 m	MPC · JPL
545166	2011 BD_{39}	—	January 28, 2011	Haleakala	Pan-STARRS 1	T_{j} (2.93)	3.3 km	MPC · JPL
545167 Bonfini	2011 BF_{42}	Bonfini	January 30, 2011	Piszkéstető	K. Sárneczky, S. Kürti	·	900 m	MPC · JPL
545168	2011 BX_{42}	—	November 1, 2005	Kitt Peak	Spacewatch	·	1.1 km	MPC · JPL
545169	2011 BT_{44}	—	January 30, 2011	Piszkés-tető	K. Sárneczky, Z. Kuli	(1547)	1.7 km	MPC · JPL
545170	2011 BW_{44}	—	January 30, 2011	Piszkés-tető	K. Sárneczky, Z. Kuli	·	1.2 km	MPC · JPL
545171	2011 BE_{45}	—	January 29, 2011	Kachina	Hobart, J.	H	550 m	MPC · JPL
545172	2011 BG_{52}	—	April 9, 2003	Palomar	NEAT	(5)	1.0 km	MPC · JPL
545173	2011 BJ_{53}	—	January 30, 2011	Mount Lemmon	Mount Lemmon Survey	·	1.1 km	MPC · JPL
545174	2011 BQ_{56}	—	January 25, 2011	Mount Lemmon	Mount Lemmon Survey	·	860 m	MPC · JPL
545175	2011 BL_{61}	—	January 4, 2011	Mount Lemmon	Mount Lemmon Survey	RAF	760 m	MPC · JPL
545176	2011 BN_{63}	—	January 28, 2011	Kitt Peak	Spacewatch	3:2	4.6 km	MPC · JPL
545177	2011 BS_{65}	—	February 1, 2011	Piszkés-tető	K. Sárneczky, Z. Kuli	·	1.1 km	MPC · JPL
545178	2011 BP_{66}	—	February 1, 2011	Piszkés-tető	K. Sárneczky, Z. Kuli	·	1.2 km	MPC · JPL
545179	2011 BC_{74}	—	March 11, 2007	Mount Lemmon	Mount Lemmon Survey	·	1.3 km	MPC · JPL
545180	2011 BM_{76}	—	August 11, 2004	Campo Imperatore	CINEOS	·	1.1 km	MPC · JPL
545181	2011 BU_{79}	—	January 27, 2011	Kitt Peak	Spacewatch	·	1.2 km	MPC · JPL
545182	2011 BV_{79}	—	January 27, 2011	Kitt Peak	Spacewatch	·	1.4 km	MPC · JPL
545183	2011 BA_{83}	—	January 10, 2011	Mount Lemmon	Mount Lemmon Survey	·	1.4 km	MPC · JPL
545184	2011 BO_{87}	—	September 3, 2005	Palomar	NEAT	·	1.5 km	MPC · JPL
545185	2011 BY_{88}	—	January 27, 2011	Mount Lemmon	Mount Lemmon Survey	·	1.3 km	MPC · JPL
545186	2011 BR_{90}	—	January 14, 2011	Kitt Peak	Spacewatch	JUN	780 m	MPC · JPL
545187	2011 BR_{93}	—	April 1, 2003	Kitt Peak	Deep Ecliptic Survey	·	1.8 km	MPC · JPL
545188	2011 BQ_{100}	—	March 6, 2011	Mount Lemmon	Mount Lemmon Survey	·	1.2 km	MPC · JPL
545189	2011 BQ_{122}	—	August 31, 2005	Palomar	NEAT	(5)	1.5 km	MPC · JPL
545190	2011 BP_{125}	—	January 27, 2011	Mount Lemmon	Mount Lemmon Survey	·	1.3 km	MPC · JPL
545191	2011 BL_{131}	—	January 28, 2011	Mount Lemmon	Mount Lemmon Survey	·	1.1 km	MPC · JPL
545192	2011 BY_{132}	—	August 25, 2004	Kitt Peak	Spacewatch	·	1.4 km	MPC · JPL
545193	2011 BL_{136}	—	January 29, 2011	Mount Lemmon	Mount Lemmon Survey	·	870 m	MPC · JPL
545194	2011 BS_{150}	—	January 29, 2011	Mount Lemmon	Mount Lemmon Survey	·	900 m	MPC · JPL
545195	2011 BK_{156}	—	January 28, 2011	Mount Lemmon	Mount Lemmon Survey	MAR	770 m	MPC · JPL
545196	2011 BO_{156}	—	July 27, 1995	Kitt Peak	Spacewatch	·	1.2 km	MPC · JPL
545197	2011 BV_{164}	—	March 12, 2007	Mount Lemmon	Mount Lemmon Survey	·	1.3 km	MPC · JPL
545198	2011 BJ_{171}	—	February 7, 2011	Mount Lemmon	Mount Lemmon Survey	·	1.1 km	MPC · JPL
545199	2011 BT_{172}	—	October 25, 2013	Mount Lemmon	Mount Lemmon Survey	·	1.0 km	MPC · JPL
545200	2011 BW_{173}	—	May 21, 2012	Haleakala	Pan-STARRS 1	·	960 m	MPC · JPL

== 545201–545300 ==
back to top

Designation			Discovery			Properties		Ref
Permanent	Provisional	Named after	Date	Site	Discoverer(s)	Category	Diam.	Ref
545201	2011 BZ_{174}	—	February 7, 2011	Mount Lemmon	Mount Lemmon Survey	·	850 m	MPC · JPL
545202	2011 BK_{175}	—	October 2, 2013	Mount Lemmon	Mount Lemmon Survey	·	1.1 km	MPC · JPL
545203	2011 BY_{177}	—	February 11, 2011	Mount Lemmon	Mount Lemmon Survey	·	1.4 km	MPC · JPL
545204	2011 BU_{181}	—	January 30, 2011	Mount Lemmon	Mount Lemmon Survey	·	1.0 km	MPC · JPL
545205	2011 BF_{183}	—	June 25, 2017	Haleakala	Pan-STARRS 1	·	1.5 km	MPC · JPL
545206	2011 BX_{190}	—	February 10, 2011	Mount Lemmon	Mount Lemmon Survey	·	1.1 km	MPC · JPL
545207	2011 CT_{6}	—	November 16, 2010	Mount Lemmon	Mount Lemmon Survey	·	1.2 km	MPC · JPL
545208	2011 CR_{9}	—	October 18, 2009	Sandlot	G. Hug	·	2.2 km	MPC · JPL
545209	2011 CF_{12}	—	January 27, 2007	Kitt Peak	Spacewatch	·	1.1 km	MPC · JPL
545210	2011 CD_{13}	—	February 5, 2011	Mount Lemmon	Mount Lemmon Survey	·	940 m	MPC · JPL
545211	2011 CL_{18}	—	January 16, 2011	Mount Lemmon	Mount Lemmon Survey	·	1.7 km	MPC · JPL
545212	2011 CU_{19}	—	December 10, 2009	Mount Lemmon	Mount Lemmon Survey	3:2	4.5 km	MPC · JPL
545213	2011 CR_{22}	—	January 30, 2011	Mayhill-ISON	L. Elenin	·	1.4 km	MPC · JPL
545214	2011 CO_{26}	—	February 5, 2011	Catalina	CSS	·	1.7 km	MPC · JPL
545215	2011 CO_{27}	—	December 10, 2010	Mount Lemmon	Mount Lemmon Survey	·	1.5 km	MPC · JPL
545216	2011 CU_{33}	—	July 29, 2000	Cerro Tololo	Deep Ecliptic Survey	BRG	1.2 km	MPC · JPL
545217	2011 CO_{38}	—	August 28, 2009	Kitt Peak	Spacewatch	·	1.0 km	MPC · JPL
545218	2011 CY_{42}	—	February 4, 2011	Catalina	CSS	·	1.6 km	MPC · JPL
545219	2011 CS_{46}	—	January 15, 2011	Mount Lemmon	Mount Lemmon Survey	·	450 m	MPC · JPL
545220	2011 CR_{47}	—	March 9, 2003	Palomar	NEAT	·	2.1 km	MPC · JPL
545221	2011 CM_{59}	—	January 28, 2011	Mount Lemmon	Mount Lemmon Survey	·	980 m	MPC · JPL
545222	2011 CZ_{60}	—	January 28, 2011	Mount Lemmon	Mount Lemmon Survey	·	1.0 km	MPC · JPL
545223	2011 CO_{65}	—	September 19, 2009	Mount Lemmon	Mount Lemmon Survey	EUN	1.2 km	MPC · JPL
545224	2011 CH_{66}	—	February 1, 2003	Palomar	NEAT	·	1.2 km	MPC · JPL
545225	2011 CX_{70}	—	January 27, 2011	Kitt Peak	Spacewatch	·	1.2 km	MPC · JPL
545226	2011 CD_{71}	—	February 9, 2011	Dauban	C. Rinner, Kugel, F.	·	1.5 km	MPC · JPL
545227	2011 CZ_{75}	—	February 10, 2011	Catalina	CSS	·	1.8 km	MPC · JPL
545228	2011 CK_{78}	—	February 8, 2011	Dauban	C. Rinner, Kugel, F.	·	1.5 km	MPC · JPL
545229	2011 CM_{80}	—	October 14, 2009	Mount Lemmon	Mount Lemmon Survey	·	1 km	MPC · JPL
545230	2011 CX_{97}	—	November 5, 2005	Kitt Peak	Spacewatch	·	1.3 km	MPC · JPL
545231	2011 CY_{108}	—	April 16, 2007	Mount Lemmon	Mount Lemmon Survey	·	1.2 km	MPC · JPL
545232	2011 CU_{117}	—	March 26, 2003	Palomar	NEAT	·	1.6 km	MPC · JPL
545233	2011 CN_{122}	—	March 16, 2016	Haleakala	Pan-STARRS 1	·	1.1 km	MPC · JPL
545234	2011 CT_{122}	—	September 24, 1960	Palomar	C. J. van Houten, I. van Houten-Groeneveld, T. Gehrels	·	1.2 km	MPC · JPL
545235	2011 CY_{122}	—	April 27, 2012	Kitt Peak	Spacewatch	·	1.4 km	MPC · JPL
545236	2011 DC	—	February 22, 2011	Kitt Peak	Spacewatch	MAR	850 m	MPC · JPL
545237	2011 DK	—	February 22, 2011	Kitt Peak	Spacewatch	·	1.4 km	MPC · JPL
545238	2011 DX_{3}	—	January 26, 2011	Catalina	CSS	·	1.6 km	MPC · JPL
545239	2011 DQ_{8}	—	January 16, 2011	Mount Lemmon	Mount Lemmon Survey	·	2.3 km	MPC · JPL
545240	2011 DX_{19}	—	February 23, 2011	Catalina	CSS	EUN	1.4 km	MPC · JPL
545241	2011 DO_{26}	—	February 10, 2011	Mount Lemmon	Mount Lemmon Survey	·	1.4 km	MPC · JPL
545242	2011 DJ_{27}	—	January 15, 2011	Mount Lemmon	Mount Lemmon Survey	·	1.1 km	MPC · JPL
545243	2011 DZ_{34}	—	November 6, 2005	Mount Lemmon	Mount Lemmon Survey	·	1.3 km	MPC · JPL
545244	2011 DU_{36}	—	February 25, 2011	Mount Lemmon	Mount Lemmon Survey	·	1.4 km	MPC · JPL
545245	2011 DR_{45}	—	February 26, 2011	Mount Lemmon	Mount Lemmon Survey	·	1.5 km	MPC · JPL
545246	2011 DU_{53}	—	November 10, 2013	Kitt Peak	Spacewatch	·	1.3 km	MPC · JPL
545247	2011 DJ_{54}	—	February 25, 2011	Kitt Peak	Spacewatch	·	1.2 km	MPC · JPL
545248	2011 DB_{55}	—	January 28, 2007	Kitt Peak	Spacewatch	EUN	1.0 km	MPC · JPL
545249	2011 EE_{5}	—	January 30, 2011	Kitt Peak	Spacewatch	·	1.3 km	MPC · JPL
545250	2011 EE_{7}	—	February 9, 2011	Mount Lemmon	Mount Lemmon Survey	HNS	810 m	MPC · JPL
545251	2011 EK_{7}	—	April 9, 2003	Palomar	NEAT	·	1.7 km	MPC · JPL
545252	2011 ED_{8}	—	March 2, 2011	Bergisch Gladbach	W. Bickel	·	1.6 km	MPC · JPL
545253	2011 EX_{15}	—	August 31, 2005	Palomar	NEAT	·	1.4 km	MPC · JPL
545254	2011 EQ_{17}	—	March 6, 2011	Wildberg	R. Apitzsch	·	1.3 km	MPC · JPL
545255	2011 EF_{19}	—	May 5, 2002	Palomar	NEAT	·	1.6 km	MPC · JPL
545256	2011 EC_{24}	—	September 4, 2000	Terskol	Terskol	·	1.3 km	MPC · JPL
545257	2011 EC_{28}	—	March 1, 2011	Mayhill-ISON	L. Elenin	·	1.6 km	MPC · JPL
545258	2011 ET_{30}	—	March 13, 2007	Kitt Peak	Spacewatch	ADE	1.9 km	MPC · JPL
545259	2011 EL_{33}	—	February 22, 2011	Kitt Peak	Spacewatch	·	1.3 km	MPC · JPL
545260	2011 ET_{34}	—	March 9, 2007	Mount Lemmon	Mount Lemmon Survey	·	1.2 km	MPC · JPL
545261	2011 ED_{63}	—	May 13, 2007	Kitt Peak	Spacewatch	·	1.1 km	MPC · JPL
545262	2011 EV_{69}	—	February 25, 2011	Kitt Peak	Spacewatch	EUN	930 m	MPC · JPL
545263	2011 EF_{72}	—	February 22, 2011	Kitt Peak	Spacewatch	·	1.6 km	MPC · JPL
545264	2011 EF_{73}	—	March 2, 2011	Kitt Peak	Spacewatch	·	1.4 km	MPC · JPL
545265	2011 EE_{75}	—	April 4, 2002	Haleakala	NEAT	·	1.9 km	MPC · JPL
545266	2011 ES_{81}	—	April 18, 2007	Catalina	CSS	ADE	2.2 km	MPC · JPL
545267	2011 EA_{89}	—	October 20, 2008	Mount Lemmon	Mount Lemmon Survey	DOR	2.3 km	MPC · JPL
545268	2011 EP_{89}	—	March 5, 2011	Mount Lemmon	Mount Lemmon Survey	·	1.3 km	MPC · JPL
545269	2011 EZ_{89}	—	March 10, 2011	Kitt Peak	Spacewatch	·	1.5 km	MPC · JPL
545270	2011 EA_{92}	—	January 22, 2015	Haleakala	Pan-STARRS 1	EUN	1.0 km	MPC · JPL
545271	2011 ED_{92}	—	November 27, 2013	Haleakala	Pan-STARRS 1	·	1.6 km	MPC · JPL
545272	2011 EO_{92}	—	March 2, 2011	Kitt Peak	Spacewatch	·	1.6 km	MPC · JPL
545273	2011 EF_{93}	—	March 13, 2011	Kitt Peak	Spacewatch	·	1.6 km	MPC · JPL
545274	2011 FZ_{2}	—	March 25, 2011	Mount Lemmon	Mount Lemmon Survey	T_{j} (2.82) · APO +1km	1.1 km	MPC · JPL
545275	2011 FU_{4}	—	March 24, 2011	Kitt Peak	Spacewatch	·	1.9 km	MPC · JPL
545276	2011 FN_{7}	—	March 31, 2007	Palomar	NEAT	·	1.4 km	MPC · JPL
545277	2011 FH_{10}	—	January 19, 2002	Kitt Peak	Spacewatch	MIS	2.2 km	MPC · JPL
545278	2011 FM_{12}	—	March 13, 2011	Kitt Peak	Spacewatch	(1547)	1.2 km	MPC · JPL
545279	2011 FF_{14}	—	December 19, 2009	Mount Lemmon	Mount Lemmon Survey	·	1.9 km	MPC · JPL
545280	2011 FH_{15}	—	March 28, 2011	Mount Lemmon	Mount Lemmon Survey	·	1.4 km	MPC · JPL
545281	2011 FF_{20}	—	March 1, 2011	Mount Lemmon	Mount Lemmon Survey	·	1.4 km	MPC · JPL
545282	2011 FC_{24}	—	November 9, 2009	Mount Lemmon	Mount Lemmon Survey	·	1.6 km	MPC · JPL
545283	2011 FJ_{26}	—	March 30, 2011	Piszkés-tető	K. Sárneczky, Z. Kuli	·	1.8 km	MPC · JPL
545284	2011 FA_{31}	—	March 27, 2011	Mount Lemmon	Mount Lemmon Survey	·	1.4 km	MPC · JPL
545285	2011 FZ_{33}	—	October 17, 2008	Kitt Peak	Spacewatch	·	2.0 km	MPC · JPL
545286	2011 FO_{43}	—	March 28, 2011	Catalina	CSS	·	1.5 km	MPC · JPL
545287	2011 FK_{46}	—	April 13, 2002	Kitt Peak	Spacewatch	·	1.3 km	MPC · JPL
545288	2011 FK_{48}	—	March 29, 2011	Kitt Peak	Spacewatch	·	1.9 km	MPC · JPL
545289	2011 FK_{50}	—	September 28, 2008	Mount Bigelow	CSS	·	1.5 km	MPC · JPL
545290	2011 FC_{54}	—	September 6, 2008	Kitt Peak	Spacewatch	·	1.4 km	MPC · JPL
545291	2011 FP_{58}	—	March 30, 2011	Mount Lemmon	Mount Lemmon Survey	(194)	2.0 km	MPC · JPL
545292	2011 FU_{58}	—	March 30, 2011	Mount Lemmon	Mount Lemmon Survey	AEO	920 m	MPC · JPL
545293	2011 FX_{62}	—	February 4, 2005	Palomar Mountain	M. E. Brown, C. A. Trujillo, D. L. Rabinowitz	centaur	202 km	MPC · JPL
545294	2011 FP_{63}	—	April 6, 2002	Cerro Tololo	Deep Ecliptic Survey	JUN	730 m	MPC · JPL
545295	2011 FN_{67}	—	February 16, 2002	Palomar	NEAT	·	1.6 km	MPC · JPL
545296	2011 FW_{69}	—	March 2, 2011	Mount Lemmon	Mount Lemmon Survey	HNS	1.2 km	MPC · JPL
545297	2011 FC_{70}	—	September 26, 2009	Kitt Peak	Spacewatch	BAR	1.1 km	MPC · JPL
545298	2011 FM_{71}	—	March 29, 2011	Catalina	CSS	·	2.3 km	MPC · JPL
545299	2011 FX_{74}	—	September 27, 2000	Kitt Peak	Spacewatch	·	1.3 km	MPC · JPL
545300	2011 FG_{80}	—	March 27, 2011	Mount Lemmon	Mount Lemmon Survey	·	1.3 km	MPC · JPL

== 545301–545400 ==
back to top

Designation			Discovery			Properties		Ref
Permanent	Provisional	Named after	Date	Site	Discoverer(s)	Category	Diam.	Ref
545301	2011 FM_{81}	—	March 28, 2011	Mount Lemmon	Mount Lemmon Survey	·	1.6 km	MPC · JPL
545302	2011 FX_{82}	—	March 10, 2011	Kitt Peak	Spacewatch	·	1.2 km	MPC · JPL
545303	2011 FP_{83}	—	March 30, 2011	Mount Lemmon	Mount Lemmon Survey	·	2.1 km	MPC · JPL
545304	2011 FC_{85}	—	February 25, 2011	Kitt Peak	Spacewatch	HNS	990 m	MPC · JPL
545305	2011 FG_{91}	—	March 28, 2011	Mount Lemmon	Mount Lemmon Survey	·	1.1 km	MPC · JPL
545306	2011 FN_{94}	—	November 20, 2009	Kitt Peak	Spacewatch	·	1.3 km	MPC · JPL
545307	2011 FR_{103}	—	February 25, 2011	Mount Lemmon	Mount Lemmon Survey	EUN	1 km	MPC · JPL
545308	2011 FD_{105}	—	July 17, 2004	Cerro Tololo	Deep Ecliptic Survey	·	1.5 km	MPC · JPL
545309	2011 FC_{107}	—	April 5, 2011	Mount Lemmon	Mount Lemmon Survey	·	1.0 km	MPC · JPL
545310	2011 FJ_{110}	—	April 1, 2011	Mount Lemmon	Mount Lemmon Survey	HNS	1.1 km	MPC · JPL
545311	2011 FJ_{114}	—	April 1, 2011	Mount Lemmon	Mount Lemmon Survey	·	1.4 km	MPC · JPL
545312	2011 FT_{117}	—	September 3, 2008	Kitt Peak	Spacewatch	·	1.4 km	MPC · JPL
545313	2011 FX_{120}	—	September 25, 2008	Mount Lemmon	Mount Lemmon Survey	·	1.8 km	MPC · JPL
545314	2011 FZ_{120}	—	May 10, 2007	Kitt Peak	Spacewatch	·	1.2 km	MPC · JPL
545315	2011 FN_{126}	—	February 24, 2006	Anderson Mesa	LONEOS	·	1.9 km	MPC · JPL
545316	2011 FD_{127}	—	December 26, 2005	Mount Lemmon	Mount Lemmon Survey	·	1.5 km	MPC · JPL
545317	2011 FA_{128}	—	November 17, 2009	Mount Lemmon	Mount Lemmon Survey	·	1.4 km	MPC · JPL
545318	2011 FW_{136}	—	February 8, 2011	Mount Lemmon	Mount Lemmon Survey	·	1.2 km	MPC · JPL
545319	2011 FM_{142}	—	March 28, 2011	Kitt Peak	Spacewatch	·	1.6 km	MPC · JPL
545320	2011 FN_{143}	—	March 6, 2011	Kitt Peak	Spacewatch	·	1.3 km	MPC · JPL
545321	2011 FE_{146}	—	April 2, 2011	Haleakala	Pan-STARRS 1	·	2.2 km	MPC · JPL
545322	2011 FY_{146}	—	November 27, 2009	Mount Lemmon	Mount Lemmon Survey	·	2.4 km	MPC · JPL
545323	2011 FM_{147}	—	February 25, 2007	Mount Lemmon	Mount Lemmon Survey	·	2.4 km	MPC · JPL
545324	2011 FO_{147}	—	April 1, 2011	Catalina	CSS	JUN	1.2 km	MPC · JPL
545325	2011 FT_{150}	—	October 18, 2009	Mount Lemmon	Mount Lemmon Survey	·	1.7 km	MPC · JPL
545326	2011 FD_{155}	—	March 27, 2011	Mount Lemmon	Mount Lemmon Survey	·	1.4 km	MPC · JPL
545327	2011 FO_{156}	—	March 30, 2011	Mount Lemmon	Mount Lemmon Survey	·	1.1 km	MPC · JPL
545328	2011 FA_{159}	—	March 26, 2011	Mount Lemmon	Mount Lemmon Survey	·	1.4 km	MPC · JPL
545329	2011 FM_{160}	—	November 27, 2013	Haleakala	Pan-STARRS 1	·	1.2 km	MPC · JPL
545330	2011 FC_{161}	—	October 5, 2013	Haleakala	Pan-STARRS 1	·	1.3 km	MPC · JPL
545331	2011 FR_{161}	—	March 26, 2011	Mount Lemmon	Mount Lemmon Survey	·	1.5 km	MPC · JPL
545332	2011 FD_{162}	—	March 26, 2011	Mount Lemmon	Mount Lemmon Survey	·	1.4 km	MPC · JPL
545333	2011 FZ_{163}	—	March 27, 2011	Mount Lemmon	Mount Lemmon Survey	·	1.8 km	MPC · JPL
545334	2011 FE_{164}	—	April 5, 2011	Mount Lemmon	Mount Lemmon Survey	·	1.2 km	MPC · JPL
545335	2011 FR_{164}	—	October 28, 2013	Mount Lemmon	Mount Lemmon Survey	·	1.4 km	MPC · JPL
545336	2011 GP_{3}	—	April 9, 2002	Kitt Peak	Spacewatch	·	1.7 km	MPC · JPL
545337	2011 GH_{5}	—	April 2, 2011	Mount Lemmon	Mount Lemmon Survey	·	1.2 km	MPC · JPL
545338	2011 GX_{6}	—	April 2, 2011	Mount Lemmon	Mount Lemmon Survey	·	1.5 km	MPC · JPL
545339	2011 GO_{7}	—	February 4, 2006	Kitt Peak	Spacewatch	·	1.4 km	MPC · JPL
545340	2011 GA_{9}	—	August 3, 2008	Siding Spring	SSS	·	2.0 km	MPC · JPL
545341	2011 GE_{9}	—	April 2, 2011	Mount Lemmon	Mount Lemmon Survey	·	1.6 km	MPC · JPL
545342	2011 GL_{11}	—	March 14, 2007	Kitt Peak	Spacewatch	·	1.5 km	MPC · JPL
545343	2011 GV_{18}	—	November 25, 2009	Kitt Peak	Spacewatch	·	1.4 km	MPC · JPL
545344	2011 GM_{19}	—	October 30, 2008	Mount Lemmon	Mount Lemmon Survey	·	1.8 km	MPC · JPL
545345	2011 GG_{24}	—	April 19, 2007	Mount Lemmon	Mount Lemmon Survey	·	2.2 km	MPC · JPL
545346	2011 GM_{24}	—	September 21, 2009	Mount Lemmon	Mount Lemmon Survey	·	1.4 km	MPC · JPL
545347	2011 GZ_{25}	—	April 4, 2011	Mount Lemmon	Mount Lemmon Survey	NEM	2.1 km	MPC · JPL
545348	2011 GN_{26}	—	April 4, 2011	Mount Lemmon	Mount Lemmon Survey	·	1.4 km	MPC · JPL
545349	2011 GU_{27}	—	April 2, 2011	Bergisch Gladbach	W. Bickel	(1547)	1.3 km	MPC · JPL
545350	2011 GA_{38}	—	April 4, 2011	Mount Lemmon	Mount Lemmon Survey	·	1.4 km	MPC · JPL
545351	2011 GR_{40}	—	March 5, 2002	Kitt Peak	Spacewatch	JUN	650 m	MPC · JPL
545352	2011 GF_{41}	—	December 16, 2009	Mount Lemmon	Mount Lemmon Survey	·	1.9 km	MPC · JPL
545353	2011 GS_{41}	—	April 28, 2007	Kitt Peak	Spacewatch	·	1.7 km	MPC · JPL
545354	2011 GX_{41}	—	April 5, 2011	Catalina	CSS	·	1.8 km	MPC · JPL
545355	2011 GR_{43}	—	April 4, 2011	Mount Lemmon	Mount Lemmon Survey	·	1.3 km	MPC · JPL
545356	2011 GW_{46}	—	March 29, 2011	Kitt Peak	Spacewatch	·	1.5 km	MPC · JPL
545357	2011 GE_{57}	—	December 2, 2005	Kitt Peak	Wasserman, L. H., Millis, R. L.	·	1.9 km	MPC · JPL
545358	2011 GD_{59}	—	March 4, 2011	Mount Lemmon	Mount Lemmon Survey	·	1.7 km	MPC · JPL
545359	2011 GY_{59}	—	November 1, 2008	Mount Lemmon	Mount Lemmon Survey	·	2.1 km	MPC · JPL
545360	2011 GP_{60}	—	April 9, 2011	Dauban	C. Rinner, Kugel, F.	·	2.2 km	MPC · JPL
545361	2011 GZ_{61}	—	April 9, 2011	La Silla	La Silla	cubewano (hot)	329 km	MPC · JPL
545362	2011 GP_{63}	—	March 12, 2002	Palomar	NEAT	·	1.9 km	MPC · JPL
545363	2011 GT_{63}	—	April 5, 2011	Catalina	CSS	JUN	980 m	MPC · JPL
545364	2011 GX_{66}	—	December 10, 2009	Mount Lemmon	Mount Lemmon Survey	ADE	2.5 km	MPC · JPL
545365	2011 GZ_{72}	—	January 31, 2006	Mount Lemmon	Mount Lemmon Survey	·	1.1 km	MPC · JPL
545366	2011 GM_{75}	—	January 4, 2006	Kitt Peak	Spacewatch	·	1.4 km	MPC · JPL
545367	2011 GX_{76}	—	April 5, 2011	Mayhill-ISON	L. Elenin	·	1.2 km	MPC · JPL
545368	2011 GE_{80}	—	October 6, 2008	Mount Lemmon	Mount Lemmon Survey	·	2.4 km	MPC · JPL
545369	2011 GZ_{80}	—	December 28, 2005	Kitt Peak	Spacewatch	·	1.6 km	MPC · JPL
545370	2011 GL_{81}	—	April 13, 2011	Kitt Peak	Spacewatch	WAT	1.5 km	MPC · JPL
545371	2011 GR_{81}	—	October 29, 2008	Mount Lemmon	Mount Lemmon Survey	·	2.7 km	MPC · JPL
545372	2011 GX_{81}	—	April 13, 2011	Haleakala	Pan-STARRS 1	·	2.0 km	MPC · JPL
545373	2011 GY_{82}	—	March 27, 2011	Mount Lemmon	Mount Lemmon Survey	·	1.2 km	MPC · JPL
545374	2011 GC_{90}	—	April 3, 2011	Haleakala	Pan-STARRS 1	·	1.5 km	MPC · JPL
545375	2011 GP_{91}	—	December 7, 2013	Haleakala	Pan-STARRS 1	·	2.1 km	MPC · JPL
545376	2011 GV_{95}	—	April 12, 2011	Mount Lemmon	Mount Lemmon Survey	·	1.4 km	MPC · JPL
545377	2011 GB_{97}	—	November 25, 2013	Haleakala	Pan-STARRS 1	HNS	1.1 km	MPC · JPL
545378	2011 GH_{97}	—	January 14, 2015	Haleakala	Pan-STARRS 1	HNS	1.0 km	MPC · JPL
545379	2011 GK_{99}	—	October 13, 2013	Kitt Peak	Spacewatch	·	1.2 km	MPC · JPL
545380	2011 HS_{13}	—	April 23, 2011	Haleakala	Pan-STARRS 1	·	2.0 km	MPC · JPL
545381	2011 HD_{16}	—	August 20, 2003	Haleakala	NEAT	·	1.5 km	MPC · JPL
545382	2011 HV_{18}	—	April 26, 2011	Kitt Peak	Spacewatch	·	2.3 km	MPC · JPL
545383	2011 HY_{18}	—	April 22, 2002	Palomar	NEAT	·	2.4 km	MPC · JPL
545384	2011 HX_{22}	—	April 27, 2011	Haleakala	Pan-STARRS 1	·	1.7 km	MPC · JPL
545385	2011 HM_{25}	—	April 5, 2011	Kitt Peak	Spacewatch	·	1.5 km	MPC · JPL
545386	2011 HB_{27}	—	October 6, 2008	Mount Lemmon	Mount Lemmon Survey	·	1.8 km	MPC · JPL
545387	2011 HG_{27}	—	April 22, 2011	Kitt Peak	Spacewatch	·	1.0 km	MPC · JPL
545388	2011 HA_{28}	—	March 25, 2011	Kitt Peak	Spacewatch	·	1.6 km	MPC · JPL
545389	2011 HB_{31}	—	August 29, 2005	Kitt Peak	Spacewatch	T_{j} (2.98) · 3:2	5.3 km	MPC · JPL
545390	2011 HD_{31}	—	April 13, 2011	Kitt Peak	Spacewatch	·	1.9 km	MPC · JPL
545391	2011 HS_{32}	—	April 27, 2011	Kitt Peak	Spacewatch	·	1.9 km	MPC · JPL
545392	2011 HY_{41}	—	March 15, 2011	Mount Lemmon	Mount Lemmon Survey	EUN	1.7 km	MPC · JPL
545393	2011 HL_{44}	—	April 27, 2011	Kitt Peak	Spacewatch	·	1.9 km	MPC · JPL
545394 Rossetter	2011 HH_{45}	Rossetter	November 2, 2008	Vail-Jarnac	T. Glinos, D. H. Levy	·	2.2 km	MPC · JPL
545395	2011 HQ_{45}	—	April 28, 2011	Kitt Peak	Spacewatch	·	2.1 km	MPC · JPL
545396	2011 HV_{45}	—	April 13, 2011	Mount Lemmon	Mount Lemmon Survey	·	1.4 km	MPC · JPL
545397	2011 HW_{47}	—	December 15, 2009	Mount Lemmon	Mount Lemmon Survey	·	2.1 km	MPC · JPL
545398	2011 HZ_{47}	—	December 19, 2009	Mount Lemmon	Mount Lemmon Survey	·	2.1 km	MPC · JPL
545399	2011 HU_{56}	—	March 20, 2002	Palomar	NEAT	·	1.3 km	MPC · JPL
545400	2011 HZ_{56}	—	April 28, 2011	Kitt Peak	Spacewatch	TIN	910 m	MPC · JPL

== 545401–545500 ==
back to top

Designation			Discovery			Properties		Ref
Permanent	Provisional	Named after	Date	Site	Discoverer(s)	Category	Diam.	Ref
545401	2011 HQ_{60}	—	April 30, 2011	Calvin-Rehoboth	L. A. Molnar	·	2.7 km	MPC · JPL
545402	2011 HT_{62}	—	October 31, 2005	Mauna Kea	A. Boattini	·	2.8 km	MPC · JPL
545403	2011 HT_{64}	—	April 21, 2011	Haleakala	Pan-STARRS 1	·	2.3 km	MPC · JPL
545404	2011 HT_{66}	—	November 25, 2009	Mount Lemmon	Mount Lemmon Survey	·	2.0 km	MPC · JPL
545405	2011 HD_{69}	—	October 15, 2004	Mount Lemmon	Mount Lemmon Survey	·	1.6 km	MPC · JPL
545406	2011 HK_{69}	—	October 23, 2006	Kitt Peak	Spacewatch	3:2 · SHU	5.8 km	MPC · JPL
545407	2011 HZ_{69}	—	October 8, 2008	Kitt Peak	Spacewatch	AGN	1.1 km	MPC · JPL
545408	2011 HW_{70}	—	March 28, 2011	Kitt Peak	Spacewatch	·	1.8 km	MPC · JPL
545409	2011 HN_{71}	—	January 25, 2006	Kitt Peak	Spacewatch	·	1.3 km	MPC · JPL
545410	2011 HE_{73}	—	April 7, 2011	Kitt Peak	Spacewatch	·	1.6 km	MPC · JPL
545411	2011 HT_{73}	—	October 23, 2004	Kitt Peak	Spacewatch	·	1.8 km	MPC · JPL
545412	2011 HQ_{76}	—	April 12, 2002	Palomar	NEAT	·	1.8 km	MPC · JPL
545413	2011 HH_{77}	—	October 26, 2003	Anderson Mesa	LONEOS	·	3.3 km	MPC · JPL
545414	2011 HU_{85}	—	May 10, 2007	Mount Lemmon	Mount Lemmon Survey	·	1.1 km	MPC · JPL
545415	2011 HO_{86}	—	March 27, 2011	Mount Lemmon	Mount Lemmon Survey	3:2	5.5 km	MPC · JPL
545416	2011 HQ_{92}	—	February 6, 2006	Mount Lemmon	Mount Lemmon Survey	(12739)	1.7 km	MPC · JPL
545417	2011 HY_{96}	—	April 28, 2011	Kitt Peak	Spacewatch	GEF	1.3 km	MPC · JPL
545418	2011 HM_{97}	—	February 1, 2006	Mount Lemmon	Mount Lemmon Survey	·	1.7 km	MPC · JPL
545419	2011 HU_{97}	—	April 4, 2011	Kitt Peak	Spacewatch	·	1.8 km	MPC · JPL
545420	2011 HQ_{99}	—	August 12, 2007	XuYi	PMO NEO Survey Program	·	1.7 km	MPC · JPL
545421	2011 HV_{100}	—	April 28, 2011	Haleakala	Pan-STARRS 1	TIN	1.2 km	MPC · JPL
545422	2011 HA_{101}	—	April 30, 2011	Mount Lemmon	Mount Lemmon Survey	·	1.2 km	MPC · JPL
545423	2011 HV_{101}	—	March 28, 2011	Kitt Peak	Spacewatch	·	1.3 km	MPC · JPL
545424	2011 HJ_{104}	—	April 30, 2011	Haleakala	Pan-STARRS 1	·	1.9 km	MPC · JPL
545425	2011 HU_{104}	—	April 27, 2011	Mount Lemmon	Mount Lemmon Survey	HNS	1.1 km	MPC · JPL
545426	2011 HC_{105}	—	November 27, 2013	Haleakala	Pan-STARRS 1	·	1.7 km	MPC · JPL
545427	2011 HN_{105}	—	March 18, 2015	Haleakala	Pan-STARRS 1	HNS	780 m	MPC · JPL
545428	2011 HP_{108}	—	March 13, 2015	Mount Lemmon	Mount Lemmon Survey	·	1.3 km	MPC · JPL
545429	2011 HV_{108}	—	February 18, 2015	Haleakala	Pan-STARRS 1	·	1.2 km	MPC · JPL
545430	2011 JT	—	May 2, 2011	Catalina	CSS	·	1.5 km	MPC · JPL
545431	2011 JH_{3}	—	April 30, 2011	Mount Lemmon	Mount Lemmon Survey	·	1.4 km	MPC · JPL
545432	2011 JB_{7}	—	November 10, 2004	Kitt Peak	Spacewatch	NEM	2.1 km	MPC · JPL
545433	2011 JM_{8}	—	May 6, 2011	Mount Lemmon	Mount Lemmon Survey	·	1.9 km	MPC · JPL
545434	2011 JB_{9}	—	April 28, 2011	Kitt Peak	Spacewatch	·	1.6 km	MPC · JPL
545435	2011 JO_{14}	—	May 13, 2002	Palomar	NEAT	·	2.3 km	MPC · JPL
545436	2011 JK_{16}	—	May 17, 2002	Kitt Peak	Spacewatch	·	1.4 km	MPC · JPL
545437	2011 JY_{17}	—	April 24, 2011	Catalina	CSS	·	2.5 km	MPC · JPL
545438	2011 JQ_{19}	—	December 3, 2005	Mauna Kea	A. Boattini	·	2.0 km	MPC · JPL
545439	2011 JU_{20}	—	August 25, 2003	Cerro Tololo	Deep Ecliptic Survey	·	2.2 km	MPC · JPL
545440	2011 JR_{21}	—	May 1, 2011	Mount Lemmon	Mount Lemmon Survey	·	1.5 km	MPC · JPL
545441	2011 JN_{25}	—	October 2, 2008	Mount Lemmon	Mount Lemmon Survey	·	1.5 km	MPC · JPL
545442	2011 JP_{26}	—	November 3, 2008	Mount Lemmon	Mount Lemmon Survey	·	2.1 km	MPC · JPL
545443	2011 JF_{28}	—	March 14, 2011	Mount Lemmon	Mount Lemmon Survey	·	1.7 km	MPC · JPL
545444	2011 JS_{29}	—	May 4, 2011	Modra	Gajdoš, S., Világi, J.	H	610 m	MPC · JPL
545445	2011 JM_{32}	—	May 1, 2011	Mount Lemmon	Mount Lemmon Survey	·	1.6 km	MPC · JPL
545446	2011 JF_{33}	—	April 16, 2015	Mount Lemmon	Mount Lemmon Survey	·	1.2 km	MPC · JPL
545447	2011 JK_{33}	—	May 1, 2011	Haleakala	Pan-STARRS 1	·	2.2 km	MPC · JPL
545448	2011 JT_{33}	—	May 12, 2011	Kitt Peak	Spacewatch	·	1.8 km	MPC · JPL
545449	2011 KA_{5}	—	April 27, 2011	Mount Lemmon	Mount Lemmon Survey	·	2.4 km	MPC · JPL
545450	2011 KG_{5}	—	May 3, 2011	Mount Lemmon	Mount Lemmon Survey	NEM	2.2 km	MPC · JPL
545451	2011 KY_{8}	—	April 21, 2002	Palomar	NEAT	JUN	1.4 km	MPC · JPL
545452	2011 KV_{9}	—	August 10, 2007	Kitt Peak	Spacewatch	·	1.6 km	MPC · JPL
545453	2011 KJ_{12}	—	September 22, 2008	Kitt Peak	Spacewatch	(5)	1.2 km	MPC · JPL
545454	2011 KB_{13}	—	May 24, 2011	Nogales	M. Schwartz, P. R. Holvorcem	GEF	1.7 km	MPC · JPL
545455	2011 KQ_{15}	—	May 27, 2011	Nogales	M. Schwartz, P. R. Holvorcem	TIN	1.0 km	MPC · JPL
545456	2011 KS_{23}	—	June 5, 2002	Kitt Peak	Spacewatch	·	1.5 km	MPC · JPL
545457	2011 KG_{24}	—	April 15, 2008	Mount Lemmon	Mount Lemmon Survey	L5	8.0 km	MPC · JPL
545458	2011 KA_{25}	—	May 5, 2011	Mount Lemmon	Mount Lemmon Survey	·	2.2 km	MPC · JPL
545459	2011 KY_{25}	—	May 23, 2011	Bergisch Gladbach	W. Bickel	·	1.6 km	MPC · JPL
545460	2011 KB_{27}	—	July 25, 2003	Palomar	NEAT	·	1.3 km	MPC · JPL
545461	2011 KT_{31}	—	October 1, 2003	Kitt Peak	Spacewatch	·	2.5 km	MPC · JPL
545462	2011 KT_{34}	—	May 23, 2011	Mount Lemmon	Mount Lemmon Survey	·	1.9 km	MPC · JPL
545463	2011 KC_{40}	—	March 23, 2006	Mount Lemmon	Mount Lemmon Survey	MRX	960 m	MPC · JPL
545464	2011 KD_{40}	—	May 24, 2011	Haleakala	Pan-STARRS 1	·	2.1 km	MPC · JPL
545465	2011 KE_{42}	—	May 2, 2006	Mount Lemmon	Mount Lemmon Survey	·	1.9 km	MPC · JPL
545466	2011 KO_{46}	—	September 14, 2007	Kitt Peak	Spacewatch	·	1.6 km	MPC · JPL
545467	2011 KD_{50}	—	May 31, 2011	Mount Lemmon	Mount Lemmon Survey	·	1.9 km	MPC · JPL
545468	2011 KM_{50}	—	January 28, 2015	Haleakala	Pan-STARRS 1	·	1.4 km	MPC · JPL
545469	2011 KA_{51}	—	September 17, 2012	Mount Lemmon	Mount Lemmon Survey	TIN	770 m	MPC · JPL
545470	2011 KW_{52}	—	August 31, 2017	Haleakala	Pan-STARRS 1	HOF	1.9 km	MPC · JPL
545471	2011 KB_{53}	—	December 29, 2014	Haleakala	Pan-STARRS 1	EUN	1.1 km	MPC · JPL
545472	2011 KJ_{53}	—	October 28, 2013	Kitt Peak	Spacewatch	EUN	990 m	MPC · JPL
545473	2011 LF_{2}	—	May 21, 2011	Mount Lemmon	Mount Lemmon Survey	·	1.5 km	MPC · JPL
545474	2011 LK_{6}	—	June 4, 2011	Mount Lemmon	Mount Lemmon Survey	·	2.0 km	MPC · JPL
545475	2011 LO_{9}	—	June 5, 2011	Mount Lemmon	Mount Lemmon Survey	HOF	2.2 km	MPC · JPL
545476	2011 LW_{13}	—	June 3, 2011	Nogales	M. Schwartz, P. R. Holvorcem	·	2.1 km	MPC · JPL
545477	2011 LB_{15}	—	May 23, 2011	Mount Lemmon	Mount Lemmon Survey	MRX	860 m	MPC · JPL
545478	2011 LS_{18}	—	February 10, 2010	Kitt Peak	Spacewatch	·	1.9 km	MPC · JPL
545479	2011 LS_{20}	—	June 13, 2011	Mount Lemmon	Mount Lemmon Survey	L5	9.8 km	MPC · JPL
545480	2011 LM_{21}	—	June 6, 2011	Haleakala	Pan-STARRS 1	ADE	1.5 km	MPC · JPL
545481	2011 LR_{21}	—	June 2, 2011	Haleakala	Pan-STARRS 1	·	2.1 km	MPC · JPL
545482	2011 LD_{24}	—	October 23, 2008	Kitt Peak	Spacewatch	·	1.9 km	MPC · JPL
545483	2011 LL_{25}	—	June 7, 2011	Haleakala	Pan-STARRS 1	·	2.3 km	MPC · JPL
545484	2011 LH_{26}	—	May 13, 2011	Mount Lemmon	Mount Lemmon Survey	·	1.6 km	MPC · JPL
545485	2011 LK_{26}	—	June 8, 2011	Mount Lemmon	Mount Lemmon Survey	·	640 m	MPC · JPL
545486	2011 LV_{28}	—	January 28, 2015	Haleakala	Pan-STARRS 1	·	1.5 km	MPC · JPL
545487	2011 MN_{1}	—	June 24, 2011	Haleakala	Haleakala	·	2.1 km	MPC · JPL
545488	2011 MG_{5}	—	December 21, 2008	Kitt Peak	Spacewatch	BRA	1.3 km	MPC · JPL
545489	2011 MB_{8}	—	June 24, 2011	Mount Lemmon	Mount Lemmon Survey	L5	9.8 km	MPC · JPL
545490	2011 MA_{10}	—	February 22, 2001	Kitt Peak	Spacewatch	·	1.3 km	MPC · JPL
545491	2011 ME_{11}	—	August 25, 2003	Palomar	NEAT	JUN	1.3 km	MPC · JPL
545492	2011 MB_{12}	—	October 8, 2002	Palomar	NEAT	·	2.0 km	MPC · JPL
545493	2011 MJ_{12}	—	June 26, 2011	Mount Lemmon	Mount Lemmon Survey	·	810 m	MPC · JPL
545494	2011 NR_{3}	—	June 26, 2011	Mount Lemmon	Mount Lemmon Survey	L5	10 km	MPC · JPL
545495	2011 NQ_{4}	—	July 1, 2011	Kitt Peak	Spacewatch	·	1.7 km	MPC · JPL
545496	2011 OH_{2}	—	July 22, 2011	Haleakala	Pan-STARRS 1	·	2.0 km	MPC · JPL
545497	2011 OB_{8}	—	December 26, 2009	Kitt Peak	Spacewatch	·	650 m	MPC · JPL
545498	2011 OW_{8}	—	July 27, 2011	Haleakala	Pan-STARRS 1	EOS	1.5 km	MPC · JPL
545499	2011 OZ_{11}	—	March 1, 2005	Kitt Peak	Spacewatch	·	1.6 km	MPC · JPL
545500	2011 OU_{17}	—	July 30, 2011	Sierra Stars	Matson, R. D.	·	1.8 km	MPC · JPL

== 545501–545600 ==
back to top

Designation			Discovery			Properties		Ref
Permanent	Provisional	Named after	Date	Site	Discoverer(s)	Category	Diam.	Ref
545501	2011 OO_{18}	—	June 12, 2009	Kitt Peak	Spacewatch	L5	10 km	MPC · JPL
545502	2011 OW_{21}	—	July 25, 2011	Haleakala	Pan-STARRS 1	WIT	810 m	MPC · JPL
545503	2011 OL_{26}	—	January 28, 2007	Mount Lemmon	Mount Lemmon Survey	L5	8.4 km	MPC · JPL
545504	2011 OZ_{26}	—	July 28, 2011	Haleakala	Pan-STARRS 1	·	870 m	MPC · JPL
545505	2011 OC_{28}	—	July 26, 2011	Haleakala	Pan-STARRS 1	L5	8.5 km	MPC · JPL
545506	2011 OA_{33}	—	June 22, 2011	Mount Lemmon	Mount Lemmon Survey	·	680 m	MPC · JPL
545507	2011 OR_{39}	—	July 31, 2011	Haleakala	Pan-STARRS 1	L5	8.8 km	MPC · JPL
545508	2011 OH_{41}	—	July 27, 2011	Haleakala	Pan-STARRS 1	L5	9.3 km	MPC · JPL
545509	2011 OW_{43}	—	April 11, 2010	Kitt Peak	Spacewatch	KOR	1.2 km	MPC · JPL
545510	2011 OR_{47}	—	July 28, 2011	Haleakala	Pan-STARRS 1	NEM	1.9 km	MPC · JPL
545511	2011 OU_{47}	—	July 28, 2011	Haleakala	Pan-STARRS 1	·	530 m	MPC · JPL
545512	2011 OK_{49}	—	July 29, 2011	Siding Spring	SSS	·	2.1 km	MPC · JPL
545513	2011 OL_{50}	—	August 19, 2001	Cerro Tololo	Deep Ecliptic Survey	KOR	1.5 km	MPC · JPL
545514	2011 OP_{54}	—	July 26, 2011	Haleakala	Pan-STARRS 1	·	3.1 km	MPC · JPL
545515	2011 OQ_{54}	—	October 15, 2007	Catalina	CSS	·	2.0 km	MPC · JPL
545516	2011 OR_{58}	—	August 31, 2011	Haleakala	Pan-STARRS 1	·	1.6 km	MPC · JPL
545517	2011 ON_{60}	—	July 24, 2011	Haleakala	Haleakala	L5	6.3 km	MPC · JPL
545518	2011 OZ_{60}	—	July 27, 2011	Haleakala	Pan-STARRS 1	·	610 m	MPC · JPL
545519	2011 OK_{61}	—	May 21, 2015	Haleakala	Pan-STARRS 1	EOS	1.6 km	MPC · JPL
545520	2011 OA_{62}	—	December 15, 2014	Mount Lemmon	Mount Lemmon Survey	L5	8.3 km	MPC · JPL
545521	2011 OJ_{62}	—	July 28, 2011	Haleakala	Pan-STARRS 1	·	600 m	MPC · JPL
545522	2011 ON_{63}	—	July 28, 2011	Haleakala	Pan-STARRS 1	L5	6.7 km	MPC · JPL
545523	2011 OW_{64}	—	January 24, 2014	Haleakala	Pan-STARRS 1	TIR	2.1 km	MPC · JPL
545524	2011 OP_{65}	—	December 27, 2013	Kitt Peak	Spacewatch	·	1.8 km	MPC · JPL
545525	2011 OT_{65}	—	June 12, 2015	Haleakala	Pan-STARRS 1	·	1.5 km	MPC · JPL
545526	2011 OP_{66}	—	July 25, 2011	Haleakala	Pan-STARRS 1	L5	9.4 km	MPC · JPL
545527	2011 OB_{68}	—	July 27, 2011	Haleakala	Pan-STARRS 1	L5	6.2 km	MPC · JPL
545528	2011 OG_{69}	—	July 27, 2011	Haleakala	Pan-STARRS 1	L5	7.7 km	MPC · JPL
545529	2011 OP_{69}	—	July 27, 2011	Haleakala	Pan-STARRS 1	L5 · (291316)	6.7 km	MPC · JPL
545530	2011 PX_{2}	—	June 4, 2005	Kitt Peak	Spacewatch	·	2.2 km	MPC · JPL
545531	2011 PF_{6}	—	August 4, 2011	Haleakala	Pan-STARRS 1	·	1.6 km	MPC · JPL
545532	2011 PL_{9}	—	May 23, 2001	Cerro Tololo	Deep Ecliptic Survey	·	1.9 km	MPC · JPL
545533	2011 PQ_{10}	—	March 31, 2008	Mount Lemmon	Mount Lemmon Survey	L5	8.4 km	MPC · JPL
545534	2011 PS_{12}	—	August 3, 2011	Haleakala	Pan-STARRS 1	·	2.3 km	MPC · JPL
545535	2011 PC_{14}	—	April 4, 2008	Kitt Peak	Spacewatch	L5	10 km	MPC · JPL
545536	2011 PP_{15}	—	June 18, 2010	Mount Lemmon	Mount Lemmon Survey	·	2.7 km	MPC · JPL
545537	2011 PQ_{15}	—	August 30, 2011	Haleakala	Pan-STARRS 1	EOS	2.0 km	MPC · JPL
545538	2011 PX_{15}	—	October 27, 2014	Haleakala	Pan-STARRS 1	L5	8.6 km	MPC · JPL
545539	2011 PY_{15}	—	October 9, 2013	Mount Lemmon	Mount Lemmon Survey	L5	7.7 km	MPC · JPL
545540	2011 PJ_{16}	—	August 3, 2011	La Sagra	OAM	·	1.6 km	MPC · JPL
545541	2011 PG_{17}	—	May 11, 2015	Mount Lemmon	Mount Lemmon Survey	·	1.7 km	MPC · JPL
545542	2011 PX_{17}	—	May 11, 2015	Mount Lemmon	Mount Lemmon Survey	·	2.6 km	MPC · JPL
545543	2011 PC_{18}	—	November 19, 2012	Kitt Peak	Spacewatch	·	2.6 km	MPC · JPL
545544	2011 PD_{20}	—	September 14, 2013	Mount Lemmon	Mount Lemmon Survey	L5	6.9 km	MPC · JPL
545545	2011 QN	—	August 2, 2011	Haleakala	Pan-STARRS 1	TIN	780 m	MPC · JPL
545546	2011 QY	—	September 20, 2006	Cordell-Lorenz	D. T. Durig, Taylor, A. W.	·	1.6 km	MPC · JPL
545547	2011 QX_{2}	—	August 20, 2011	Pla D'Arguines	R. Ferrando, Ferrando, M.	NAE	2.0 km	MPC · JPL
545548	2011 QA_{4}	—	September 18, 2003	Kitt Peak	Spacewatch	·	2.4 km	MPC · JPL
545549	2011 QS_{4}	—	January 27, 2003	Palomar	NEAT	·	4.3 km	MPC · JPL
545550	2011 QY_{5}	—	June 25, 2011	Mount Lemmon	Mount Lemmon Survey	·	2.0 km	MPC · JPL
545551	2011 QR_{11}	—	August 21, 2011	Haleakala	Pan-STARRS 1	L5	8.0 km	MPC · JPL
545552	2011 QU_{11}	—	April 27, 2009	Mount Lemmon	Mount Lemmon Survey	L5	10 km	MPC · JPL
545553	2011 QG_{12}	—	August 22, 2011	Črni Vrh	Matičič, S.	·	2.5 km	MPC · JPL
545554	2011 QM_{13}	—	August 2, 2011	Črni Vrh	Zakrajsek, J.	DOR	2.8 km	MPC · JPL
545555	2011 QL_{15}	—	November 30, 2005	Kitt Peak	Spacewatch	·	600 m	MPC · JPL
545556	2011 QQ_{18}	—	June 25, 2011	Mount Lemmon	Mount Lemmon Survey	·	3.3 km	MPC · JPL
545557	2011 QT_{20}	—	August 23, 2011	Haleakala	Pan-STARRS 1	EOS	1.5 km	MPC · JPL
545558	2011 QD_{26}	—	October 23, 2001	Palomar	NEAT	EOS	2.8 km	MPC · JPL
545559	2011 QS_{36}	—	August 23, 2011	Haleakala	Pan-STARRS 1	·	1.6 km	MPC · JPL
545560 Fersman	2011 QP_{37}	Fersman	August 27, 2011	Zelenchukskaya Stn	T. V. Krjačko, Satovski, B.	·	650 m	MPC · JPL
545561 Nesbø	2011 QS_{38}	Nesbø	August 26, 2011	Piszkéstető	S. Kürti, K. Sárneczky	·	2.7 km	MPC · JPL
545562	2011 QD_{41}	—	February 25, 2007	Kitt Peak	Spacewatch	L5	6.8 km	MPC · JPL
545563	2011 QQ_{49}	—	October 30, 2007	Kitt Peak	Spacewatch	AGN	1.2 km	MPC · JPL
545564 Sabonis	2011 QA_{50}	Sabonis	August 23, 2011	Baldone	K. Černis, I. Eglītis	L5 · fast	10 km	MPC · JPL
545565 Borysten	2011 QZ_{50}	Borysten	August 27, 2011	Andrushivka	Y. Ivaščenko, Kyrylenko, P.	·	3.2 km	MPC · JPL
545566	2011 QN_{51}	—	September 13, 2006	Palomar	NEAT	(16286)	2.5 km	MPC · JPL
545567	2011 QC_{52}	—	August 28, 2011	Haleakala	Pan-STARRS 1	TEL	1.2 km	MPC · JPL
545568	2011 QN_{58}	—	August 31, 2011	Haleakala	Pan-STARRS 1	·	2.2 km	MPC · JPL
545569	2011 QW_{60}	—	August 31, 2011	Haleakala	Pan-STARRS 1	·	1.4 km	MPC · JPL
545570	2011 QV_{63}	—	August 31, 2011	Haleakala	Pan-STARRS 1	EOS	1.5 km	MPC · JPL
545571 Carlobaccigalupi	2011 QP_{67}	Carlobaccigalupi	August 28, 2011	Andrushivka	Y. Ivaščenko	·	2.2 km	MPC · JPL
545572	2011 QK_{69}	—	June 8, 2011	Mount Lemmon	Mount Lemmon Survey	·	2.3 km	MPC · JPL
545573	2011 QA_{74}	—	September 28, 2006	Kitt Peak	Spacewatch	·	2.7 km	MPC · JPL
545574	2011 QS_{74}	—	July 2, 2011	Mount Lemmon	Mount Lemmon Survey	·	2.6 km	MPC · JPL
545575	2011 QT_{75}	—	July 28, 2011	Haleakala	Pan-STARRS 1	·	1.3 km	MPC · JPL
545576	2011 QK_{79}	—	October 2, 2008	Kitt Peak	Spacewatch	·	620 m	MPC · JPL
545577	2011 QA_{89}	—	July 28, 2011	Haleakala	Pan-STARRS 1	BRA	1.3 km	MPC · JPL
545578	2011 QJ_{96}	—	April 6, 2008	Kitt Peak	Spacewatch	L5	8.8 km	MPC · JPL
545579	2011 QM_{96}	—	March 29, 2008	Kitt Peak	Spacewatch	L5	7.5 km	MPC · JPL
545580	2011 QT_{97}	—	April 2, 2010	WISE	WISE	L5	8.5 km	MPC · JPL
545581	2011 QM_{99}	—	September 22, 2014	Haleakala	Pan-STARRS 1	L5	8.7 km	MPC · JPL
545582	2011 QK_{101}	—	August 23, 2011	Haleakala	Pan-STARRS 1	·	2.6 km	MPC · JPL
545583	2011 QC_{102}	—	November 7, 2012	Mount Lemmon	Mount Lemmon Survey	·	1.8 km	MPC · JPL
545584	2011 QJ_{105}	—	January 31, 2014	Haleakala	Pan-STARRS 1	·	2.6 km	MPC · JPL
545585	2011 QR_{105}	—	December 18, 2007	Mount Lemmon	Mount Lemmon Survey	·	2.3 km	MPC · JPL
545586	2011 QR_{106}	—	February 9, 2014	Kitt Peak	Spacewatch	·	2.5 km	MPC · JPL
545587	2011 QU_{107}	—	October 28, 2013	Mount Lemmon	Mount Lemmon Survey	L5	6.8 km	MPC · JPL
545588	2011 QN_{109}	—	August 24, 2011	Haleakala	Pan-STARRS 1	L5	7.3 km	MPC · JPL
545589	2011 RZ_{1}	—	September 2, 2011	Charleston	R. Holmes	EOS	1.7 km	MPC · JPL
545590	2011 RV_{8}	—	March 13, 2007	Mount Lemmon	Mount Lemmon Survey	·	400 m	MPC · JPL
545591	2011 RM_{19}	—	September 26, 2011	Mount Lemmon	Mount Lemmon Survey	URS	3.0 km	MPC · JPL
545592	2011 RN_{20}	—	September 4, 2011	Haleakala	Pan-STARRS 1	·	3.0 km	MPC · JPL
545593	2011 RT_{20}	—	September 2, 2011	Haleakala	Pan-STARRS 1	·	1.4 km	MPC · JPL
545594	2011 RH_{21}	—	September 4, 2011	Kitt Peak	Spacewatch	EOS	1.6 km	MPC · JPL
545595	2011 RV_{21}	—	September 2, 2011	Haleakala	Pan-STARRS 1	·	2.0 km	MPC · JPL
545596	2011 RA_{22}	—	September 7, 2011	Kitt Peak	Spacewatch	EOS	1.3 km	MPC · JPL
545597	2011 RB_{22}	—	September 7, 2011	Kitt Peak	Spacewatch	·	1.9 km	MPC · JPL
545598	2011 RS_{22}	—	September 2, 2011	Haleakala	Pan-STARRS 1	L5	7.7 km	MPC · JPL
545599	2011 RV_{26}	—	September 4, 2011	Haleakala	Pan-STARRS 1	·	1.6 km	MPC · JPL
545600	2011 SV_{6}	—	January 18, 2008	Kitt Peak	Spacewatch	·	2.9 km	MPC · JPL

== 545601–545700 ==
back to top

Designation			Discovery			Properties		Ref
Permanent	Provisional	Named after	Date	Site	Discoverer(s)	Category	Diam.	Ref
545601	2011 SG_{8}	—	September 26, 2006	Mount Lemmon	Mount Lemmon Survey	TEL	1.0 km	MPC · JPL
545602	2011 SF_{9}	—	September 19, 2011	La Sagra	OAM	·	3.1 km	MPC · JPL
545603	2011 SV_{14}	—	September 18, 2011	Catalina	CSS	TIR	2.5 km	MPC · JPL
545604	2011 SZ_{14}	—	September 2, 2011	Haleakala	Pan-STARRS 1	·	3.0 km	MPC · JPL
545605	2011 SM_{20}	—	October 30, 2006	Catalina	CSS	·	3.1 km	MPC · JPL
545606	2011 SL_{22}	—	May 6, 2008	Mount Lemmon	Mount Lemmon Survey	L5	9.1 km	MPC · JPL
545607	2011 SP_{23}	—	January 31, 2009	Kitt Peak	Spacewatch	·	2.4 km	MPC · JPL
545608	2011 SA_{24}	—	September 20, 2011	Haleakala	Pan-STARRS 1	·	1.9 km	MPC · JPL
545609	2011 SA_{26}	—	September 20, 2011	Mount Lemmon	Mount Lemmon Survey	L5	6.9 km	MPC · JPL
545610	2011 SM_{26}	—	November 24, 2002	Palomar	NEAT	·	3.2 km	MPC · JPL
545611	2011 SG_{28}	—	September 25, 2006	Moletai	K. Černis, Zdanavicius, J.	EOS	2.3 km	MPC · JPL
545612	2011 SV_{37}	—	August 25, 2001	Anderson Mesa	LONEOS	·	790 m	MPC · JPL
545613	2011 SZ_{38}	—	March 24, 2003	Kitt Peak	Spacewatch	·	2.9 km	MPC · JPL
545614	2011 SA_{45}	—	September 23, 2008	Mount Lemmon	Mount Lemmon Survey	·	590 m	MPC · JPL
545615	2011 SC_{45}	—	September 2, 2011	Haleakala	Pan-STARRS 1	·	680 m	MPC · JPL
545616	2011 SG_{45}	—	September 19, 2011	Mount Lemmon	Mount Lemmon Survey	·	2.6 km	MPC · JPL
545617	2011 SM_{46}	—	September 2, 2011	Haleakala	Pan-STARRS 1	EOS	1.6 km	MPC · JPL
545618	2011 SP_{47}	—	November 19, 2007	Kitt Peak	Spacewatch	·	1.5 km	MPC · JPL
545619 Lapuška	2011 SR_{47}	Lapuška	September 3, 2011	Baldone	K. Černis, I. Eglītis	·	2.1 km	MPC · JPL
545620	2011 SQ_{51}	—	October 18, 2006	Kitt Peak	Spacewatch	·	3.0 km	MPC · JPL
545621	2011 SN_{52}	—	September 23, 2011	Mount Lemmon	Mount Lemmon Survey	·	2.2 km	MPC · JPL
545622	2011 SD_{55}	—	September 23, 2011	Haleakala	Pan-STARRS 1	·	1.5 km	MPC · JPL
545623	2011 SJ_{55}	—	September 23, 2011	Haleakala	Pan-STARRS 1	·	2.5 km	MPC · JPL
545624	2011 SD_{56}	—	September 1, 2005	Kitt Peak	Spacewatch	VER	2.4 km	MPC · JPL
545625	2011 SN_{56}	—	October 3, 2006	Mount Lemmon	Mount Lemmon Survey	·	1.2 km	MPC · JPL
545626	2011 SY_{59}	—	September 18, 2011	Catalina	CSS	·	730 m	MPC · JPL
545627	2011 SB_{61}	—	September 20, 2011	Haleakala	Pan-STARRS 1	·	2.4 km	MPC · JPL
545628	2011 SD_{61}	—	August 28, 2011	Piszkéstető	K. Sárneczky	·	2.2 km	MPC · JPL
545629	2011 SR_{62}	—	May 7, 2010	Mount Lemmon	Mount Lemmon Survey	·	3.3 km	MPC · JPL
545630	2011 SA_{63}	—	August 25, 2011	Piszkéstető	K. Sárneczky	·	1.9 km	MPC · JPL
545631	2011 SJ_{63}	—	September 21, 2011	Haleakala	Pan-STARRS 1	·	2.2 km	MPC · JPL
545632	2011 SR_{64}	—	September 23, 2011	Haleakala	Pan-STARRS 1	·	1.9 km	MPC · JPL
545633	2011 SQ_{66}	—	December 3, 2002	Palomar	NEAT	·	3.1 km	MPC · JPL
545634	2011 SF_{69}	—	March 14, 2007	Kitt Peak	Spacewatch	L5	7.1 km	MPC · JPL
545635	2011 SY_{69}	—	January 10, 2008	Mount Lemmon	Mount Lemmon Survey	·	2.3 km	MPC · JPL
545636	2011 SE_{70}	—	September 24, 2011	Haleakala	Pan-STARRS 1	·	2.2 km	MPC · JPL
545637	2011 SF_{70}	—	December 17, 2007	Mount Lemmon	Mount Lemmon Survey	·	2.0 km	MPC · JPL
545638	2011 SJ_{70}	—	August 30, 2011	Haleakala	Pan-STARRS 1	EOS	2.3 km	MPC · JPL
545639	2011 SP_{76}	—	September 20, 2011	Haleakala	Pan-STARRS 1	·	2.1 km	MPC · JPL
545640	2011 SC_{86}	—	September 21, 2011	Kitt Peak	Spacewatch	·	2.2 km	MPC · JPL
545641	2011 SL_{86}	—	September 21, 2011	Kitt Peak	Spacewatch	·	2.6 km	MPC · JPL
545642	2011 SV_{90}	—	August 21, 2006	Kitt Peak	Spacewatch	AGN	1.4 km	MPC · JPL
545643	2011 SH_{93}	—	November 6, 2007	Kitt Peak	Spacewatch	AGN	1.0 km	MPC · JPL
545644	2011 SM_{94}	—	September 24, 2011	Mount Lemmon	Mount Lemmon Survey	AST	1.4 km	MPC · JPL
545645	2011 SW_{99}	—	May 18, 2004	Bergisch Gladbach	W. Bickel	·	2.8 km	MPC · JPL
545646	2011 SD_{100}	—	August 2, 2011	Haleakala	Pan-STARRS 1	·	2.0 km	MPC · JPL
545647	2011 SD_{106}	—	September 23, 2011	Črni Vrh	Zakrajsek, J.	·	2.9 km	MPC · JPL
545648	2011 SU_{107}	—	November 10, 2006	Kitt Peak	Spacewatch	·	3.1 km	MPC · JPL
545649	2011 SX_{108}	—	August 24, 2006	Palomar	NEAT	615	1.7 km	MPC · JPL
545650	2011 SS_{118}	—	September 24, 2011	Catalina	CSS	·	3.0 km	MPC · JPL
545651 Lilyjames	2011 SH_{119}	Lilyjames	September 25, 2011	Mayhill	Falla, N.	·	2.6 km	MPC · JPL
545652	2011 SH_{123}	—	September 22, 2011	Kitt Peak	Spacewatch	H	390 m	MPC · JPL
545653	2011 SZ_{126}	—	December 19, 2007	Mount Lemmon	Mount Lemmon Survey	·	3.4 km	MPC · JPL
545654	2011 SV_{127}	—	September 20, 2011	Kitt Peak	Spacewatch	·	840 m	MPC · JPL
545655	2011 SB_{130}	—	October 4, 2006	Mount Lemmon	Mount Lemmon Survey	·	3.0 km	MPC · JPL
545656	2011 SH_{130}	—	September 23, 2011	Haleakala	Pan-STARRS 1	·	2.8 km	MPC · JPL
545657	2011 SN_{132}	—	September 23, 2011	Kitt Peak	Spacewatch	URS	2.5 km	MPC · JPL
545658	2011 SJ_{137}	—	October 28, 2008	Mount Lemmon	Mount Lemmon Survey	·	610 m	MPC · JPL
545659	2011 SL_{138}	—	October 2, 2006	Mount Lemmon	Mount Lemmon Survey	·	1.6 km	MPC · JPL
545660	2011 SX_{142}	—	November 12, 2006	Mount Lemmon	Mount Lemmon Survey	·	2.0 km	MPC · JPL
545661	2011 SU_{143}	—	September 23, 2011	Haleakala	Pan-STARRS 1	·	1.8 km	MPC · JPL
545662	2011 SO_{146}	—	September 18, 2006	Kitt Peak	Spacewatch	·	1.7 km	MPC · JPL
545663	2011 SH_{154}	—	September 26, 2011	Haleakala	Pan-STARRS 1	·	2.6 km	MPC · JPL
545664	2011 SP_{154}	—	September 17, 2006	Kitt Peak	Spacewatch	·	1.3 km	MPC · JPL
545665	2011 SA_{155}	—	September 15, 2006	Kitt Peak	Spacewatch	·	1.5 km	MPC · JPL
545666	2011 SU_{160}	—	December 19, 2007	Mount Lemmon	Mount Lemmon Survey	EOS	2.1 km	MPC · JPL
545667	2011 SD_{161}	—	September 23, 2011	Kitt Peak	Spacewatch	·	2.3 km	MPC · JPL
545668	2011 SE_{162}	—	August 26, 2005	Anderson Mesa	LONEOS	·	3.4 km	MPC · JPL
545669	2011 SD_{167}	—	October 31, 2006	Mount Lemmon	Mount Lemmon Survey	·	2.2 km	MPC · JPL
545670	2011 SZ_{167}	—	September 17, 2004	Kitt Peak	Spacewatch	·	860 m	MPC · JPL
545671	2011 SJ_{170}	—	November 15, 1995	Kitt Peak	Spacewatch	·	2.2 km	MPC · JPL
545672	2011 SP_{172}	—	September 28, 2011	Mount Lemmon	Mount Lemmon Survey	·	540 m	MPC · JPL
545673	2011 SS_{174}	—	October 17, 2006	Catalina	CSS	EOS	2.4 km	MPC · JPL
545674	2011 SF_{183}	—	September 26, 2011	Kitt Peak	Spacewatch	AGN	1.2 km	MPC · JPL
545675	2011 SS_{183}	—	July 5, 2011	Haleakala	Pan-STARRS 1	·	780 m	MPC · JPL
545676	2011 SU_{184}	—	September 26, 2011	Kitt Peak	Spacewatch	·	1.8 km	MPC · JPL
545677	2011 SG_{187}	—	October 19, 2006	Kitt Peak	Deep Ecliptic Survey	·	2.6 km	MPC · JPL
545678	2011 SH_{188}	—	April 13, 2004	Palomar	NEAT	·	4.1 km	MPC · JPL
545679	2011 SY_{188}	—	September 1, 2005	Palomar	NEAT	·	2.7 km	MPC · JPL
545680	2011 ST_{189}	—	September 20, 2011	Haleakala	Pan-STARRS 1	EOS	1.5 km	MPC · JPL
545681	2011 SY_{189}	—	March 28, 2010	WISE	WISE	·	2.5 km	MPC · JPL
545682	2011 SY_{191}	—	September 24, 2011	Haleakala	Pan-STARRS 1	·	2.2 km	MPC · JPL
545683	2011 SA_{192}	—	August 26, 2011	Kitt Peak	Spacewatch	·	2.3 km	MPC · JPL
545684	2011 SR_{192}	—	October 21, 1995	Kitt Peak	Spacewatch	·	2.0 km	MPC · JPL
545685	2011 SV_{192}	—	September 25, 2011	Taunus	Karge, S., R. Kling	·	720 m	MPC · JPL
545686	2011 SH_{193}	—	September 4, 2011	Haleakala	Pan-STARRS 1	·	1.8 km	MPC · JPL
545687	2011 SM_{193}	—	July 19, 2005	Palomar	NEAT	·	3.4 km	MPC · JPL
545688	2011 SN_{200}	—	September 18, 2011	Catalina	CSS	·	3.1 km	MPC · JPL
545689	2011 SQ_{200}	—	March 26, 2003	Kitt Peak	Spacewatch	VER	2.8 km	MPC · JPL
545690	2011 SF_{201}	—	October 19, 2006	Kitt Peak	Deep Ecliptic Survey	·	1.9 km	MPC · JPL
545691	2011 SF_{202}	—	November 14, 2006	Kitt Peak	Spacewatch	·	1.8 km	MPC · JPL
545692	2011 SB_{204}	—	September 25, 2005	Kitt Peak	Spacewatch	VER	3.0 km	MPC · JPL
545693	2011 SG_{204}	—	August 26, 2005	Palomar	NEAT	VER	3.0 km	MPC · JPL
545694	2011 SW_{205}	—	September 20, 2011	Kitt Peak	Spacewatch	·	2.7 km	MPC · JPL
545695	2011 SN_{211}	—	August 4, 2005	Palomar	NEAT	·	2.7 km	MPC · JPL
545696	2011 SJ_{212}	—	August 28, 2006	Kitt Peak	Spacewatch	·	1.7 km	MPC · JPL
545697	2011 SS_{215}	—	June 26, 2011	Mount Lemmon	Mount Lemmon Survey	EOS	2.0 km	MPC · JPL
545698	2011 SU_{218}	—	July 3, 2005	Palomar	NEAT	EOS	2.6 km	MPC · JPL
545699	2011 SZ_{226}	—	September 29, 2011	Mount Lemmon	Mount Lemmon Survey	·	2.7 km	MPC · JPL
545700	2011 SH_{231}	—	August 27, 2005	Palomar	NEAT	·	2.5 km	MPC · JPL

== 545701–545800 ==
back to top

Designation			Discovery			Properties		Ref
Permanent	Provisional	Named after	Date	Site	Discoverer(s)	Category	Diam.	Ref
545701	2011 SH_{235}	—	September 27, 2011	Bergisch Gladbach	W. Bickel	·	2.6 km	MPC · JPL
545702	2011 SH_{236}	—	September 2, 2011	Haleakala	Pan-STARRS 1	·	2.6 km	MPC · JPL
545703	2011 SB_{237}	—	October 13, 2006	Kitt Peak	Spacewatch	·	3.3 km	MPC · JPL
545704	2011 SH_{238}	—	September 26, 2011	Mount Lemmon	Mount Lemmon Survey	·	2.3 km	MPC · JPL
545705	2011 SG_{242}	—	February 2, 2006	Kitt Peak	Spacewatch	·	590 m	MPC · JPL
545706	2011 SX_{246}	—	October 23, 2006	Kitt Peak	Spacewatch	·	3.3 km	MPC · JPL
545707	2011 SY_{246}	—	September 29, 2011	Mount Lemmon	Mount Lemmon Survey	·	2.1 km	MPC · JPL
545708	2011 SC_{249}	—	September 25, 2006	Kitt Peak	Spacewatch	·	1.9 km	MPC · JPL
545709	2011 SU_{251}	—	February 9, 2008	Mount Lemmon	Mount Lemmon Survey	EOS	1.7 km	MPC · JPL
545710	2011 SD_{254}	—	July 8, 2005	Kitt Peak	Spacewatch	·	2.4 km	MPC · JPL
545711	2011 SB_{258}	—	August 27, 2005	Palomar	NEAT	·	2.7 km	MPC · JPL
545712	2011 SD_{259}	—	September 25, 2011	Haleakala	Pan-STARRS 1	·	2.0 km	MPC · JPL
545713	2011 SG_{260}	—	September 29, 2011	Mount Lemmon	Mount Lemmon Survey	·	3.3 km	MPC · JPL
545714	2011 SQ_{260}	—	August 28, 2005	Kitt Peak	Spacewatch	·	2.1 km	MPC · JPL
545715	2011 SE_{262}	—	August 20, 2011	Haleakala	Pan-STARRS 1	·	520 m	MPC · JPL
545716	2011 SE_{264}	—	August 27, 2011	Haleakala	Pan-STARRS 1	·	1.8 km	MPC · JPL
545717	2011 SY_{264}	—	July 29, 2000	Cerro Tololo	Deep Ecliptic Survey	·	2.5 km	MPC · JPL
545718	2011 SU_{265}	—	January 12, 2008	Kitt Peak	Spacewatch	·	2.2 km	MPC · JPL
545719	2011 SB_{266}	—	October 17, 2006	Catalina	CSS	·	2.3 km	MPC · JPL
545720	2011 SS_{266}	—	August 28, 2006	Kitt Peak	Spacewatch	KOR	1.4 km	MPC · JPL
545721	2011 SF_{270}	—	February 28, 2009	Kitt Peak	Spacewatch	EOS	2.0 km	MPC · JPL
545722	2011 SO_{270}	—	October 18, 2006	Kitt Peak	Spacewatch	·	2.2 km	MPC · JPL
545723	2011 SU_{270}	—	October 20, 2007	Mount Lemmon	Mount Lemmon Survey	·	1.3 km	MPC · JPL
545724	2011 SH_{275}	—	August 27, 2005	Palomar	NEAT	·	3.0 km	MPC · JPL
545725	2011 SZ_{275}	—	April 2, 2009	Mount Lemmon	Mount Lemmon Survey	·	2.9 km	MPC · JPL
545726	2011 SH_{278}	—	September 29, 2011	Mount Lemmon	Mount Lemmon Survey	·	3.0 km	MPC · JPL
545727	2011 SA_{281}	—	September 21, 2011	Mount Lemmon	Mount Lemmon Survey	·	780 m	MPC · JPL
545728	2011 SB_{281}	—	September 23, 2011	Kitt Peak	Spacewatch	H	350 m	MPC · JPL
545729	2011 SG_{282}	—	September 23, 2011	Kitt Peak	Spacewatch	·	3.0 km	MPC · JPL
545730	2011 SQ_{283}	—	March 6, 2014	Mount Lemmon	Mount Lemmon Survey	·	2.6 km	MPC · JPL
545731	2011 SV_{283}	—	September 28, 2011	Kitt Peak	Spacewatch	·	2.1 km	MPC · JPL
545732	2011 SE_{284}	—	September 18, 2011	Mount Lemmon	Mount Lemmon Survey	·	1.6 km	MPC · JPL
545733	2011 SQ_{284}	—	May 21, 2015	Haleakala	Pan-STARRS 1	·	2.3 km	MPC · JPL
545734	2011 SR_{284}	—	September 20, 2011	Haleakala	Pan-STARRS 1	(895)	2.8 km	MPC · JPL
545735	2011 SW_{284}	—	September 24, 2011	Haleakala	Pan-STARRS 1	·	800 m	MPC · JPL
545736	2011 SC_{285}	—	September 26, 2011	Haleakala	Pan-STARRS 1	·	1.9 km	MPC · JPL
545737	2011 SV_{285}	—	September 23, 2011	Haleakala	Pan-STARRS 1	·	2.3 km	MPC · JPL
545738	2011 SA_{286}	—	September 29, 2011	Mount Lemmon	Mount Lemmon Survey	·	1.4 km	MPC · JPL
545739	2011 SG_{286}	—	September 27, 2011	Mount Lemmon	Mount Lemmon Survey	·	1.8 km	MPC · JPL
545740	2011 SP_{287}	—	January 23, 2014	Mount Lemmon	Mount Lemmon Survey	·	2.6 km	MPC · JPL
545741	2011 SZ_{287}	—	May 19, 2015	Haleakala	Pan-STARRS 1	·	2.2 km	MPC · JPL
545742	2011 SA_{295}	—	April 30, 2008	Mount Lemmon	Mount Lemmon Survey	L5	9.1 km	MPC · JPL
545743	2011 SO_{295}	—	September 24, 2011	Mount Lemmon	Mount Lemmon Survey	·	2.7 km	MPC · JPL
545744	2011 SM_{296}	—	September 26, 2011	Mount Lemmon	Mount Lemmon Survey	·	2.4 km	MPC · JPL
545745	2011 SV_{296}	—	January 15, 2013	Nogales	M. Schwartz, P. R. Holvorcem	·	3.3 km	MPC · JPL
545746	2011 SO_{297}	—	March 24, 2003	Kitt Peak	Spacewatch	·	3.5 km	MPC · JPL
545747	2011 ST_{301}	—	September 29, 2011	Mount Lemmon	Mount Lemmon Survey	·	650 m	MPC · JPL
545748	2011 SZ_{301}	—	August 26, 2016	Haleakala	Pan-STARRS 1	·	2.6 km	MPC · JPL
545749	2011 SA_{302}	—	March 24, 2014	Haleakala	Pan-STARRS 1	VER	2.2 km	MPC · JPL
545750	2011 SC_{302}	—	September 24, 2011	Haleakala	Pan-STARRS 1	·	2.4 km	MPC · JPL
545751	2011 SG_{302}	—	September 25, 2011	Haleakala	Pan-STARRS 1	·	580 m	MPC · JPL
545752	2011 SJ_{302}	—	September 27, 2011	Mount Lemmon	Mount Lemmon Survey	·	2.3 km	MPC · JPL
545753	2011 SR_{304}	—	September 30, 2011	Kitt Peak	Spacewatch	·	2.3 km	MPC · JPL
545754	2011 SB_{306}	—	September 24, 2011	Haleakala	Pan-STARRS 1	VER	2.1 km	MPC · JPL
545755	2011 TU_{1}	—	March 19, 2009	Kitt Peak	Spacewatch	EOS	1.8 km	MPC · JPL
545756	2011 TF_{9}	—	August 14, 2001	Haleakala	NEAT	·	760 m	MPC · JPL
545757	2011 TR_{10}	—	February 24, 2009	Catalina	CSS	·	3.1 km	MPC · JPL
545758	2011 TX_{12}	—	August 29, 2005	Palomar	NEAT	·	3.8 km	MPC · JPL
545759	2011 TV_{17}	—	March 31, 2009	Mount Lemmon	Mount Lemmon Survey	THM	2.0 km	MPC · JPL
545760	2011 TN_{18}	—	April 12, 2004	Kitt Peak	Spacewatch	·	2.2 km	MPC · JPL
545761	2011 TR_{19}	—	May 19, 2015	Haleakala	Pan-STARRS 1	·	1.8 km	MPC · JPL
545762	2011 UO_{4}	—	March 21, 2009	Kitt Peak	Spacewatch	·	2.7 km	MPC · JPL
545763	2011 UP_{4}	—	November 15, 2006	Kitt Peak	Spacewatch	HYG	2.5 km	MPC · JPL
545764	2011 UB_{7}	—	October 18, 2011	Mount Lemmon	Mount Lemmon Survey	EOS	1.8 km	MPC · JPL
545765	2011 UO_{8}	—	October 18, 2011	Mount Lemmon	Mount Lemmon Survey	VER	2.6 km	MPC · JPL
545766	2011 UU_{9}	—	July 30, 2005	Palomar	NEAT	EOS	2.1 km	MPC · JPL
545767	2011 UA_{10}	—	September 1, 2005	Palomar	NEAT	TIR	3.6 km	MPC · JPL
545768	2011 UB_{11}	—	September 2, 2011	Haleakala	Pan-STARRS 1	·	2.4 km	MPC · JPL
545769	2011 UP_{11}	—	November 15, 2006	Catalina	CSS	·	3.0 km	MPC · JPL
545770	2011 UY_{11}	—	October 16, 2011	Haleakala	Pan-STARRS 1	·	2.6 km	MPC · JPL
545771	2011 UV_{23}	—	October 1, 2011	Kitt Peak	Spacewatch	·	2.0 km	MPC · JPL
545772	2011 UV_{26}	—	August 31, 2005	Anderson Mesa	LONEOS	·	3.3 km	MPC · JPL
545773	2011 UN_{32}	—	October 18, 2011	Piszkéstető	K. Sárneczky, A. Szing	·	2.9 km	MPC · JPL
545774	2011 UK_{35}	—	December 20, 2000	Kitt Peak	Deep Lens Survey	·	2.8 km	MPC · JPL
545775	2011 UF_{38}	—	July 11, 2005	Mount Lemmon	Mount Lemmon Survey	·	1.8 km	MPC · JPL
545776	2011 UC_{43}	—	October 19, 2011	Mount Lemmon	Mount Lemmon Survey	·	3.2 km	MPC · JPL
545777	2011 UK_{43}	—	January 19, 2008	Mount Lemmon	Mount Lemmon Survey	·	1.7 km	MPC · JPL
545778	2011 US_{43}	—	October 19, 2011	Mount Lemmon	Mount Lemmon Survey	·	670 m	MPC · JPL
545779	2011 UQ_{44}	—	September 30, 2006	Catalina	CSS	·	1.5 km	MPC · JPL
545780	2011 UY_{46}	—	January 18, 2009	Kitt Peak	Spacewatch	·	840 m	MPC · JPL
545781	2011 UR_{48}	—	October 18, 2011	Kitt Peak	Spacewatch	HYG	2.3 km	MPC · JPL
545782	2011 UC_{50}	—	September 21, 2011	Les Engarouines	L. Bernasconi	·	2.3 km	MPC · JPL
545783	2011 UZ_{51}	—	October 18, 2011	Kitt Peak	Spacewatch	·	2.0 km	MPC · JPL
545784 Kelemenjános	2011 UA_{57}	Kelemenjános	October 18, 2011	Piszkéstető	K. Sárneczky, A. Szing	EOS	1.8 km	MPC · JPL
545785	2011 UD_{57}	—	September 24, 2011	Haleakala	Pan-STARRS 1	·	1.3 km	MPC · JPL
545786	2011 UH_{59}	—	September 23, 2011	Haleakala	Pan-STARRS 1	(2076)	770 m	MPC · JPL
545787	2011 UW_{62}	—	October 20, 2011	Siding Spring	SSS	·	510 m	MPC · JPL
545788	2011 UQ_{65}	—	September 28, 2011	Kitt Peak	Spacewatch	·	2.1 km	MPC · JPL
545789	2011 UY_{68}	—	October 13, 2006	Kitt Peak	Spacewatch	·	2.6 km	MPC · JPL
545790	2011 UF_{69}	—	September 29, 2011	Mount Lemmon	Mount Lemmon Survey	EOS	1.7 km	MPC · JPL
545791	2011 UJ_{70}	—	August 5, 2005	Palomar	NEAT	·	3.9 km	MPC · JPL
545792	2011 UC_{73}	—	September 1, 2005	Wrightwood	J. W. Young	EOS	2.2 km	MPC · JPL
545793	2011 US_{75}	—	September 6, 2010	Mount Lemmon	Mount Lemmon Survey	·	4.0 km	MPC · JPL
545794	2011 UG_{86}	—	October 20, 2011	Mount Lemmon	Mount Lemmon Survey	·	2.0 km	MPC · JPL
545795	2011 UN_{86}	—	October 5, 2005	Catalina	CSS	·	3.7 km	MPC · JPL
545796	2011 UY_{86}	—	January 28, 2006	Mount Lemmon	Mount Lemmon Survey	·	680 m	MPC · JPL
545797	2011 UD_{87}	—	September 22, 2011	Kitt Peak	Spacewatch	·	610 m	MPC · JPL
545798	2011 US_{89}	—	October 21, 2011	Mount Lemmon	Mount Lemmon Survey	·	2.8 km	MPC · JPL
545799	2011 UT_{93}	—	September 28, 2011	Mount Lemmon	Mount Lemmon Survey	·	2.2 km	MPC · JPL
545800	2011 US_{97}	—	September 30, 2011	Kitt Peak	Spacewatch	EOS	1.8 km	MPC · JPL

== 545801–545900 ==
back to top

Designation			Discovery			Properties		Ref
Permanent	Provisional	Named after	Date	Site	Discoverer(s)	Category	Diam.	Ref
545801	2011 UF_{98}	—	October 20, 2011	Kitt Peak	Spacewatch	·	3.3 km	MPC · JPL
545802	2011 UL_{100}	—	October 20, 2011	Mount Lemmon	Mount Lemmon Survey	EOS	1.6 km	MPC · JPL
545803	2011 UW_{109}	—	July 31, 2005	Palomar	NEAT	·	3.4 km	MPC · JPL
545804	2011 UD_{110}	—	September 21, 2011	Kitt Peak	Spacewatch	·	2.6 km	MPC · JPL
545805	2011 US_{110}	—	October 21, 2011	Mount Lemmon	Mount Lemmon Survey	EOS	1.7 km	MPC · JPL
545806	2011 UU_{113}	—	September 29, 2005	Mount Lemmon	Mount Lemmon Survey	THM	1.8 km	MPC · JPL
545807	2011 UB_{114}	—	September 25, 2005	Catalina	CSS	THM	2.7 km	MPC · JPL
545808	2011 UY_{116}	—	June 14, 2005	Mount Lemmon	Mount Lemmon Survey	·	2.6 km	MPC · JPL
545809	2011 UA_{117}	—	October 18, 2011	Siding Spring	SSS	EOS	2.1 km	MPC · JPL
545810	2011 UA_{118}	—	September 18, 2011	Mount Lemmon	Mount Lemmon Survey	·	3.5 km	MPC · JPL
545811	2011 UC_{118}	—	November 24, 2006	Catalina	CSS	·	2.8 km	MPC · JPL
545812	2011 UM_{118}	—	September 28, 2011	Mount Lemmon	Mount Lemmon Survey	·	3.5 km	MPC · JPL
545813	2011 UD_{121}	—	July 29, 2005	Palomar	NEAT	·	4.3 km	MPC · JPL
545814	2011 UB_{122}	—	February 8, 2008	Mount Lemmon	Mount Lemmon Survey	·	2.1 km	MPC · JPL
545815	2011 UE_{125}	—	October 19, 2011	Mount Lemmon	Mount Lemmon Survey	·	680 m	MPC · JPL
545816	2011 UN_{126}	—	October 20, 2011	Kitt Peak	Spacewatch	·	2.1 km	MPC · JPL
545817	2011 UY_{131}	—	September 23, 2011	Mount Lemmon	Mount Lemmon Survey	ELF	2.9 km	MPC · JPL
545818	2011 UR_{132}	—	November 23, 2006	Kitt Peak	Spacewatch	EOS	1.7 km	MPC · JPL
545819	2011 UT_{133}	—	September 24, 2011	Haleakala	Pan-STARRS 1	EOS	1.7 km	MPC · JPL
545820	2011 UO_{134}	—	April 17, 2009	Kitt Peak	Spacewatch	·	3.3 km	MPC · JPL
545821	2011 UD_{135}	—	October 19, 2011	Kitt Peak	Spacewatch	·	1.9 km	MPC · JPL
545822	2011 UR_{136}	—	October 20, 2011	Mount Lemmon	Mount Lemmon Survey	·	2.2 km	MPC · JPL
545823	2011 UE_{137}	—	July 7, 2005	Kitt Peak	Spacewatch	·	1.9 km	MPC · JPL
545824	2011 UQ_{143}	—	October 23, 2011	Haleakala	Pan-STARRS 1	TIR	2.1 km	MPC · JPL
545825	2011 UN_{148}	—	October 22, 2011	Kitt Peak	Spacewatch	·	2.3 km	MPC · JPL
545826	2011 UB_{149}	—	August 4, 2005	Palomar	NEAT	·	2.5 km	MPC · JPL
545827	2011 UH_{151}	—	October 24, 2011	Mount Lemmon	Mount Lemmon Survey	·	2.5 km	MPC · JPL
545828	2011 UD_{154}	—	October 1, 2011	Piszkéstető	K. Sárneczky	·	3.2 km	MPC · JPL
545829	2011 US_{159}	—	February 24, 2006	Kitt Peak	Spacewatch	·	640 m	MPC · JPL
545830	2011 UG_{162}	—	May 27, 2009	Mount Lemmon	Mount Lemmon Survey	EOS	2.5 km	MPC · JPL
545831	2011 UX_{165}	—	August 31, 2005	Palomar	NEAT	·	3.4 km	MPC · JPL
545832	2011 UP_{166}	—	October 26, 2011	Haleakala	Pan-STARRS 1	·	3.5 km	MPC · JPL
545833	2011 UL_{168}	—	September 20, 2011	Mount Lemmon	Mount Lemmon Survey	EOS	1.4 km	MPC · JPL
545834	2011 UY_{168}	—	October 1, 2011	Kitt Peak	Spacewatch	·	2.7 km	MPC · JPL
545835	2011 UC_{171}	—	October 21, 2011	Haleakala	Pan-STARRS 1	·	1.6 km	MPC · JPL
545836	2011 UE_{171}	—	October 4, 2006	Mount Lemmon	Mount Lemmon Survey	·	2.0 km	MPC · JPL
545837	2011 UQ_{171}	—	September 11, 2005	Kitt Peak	Spacewatch	·	3.0 km	MPC · JPL
545838	2011 UV_{171}	—	September 29, 2011	Piszkéstető	K. Sárneczky	VER	2.3 km	MPC · JPL
545839 Hernánletelier	2011 UC_{172}	Hernánletelier	September 21, 2011	Zelenchukskaya Stn	T. V. Krjačko, Satovski, B.	·	1.9 km	MPC · JPL
545840	2011 UL_{172}	—	July 27, 2001	Anderson Mesa	LONEOS	·	610 m	MPC · JPL
545841	2011 UE_{173}	—	September 22, 2011	Catalina	CSS	·	1.8 km	MPC · JPL
545842	2011 UV_{174}	—	October 23, 2011	Haleakala	Pan-STARRS 1	·	2.5 km	MPC · JPL
545843	2011 UM_{176}	—	October 20, 2011	Mount Lemmon	Mount Lemmon Survey	·	2.4 km	MPC · JPL
545844	2011 UF_{177}	—	October 24, 2011	Kitt Peak	Spacewatch	·	550 m	MPC · JPL
545845	2011 UJ_{179}	—	March 31, 2009	Mount Lemmon	Mount Lemmon Survey	·	3.5 km	MPC · JPL
545846	2011 UF_{183}	—	October 25, 2011	Haleakala	Pan-STARRS 1	·	960 m	MPC · JPL
545847	2011 UA_{185}	—	December 13, 2006	Kitt Peak	Spacewatch	·	2.8 km	MPC · JPL
545848	2011 US_{187}	—	September 24, 2011	Haleakala	Pan-STARRS 1	·	590 m	MPC · JPL
545849	2011 UC_{191}	—	September 24, 2011	Mount Lemmon	Mount Lemmon Survey	·	2.9 km	MPC · JPL
545850	2011 UB_{201}	—	September 2, 2005	Palomar	NEAT	·	3.4 km	MPC · JPL
545851	2011 UG_{201}	—	March 17, 2009	Mount Lemmon	Mount Lemmon Survey	·	1.2 km	MPC · JPL
545852	2011 UN_{201}	—	October 9, 2008	Mount Lemmon	Mount Lemmon Survey	·	530 m	MPC · JPL
545853	2011 UD_{206}	—	December 31, 2008	Kitt Peak	Spacewatch	·	780 m	MPC · JPL
545854	2011 UP_{208}	—	September 30, 2011	Kitt Peak	Spacewatch	·	2.4 km	MPC · JPL
545855	2011 UF_{209}	—	May 31, 2009	Mount Lemmon	Mount Lemmon Survey	·	2.7 km	MPC · JPL
545856	2011 UD_{212}	—	October 24, 2011	Mount Lemmon	Mount Lemmon Survey	·	3.5 km	MPC · JPL
545857	2011 UK_{217}	—	October 24, 2011	Mount Lemmon	Mount Lemmon Survey	·	2.1 km	MPC · JPL
545858	2011 UC_{218}	—	August 31, 2005	Kitt Peak	Spacewatch	THM	2.2 km	MPC · JPL
545859	2011 UY_{219}	—	October 24, 2011	Mount Lemmon	Mount Lemmon Survey	·	2.6 km	MPC · JPL
545860	2011 UZ_{219}	—	September 28, 2011	Kitt Peak	Spacewatch	·	2.8 km	MPC · JPL
545861	2011 UE_{221}	—	February 26, 2008	Kitt Peak	Spacewatch	·	2.2 km	MPC · JPL
545862	2011 UF_{223}	—	October 29, 2006	Kitt Peak	Spacewatch	·	1.8 km	MPC · JPL
545863	2011 UC_{235}	—	April 5, 2008	Mount Lemmon	Mount Lemmon Survey	·	2.9 km	MPC · JPL
545864	2011 US_{237}	—	September 3, 2010	Mount Lemmon	Mount Lemmon Survey	·	3.6 km	MPC · JPL
545865	2011 UJ_{239}	—	October 24, 2011	Haleakala	Pan-STARRS 1	·	2.5 km	MPC · JPL
545866	2011 UA_{240}	—	September 24, 2011	Mount Lemmon	Mount Lemmon Survey	·	2.5 km	MPC · JPL
545867	2011 UV_{244}	—	October 18, 2011	Kitt Peak	Spacewatch	·	540 m	MPC · JPL
545868	2011 UF_{245}	—	April 15, 2007	Kitt Peak	Spacewatch	·	510 m	MPC · JPL
545869	2011 UE_{248}	—	August 29, 2001	Palomar	NEAT	·	680 m	MPC · JPL
545870	2011 UR_{252}	—	September 24, 2006	Catalina	CSS	H	500 m	MPC · JPL
545871	2011 UU_{252}	—	October 26, 2011	Haleakala	Pan-STARRS 1	·	2.9 km	MPC · JPL
545872	2011 UK_{255}	—	September 29, 2011	Kitt Peak	Spacewatch	·	2.7 km	MPC · JPL
545873	2011 UP_{259}	—	October 24, 2011	Haleakala	Pan-STARRS 1	·	2.5 km	MPC · JPL
545874	2011 UJ_{261}	—	October 30, 2005	Kitt Peak	Spacewatch	·	3.1 km	MPC · JPL
545875	2011 UM_{263}	—	October 25, 2011	Haleakala	Pan-STARRS 1	·	730 m	MPC · JPL
545876	2011 UK_{266}	—	October 26, 2011	Haleakala	Pan-STARRS 1	·	640 m	MPC · JPL
545877	2011 UR_{266}	—	September 24, 2011	Haleakala	Pan-STARRS 1	·	2.4 km	MPC · JPL
545878	2011 UM_{269}	—	September 28, 2011	Kitt Peak	Spacewatch	·	710 m	MPC · JPL
545879	2011 UU_{269}	—	October 19, 2011	Kitt Peak	Spacewatch	·	2.5 km	MPC · JPL
545880	2011 UD_{272}	—	October 30, 2011	Mount Lemmon	Mount Lemmon Survey	·	2.3 km	MPC · JPL
545881	2011 UG_{273}	—	April 26, 2004	Kitt Peak	Spacewatch	·	2.4 km	MPC · JPL
545882	2011 UC_{277}	—	December 18, 2004	Mount Lemmon	Mount Lemmon Survey	·	990 m	MPC · JPL
545883	2011 UD_{278}	—	September 29, 2005	Catalina	CSS	·	2.7 km	MPC · JPL
545884	2011 UW_{281}	—	October 20, 2011	Kitt Peak	Spacewatch	·	3.1 km	MPC · JPL
545885	2011 UQ_{283}	—	December 24, 2006	Kitt Peak	Spacewatch	·	3.5 km	MPC · JPL
545886	2011 UG_{288}	—	October 28, 2011	Mount Lemmon	Mount Lemmon Survey	·	2.6 km	MPC · JPL
545887	2011 UJ_{289}	—	September 24, 2011	Haleakala	Pan-STARRS 1	·	890 m	MPC · JPL
545888	2011 UV_{291}	—	September 24, 2011	Haleakala	Pan-STARRS 1	·	2.7 km	MPC · JPL
545889	2011 UT_{292}	—	October 26, 2011	Kitt Peak	Spacewatch	·	2.4 km	MPC · JPL
545890	2011 UG_{293}	—	October 26, 2011	Haleakala	Pan-STARRS 1	·	550 m	MPC · JPL
545891	2011 UF_{301}	—	September 4, 2011	Haleakala	Pan-STARRS 1	·	3.0 km	MPC · JPL
545892	2011 UT_{302}	—	December 17, 2007	Mount Lemmon	Mount Lemmon Survey	AGN	1.1 km	MPC · JPL
545893	2011 US_{303}	—	September 28, 2011	Kitt Peak	Spacewatch	·	3.0 km	MPC · JPL
545894	2011 UK_{304}	—	October 31, 2011	Mount Lemmon	Mount Lemmon Survey	·	1.6 km	MPC · JPL
545895	2011 UL_{305}	—	August 27, 2005	Palomar	NEAT	·	3.4 km	MPC · JPL
545896	2011 UA_{306}	—	September 24, 2011	Haleakala	Pan-STARRS 1	·	3.5 km	MPC · JPL
545897	2011 UH_{306}	—	September 20, 2011	Kitt Peak	Spacewatch	·	1.7 km	MPC · JPL
545898	2011 UY_{309}	—	September 23, 2011	Kitt Peak	Spacewatch	URS	3.3 km	MPC · JPL
545899	2011 UZ_{309}	—	April 24, 2009	Mount Lemmon	Mount Lemmon Survey	·	2.9 km	MPC · JPL
545900	2011 UU_{311}	—	March 18, 2010	Kitt Peak	Spacewatch	·	600 m	MPC · JPL

== 545901–546000 ==
back to top

Designation			Discovery			Properties		Ref
Permanent	Provisional	Named after	Date	Site	Discoverer(s)	Category	Diam.	Ref
545901	2011 UQ_{316}	—	April 1, 2009	Kitt Peak	Spacewatch	·	2.6 km	MPC · JPL
545902	2011 UT_{316}	—	October 30, 2011	Kitt Peak	Spacewatch	·	830 m	MPC · JPL
545903	2011 UU_{316}	—	August 26, 2005	Palomar	NEAT	·	2.3 km	MPC · JPL
545904	2011 UC_{320}	—	October 30, 2011	Kitt Peak	Spacewatch	·	3.2 km	MPC · JPL
545905	2011 UT_{321}	—	October 31, 2011	Mayhill-ISON	L. Elenin	·	3.0 km	MPC · JPL
545906	2011 UC_{322}	—	October 31, 2011	Bergisch Gladbach	W. Bickel	·	760 m	MPC · JPL
545907	2011 UG_{322}	—	October 28, 2011	San Pedro de Atacama	J. L. Ortiz, I. de la Cueva	H	480 m	MPC · JPL
545908	2011 UL_{323}	—	August 26, 2005	Palomar	NEAT	·	2.8 km	MPC · JPL
545909	2011 UO_{326}	—	July 28, 2005	Palomar	NEAT	·	3.0 km	MPC · JPL
545910	2011 UR_{327}	—	October 22, 2011	Mount Lemmon	Mount Lemmon Survey	EOS	1.9 km	MPC · JPL
545911	2011 US_{328}	—	November 2, 2000	Kitt Peak	Spacewatch	VER	2.2 km	MPC · JPL
545912	2011 UZ_{328}	—	October 23, 2011	Mount Lemmon	Mount Lemmon Survey	·	2.6 km	MPC · JPL
545913	2011 UM_{329}	—	September 1, 2005	Palomar	NEAT	·	3.3 km	MPC · JPL
545914	2011 UV_{332}	—	October 21, 2006	Mount Lemmon	Mount Lemmon Survey	·	4.5 km	MPC · JPL
545915	2011 UA_{333}	—	February 11, 2008	Kitt Peak	Spacewatch	VER	3.2 km	MPC · JPL
545916	2011 UC_{333}	—	October 28, 2011	Mount Lemmon	Mount Lemmon Survey	·	2.3 km	MPC · JPL
545917	2011 UH_{333}	—	September 25, 2011	Haleakala	Pan-STARRS 1	·	2.5 km	MPC · JPL
545918	2011 UC_{335}	—	August 26, 2011	Kitt Peak	Spacewatch	·	3.3 km	MPC · JPL
545919	2011 UP_{337}	—	September 23, 2011	Kitt Peak	Spacewatch	·	3.2 km	MPC · JPL
545920	2011 UG_{340}	—	October 17, 2006	Mount Lemmon	Mount Lemmon Survey	EOS	2.2 km	MPC · JPL
545921	2011 UW_{341}	—	September 30, 2011	Kitt Peak	Spacewatch	·	2.7 km	MPC · JPL
545922	2011 UG_{342}	—	September 28, 2011	Mount Lemmon	Mount Lemmon Survey	·	2.5 km	MPC · JPL
545923	2011 UV_{342}	—	March 19, 2009	Mount Lemmon	Mount Lemmon Survey	·	2.7 km	MPC · JPL
545924	2011 UK_{346}	—	November 17, 2006	Kitt Peak	Spacewatch	·	3.5 km	MPC · JPL
545925	2011 UQ_{349}	—	September 28, 2011	Mount Lemmon	Mount Lemmon Survey	·	2.1 km	MPC · JPL
545926	2011 UR_{350}	—	October 19, 2011	Mount Lemmon	Mount Lemmon Survey	·	580 m	MPC · JPL
545927	2011 UY_{350}	—	September 22, 2011	Kitt Peak	Spacewatch	·	2.6 km	MPC · JPL
545928	2011 UN_{351}	—	January 16, 2009	Mount Lemmon	Mount Lemmon Survey	·	790 m	MPC · JPL
545929	2011 UZ_{351}	—	October 20, 2011	Kitt Peak	Spacewatch	·	3.4 km	MPC · JPL
545930	2011 UC_{357}	—	September 28, 2011	Kitt Peak	Spacewatch	·	2.4 km	MPC · JPL
545931	2011 UJ_{357}	—	December 3, 2007	Kitt Peak	Spacewatch	AGN	1.1 km	MPC · JPL
545932	2011 UL_{358}	—	May 19, 2010	Mount Lemmon	Mount Lemmon Survey	·	2.4 km	MPC · JPL
545933	2011 UY_{360}	—	October 21, 2011	McGraw-Hill	Campbell, R.	·	2.4 km	MPC · JPL
545934	2011 UA_{366}	—	October 22, 2011	Mount Lemmon	Mount Lemmon Survey	(1118)	2.6 km	MPC · JPL
545935	2011 UH_{368}	—	September 11, 2005	Kitt Peak	Spacewatch	·	2.3 km	MPC · JPL
545936	2011 UL_{372}	—	January 18, 2008	Kitt Peak	Spacewatch	·	2.4 km	MPC · JPL
545937	2011 UV_{373}	—	October 23, 2011	Mount Lemmon	Mount Lemmon Survey	·	1.8 km	MPC · JPL
545938	2011 UF_{380}	—	October 24, 2011	Kitt Peak	Spacewatch	EOS	1.6 km	MPC · JPL
545939	2011 UA_{382}	—	January 3, 2009	Kitt Peak	Spacewatch	·	610 m	MPC · JPL
545940	2011 UK_{382}	—	November 27, 2006	Mount Lemmon	Mount Lemmon Survey	EOS	2.2 km	MPC · JPL
545941	2011 UM_{382}	—	August 26, 2005	Palomar	NEAT	·	2.4 km	MPC · JPL
545942	2011 UU_{384}	—	October 24, 2011	Haleakala	Pan-STARRS 1	·	3.1 km	MPC · JPL
545943	2011 UX_{387}	—	September 24, 2005	Kitt Peak	Spacewatch	VER	2.7 km	MPC · JPL
545944	2011 UW_{393}	—	September 24, 2011	Haleakala	Pan-STARRS 1	·	2.3 km	MPC · JPL
545945	2011 UO_{397}	—	September 25, 2011	Haleakala	Pan-STARRS 1	·	2.3 km	MPC · JPL
545946	2011 UM_{401}	—	June 17, 2010	Nogales	M. Schwartz, P. R. Holvorcem	·	2.2 km	MPC · JPL
545947	2011 UP_{403}	—	October 24, 2011	Haleakala	Pan-STARRS 1	T_{j} (2.94)	3.6 km	MPC · JPL
545948	2011 US_{405}	—	October 3, 2011	Piszkéstető	K. Sárneczky	·	3.7 km	MPC · JPL
545949	2011 UD_{407}	—	November 23, 2002	Palomar	NEAT	·	1.8 km	MPC · JPL
545950	2011 UQ_{407}	—	February 12, 2008	Mount Lemmon	Mount Lemmon Survey	·	3.0 km	MPC · JPL
545951	2011 UV_{407}	—	October 19, 2011	Palomar	Palomar Transient Factory	·	2.0 km	MPC · JPL
545952	2011 UB_{414}	—	August 31, 2005	Palomar	NEAT	·	3.1 km	MPC · JPL
545953	2011 UQ_{414}	—	October 19, 2011	Mount Lemmon	Mount Lemmon Survey	VER	2.4 km	MPC · JPL
545954	2011 UW_{416}	—	October 24, 2011	Haleakala	Pan-STARRS 1	KOR	990 m	MPC · JPL
545955	2011 UU_{418}	—	June 16, 2010	Mount Lemmon	Mount Lemmon Survey	(5)	1.1 km	MPC · JPL
545956	2011 UZ_{418}	—	October 25, 2011	Haleakala	Pan-STARRS 1	·	580 m	MPC · JPL
545957	2011 UL_{419}	—	October 26, 2011	Haleakala	Pan-STARRS 1	·	3.8 km	MPC · JPL
545958	2011 UP_{420}	—	January 16, 2013	ESA OGS	ESA OGS	EOS	1.8 km	MPC · JPL
545959	2011 UQ_{420}	—	February 8, 2008	Mount Lemmon	Mount Lemmon Survey	·	2.6 km	MPC · JPL
545960	2011 UR_{420}	—	July 11, 2016	Haleakala	Pan-STARRS 1	·	1.8 km	MPC · JPL
545961	2011 UV_{420}	—	May 9, 2010	WISE	WISE	·	3.2 km	MPC · JPL
545962	2011 UW_{420}	—	April 7, 2014	Mount Lemmon	Mount Lemmon Survey	·	3.0 km	MPC · JPL
545963	2011 UZ_{420}	—	October 24, 2011	Haleakala	Pan-STARRS 1	·	2.7 km	MPC · JPL
545964	2011 UE_{421}	—	October 20, 2011	Mount Lemmon	Mount Lemmon Survey	·	2.4 km	MPC · JPL
545965	2011 UJ_{421}	—	October 25, 2011	Haleakala	Pan-STARRS 1	VER	2.7 km	MPC · JPL
545966	2011 UR_{421}	—	October 27, 2011	Mount Lemmon	Mount Lemmon Survey	VER	2.2 km	MPC · JPL
545967	2011 UB_{422}	—	April 10, 2014	Haleakala	Pan-STARRS 1	EUP	3.0 km	MPC · JPL
545968	2011 UP_{422}	—	December 15, 2006	Kitt Peak	Spacewatch	·	2.2 km	MPC · JPL
545969	2011 UX_{423}	—	January 29, 2014	Kitt Peak	Spacewatch	EOS	1.9 km	MPC · JPL
545970	2011 UB_{424}	—	October 17, 2011	Kitt Peak	Spacewatch	·	2.8 km	MPC · JPL
545971	2011 UO_{424}	—	October 18, 2011	Mount Lemmon	Mount Lemmon Survey	·	3.0 km	MPC · JPL
545972	2011 UC_{425}	—	January 3, 2017	Haleakala	Pan-STARRS 1	L5	8.2 km	MPC · JPL
545973	2011 UD_{427}	—	October 25, 2011	Haleakala	Pan-STARRS 1	·	660 m	MPC · JPL
545974	2011 UB_{434}	—	October 23, 2017	Mount Lemmon	Mount Lemmon Survey	·	3.1 km	MPC · JPL
545975	2011 US_{435}	—	October 25, 2011	Haleakala	Pan-STARRS 1	·	2.4 km	MPC · JPL
545976	2011 UZ_{436}	—	January 7, 2014	Mount Lemmon	Mount Lemmon Survey	·	3.0 km	MPC · JPL
545977	2011 UV_{441}	—	October 22, 2011	Mount Lemmon	Mount Lemmon Survey	·	990 m	MPC · JPL
545978	2011 UZ_{443}	—	March 6, 2014	ESA OGS	ESA OGS	·	2.5 km	MPC · JPL
545979	2011 VH	—	September 27, 2011	Les Engarouines	L. Bernasconi	·	1.1 km	MPC · JPL
545980	2011 VC_{1}	—	October 14, 2004	Palomar	NEAT	·	920 m	MPC · JPL
545981	2011 VQ_{1}	—	May 6, 2006	Mount Lemmon	Mount Lemmon Survey	·	510 m	MPC · JPL
545982	2011 VS_{2}	—	November 1, 2011	Mount Lemmon	Mount Lemmon Survey	·	2.8 km	MPC · JPL
545983	2011 VW_{6}	—	October 25, 2011	Haleakala	Pan-STARRS 1	·	2.9 km	MPC · JPL
545984	2011 VW_{9}	—	September 28, 2011	Mount Lemmon	Mount Lemmon Survey	·	1.1 km	MPC · JPL
545985 Galinaermolenko	2011 VW_{10}	Galinaermolenko	November 3, 2011	Zelenchukskaya Stn	T. V. Krjačko, Satovski, B.	·	650 m	MPC · JPL
545986	2011 VB_{13}	—	October 18, 2011	Mount Lemmon	Mount Lemmon Survey	·	530 m	MPC · JPL
545987	2011 VW_{18}	—	October 22, 2011	Kitt Peak	Spacewatch	·	2.2 km	MPC · JPL
545988	2011 VM_{19}	—	October 18, 2011	Kitt Peak	Spacewatch	·	610 m	MPC · JPL
545989	2011 VW_{21}	—	August 25, 2005	Campo Imperatore	CINEOS	·	1.8 km	MPC · JPL
545990	2011 VA_{23}	—	September 29, 2006	Anderson Mesa	LONEOS	·	2.1 km	MPC · JPL
545991	2011 VL_{25}	—	November 1, 2011	Mount Lemmon	Mount Lemmon Survey	·	4.1 km	MPC · JPL
545992	2011 VF_{26}	—	August 15, 2014	Haleakala	Pan-STARRS 1	·	620 m	MPC · JPL
545993	2011 VS_{27}	—	April 30, 2014	Haleakala	Pan-STARRS 1	EOS	2.1 km	MPC · JPL
545994	2011 VM_{29}	—	September 30, 2017	Haleakala	Pan-STARRS 1	VER	2.0 km	MPC · JPL
545995	2011 WG_{6}	—	November 16, 2011	Mount Lemmon	Mount Lemmon Survey	·	2.9 km	MPC · JPL
545996	2011 WV_{6}	—	April 29, 2009	Mount Lemmon	Mount Lemmon Survey	·	2.8 km	MPC · JPL
545997	2011 WX_{6}	—	October 30, 2011	Kitt Peak	Spacewatch	VER	2.4 km	MPC · JPL
545998	2011 WA_{10}	—	October 30, 2011	Kitt Peak	Spacewatch	·	630 m	MPC · JPL
545999	2011 WE_{15}	—	October 24, 2005	Palomar	NEAT	·	4.4 km	MPC · JPL
546000	2011 WW_{20}	—	May 13, 2009	Kitt Peak	Spacewatch	·	3.1 km	MPC · JPL

back to top

== Meaning of names ==
As minor planet discoveries are confirmed, they are given a permanent number by the IAU's Minor Planet Center (MPC), and the discoverers can then submit names for them, following the IAU's naming conventions. The list below concerns those minor planets in the specified number-range that have received names, and explains the meanings of those names.

Official naming citations of newly named small Solar System bodies are approved and published in a bulletin by IAU's Working Group for Small Bodies Nomenclature (WGSBN). Before May 2021, citations were published in MPC's Minor Planet Circulars for many decades. Recent citations can also be found on the JPL Small-Body Database (SBDB). Until his death in 2016, German astronomer Lutz D. Schmadel compiled these citations into the Dictionary of Minor Planet Names (DMP) and regularly updated the collection.

Based on Paul Herget's The Names of the Minor Planets, Schmadel also researched the unclear origin of numerous asteroids, most of which had been named prior to World War II. This article incorporates text from this source, which is in the public domain: SBDB New namings may only be added to this list below after official publication as the preannouncement of names is condemned. The WGSBN publishes a comprehensive guideline for the naming rules of non-cometary small Solar System bodies.

Named minor planet	Provisional	This minor planet was named for...	Ref · Catalog
545060 Drapáljános	2014 YN_{17}	János Drapál, Hungarian motorcycle road racer who was a ninetime national champion.	IAU · 545060
545167 Bonfini	2011 BF_{42}	Antonio Bonfini (1427–1502) was an Italian humanist and the court historian for Matthias Corvinus, the king of Hungary.	IAU · 545167
545394 Rossetter	2011 HH_{45}	David Rossetter (born 1956) is an American amateur astronomer.	IAU · 545394
545560 Fersman	2011 QP_{37}	Alexander E. Fersman (1883–1945), Russian geologist and mineralogist who cofounded Russia's Meteorite Committee.	IAU · 545560
545561 Nesbø	2011 QS_{38}	Jo Nesbø (born 1960), Norwegian writer and musician.	IAU · 545561
545564 Sabonis	2011 QA_{50}	Arvydas Sabonis (born 1964) is a retired Lithuanian professional basketball player and businessman. Sabonis won a gold medal at the 1988 Summer Olympics, and bronze medals at the 1992 and 1996 Olympic Games.	IAU · 545564
545565 Borysten	2011 QZ_{50}	Mykola Khomychevsky (1897–1983), known by his pen-name Borys Ten, was a Ukrainian writer, poet, composer, translator, and a priest by education, whose best-known work includes the translation of Homer's Odyssey and Iliad into the Ukrainian language.	IAU · 545565
545571 Carlobaccigalupi	2011 QP_{67}	Carlo Baccigalupi (b. 1968), an Italian astronomer.	IAU · 545571
545619 Lapuška	2011 SR_{47}	Kazimirs Lapuška (1936–2013) was a Latvian astronomer and a pioneering observer of artificial satellites in Latvia.	IAU · 545619
545651 Lilyjames	2011 SH_{119}	Lily Catherine James (b. 2002), the granddaughter of the discoverer.	IAU · 545651
545784 Kelemenjános	2011 UA_{57}	János Kelemen (born 1951), a Hungarian astronomer and discoverer of minor planets, comets and flare stars as well as an observer of Gamma-ray burst afterglows. He has made several of his discoveries at the Piszkéstető Station.	IAU · 545784
545839 Hernánletelier	2011 UC_{172}	Hernán Rivera Letelier (born 1950), a Chilean writer and novelist whose books have been translated into several languages.	IAU · 545839
545985 Galinaermolenko	2011 VW_{10}	Ermolenko Galina Vasilievna (1945–2023), author of educational space programs for school children.	IAU · 545985
