= List of stars in Canes Venatici =

This is the list of notable stars in the constellation Canes Venatici, sorted by decreasing brightness.

Name	B	F	Var	HD	HIP	RA	Dec	vis. mag.	abs. mag.	Dist. (ly)	Sp. class	Notes
Cor Caroli	α^{2}	12		112413	63125	12^{h} 56^{m} 01.84^{s}	+38° 19′ 05.7″	2.89	0.25	114	A0spe...	prototype α² CVn variable, V_{max} = 2.86^{m}, V_{min} = 2.93^{m}, P = 5.46939 d; binary star with α^{1} CVn
β CVn	β	8		109358	61317	12^{h} 33^{m} 45.09^{s}	+41° 21′ 24.4″	4.24	4.63	27	G0V	Chara, Asterion; solar analog; suspected variable, V_{max} = 4.24^{m}, V_{min} = 4.29^{m}
24 CVn		24		118232	66234	13^{h} 34^{m} 27.37^{s}	+49° 00′ 57.3″	4.68	0.85	190	A5V	suspected variable, V_{max} = 4.60^{m}, V_{min} = 4.70^{m}
20 CVn		20	AO	115604	64844	13^{h} 17^{m} 32.64^{s}	+40° 34′ 21.2″	4.72	0.00	286	F3III	δ Sct variable, V_{max} = 4.7^{m}, V_{min} = 4.75^{m}, P = 0.12168 d
AW CVn			AW	120933	67665	13^{h} 51^{m} 47.49^{s}	+34° 26′ 39.5″	4.76	−1.58	604	K5III	semiregular variable, V_{max} = 4.72^{m}, V_{min} = 4.81^{m}
5 CVn		5		107950	60485	12^{h} 24^{m} 01.48^{s}	+51° 33′ 44.0″	4.77	−0.64	393	G7III	Xiāng (相); suspected eclipsing binary, ΔV = 0.07^{m}
25 CVn		25		118623	66458	13^{h} 37^{m} 27.70^{s}	+36° 17′ 41.4″	4.82	0.97	192	A7III	Jordanus, binary star
HR 5110			BH	118216	66257	13^{h} 34^{m} 47.75^{s}	+37° 10′ 56.8″	4.91	1.67	145	F2IV SB	RS CVn variable, ΔV = 0.07^{m}, P = 2.61317 d
HD 115004				115004	64540	13^{h} 13^{m} 42.98^{s}	+40° 09′ 10.3″	4.94	−1.08	522	K0III	
6 CVn		6		108225	60646	12^{h} 25^{m} 51.00^{s}	+39° 01′ 07.3″	5.01	0.79	227	G8III-IV	variable star, ΔV = 0.006^{m}, P = 157.23270 d
21 CVn		21	BK	115735	64906	13^{h} 18^{m} 14.54^{s}	+49° 40′ 55.3″	5.13	0.51	275	A0V	α² CVn variable, ΔV = 0.04^{m}
14 CVn		14		113797	63901	13^{h} 05^{m} 44.46^{s}	+35° 47′ 55.9″	5.20	0.51	282	B9V	suspected variable, V_{max} = 5.10^{m}, V_{min} = 5.29^{m}
3 CVn		3		107274	60122	12^{h} 19^{m} 48.72^{s}	+48° 59′ 02.9″	5.28	−0.72	517	M0III	suspected variable
HD 109317				109317	61309	12^{h} 33^{m} 38.90^{s}	+33° 14′ 51.6″	5.42	0.86	266	K0IIICN...	
La Superba			Y	110914	62223	12^{h} 45^{m} 07.83^{s}	+45° 26′ 24.8″	5.42	−1.27	710	C7Iab	semiregular variable, V_{max} = 4.86^{m}, V_{min} = 5.88^{m}, P = 267.8 d
HD 120164				120164	67250	13^{h} 46^{m} 59.87^{s}	+38° 32′ 33.9″	5.51	0.67	304	K0III+...	
23 CVn		23		116010	65072	13^{h} 20^{m} 19.00^{s}	+40° 09′ 02.0″	5.60	−0.91	655	K1III	
α^{1} CVn	α^{1}	12		112412	63121	12^{h} 56^{m} 00.60^{s}	+38° 18′ 52.9″	5.61	2.78	120.2	F0V	component of the Cor Caroli system
HD 120420				120420	67384	13^{h} 48^{m} 38.74^{s}	+31° 11′ 24.4″	5.61	0.71	311	K0III	
HD 113847				113847	63916	13^{h} 05^{m} 52.28^{s}	+45° 16′ 06.6″	5.64	−0.21	483	K1III	suspected variable, V_{max} = 5.64^{m}, V_{min} = 5.84^{m}
2 CVn		2		106690	59831	12^{h} 16^{m} 07.54^{s}	+40° 39′ 36.9″	5.69	−1.35	834	M1III	
TU CVn			TU	112264	63024	12^{h} 54^{m} 56.54^{s}	+47° 11′ 48.3″	5.75	−0.92	704	M5III	semiregular variable, V_{max} = 5.50^{m}, V_{min} = 6.2^{m}, P = 44.2 d
19 CVn		19		115271	64692	13^{h} 15^{m} 32.05^{s}	+40° 51′ 18.6″	5.77	1.39	245	A7V	
HD 115723				115723	64927	13^{h} 18^{m} 27.71^{s}	+34° 05′ 53.9″	5.81	−0.14	504	K4.5III	
HD 111604			DT	111604	62641	12^{h} 50^{m} 10.81^{s}	+37° 31′ 00.8″	5.87	0.50	387	A3V	δ Sct variable
HD 116957				116957	65550	13^{h} 26^{m} 16.58^{s}	+46° 01′ 41.2″	5.88	0.68	357	K0III:	
HD 120047				120047	67194	13^{h} 46^{m} 13.63^{s}	+41° 05′ 19.9″	5.88	2.33	167	A5V	
HD 120819				120819	67605	13^{h} 51^{m} 09.21^{s}	+34° 39′ 52.3″	5.89	−0.69	676	M2III	variable star, ΔV = 0.010^{m}, P = 7.94786 d
17 CVn		17		114447	64246	13^{h} 10^{m} 03.27^{s}	+38° 29′ 55.9″	5.91	1.95	202	A9III-IV	γ Dor variable, ΔV = 0.008^{m}, P = 0.69004 d
HD 121164				121164	67782	13^{h} 53^{m} 10.36^{s}	+28° 38′ 53.0″	5.91	1.86	211	A7V	
HD 120048				120048	67210	13^{h} 46^{m} 19.10^{s}	+38° 30′ 13.2″	5.92	0.46	403	G9III	
10 CVn		10		110897	62207	12^{h} 44^{m} 59.68^{s}	+39° 16′ 42.9″	5.95	4.75	57	G0V	
HD 119458				119458	66907	13^{h} 42^{m} 43.42^{s}	+34° 59′ 20.4″	5.98	0.11	486	G5III	
HD 114357				114357	64212	13^{h} 09^{m} 38.72^{s}	+37° 25′ 23.3″	6.01	1.20	299	K3III	
HD 115810				115810	64979	13^{h} 19^{m} 04.27^{s}	+35° 07′ 40.6″	6.01	1.94	213	F0IV	
4 CVn		4	AI	107904	60467	12^{h} 23^{m} 47.08^{s}	+42° 32′ 33.8″	6.03	0.98	334	F3IV	δ Sct variable, V_{max} = 5.89^{m}, V_{min} = 6.15^{m}, P = 0.2085 d
HD 117710				117710	65951	13^{h} 31^{m} 15.84^{s}	+42° 06′ 21.9″	6.07	1.53	263	K2III	
CL CVn			CL	116581	65376	13^{h} 23^{m} 53.92^{s}	+37° 02′ 02.2″	6.10	−1.74	1207	M3III	slow irregular variable, ΔV = ~0.10^{m}
HD 112570				112570	63211	12^{h} 57^{m} 07.80^{s}	+46° 10′ 36.9″	6.12	0.99	344	K0III-IV	suspected variable, V_{max} = 6.12^{m}, V_{min} = 6.5^{m}
7 CVn		7		108845	60988	12^{h} 30^{m} 03.10^{s}	+51° 32′ 08.1″	6.21	2.94	147	F7V	
HD 119035				119035	66690	13^{h} 40^{m} 15.63^{s}	+31° 00′ 42.5″	6.21	0.12	540	G5II:	
HD 119081				119081	66725	13^{h} 40^{m} 39.12^{s}	+28° 03′ 54.5″	6.22	0.88	382	K3III	
HD 109345				109345	61320	12^{h} 33^{m} 47.41^{s}	+33° 23′ 04.9″	6.24	0.94	374	K0III	
11 CVn		11		111421	62516	12^{h} 48^{m} 41.86^{s}	+48° 28′ 00.5″	6.25	0.49	463	A6m	
HD 112171				112171	62972	12^{h} 54^{m} 13.15^{s}	+33° 32′ 03.9″	6.25	1.89	243	A7IV	
15 CVn		15		114376	64217	13^{h} 09^{m} 42.04^{s}	+38° 32′ 01.9″	6.25	−1.48	1144	B7III	
HD 122675				122675	68567	14^{h} 02^{m} 12.17^{s}	+45° 45′ 13.1″	6.28	0.17	544	K2III	
HD 119445				119445	66892	13^{h} 42^{m} 28.87^{s}	+41° 40′ 27.3″	6.30	−1.00	942	G6III	
HD 121682				121682	68065	13^{h} 56^{m} 10.54^{s}	+32° 01′ 56.9″	6.31	2.01	236	F4IV-V	
HD 107610				107610	60305	12^{h} 21^{m} 56.30^{s}	+47° 10′ 56.1″	6.33	1.46	307	K2III	
HD 110834				110834	62172	12^{h} 44^{m} 27.12^{s}	+44° 06′ 10.8″	6.34	1.54	298	F6IV	
HD 116303				116303	65230	13^{h} 22^{m} 03.97^{s}	+43° 54′ 12.0″	6.34	0.60	458	A7m	suspected variable, V_{max} = 6.34^{m}, V_{min} = 6.37^{m}
9 CVn		9		109980	61692	12^{h} 38^{m} 46.30^{s}	+40° 52′ 28.9″	6.35	2.27	213	A7Vn	suspected variable
HD 118156				118156	66223	13^{h} 34^{m} 21.85^{s}	+38° 47′ 21.2″	6.37	2.20	223	F0IV	
HD 110066			AX	110066	61748	12^{h} 39^{m} 16.85^{s}	+35° 57′ 07.1″	6.39	0.44	505	A0p SrCrEu	α² CVn variable, V_{max} = 6.32^{m}, V_{min} = 6.55^{m}, P = 4900 d
HD 117361				117361	65754	13^{h} 28^{m} 45.80^{s}	+50° 43′ 07.5″	6.42	1.97	253	F0IV	
HD 120600				120600	67483	13^{h} 49^{m} 44.98^{s}	+36° 37′ 58.0″	6.43	2.37	212	A7IV-V	
HD 121197				121197	67778	13^{h} 53^{m} 08.44^{s}	+40° 20′ 16.8″	6.48	−1.64	1370	K5	
HD 117261				117261	65723	13^{h} 28^{m} 26.23^{s}	+40° 43′ 47.2″	6.49	0.88	432	G8III	
HD 111572				111572	62600	12^{h} 49^{m} 38.05^{s}	+48° 44′ 24.2″	6.50	0.58	497	K1III	suspected variable, V_{max} = 6.47^{m}, V_{min} = 6.53^{m}
HD 114975				114975	64530	13^{h} 13^{m} 35.94^{s}	+36° 53′ 15.3″	6.50	−1.58	1347	M0	
V CVn			V	115898	65006	13^{h} 19^{m} 27.77^{s}	+45° 31′ 37.7″	6.74	-2.46	2260	M6IIIa	semiregular variable, V_{max} = 6.52^{m}, V_{min} = 8.56^{m}, P = 191.89 d
HD 108100			DD	108100	60571	12^{h} 24^{m} 13.93^{s}	+42° 51′ 17.0″	7.15	2.58	267.4	F2V	γ Dor variable, ΔV = 0.04^{m}, P = 0.754307 d
BM CVn			BM	116204	65187	13^{h} 21^{m} 32.26^{s}	+38° 52′ 49.5″	7.21	1.94	368	K2III	RS CVn variable, ΔV = 0.06^{m}, P = 21.7 d
R CVn			R	120499	67410	13^{h} 48^{m} 57.20^{s}	+39° 32′ 34.0″	7.40	-2.51	3130	M6IIIe	Mira variable, V_{max} = 6.5^{m}, V_{min} = 12.9^{m}, P = 328.53 d
HD 109995				109995	61696	12^{h} 38^{m} 47.60^{s}	+39° 18′ 31.6″	7.64	0.46	891	A0p	horizontal-branch star
HD 115781			BL	115781	64956	13^{h} 18^{m} 51.94^{s}	+33° 26′ 19.3″	8.13	1.5	691	K1III	rotating ellipsoidal variable, ΔV = 0.24^{m}, P = 18.692 d
RS CVn			RS	114519	64293	13^{h} 10^{m} 36.91^{s}	+35° 56′ 05.6″	8.23	3.06	352	F4V+...	prototype RS CVn variable, V_{max} = 7.93^{m}, V_{min} = 9.14^{m}, P = 4.797887 d
TT CVn			TT	112869	63389	12^{h} 59^{m} 22.64^{s}	+37° 49′ 03.7″	8.91			Rp...	semiregular variable
HD 115444				115444	64786	13^{h} 16^{m} 42.46^{s}	+36° 22′ 52.7″	8.97	1.72	918	G9V	barium star
TX CVn			TX			12^{h} 44^{m} 22.07^{s}	+36° 45′ 50.7″	9.34			B1-B9Veq + K0III-M4	Z And and rotating ellipsoidal variable, V_{max} = 9.34^{m}, V_{min} = 10.28^{m}, P = 199.75 d
VZ CVn			VZ	117777	66017	13^{h} 32^{m} 03.39^{s}	+28° 35′ 04.9″	9.35	1.1	1460	F3V + F6V	Algol and γ Dor variable, V_{max} = 9.17^{m}, V_{min} = 9.72^{m}, P = 0.84246163 d
HIP 65407					65407	13^{h} 24^{m} 21.0^{s}	+48° 53′ 06″	9.42	8.29	55	K0	has two planets (b & c)
Gliese 521					66625	13^{h} 39^{m} 24.10^{s}	+46° 11′ 11.4″	10.26	9.69	42.41	M2.0V	possibly has a planet
BI CVn			BI		63701	13^{h} 03^{m} 16.41^{s}	+36° 37′ 00.6″	10.31	3.41	782	F9V	W UMa variable, V_{max} = 10.26^{m}, V_{min} = 10.71^{m}, P = 0.38416 d
W CVn			W		68908	14^{h} 06^{m} 27.98^{s}	+37° 49′ 41.5″	10.49	-0.39	4900	F2III	RR Lyr variable, V_{max} = 10.03^{m}, V_{min} = 10.96^{m}, P = 0.5517588 d
Gliese 490			BF		63253	12^{h} 57^{m} 40.26^{s}	+35° 13′ 30.0″	10.52	9.1	62.78	M0.0V	binary star; BY Dra variable and flare star, V_{max} = 10.5^{m}, V_{min} = 10.6^{m}, P = 3.17 d
ST CVn			ST		68188	13^{h} 57^{m} 34.06^{s}	+29° 51′ 28.7″	11.21			A1	RR Lyr variable, V_{max} = 11.04^{m}, V_{min} = 11.6^{m}, P = 0.329045 d
UZ CVn			UZ		61029	12^{h} 30^{m} 27.70^{s}	+40° 30′ 32.0″	12.11	4.76	964	A8	RR Lyr variable
Z CVn			Z			12^{h} 49^{m} 45.37^{s}	+43° 46′ 25.1″	12.12			A5	RR Lyr variable, V_{max} = 11.46^{m}, V_{min} = 12.36^{m}, P = 0.653819 d
DG CVn			DG			13^{h} 31^{m} 46.62^{s}	+29° 16′ 36.7″	12.19	12.69	25.9	M4.0V	flare star and BY Dra variable
HAT-P-36						12^{h} 33^{m} 03^{s}	+44° 54′ 55″	12.26	4.75	1034		Tuiren; has a transiting planet (Bran)
UX CVn			UX			12^{h} 14^{m} 48.54^{s}	+36° 38′ 49.3″				B2	rotating ellipsoidal variable and eclipsing binary
HAT-P-12						13^{h} 57^{m} 33.48^{s}	+43° 29′ 36.7″	12.84			K5	has a transiting planet
AM CVn			AM			12^{h} 34^{m} 54.60^{s}	+37° 37′ 44.1″	14.18	9.15	330	DBp	prototype AM CVn star
GD 154			BG			13^{h} 09^{m} 57.69^{s}	+35° 09′ 47.1″	15.33			DA4.4	ZZ Cet variable, ΔV = 0.09^{m}, P = 0.013727 d
Table legend: • Name = Proper name • B = Bayer designation • F or/and G. = Flamsteed designation or Gould designation • Var = Variable-star designation • HD = Henry Draper Catalogue designation number • HIP = Hipparcos Catalogue designation number • RA = Right ascension for the Epoch/Equinox J2000.0 • Dec = Declination for the Epoch/Equinox J2000.0 • vis. mag. = visual magnitude (m or m_{v}), also known as apparent magnitude • abs. mag. = absolute magnitude (M_{v}) • Dist. (ly) = Distance in light-years from Earth • Sp. class = Spectral class of the star in the stellar classification system • Notes = Common name(s) or alternate name(s); comments; notable properties [for example: multiple star status, range of variability if it is a variable star, exoplanets, etc.]

== See also ==
- List of stars by constellation
