= Canes Venatici in Chinese astronomy =

According to traditional Chinese uranography, the modern constellation Canes Venatici is located in Three Enclosures (三垣, Sān Yuán)

The name of the western constellation in modern Chinese is 獵犬座 (liè quǎn zuò), meaning "the hound constellation".

== Stars ==
Enclosures	Enclosure (Chinese name)	Romanization	Translation	Asterisms (Chinese name)	Romanization	Translation	Western star name	Proper Name	Chinese star name	Romanization	Translation
Three Enclosures (三垣)	紫微垣	Zǐ Wēi Yuán	Purple Forbidden enclosure	三公	Sāngōng	Three Excellencies					
Three Enclosures (三垣)	紫微垣	Zǐ Wēi Yuán	Purple Forbidden enclosure	三公	Sāngōng	Three Excellencies	M51		三公一	Sāngōngyī	1st star
Three Enclosures (三垣)	紫微垣	Zǐ Wēi Yuán	Purple Forbidden enclosure	三公	Sāngōng	Three Excellencies	24 CVn		三公二	Sāngōngèr	2nd star
Three Enclosures (三垣)	紫微垣	Zǐ Wēi Yuán	Purple Forbidden enclosure	三公	Sāngōng	Three Excellencies	21 CVn		三公三	Sāngōngsān	3rd star
Three Enclosures (三垣)	紫微垣	Zǐ Wēi Yuán	Purple Forbidden enclosure	相	Xiāng	Prime Minister					
Three Enclosures (三垣)	紫微垣	Zǐ Wēi Yuán	Purple Forbidden enclosure	相	Xiāng	Prime Minister	5 CVn		相	Xiāng	(One star of)
Three Enclosures (三垣)	紫微垣	Zǐ Wēi Yuán	Purple Forbidden enclosure	相	Xiāng	Prime Minister	3 CVn		相增二	Xiāngzēngèr	2nd additional star
Three Enclosures (三垣)	紫微垣	Zǐ Wēi Yuán	Purple Forbidden enclosure	相	Xiāng	Prime Minister	11 CVn		相增三	Xiāngzēngsān	3rd additional star
Three Enclosures (三垣)	太微垣	Tài Wēi Yuán	Supreme Palace enclosure	常陳	Chángchén	Imperial Guards					
Three Enclosures (三垣)	太微垣	Tài Wēi Yuán	Supreme Palace enclosure	常陳	Chángchén	Imperial Guards	α^{1} CVn and α^{2} CVn	Cor Caroli (for α^{2} CVn)	常陳一	Chángchényī	1st star
Three Enclosures (三垣)	太微垣	Tài Wēi Yuán	Supreme Palace enclosure	常陳	Chángchén	Imperial Guards	10 CVn		常陳二	Chángchénèr	2nd star
Three Enclosures (三垣)	太微垣	Tài Wēi Yuán	Supreme Palace enclosure	常陳	Chángchén	Imperial Guards	9 CVn		常陳三	Chángchénsān	3rd star
Three Enclosures (三垣)	太微垣	Tài Wēi Yuán	Supreme Palace enclosure	常陳	Chángchén	Imperial Guards	β CVn	Chara	常陳四	Chángchénsì	4th star
Three Enclosures (三垣)	太微垣	Tài Wēi Yuán	Supreme Palace enclosure	常陳	Chángchén	Imperial Guards	6 CVn		常陳五	Chángchénwu	5th star
Three Enclosures (三垣)	太微垣	Tài Wēi Yuán	Supreme Palace enclosure	常陳	Chángchén	Imperial Guards	2 CVn		常陳六	Chángchénliù	6th star
Three Enclosures (三垣)	太微垣	Tài Wēi Yuán	Supreme Palace enclosure	常陳	Chángchén	Imperial Guards	4 CVn		常陳增一	Chángchénzēngyī	1st additional star
Three Enclosures (三垣)	太微垣	Tài Wēi Yuán	Supreme Palace enclosure	常陳	Chángchén	Imperial Guards	18 CVn		常陳增二	Chángchénzēngèr	2nd additional star
Three Enclosures (三垣)	太微垣	Tài Wēi Yuán	Supreme Palace enclosure	常陳	Chángchén	Imperial Guards	20 CVn		常陳增三	Chángchénzēngsān	3rd additional star
Three Enclosures (三垣)	太微垣	Tài Wēi Yuán	Supreme Palace enclosure	常陳	Chángchén	Imperial Guards	16 CVn		常陳增四	Chángchénzēngsì	4th additional star
Three Enclosures (三垣)	太微垣	Tài Wēi Yuán	Supreme Palace enclosure	常陳	Chángchén	Imperial Guards	15 CVn		常陳增五	Chángchénzēngwǔ	5th additional star
Three Enclosures (三垣)	太微垣	Tài Wēi Yuán	Supreme Palace enclosure	常陳	Chángchén	Imperial Guards	17 CVn		常陳增六	Chángchénzēngliù	6th additional star
Three Enclosures (三垣)	太微垣	Tài Wēi Yuán	Supreme Palace enclosure	常陳	Chángchén	Imperial Guards	HD 114357		常陳增五	Chángchénzēngwǔ	5th additional star

== See also ==
- Traditional Chinese star names
- Chinese constellations
