= Beta Comae Berenices =

Star in the constellation Coma Berenices

- β Comae Berenices (circled) in the constellation Coma Berenices

Observation data Epoch J2000 Equinox ICRS
- Constellation: Coma Berenices
- Right ascension: 13^{h} 11^{m} 52.39383^{s}
- Declination: +27° 52′ 41.4623″
- Apparent magnitude (V): 4.26

Characteristics
- Evolutionary stage: main sequence
- Spectral type: G0 V
- U−B color index: +0.08
- B−V color index: +0.58

Astrometry
Radial velocity (R_{v})	+5.30±0.13 km/s
Proper motion (μ)	RA: -800.720 mas/yr Dec.: +882.301 mas/yr
Parallax (π)	108.7250±0.1645 mas
Distance	30.00 ± 0.05 ly (9.20 ± 0.01 pc)
Absolute magnitude (M_{V})	4.46

Details
Mass	1.15 M_{☉}
Radius	1.079±0.022 R_{☉}
Luminosity	1.39±0.06 L_{☉}
Habitable zone inner limit	0.918 au
Habitable zone outer limit	1.96 au
Surface gravity (log g)	4.47±0.05 cgs
Temperature	6,038±23 K
Metallicity [Fe/H]	+0.07 dex
Rotation	12.3±1.1 days
Rotational velocity (v sin i)	4.10 ± 0.06 km/s
Age	1.5–2.5 Gyr

Other designations
- β Com, 43 Com, BD+28°2193, FK5 492, GJ 502, HD 114710, HIP 64394, HR 4983, SAO 82706, LHS 348, LTT 13815

Database references
SIMBAD	data

Beta Comae Berenices is a solar-type star in the northern constellation of Coma Berenices. Its name is a Bayer designation that is Latinized from β Comae Berenices. Based on parallax measurements, it is located at a distance of 30.0 light-years (9.2 parsecs) from Earth. The Greek letter beta (β) usually indicates that the star has the second highest visual magnitude in the constellation. However, with an apparent visual magnitude of 4.3, this star is actually slightly brighter than α Comae Berenices. It can be seen with the naked eye, but may be too dim to be viewed from a built-up urban area.

== Nomenclature ==
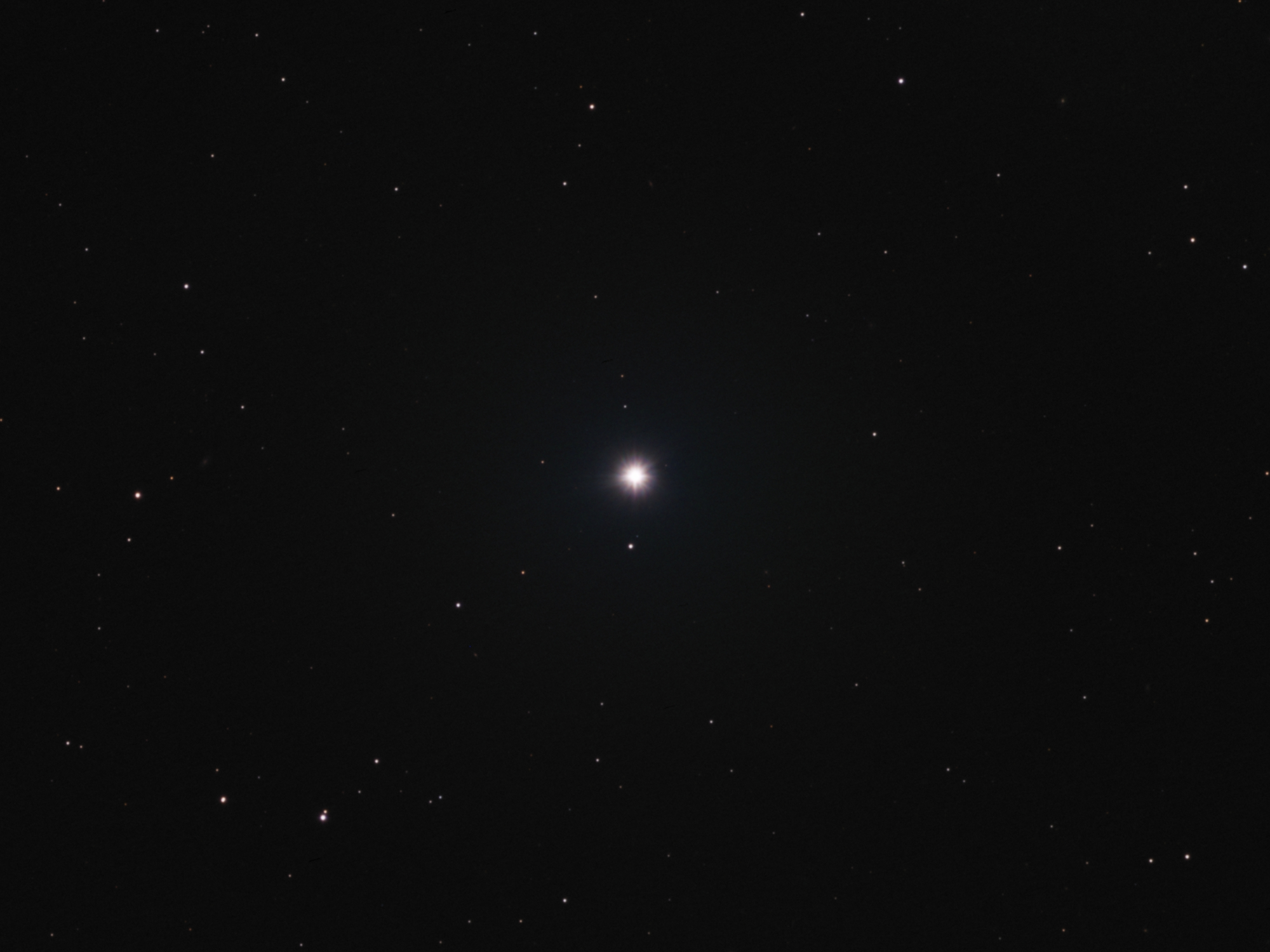
β Comae Berenices in optical light (field of view about half a degree)

β Comae Berenices (Latinised to Beta Comae Berenices) is the star's Bayer designation, which is abbreviated Beta Com or β Com. The designation was assigned by Francis Baily in 1845. It also has the Flamsteed designation 43 Comae Berenices.

In Chinese astronomy, this star, 37 Com and 41 Com form the asterism Zhōudǐng (周鼎), representing a three-legged bronze food vessel. The Chinese name for β Com itself is Zhōudǐngyī (周鼎一), the first star of Zhōudǐng. In R. H. Allen's Star Names, this name was transliterated as Chow Ting, but the constellation's "lucida" (brightest star, i.e. β Com) was said to be Hing Chin.

== Characteristics ==
The star has a stellar classification of G0 V, compared to G2 V for the Sun. It has a mass of 1.15 solar masses and a radius of 1.079 solar radii. The effective temperature of the outer envelope is 6,038 K, giving it a yellow hue of a G-type star. In terms of age it is younger than the Sun, being about 2 billion years old.

Observations of short term variations in the chromatic activity suggest that the star undergoes differential rotation, with a rotation period of about 11–13 days. Its surface has a measured activity cycle of 16.6 years, compared to 11 years on the Sun. It may also have a secondary activity cycle of 9.6 years. At one time it was thought that this star might have a spectroscopic companion. However, this was ruled out by means of more accurate radial velocity measurements. No planets have yet been detected around it, and there is no evidence of a dusty disk.

The habitable zone for this star, defined as the locations where liquid water could be present on an Earth-like planet, is 0.918–1.96 AU, where 1 AU is the average distance from the Earth to the Sun.

== See also ==
- List of star systems within 25–30 light-years
- Beta Canum Venaticorum, a nearby similar star.
