= Beta Canum Venaticorum =

Star in constellation Canes Venatici

β Canum Venaticorum
- Location of β Canum Venaticorum (circled)

Observation data Epoch J2000 Equinox ICRS
- Constellation: Canes Venatici
- Right ascension: 12^{h} 33^{m} 44.54425^{s}
- Declination: +41° 21′ 26.9214″
- Apparent magnitude (V): 4.25±0.05

Characteristics
- Evolutionary stage: Main sequence
- Spectral type: G0 V
- U−B color index: 0.05
- B−V color index: 0.59

Astrometry
Radial velocity (R_{v})	+6.15±0.12 km/s
Proper motion (μ)	RA: −704.702 mas/yr Dec.: +292.155 mas/yr
Parallax (π)	118.0266±0.1530 mas
Distance	27.63 ± 0.04 ly (8.47 ± 0.01 pc)
Absolute magnitude (M_{V})	4.64

Details
Mass	0.91+0.05 −0.07 M_{☉}
Radius	1.02±0.02 R_{☉}
Luminosity	1.254±0.009 L_{☉}
Surface gravity (log g)	4.41±0.04 cgs
Temperature	5,867 (Note: This is the weighted average of five effective temperature values spectroscopically derived with different spectral analysis codes. The paper notes that effective temperature values derived using spectroscopy or photometry generally agree with each other, while values derived using interferometry are more scattered and can be inconsistent.) K
Metallicity [Fe/H]	−0.20±0.01 dex
Rotational velocity (v sin i)	2.9±0.4 km/s
Age	3.4 to 7.1 Gyr

Other designations
- Chara, β CVn, 8 CVn, BD+42 2321, FK5 470, GJ 475, HD 109358, HIP 61317, HR 4785, SAO 44230, NGC 4530

Database references
SIMBAD	data
ARICNS	data

Beta Canum Venaticorum, proper name Chara (/ˈkɛərə/), is the second-brightest star in the northern constellation of Canes Venatici. It is a single nearby solar analog, located 27.6 light-years (8.47 parsecs) from the Sun based on its parallax. The star is faintly visible to the naked eye, at an apparent magnitude of +4.25. Along with the brighter star Cor Caroli, the pair form the "southern dog" in this constellation that represents hunting dogs.

== Nomenclature ==
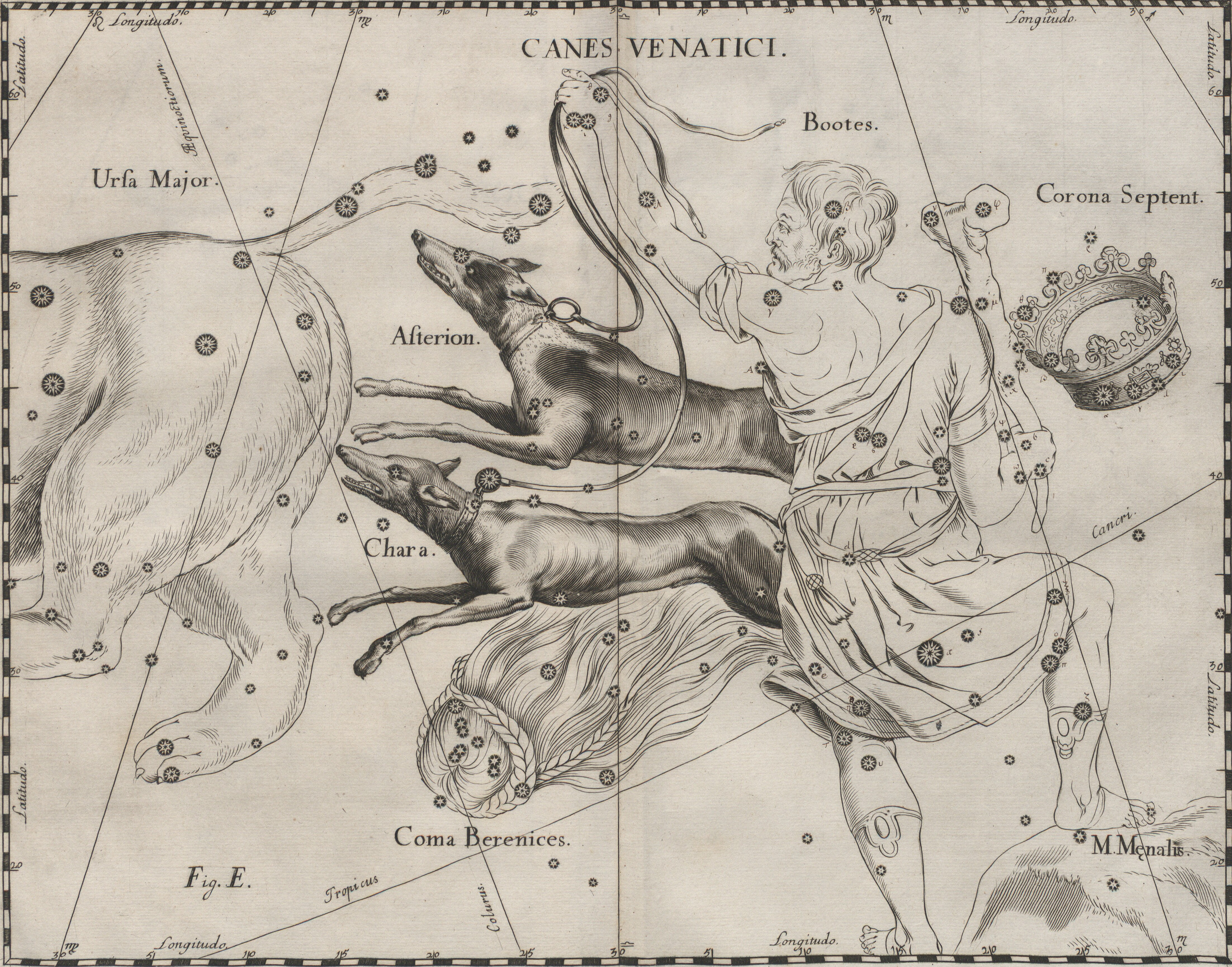
The first use of the name Chara for the southern dog of Canes Venatici, depicted by Johannes Hevelius (1690). β CVn is the star on the dog's eye.

β Canum Venaticorum (Latinised to Beta Canum Venaticorum) is the star's Bayer designation, abbreviated Beta CVn or β CVn. It has the Flamsteed designation 8 Canum Venaticorum. The star was listed in the New General Catalogue as NGC 4530.

The proper name Chara, pronounced /kʰaˈra/, was originally applied to the "southern dog", but it later became used specifically to refer to Beta Canum Venaticorum. Chara (χαρά) means 'joy' in Greek but ‍'dear' ‍or ‍'beloved' in Latin. In 2016, the International Astronomical Union organized a Working Group on Star Names (WGSN) to catalog and standardize proper names for stars. The WGSN's first bulletin of July 2016 included a table of the first two batches of names approved by the WGSN, which included Chara for this star.

Historically, some sources, such as Antonín Bečvář's mid-20th century star atlas, have assigned the name Asterion (originally the northern dog) to β Canum Venaticorum, with Chara instead being assigned to Cor Caroli.

In Chinese astronomy, 常陳 (Cháng Chén), meaning Imperial Guards, refers to an asterism consisting of Beta Canum Venaticorum, Alpha Canum Venaticorum, 10 Canum Venaticorum, 6 Canum Venaticorum, 2 Canum Venaticorum, and 67 Ursae Majoris. Consequently, the Chinese name for Beta Canum Venaticorum itself is 常陳四 (Cháng Chén sì, English: the Fourth Star of Imperial Guards).

== Characteristics ==
Beta CVn has a stellar classification of G0 V, and so is a G-type main-sequence star. Since 1943, the spectrum of this star has served as one of the stable anchor points by which other stars are classified. It also displays no radial velocity variation down to the order of metres per second. As such, it has been used as a radial velocity standard star to verify the stability of radial velocity spectrometers.

Chara is very similar to the Sun, having similar mass as the Sun, a radius of 1.02 solar radii, an effective temperature of around 5870 K, and shines at around 1.2 solar luminosities. As a result, it has been considered a solar twin. It is slightly metal-poor, which means it has a somewhat lower portion of elements heavier than helium when compared to the Sun.

=== Magnetic activity ===
Chara exhibits weak chromospheric activity, reflected in its very weak emission line of singly ionized calcium (Ca II). This makes its spectrum useful as a reference for comparing with other stars in a similar spectral category. However, a number of stars have been found to have even weaker chromospheric emissions. Its mean S-index, a chromospheric activity index derived from Ca II emission, is around 0.165, whereas the Sun's is 0.1621±0.0008. This indicates that their chromospheric activity levels are similar. The chromospheric activity cycles with a period of 13.50 years.

Observation data from ROSAT indicates that the star's X-ray luminosity is 1.9×10^{27} erg·s^{–1} (1.9×10^{20} W), making up 0.00004% of its total luminosity, comparable to the Sun's 0.00006%.

=== Past claims of binarity ===
A research work analysing Chara's radial velocity published in 1976 proposed that it was a single-lined spectroscopic binary with a period of 2430 days. The companion was allegedly detected with speckle interferometric observations. However, other attempts to detect it failed, and it is possible that telescope artifacts were responsible for its detection. The RV detection claim was refuted by a 1987 reanalysis of the same RV data, finding no evidence of radial velocity variation.

A 2005 direct imaging search for a brown dwarf in orbit around this star failed to discover any such companion down to the instrument's sensitivity limit. As of 2026, Chara has no known stellar companions.

=== Kinematics ===
As it is relatively close to the Solar System, Chara has a high proper motion, moving -0.705 arcseconds per year in right ascension (the celestial equivalent of longitude) and 0.292 arcseconds per year in declination (celestial latitude), for a combined total of 0.604 arcseconds per year. (Note: The total proper motion μ can be computed from: μ^{2} = (μ_{α} cos δ)^{2} + μ_{δ}^{2} where μ_{α} is the proper motion in right ascension, μ_{δ} is the proper motion in declination, and δ is the declination. This yields: μ^{2} = (-704.702 · cos(41.357°))^{2} + 292.155^{2} = 365143.2 or μ equals 604.271.) The star's radial velocity is +6.268±0.0004 km/s (away from the Sun). The components of its galactocentric space velocity relative to the Sun are (U, V, W) = (-31.97, -3.83, 1.28) km/s. It is travelling within the Milky Way at a mean galactocentric distance of 26.50 kilolight-years (8.124 kiloparsecs) from the core along an orbit that has an eccentricity of 0.067.

== Search for planets ==
A 2020 analysis of Chara's radial velocity data found no evidence of planets more massive than Saturn orbiting within 10 au. Smaller planets, such as Earth-massed planets orbiting within the star's habitable zone, remain undetectable with available data.

This star does not display excess infrared emission, suggesting it is not surrounded by a dense debris disc.

== Habitability ==
Chara has attracted significant astrobiological interest, owing to its proximity and similarities to the Sun. In 2006, astronomer Margaret Turnbull labeled it as the top stellar system candidate to search for extraterrestrial life forms, and it is incorporated into the list of the most astrobiologically interesting stars within 10 parsecs of the Sun. It is also included in the NASA Exoplanet Exploration Program (ExEP) Mission Star List (EMSL), where it is considered one of the best candidates for future searches for biosignatures.

== See also ==
- List of star systems within 25–30 light-years
- List of nearest G-type stars
- Beta Comae Berenices, a nearby similar star.
