= Cor Caroli =

Binary star in the constellation of Canes Venatici

α Canum Venaticorum
- The location of α Canum Venaticorum (circled)

Observation data Epoch J2000.0 Equinox ICRS
- Constellation: Canes Venatici
- α^{2} CVn
- Right ascension: 12^{h} 56^{m} 01.66622^{s}
- Declination: +38° 19′ 06.1541″
- Apparent magnitude (V): 2.84 to 2.98
- α^{1} CVn
- Right ascension: 12^{h} 56^{m} 00.43258^{s}
- Declination: +38° 18′ 53.3768″
- Apparent magnitude (V): 5.60

Characteristics

α^{2} CVn
- Evolutionary stage: main sequence
- Spectral type: A0pSiEuHg
- U−B color index: −0.32
- B−V color index: −0.12
- Variable type: α^{2} CVn

α^{1} CVn
- Evolutionary stage: main sequence
- Spectral type: F2V
- U−B color index: −0.03
- B−V color index: +0.34

Astrometry

α^{2} CVn
| Radial velocity (R_{v}) | −4.1±0.2 km/s |
| Proper motion (μ) | RA: −235.08 mas/yr Dec.: 53.54 mas/yr |
| Parallax (π) | 32.7227±0.5844 mas |
| Distance | 100 ± 2 ly (30.6 ± 0.5 pc) |
| Absolute magnitude (M_{V}) | 0.16±0.08 |

α^{1} CVn
| Radial velocity (R_{v}) | −0.60 ± 0.9 km/s |
| Proper motion (μ) | RA: −232.86 mas/yr Dec.: 55.69 mas/yr |
| Parallax (π) | 30.6121±0.0666 mas |
| Distance | 106.5 ± 0.2 ly (32.67 ± 0.07 pc) |

Details

α^{2} CVn
| Mass | 2.97±0.07 M_{☉} |
| Radius | 2.49±0.26 R_{☉} |
| Luminosity | 101±12 L_{☉} |
| Surface gravity (log g) | 3.9±0.1 cgs |
| Temperature | 11,600±500 K |
| Rotation | 5.46939 d |
| Rotational velocity (v sin i) | 18.4±0.5 km/s |
| Age | 165+60 −70 Myr |

α^{1} CVn
| Mass | 1.47±0.15 M_{☉} |
| Radius | 1.5 R_{☉} |
| Luminosity | 7.1 L_{☉} |
| Surface gravity (log g) | 4.25±0.22 cgs |
| Temperature | 7,080 K |
| Rotational velocity (v sin i) | 18 km/s |

Other designations
- α CVn, Alpha CVn, 12 CVn, BD+39°2580, ADS 8706 AB, CCDM J12560+3819B
- α^{2} CVn: FK5 485, GC 17557, HD 112413, HIP 63125, HR 4915, SAO 63257
- α^{1} CVn: GC 17556, HD 112412, HIP 63121, HR 4914, SAO 63256

Database references
| SIMBAD | α^{2} CVn |
- α^{1} CVn

Cor Caroli /ˌkɔːr ˈkærəlaɪ/ is a binary star in the northern constellation of Canes Venatici. It is the brightest star in the constellation, lying at the third magnitude. The International Astronomical Union uses the name "Cor Caroli" specifically for the brighter star of the binary. The system has the Bayer designation Alpha Canum Venaticorum or α Canum Venaticorum.

== Nomenclature ==
α Canum Venaticorum, Latinised to Alpha Canum Venaticorum, is the system's Bayer designation. The brighter of the two stars is designated α^{2} Canum Venaticorum, the fainter α^{1} Canum Venaticorum.

In the western world Alpha Canum Venaticorum had no name until the 17th century, when it was named Cor Caroli, which means "Charles's Heart". There has been some uncertainty whether it was named in honour of King Charles I of England, who was executed in 1649 during the English Civil War, or of his son, Charles II, who restored the English monarchy to the throne in 1660. The name was coined in 1660 by Sir Charles Scarborough, physician to Charles II, who claimed the star seemed to shine exceptionally brightly on the night of Charles II's return to England. In Star Names, R.H. Allen claimed that Scarborough suggested the name to Edmond Halley and intended it to refer to Charles II. However, Robert Burnham Jr. notes that "the attribution of the name to Halley appears in a report published by J. E. Bode at Berlin in 1801, but seems to have no other verification". In Star Tales, Ian Ridpath points out that the name's first appearance on a star map was in the 1673 chart of Francis Lamb, who labelled it Cor Caroli Regis Martyris ('the heart of Charles the martyred king'), clearly indicating that it was seen as referring to Charles I.

In 2016, the International Astronomical Union organized a Working Group on Star Names (WGSN) to catalog and standardize proper names for stars. The WGSN's first bulletin of July 2016 included a table of the first two batches of names approved by the WGSN, which included Cor Caroli for the star α^{2} Canum Venaticorum.

In Chinese, 常陳 (Cháng Chén), meaning Imperial Guards, refers to an asterism consisting of α Canum Venaticorum, 10 Canum Venaticorum, Beta Canum Venaticorum, 6 Canum Venaticorum, 2 Canum Venaticorum and 67 Ursae Majoris. Consequently, the Chinese name for Alpha Canum Venaticorum itself is 常陳一 (Cháng Chén yī, English: the First Star of Imperial Guards). From this Chinese name, the name Chang Chen was derived.

== Stellar properties ==
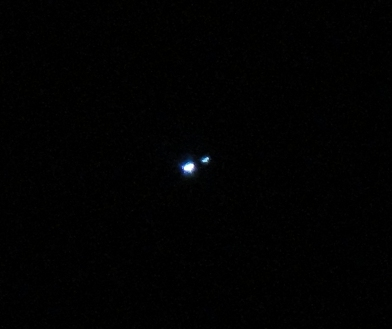
Cor Caroli seen from northern England on March 1, 2011

Alpha Canum Venaticorum is a binary pair of stars that marks the northern vertex of the asterism known as the Great Diamond or the Diamond of Virgo. The system lies approximately 110 light-years from the Sun.

The two stars are separated by an estimated 650 - 670 Astronomical Units, and orbit a common center of mass with a period around 8,000 years. The pair have a combined apparent magnitude of 2.81. The two stars are 19.6 arcseconds apart in the sky and are easily resolved in small telescopes.

=== α^{2} Canum Venaticorum ===
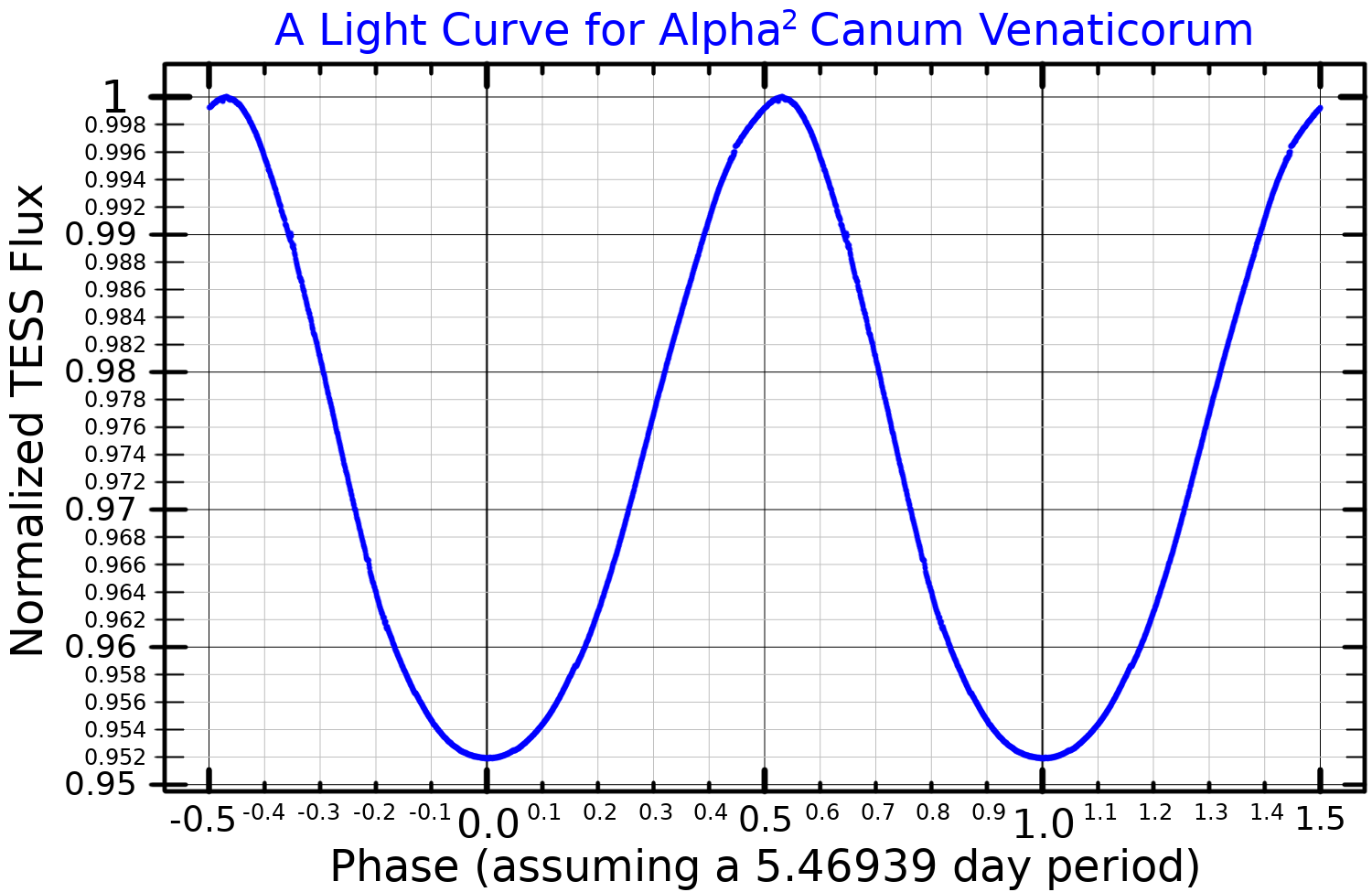
A light curve for α^{2} Canum Venaticorum, plotted from TESS data

α^{2} Canum Venaticorum has a spectral type of A0, and has an apparent visual magnitude which varies between 2.84 and 2.98, with a period of 5.47 days. It is a chemically peculiar star with a strong magnetic field, about 5,000 times as strong as the Earth's, and is also classified as an Ap/Bp star. Its atmosphere has overabundances of some elements, such as silicon, mercury and europium. This is thought to be due to some elements sinking down into the star under the force of gravity while others are elevated by radiation pressure. This star is the prototype of a class of variable stars, the so-called α^{2} Canum Venaticorum variables. The strong magnetic field of these stars is believed to produce starspots of enormous extent. Due to these starspots the brightness of α^{2} Canum Venaticorum stars varies considerably during their rotation.

=== α^{1} Canum Venaticorum ===
α^{1} Canum Venaticorum is an F-type main-sequence star. It is considerably fainter than its companion and has an apparent visual magnitude of approximately 5.60.

== Namesakes ==
Cor Caroli was a U.S. Navy Crater-class cargo ship named after the star.
