= AW Canum Venaticorum =

Star in constellation Canes Venatici

- Location of AW Canum Venaticorum (circled in red)

Observation data Epoch J2000 Equinox J2000
- Constellation: Canes Venatici
- Right ascension: 13^{h} 51^{m} 47.47504^{s}
- Declination: +34° 26′ 39.2474″
- Apparent magnitude (V): 4.73 – 4.85

Characteristics
- Spectral type: M3- IIIa
- B−V color index: 1.611±0.006
- Variable type: Lb

Astrometry
Radial velocity (R_{v})	−44.21±0.25 km/s
Proper motion (μ)	RA: −20.477 mas/yr Dec.: −31.626 mas/yr
Parallax (π)	5.2734±0.2529 mas
Distance	620 ± 30 ly (190 ± 9 pc)
Absolute magnitude (M_{V})	−1.56

Details
Mass	2.18±0.16 M_{☉}
Radius	117.41+4.25 −4.57 R_{☉}
Luminosity	2,387±213 L_{☉}
Surface gravity (log g)	0.98±0.30 cgs
Temperature	3,529±25 K
Metallicity [Fe/H]	−0.09±0.11 dex
Age	1.11±0.21 Gyr

Other designations
- AW CVn, AAVSO 1347+34, BD+35°2496, FK5 3102, HD 120933, HIP 67665, HR 5219, SAO 63793

Database references
SIMBAD	data

AW Canum Venaticorum is a variable star in the constellation Canes Venatici. It is visible to the naked eye with a nominal apparent visual magnitude of about 4.8. The distance to this star, as measured from its annual parallax shift of 5.3 mas, is around 620 light years. It is moving closer with a heliocentric radial velocity of −44 km/s.

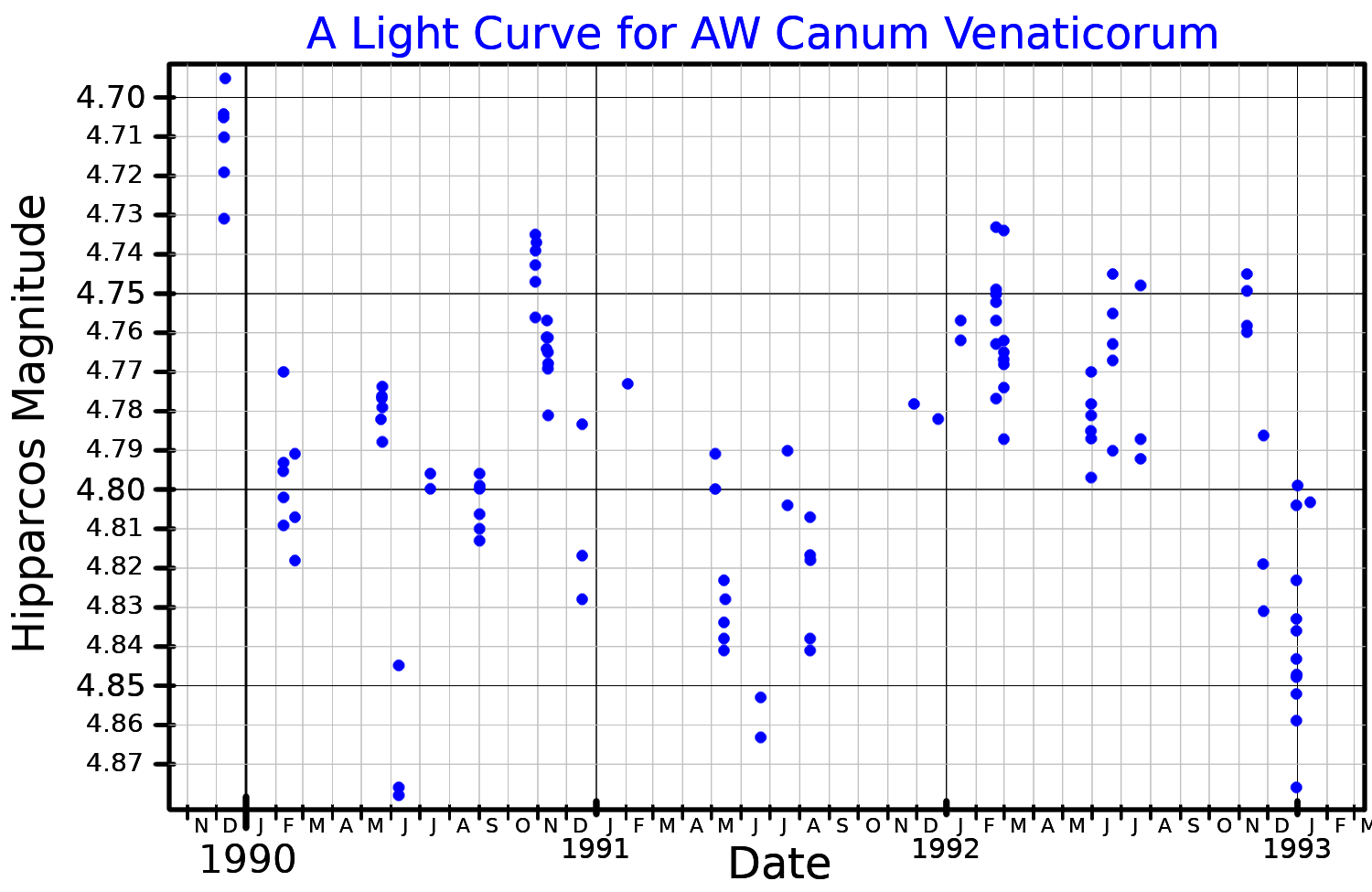
A light curve for AW Canum Venaticorum, plotted from Hipparcos data

The variability of the brightness of HR 5219 was announced by Joel Stebbins and Charles Morse Huffer in 1928, based on observations made at Washburn Observatory. It was given its variable star designation, AW Canum Venaticorum, in 1977.

At the age of 1.1 billion years, this is an evolved red giant star with a stellar classification of M3- IIIa. It is a slow irregular variable of type Lb, with a brightness that ranges between magnitudes 4.73 and 4.85. The star has 2.2 times the mass of the Sun and has expanded to 117 times the Sun's radius. It is radiating 2,387 times the Sun's luminosity from its enlarged photosphere at an effective temperature of 3,529 K.
