= 37 Comae Berenices =

Triple-star system in the constellation Coma Berenices

- Location of 37 Comae Berenices (circled in red)

Observation data Epoch J2000.0 Equinox ICRS
- Constellation: Coma Berenices
- Right ascension: 13^{h} 00^{m} 16.46725^{s}
- Declination: +30° 47′ 06.0644″
- Apparent magnitude (V): 4.88

Characteristics
- Evolutionary stage: subgiant
- Spectral type: G9 III CH-2 CN-1
- B−V color index: 1.165±0.014
- Variable type: RS CVn

Astrometry
Radial velocity (R_{v})	−14.34 km/s
Proper motion (μ)	RA: −18.662 mas/yr Dec.: −5.802 mas/yr
Parallax (π)	4.6981±0.2586 mas
Distance	690 ± 40 ly (210 ± 10 pc)
Absolute magnitude (M_{V})	−1.62

Details
Mass	5.25 M_{☉}
Radius	38.2 R_{☉}
Luminosity (bolometric)	590 L_{☉}
Surface gravity (log g)	2.3 cgs
Temperature	4,625 K
Metallicity [Fe/H]	−0.05 dex
Rotation	111 days
Rotational velocity (v sin i)	11±1 km/s

Other designations
- 37 Com, 13 CVn, LU Com, BD+31°2434, HD 112989, HIP 63462, HR 4929, SAO 96265

Database references
SIMBAD	data

37 Comae Berenices is a variable star system located around 690 light years away from the Sun in the northern constellation of Coma Berenices. It has the variable star designation LU Comae Berenices. 37 Comae Berenices was a later Flamsteed designation of 13 Canum Venaticorum. This object is visible to the naked eye as a faint, yellow-hued star with a baseline apparent visual magnitude of 4.88. It is drifting closer to the Earth with a heliocentric radial velocity of −14 km/s.

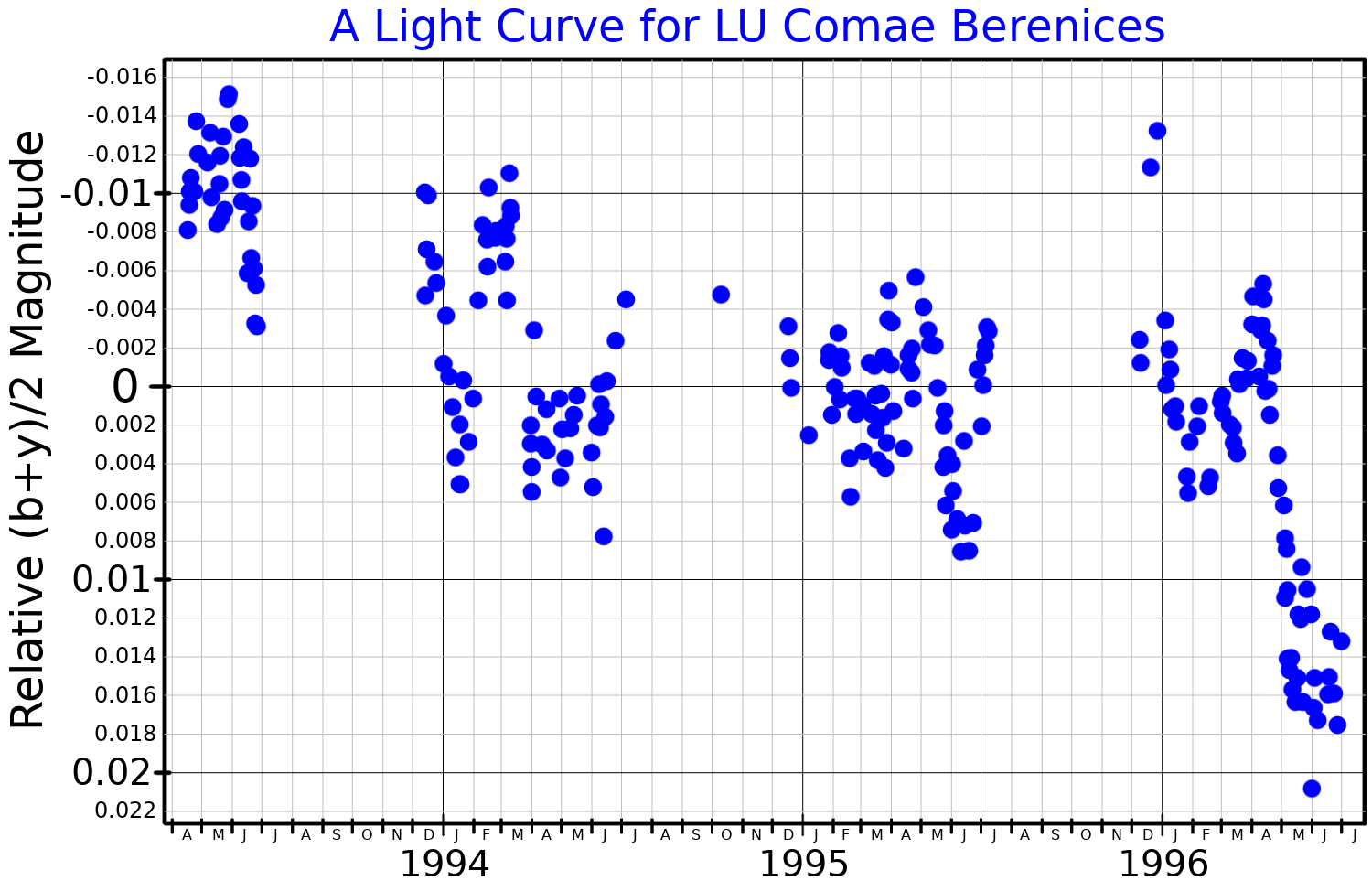
A light curve for LU Comae Berenices, adapted from Henry et al. (2000). The plotted brightness is the average of the Strömgren b and y magnitudes.

Tokovinin (2008) catalogued this as a wide triple star system. The primary component is an aging giant star, currently in the Hertzsprung gap, with a stellar classification of G9 III CH-2 CN-1. It is a weak G-band star, a luminous giant star with a carbon abundance about a factor of 5 lower than is typical for such stars. José Renan De Medeiros et al. announced that the star is a variable star, in 1999. It was given its variable star designation in 2003. This is a variable star most likely of the RS CVn type with an amplitude of 0.15 in magnitude, and it displays magnetic activity. It has 5.25 times the mass of the Sun and, having exhausted the supply of hydrogen at its core, has expanded to 38 times the Sun's radius.
