= 41 Comae Berenices =

Star in the constellation Coma Berenices

- Location of 41 Comae Berenices (circled in red)

Observation data Epoch J2000 Equinox ICRS
- Constellation: Coma Berenices
- Right ascension: 13^{h} 07^{m} 10.72992^{s}
- Declination: +27° 37′ 29.0554″
- Apparent magnitude (V): 4.80±0.02

Characteristics
- Evolutionary stage: red giant branch
- Spectral type: K5-III
- B−V color index: 1.482±0.003

Astrometry
Radial velocity (R_{v})	−15.89±0.13 km/s
Proper motion (μ)	RA: +34.155 mas/yr Dec.: −69.539 mas/yr
Parallax (π)	8.5989±0.1327 mas
Distance	379 ± 6 ly (116 ± 2 pc)
Absolute magnitude (M_{V})	−0.04

Details
Mass	1.21±0.19 M_{☉}
Radius	33.75±0.77 R_{☉}
Luminosity	323.0±21.7 L_{☉}
Surface gravity (log g)	1.70 cgs
Temperature	4,211±54 K
Metallicity [Fe/H]	−0.09 dex
Rotational velocity (v sin i)	1.8 km/s
Age	4.51±1.84 Gyr

Other designations
- 36 Com, BD+28°2185, FK5 3045, HD 113996, HIP 64022, HR 4954, SAO 82659

Database references
SIMBAD	data
Exoplanet Archive	data

41 Comae Berenices is a single, orange-hued star in the northern constellation of Coma Berenices. It is visible to the naked eye, having an apparent visual magnitude of 4.80. Based upon an annual parallax shift of 8.6 mas, it is located around 379 light years away. It is moving closer to the Earth with a heliocentric radial velocity of −16 km/s.

At the age of about 4.5 billion years, this is an evolved giant star with a stellar classification of K5-III, currently on the red giant branch. It has 1.2 times the mass of the Sun and, after consuming the hydrogen at its core, has expanded to 34 times the Sun's radius. The star is radiating 323 times the Sun's luminosity from its enlarged photosphere at an effective temperature of 4,211 K.

In 2017, one planet (HD 113996 b) was found orbiting it via the radial velocity method. The planet has a mass of at least 6.3±1.0 M_{J}, a semi-major axis of 1.6±0.1 AU, an orbital period of 610.2±3.8 d, and an eccentricity of 0.28±0.12.

The 41 Comae Berenices planetary system
Companion (in order from star)	Mass	Semimajor axis (AU)	Orbital period (days)	Eccentricity	Inclination (°)	Radius
b	≥6.3±1.0 M_{J}	1.6±0.1	610.2±3.8	0.28±0.12	—	—
