= 19 Canum Venaticorum =

Binary star system in the constellation Canes Venatici

Observation data Epoch J2000 Equinox ICRS
- Constellation: Canes Venatici
- Right ascension: 13^{h} 15^{m} 31.95263^{s}
- Declination: +40° 51′ 18.7516″
- Apparent magnitude (V): 5.77 (5.87 + 9.48)

Characteristics
- Evolutionary stage: main sequence
- Spectral type: A7 V
- B−V color index: 0.198±0.004

Astrometry
Radial velocity (R_{v})	−21.1±2.6 km/s
Proper motion (μ)	RA: −113.761 mas/yr Dec.: +19.858 mas/yr
Parallax (π)	13.7210±0.1581 mas
Distance	238 ± 3 ly (72.9 ± 0.8 pc)
Absolute magnitude (M_{V})	1.42

Orbit
Period (P)	219.2 yr
Semi-major axis (a)	0.745″
Eccentricity (e)	0.686
Inclination (i)	44.5°
Longitude of the node (Ω)	22.2°
Periastron epoch (T)	2201.7
Argument of periastron (ω) (secondary)	273.3°

Details

19 CVn A
Mass	2.06±0.03 M_{☉}
Radius	2.5 R_{☉}
Luminosity	25.5+1.9 −1.8 L_{☉}
Surface gravity (log g)	4.09±0.14 cgs
Temperature	8,048±274 K
Rotational velocity (v sin i)	110 km/s
Age	366 Myr

Other designations
- 19 CVn, BD+41°2374, FK5 461, HD 115271, HIP 64692, HR 5004, SAO 44531, WDS J13155+4051

Database references
SIMBAD	data

19 Canum Venaticorum is a binary star system in the northern constellation of Canes Venatici, located approximately 238 light years from Sun based on its parallax. It is dimly visible to the naked eye as a white-hued star with an apparent visual magnitude of 5.77. The pair orbit each other with a period of 219.2 years and an eccentricity of 0.686. The system is moving closer to the Earth with a heliocentric radial velocity of −21 km/s.

The magnitude +5.87 primary, component A, is an A-type main-sequence star with a stellar classification of A7 V. It is 366 million years old with twice the mass of the Sun and 2.5 times the Sun's radius. The star is radiating 25.5 times the Sun's luminosity from its photosphere at an effective temperature of 8,048 K. It has a high rate of spin, showing a projected rotational velocity of 110 km/s. As of 2012, its companion, designated component B, is a magnitude 9.48 star located 0.60 arcseconds from the primary along a position angle of 58°.
