= USS Cor Caroli =

Cargo ship of the United States Navy

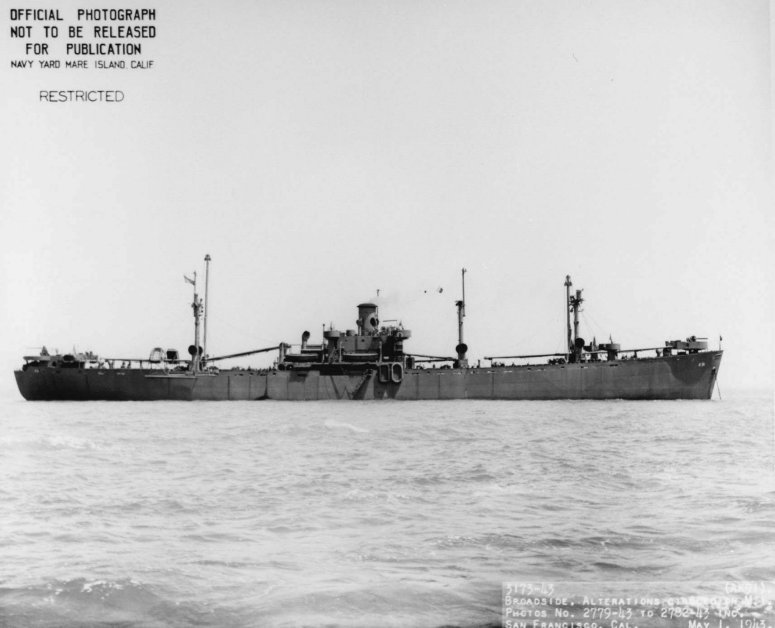
- USS Cor Caroli (AK-91), broadside view, underway off San Francisco, 1 May 1943.

History

United States
- Name: Betsy Ross; Cor Caroli
- Namesake: Betsy Ross; The star Cor Caroli
- Ordered: as a Type EC2-S-C1 hull, MCE hull 476
- Builder: Permanente Metals Corporation, Richmond, California
- Cost: $1,061,271
- Yard number: 476
- Way number: 5
- Laid down: 20 February 1943
- Launched: 19 March 1943
- Sponsored by: Mrs. B.F. Hodglin
- Acquired: 31 March 1943
- Commissioned: 16 April 1943
- Decommissioned: 30 November 1945
- Stricken: 19 December 1945
- Identification: Hull symbol: AK-91; IMO number: 5043423; Code letters: NKGG
- Honors and awards: 1 × battle star
- Fate: Returned to MARCOM, laid up in the National Defense Reserve Fleet, James River Group, Lee Hall, Virginia, 2 December 1945; Transferred to the state of South Carolina, 26 May 1975, reefed, 16 mi (26 km) off Hilton Head, South Carolina

General characteristics
- Class & type: Crater-class cargo ship
- Displacement: 4,023 long tons (4,088 t) (standard); 14,550 long tons (14,780 t) (full load)
- Length: 441 ft 6 in (134.57 m)
- Beam: 56 ft 11 in (17.35 m)
- Draft: 28 ft 4 in (8.64 m)
- Installed power: 2 × Oil fired 450 °F (232 °C) boilers, operating at 220 psi (1,500 kPa) , (manufactured by Babcock & Wilcox); 2,500 shp (1,900 kW)
- Propulsion: 1 × Vertical triple-expansion reciprocating steam engine, (manufactured by Joshua Hendy); 1 × screw propeller
- Speed: 12.5 kn (23.2 km/h; 14.4 mph)
- Capacity: 7,800 t (7,700 long tons) DWT; 444,206 cu ft (12,578.5 m^{3}) (non-refrigerated)
- Complement: 206
- Armament: 1 × 5 in (127 mm)/38 caliber dual-purpose (DP) gun; 1 × 3 in (76 mm)/50 caliber DP gun; 2 × 40 mm (1.57 in) Bofors anti-aircraft (AA) gun mounts; 6 × 20 mm (0.79 in) Oerlikon cannon AA gun mounts

USS Cor Caroli (AK-91) was a Crater-class cargo ship commissioned by the US Navy for service in World War II and crewed by the US Coast Guard. She was named after Cor Caroli, the brightest star in constellation Canes Venatici. She was responsible for delivering goods and equipment to locations in the war zone.

== Construction ==
Cor Caroli was launched 19 March 1943 as SS Betsy Ross, MCE hull 476, by Permanente Metals Corporation, Yard No. 2, Richmond, California, under a Maritime Commission (MARCOM) contract; sponsored by Mrs. B.F. Hodglin; acquired by the Navy 31 March 1943; commissioned 16 April 1943 and reported to the Pacific Fleet.

== Service history ==
After coastwise cargo operations, Cor Caroli cleared San Diego, California, 14 June 1943, for Auckland, New Zealand, arriving 18 July. Until 23 January 1944, she operated between Auckland and Noumea, Espiritu Santo, Guadalcanal, Suva, Efate, and Tulagi, supporting the South Pacific Ocean operations. She sailed from Auckland 8 January 1944 for Nouméa, where she loaded additional cargo, and Lunga Point, arriving 28 January.

=== Shooting down a Japanese plane ===
She proceeded to Bougainville, where she joined in the invasion from 8 to 17 February, splashing a Japanese plane when air resistance developed. She returned to Bougainville with additional cargo from 6 to 11 March, and next operated off Emirau from 9 to 16 April in landings there. Cor Caroli continued to operate in the Solomons until 12 June, when she sailed for Eniwetok. After standing by in reserve during the invasion of Eniwetok, she sailed on with her cargo to Guam, where she participated in the assault from 27 July to 15 August.

=== Supporting Philippine invasion operations ===
Cor Caroli returned to the Southwest Pacific early in September 1944, and carried cargo among the bases there until 13 January 1945, when she arrived at Auckland to load new cargo, which she carried to Eniwetok and Guam. Returning to New Zealand for brief repairs, she sailed on to Pearl Harbor, arriving 8 June to load cargo for the Philippines. She ferried among Philippine ports between 13 July and 4 August, when she sailed for Guadalcanal, Espiritu Santo, Pearl Harbor, and San Pedro, California.

== Post-war decommissioning ==
After overhaul, she continued to Norfolk, Virginia, arriving 17 November. Here she was decommissioned 30 November 1945, and returned to the War Shipping Administration (WSA) on 2 December 1945. She entered the National Defense Reserve Fleet, James River Group, Lee Hall, Virginia, the same day. On 26 May 1978, she was released to the State of South Carolina to be used as an artificial reef off the coast of Hilton Head.

The wreck now lies at:32°03′16.31″N 80°24′58.21″W

== Awards ==
Cor Caroli received one battle star for World War II service. It was for the Marianas operation, capture and occupation of Guam, 27 July to 15 August 1944. Her crew was eligible for the following medals:

- American Campaign Medal
- Asiatic–Pacific Campaign Medal (1)
- World War II Victory Medal
- Philippines Liberation Medal

== Bibliography ==
- "Cor Caroli". Dictionary of American Naval Fighting Ships. Naval History and Heritage Command. This article incorporates text from this source, which is in the public domain.
- "Kaiser Permanente No. 2, Richmond CA". ShipbuildingHistory.com. 13 October 2010.
- "USS Cor Caroli (AK-91)". NavSource. 26 September 2015.
- "BETSY ROSS (AK-91)". United States Department of Transportation. Archived from the original on 12 December 2019.
- Seamus (12 November 2015). "Betsy Ross Reef". Fishing Status.com.
- "SS Betsy Ross".
