= HR 5110 =

Star in constellation Canes Venatici

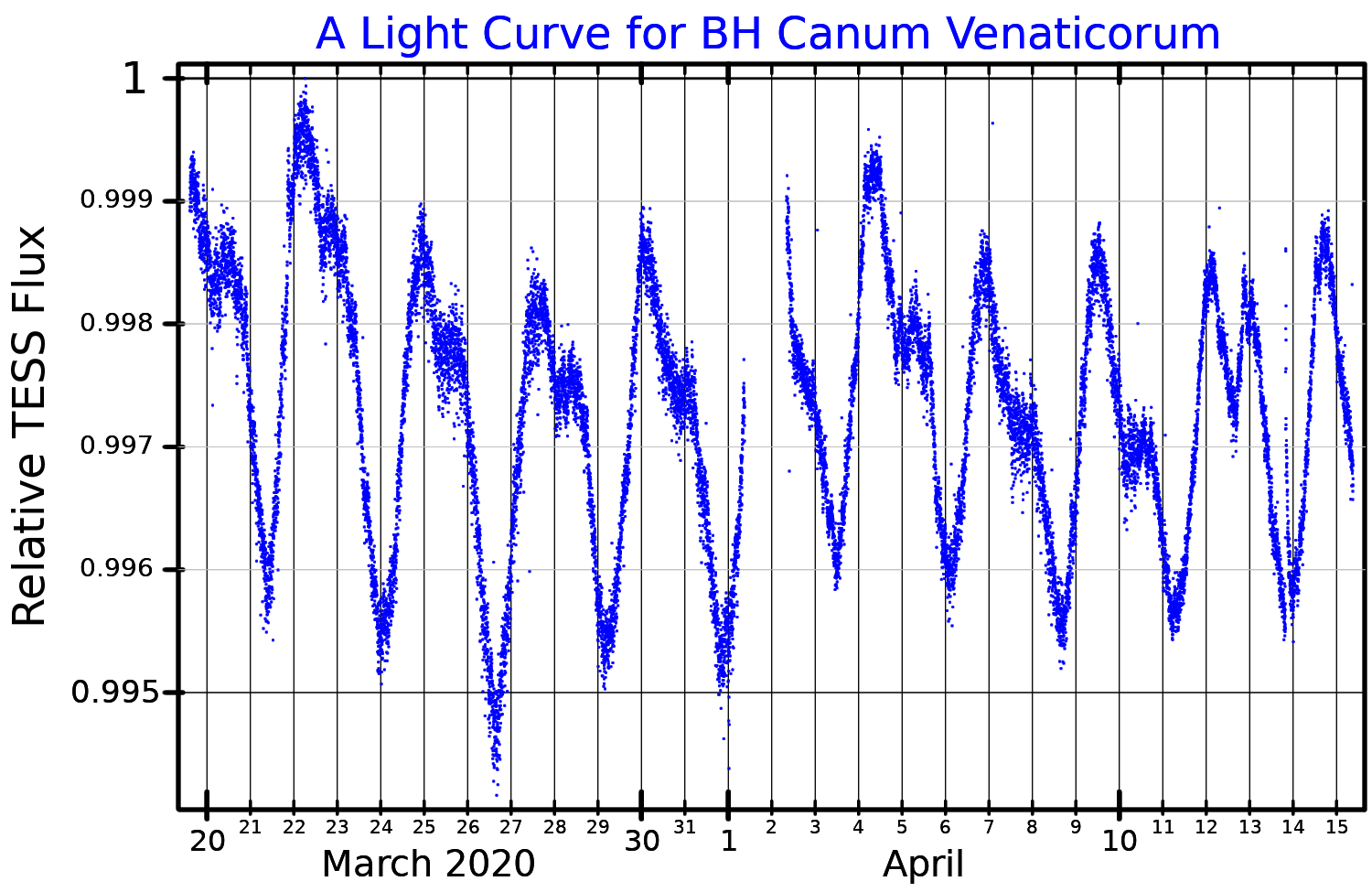
- A light curve for BH Canum Venaticorum, plotted from TESS data

Observation data Epoch J2000 Equinox ICRS
- Constellation: Canes Venatici
- Right ascension: 13^{h} 34^{m} 47.80827^{s}
- Declination: +37° 10′ 56.6979″
- Apparent magnitude (V): 4.91

Characteristics
- Spectral type: kA6hF1mF2 (F2 IV + K0 IV)
- B−V color index: 0.404±0.010
- Variable type: RS CVn

Astrometry
Radial velocity (R_{v})	6.43±0.24 km/s
Proper motion (μ)	RA: +84.63 mas/yr Dec.: −9.34 mas/yr
Parallax (π)	21.90±0.23 mas
Distance	149 ± 2 ly (45.7 ± 0.5 pc)
Absolute magnitude (M_{V})	1.61

Orbit
Period (P)	2.613214 d
Semi-major axis (a)	0.017 AU
Eccentricity (e)	0.00
Inclination (i)	171.1°
Longitude of the node (Ω)	89±10°
Periastron epoch (T)	2,445,766.655

Details

BH CVn A
Mass	1.5 M_{☉}
Radius	2.6 R_{☉}
Luminosity	19.01 L_{☉}
Surface gravity (log g)	3.61±0.14 cgs
Temperature	6,569±223 K
Metallicity [Fe/H]	−0.20 dex
Age	1.36 Gyr

BH CVn B
Mass	0.8 M_{☉}
Radius	3.4 R_{☉}

Other designations
- BH CVn, BD+37°2426, FK5 502, HD 118216, HIP 66257, HR 5110, SAO 63623

Database references
SIMBAD	data

HR 5110, also known as BH Canum Venaticorum, is a binary star system in the northern constellation of Canes Venatici. It is visible to the naked eye with an apparent visual magnitude of 4.91. Based upon an annual parallax shift of 21.90±0.23 mas, it is located 149 light-years away. The system is moving further from the Sun with a heliocentric radial velocity of 6.4 km/s.

This is a close binary system with an orbital period of 2.6 days and an orbital plane that is oriented nearly face-on. It may be considered an Algol-type semidetached binary. The hotter primary component has a stellar classification of F2 IV, indicating it is an evolving subgiant star that is leaving the main sequence after consuming the hydrogen at its core.

Douglas S. Hall et al. discovered that HR 5110 is a variable star, in 1978. It was given its variable star designation, BH Canum Venaticorum, in 1981. HR 5110 is classified as a RS Canum Venaticorum variable system, primarily due to chromospheric activity in the secondary component. This star has a classification of K0 IV, matching a K-type subgiant star. Based upon the close separation of the pair and the class of the secondary component, that latter is probably filling its roche lobe. This star is most likely the source of the radio emission from this system, and the alignment of this signal is consistent with a polar starspot.
