= 4 Canum Venaticorum =

Binary star system in the constellation Canes Venatici

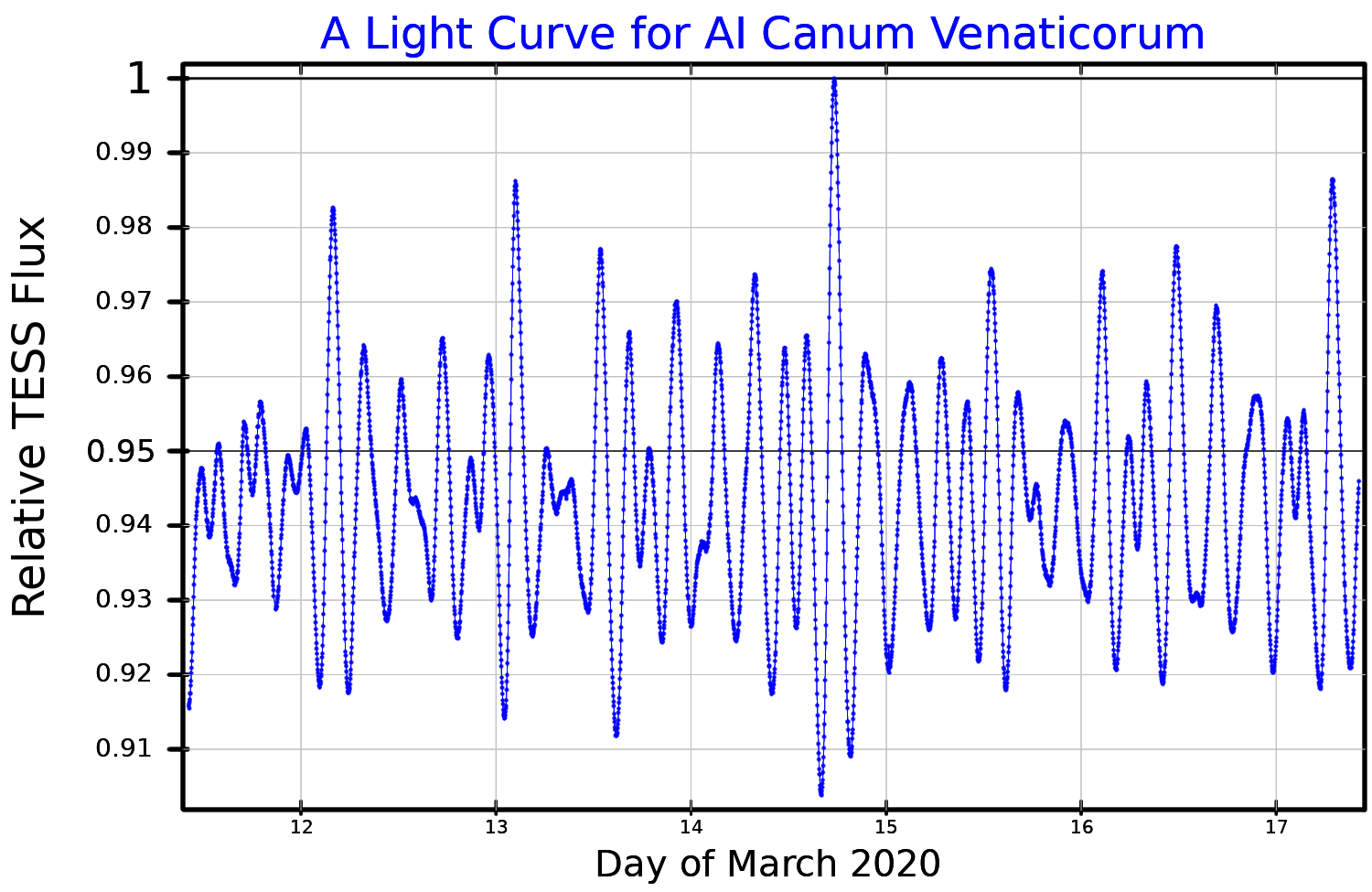
- A light curve for AI Canes Venaticorum, plotted from TESS data

Observation data Epoch J2000 Equinox J2000
- Constellation: Canes Venatici
- Right ascension: 12^{h} 23^{m} 47.01208^{s}
- Declination: +42° 32′ 33.8622″
- Apparent magnitude (V): +5.89 to 6.15

Characteristics
- Evolutionary stage: subgiant
- Spectral type: F3 IV or F0 III
- B−V color index: 0.366±0.005
- Variable type: δ Sct

Astrometry
| Radial velocity (R_{v}) | −0.3±2.9 km/s |
| Proper motion (μ) | RA: −80.044 mas/yr Dec.: +13.518 mas/yr |
| Parallax (π) | 7.6048±0.0855 mas |
| Distance | 429 ± 5 ly (131 ± 1 pc) |
| Absolute magnitude (M_{V}) | +0.75 |

Orbit
| Period (P) | 124.44±0.03 d |
| Eccentricity (e) | 0.311±0.003 |
| Periastron epoch (T) | 2454605±10.3 JD |
| Argument of periastron (ω) (secondary) | 70.2±0.7° |
| Semi-amplitude (K_{1}) (primary) | 13.24±0.05 km/s |

Details

4 CVn A
| Mass | 1.0–2.0 M_{☉} |
| Radius | 3.7–4.1 R_{☉} |
| Luminosity | 295+3.6 −3.2 L_{☉} |
| Surface gravity (log g) | 3.30±0.35 cgs |
| Temperature | 6,875±120 K |
| Metallicity [Fe/H] | −0.05±0.15 dex |
| Rotational velocity (v sin i) | 109±3 km/s |

Other designations
- 4 CVn, AI Canum Venaticorum, BD+43°2218, FK5 2993, GC 16899, HD 107904, HIP 60467, HR 4715, SAO 44155

Database references
| SIMBAD | data |

4 Canum Venaticorum is a binary star system in the northern constellation of Canes Venatici, located around 429 light-years away. It has the variable star designation AI Canum Venaticorum; 4 Canum Venaticorum is its Flamsteed designation. Its brightness varies from magnitude +5.89 to +6.15 with a period of 2.8 hours, which places it around the lower limit of visibility to the naked eye. This was found to be a binary by Schmid et al. in 2014, based on periodic, non-sinusoidal changes in its radial velocity. It is a single-lined spectroscopic binary with an orbital period of 124.4 days and an eccentricity of 0.31.

The primary component is an evolved F-type star with a stellar classification of F3 IV or F0 III, matching a subgiant or giant star, respectively. Roberta M. Humphreys first showed that the star's brightness varies, in 1966. It is a variable of the Delta Scuti class, displaying both radial and non-radial pulsations. The variable nature of this star was discovered by D. H. P. Jones and C. Margaret Haslam in 1966 at the suggestion of Olin J. Eggen, and it has become one of the best studied stars in its class. The radial pulsations have shown little if any variations between 1974 and 2012. However, the non-radial pulsations vary continuously in frequency over periods spanning decades. It is spinning rapidly with a rotation of at least one third of its critical velocity.
