= Nearby Stars Database =

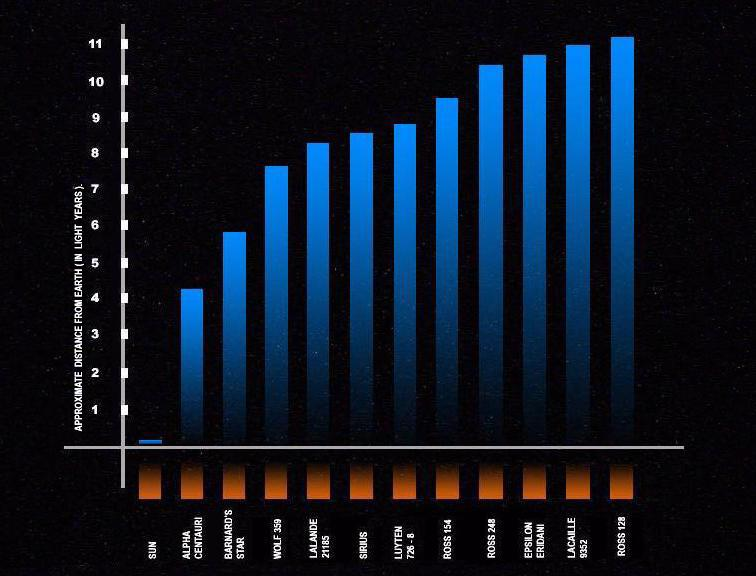
Nearest stars to Earth

The Nearby Stars Database (NStars) began as a NASA project in 1998, then was based at Northern Arizona University. It is now defunct. The stated mission of NStars was "to be a complete and accurate source of scientific data about all stellar systems within 25 parsecs." The website (see below) included search tools and links to an interactive forum.

== Status ==
As of 1 January 2002, there were 2,633 stars in 2,029 systems in the database. As of 29 January 2008, the site is closed, displaying the message "This site is currently undergoing a major redesign and will be returned to service at a later date."
