= 20 Canum Venaticorum =

Star in the constellation Canes Venatici

- Location of 20 Canum Venaticorum (circled in red)

Observation data Epoch J2000 Equinox J2000
- Constellation: Canes Venatici
- Right ascension: 13^{h} 17^{m} 32.54115^{s}
- Declination: +40° 34′ 21.3844″
- Apparent magnitude (V): +4.70 - 4.75

Characteristics
- Evolutionary stage: subgiant
- Spectral type: A9 II mF2
- B−V color index: 0.30
- Variable type: δ Sct

Astrometry
Radial velocity (R_{v})	9.32±0.16 km/s
Proper motion (μ)	RA: −125.614 mas/yr Dec.: +18.386 mas/yr
Parallax (π)	12.7783±0.1151 mas
Distance	255 ± 2 ly (78.3 ± 0.7 pc)
Absolute magnitude (M_{V})	+0.18

Details
Mass	2.43 M_{☉}
Radius	5.1 R_{☉}
Luminosity	63 L_{☉}
Surface gravity (log g)	2.97 cgs
Temperature	7,314±42 K
Metallicity [Fe/H]	0.18 dex
Rotational velocity (v sin i)	15 km/s
Age	750 Myr

Other designations
- 20 CVn, AO Canum Venaticorum, BD+41°2380, FK5 494, GC 18000, HD 115604, HIP 64844, HR 5017, SAO 44549

Database references
SIMBAD	data

20 Canum Venaticorum is a single variable star in the northern constellation of Canes Venatici, located 238 light years from the Sun. This object has the variable star designation AO Canum Venaticorum; 20 Canum Venaticorum is the Flamsteed designation. It is visible to the naked eye as a faint, white-hued star with an apparent visual magnitude around +4.7. The star is moving further from the Earth with a heliocentric radial velocity of +9 km/s. Eggen (1971) listed this star as a member of the Hyades Stream.

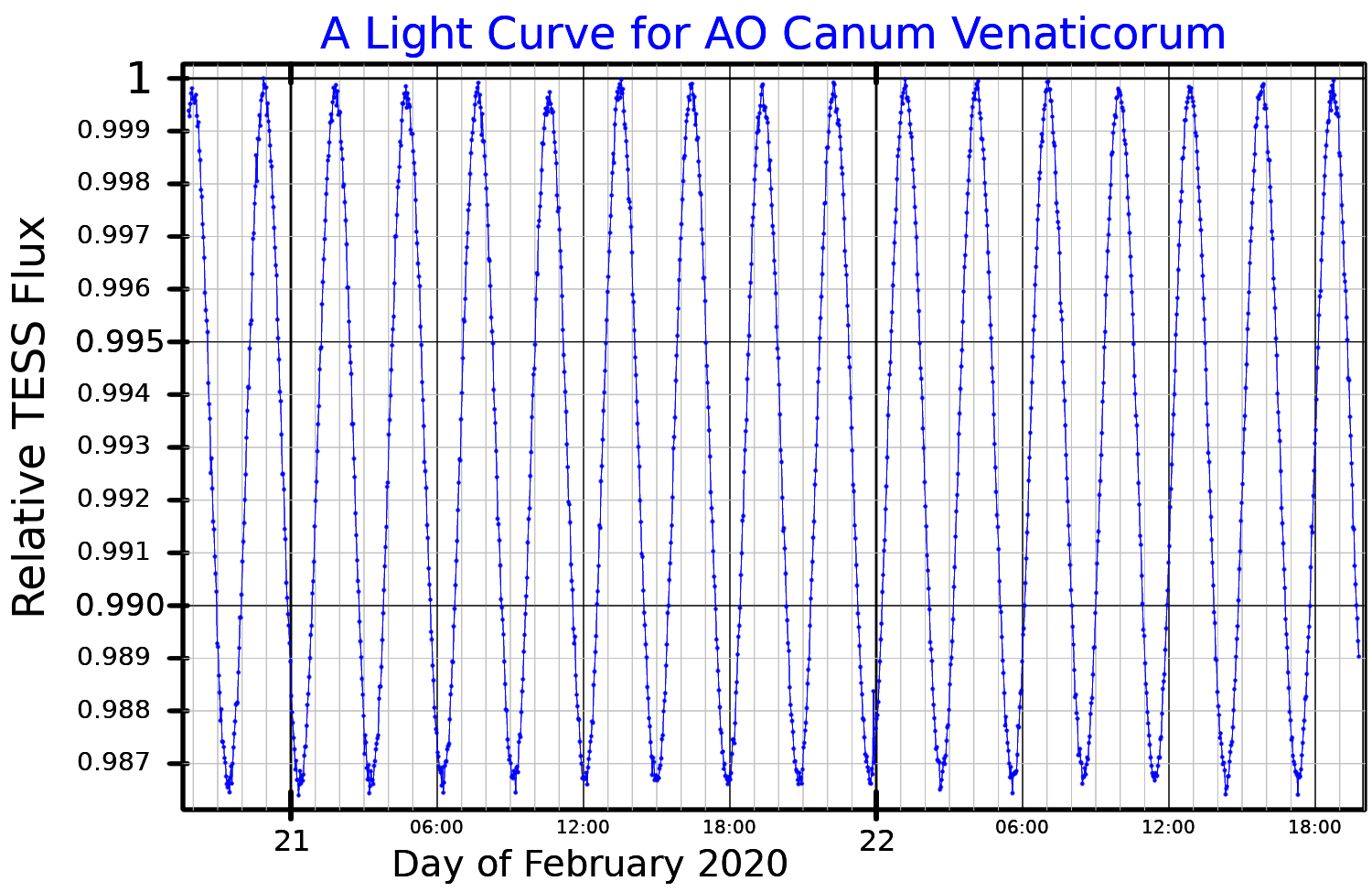
A light curve for AO Canum Venaticorum, plotted from TESS data

This star has a stellar classification of A9 II mF2, which indicates the hydrogen line matches an A-type bright giant but the metal lines are closer to an F-type star. However, it does not appear to be an Am star as the Calcium K line is normal. Earlier, Morgan and Abt (1972) assigned it a giant star class of F3 III. It has also been listed as a spectral standard for class F3 III.

William Henry Wehlau et al. announced that the star's brightness varies, in 1966. It is classified as a Delta Scuti variable with a single radial pulsation mode providing the best fit to the observed variation. Its brightness varies from magnitude +4.70 to +4.75 with a period of 2.92 hours.

20 Canum Venaticorum is 750 million years old with 2.43 times the mass of the Sun and five times the Sun's radius. It is radiating 63 times the Sun's luminosity from its photosphere at an effective temperature of 7,314 K.
