= 21 Canum Venaticorum =

Star in the constellation Canes Venatici

Observation data Epoch J2000 Equinox ICRS
- Constellation: Canes Venatici
- Right ascension: 13^{h} 18^{m} 14.50953^{s}
- Declination: +49° 40′ 55.4292″
- Apparent magnitude (V): +5.14

Characteristics
- Evolutionary stage: main sequence
- Spectral type: B9 IV (Si) or A0 V Si:
- B−V color index: −0.049±0.002
- Variable type: α^{2} CVn

Astrometry
Radial velocity (R_{v})	−2.9±2.8 km/s
Proper motion (μ)	RA: −35.161 mas/yr Dec.: +16.342 mas/yr
Parallax (π)	11.6974±0.0898 mas
Distance	279 ± 2 ly (85.5 ± 0.7 pc)
Absolute magnitude (M_{V})	0.48

Details
Mass	2.73 M_{☉}
Radius	2.8±0.3 R_{☉}
Luminosity	72.49 L_{☉}
Surface gravity (log g)	4.05 cgs
Temperature	11,036±375 K
Rotational velocity (v sin i)	96 km/s
Age	201 Myr

Other designations
- 21 CVn, BK Canum Venaticorum, BD+50°1994, FK5 3063, HD 115735, HIP 64906, HR 5023, SAO 44556

Database references
SIMBAD	data

21 Canum Venaticorum is a single variable star in the northern constellation of Canes Venatici, located 279 light years away from the Sun. This object has the variable star designation BK Canum Venaticorum; 21 Canum Venaticorum is the Flamsteed designation. It is visible to the naked eye as a faint white-hued star with a baseline apparent visual magnitude of +5.14.

According to Garrison et al. (1994) this is a B-type subgiant star with a stellar classification of B9 IV (Si), where the suffix notation indicates this is a Silicon star. Cowley et al. (1969) listed it with a class of A0 V Si:, which would match an A-type main-sequence star with the ':' indicating some uncertainty in the classification. It is a marginally chemically-peculiar star with weaker than normal helium absorption lines and displaying helium line variability. The widths of the lines of ionized silicon vary with a period of 21.12 ± 0.48 hours.

21 Canum Venaticorum is classified as an Alpha^{2} Canum Venaticorum type variable star and its brightness varies by 0.04 magnitudes over a period of 18.4 hours. Its variability was discovered in 1984 by Juraj Zverko and it was given its variable star designation in 1987. It is around 201 million years old and is spinning with a relatively high projected rotational velocity of 96 km/s. The star has 2.73 times the mass of the Sun and 2.8 times the Sun's radius. It is radiating 72 times the luminosity of the Sun from its photosphere at an effective temperature of 11,036 K.
