= HD 115004 =

Star in constellation Canes Venatici

- Location of HD 115004 (circled in red)

Observation data Epoch J2000 Equinox J2000
- Constellation: Canes Venatici
- Right ascension: 13^{h} 13^{m} 42.94245^{s}
- Declination: +40° 09′ 10.3802″
- Apparent magnitude (V): 4.94

Characteristics
- Evolutionary stage: horizontal branch
- Spectral type: G8.5 III CN0.5
- B−V color index: 1.061±0.002

Astrometry
Radial velocity (R_{v})	−22.10±0.14 km/s
Proper motion (μ)	RA: −51.21 mas/yr Dec.: +14.75 mas/yr
Parallax (π)	7.10±0.24 mas
Distance	460 ± 20 ly (141 ± 5 pc)
Absolute magnitude (M_{V})	−0.80

Details
Mass	3.17±0.26 M_{☉}
Radius	22.89±0.85 R_{☉}
Luminosity	241.7±17.3 L_{☉}
Surface gravity (log g)	2.23±0.05 cgs
Temperature	4,761±24 K
Metallicity [Fe/H]	−0.10±0.10 dex
Rotational velocity (v sin i)	5.8 km/s
Age	440±130 Myr

Other designations
- BD+40°2633, HD 115004, HIP 64540, HR 4997, SAO 44519

Database references
SIMBAD	data

HD 115004 is a single star in the northern constellation of Canes Venatici. It is faintly visible to the naked eye with an apparent visual magnitude of 4.94. Based upon an annual parallax shift of 7.10±0.24 mas, it is located around 460 light years from the Sun. The star is moving closer with a heliocentric radial velocity of −22 km/s. HD 115004 will make its closest approach in about 1.7 million years at a separation of around 390 ly (119.45 pc).

This is an evolved giant star, most likely (97% chance) on the horizontal branch, with a stellar classification of G8.5 III CN0.5. The suffix notation indicates a mild overabundance of the CN molecule in the stellar atmosphere. It has an estimated 3.2 times the mass of the Sun and, at the age of 440 million years, has expanded to 23 times the Sun's radius. The star is radiating around 242 times the Sun's luminosity from its enlarged photosphere at an effective temperature of 4,761 K.
