= 24 Canum Venaticorum =

Star in the constellation Canes Venatici

- Location of 24 Canum Venaticorum (circled in red)

Observation data Epoch J2000 Equinox ICRS
- Constellation: Canes Venatici
- Right ascension: 13^{h} 34^{m} 27.25928^{s}
- Declination: +49° 00′ 57.5065″
- Apparent magnitude (V): +4.68

Characteristics
- Evolutionary stage: main sequence
- Spectral type: A5V
- B−V color index: 0.132±0.005

Astrometry
Radial velocity (R_{v})	−18.3±2.8 km/s
Proper motion (μ)	RA: −128.38 mas/yr Dec.: +28.05 mas/yr
Parallax (π)	18.09±0.19 mas
Distance	180 ± 2 ly (55.3 ± 0.6 pc)
Absolute magnitude (M_{V})	0.85

Details
Mass	1.74 M_{☉}
Radius	1.90 R_{☉}
Luminosity	40.8+1.1 −1.0 L_{☉}
Surface gravity (log g)	3.97 cgs
Temperature	8,285±282 K
Rotational velocity (v sin i)	159 km/s
Age	310 Myr

Other designations
- 24 CVn, BD+49°2227, FK5 3083, GC 18356, HD 118232, HIP 66234, HR 5112, SAO 44668

Database references
SIMBAD	data

24 Canum Venaticorum is a single star in the northern constellation of Canes Venatici, located 277 light years away from the Sun. This object is visible to the naked eye as a faint white-hued star with an apparent visual magnitude of +4.68. It is moving closer to the Earth with a heliocentric radial velocity of −18 km/s.

This is an A-type main-sequence star with a stellar classification of A4 V, and it is a shell star with rotationally-broadened lines. It is 310 million years old with a projected rotational velocity of 159 km/s. This rate of spin is giving the star an oblate shape with an equatorial bulge that is 7% larger than the polar radius. The star has 1.74 times the mass of the Sun and 1.9 times the Sun's radius. It is radiating 41 times the Sun's luminosity from its photosphere at an effective temperature of 8,285 K.

24 Canum Venaticorum displays a significant infrared excess at wavelengths of 24μm and 70μm, indicating an orbiting circumstellar debris disk. The signature matches a black body temperature of 464 K for an estimated orbital radius of 1.4 AU.
