= 5 Canum Venaticorum =

Probable binary star system in the constellation Canes Venatici

- Location of 5 Canum Venaticorum (circled in red)

Observation data Epoch J2000 Equinox ICRS
- Constellation: Canes Venatici
- Right ascension: 12^{h} 24^{m} 01.49828^{s}
- Declination: +51° 33′ 44.1257″
- Apparent magnitude (V): +4.767

Characteristics
- Evolutionary stage: red giant branch
- Spectral type: G7 III Ba0.3
- B−V color index: 0.868

Astrometry
Radial velocity (R_{v})	−13.9 km/s
Proper motion (μ)	RA: +12.955 mas/yr Dec.: +11.323 mas/yr
Parallax (π)	8.6643±0.0776 mas
Distance	376 ± 3 ly (115 ± 1 pc)
Absolute magnitude (M_{V})	−0.68

Details
Mass	2.96 M_{☉}
Radius	12 R_{☉}
Luminosity	174 L_{☉}
Surface gravity (log g)	2.60 cgs
Temperature	5,098±75 K
Metallicity [Fe/H]	+0.01 dex
Rotational velocity (v sin i)	6.6 km/s
Age	530 Myr

Other designations
- 5 CVn, BD+52°1626, FK5 2994, GC 16906, HD 107950, HIP 60485, HR 4716, SAO 28366

Database references
SIMBAD	data

5 Canum Venaticorum is a probable binary star system in the northern constellation of Canes Venatici, located about 376 light years from the Sun. It is visible to the naked eye as a faint, yellow-hued star with an apparent visual magnitude of +4.77. The system is moving closer to the Earth with a heliocentric radial velocity of −14 km/s.

The visible component is an evolved G-type giant star with a stellar classification of G7 III Ba0.3. The 'Ba0.3' suffix notation indicates this is a mild barium star, which means that the stellar atmosphere has been enhanced by s-process elements most likely provided by what is now an orbiting white dwarf companion. The primary is 530 million years old with 2.96 times the mass of the Sun and has expanded to about 12 times the Sun's radius. It is radiating 174 times the Sun's luminosity from its enlarged photosphere at an effective temperature of 5,098 K.

In Chinese astronomy, 5 Canum Venaticorum is called 相, Pinyin: Xiāng, meaning Prime Minister, because this star is marking itself and stand alone in Prime Minister asterism, Purple Forbidden enclosure mansion (see : Chinese constellation).
