= 10 Canum Venaticorum =

Star in the constellation Canes Venatici

- Location of 10 Canum Venaticorum (circled in red)

Observation data Epoch J2000 Equinox ICRS
- Constellation: Canes Venatici
- Right ascension: 12^{h} 44^{m} 59.405^{s}
- Declination: +39° 16′ 44.10″
- Apparent magnitude (V): 5.95

Characteristics
- Evolutionary stage: Main sequence
- Spectral type: G0 V
- U−B color index: –0.03
- B−V color index: +0.55

Astrometry
Radial velocity (R_{v})	+80.3 km/s
Proper motion (μ)	RA: –359.699 mas/yr Dec.: +139.016 mas/yr
Parallax (π)	56.9588±0.0323 mas
Distance	57.26 ± 0.03 ly (17.557 ± 0.010 pc)
Absolute magnitude (M_{V})	4.76

Details
Mass	0.87+0.04 −0.03 M_{☉}
Radius	0.98±0.02 R_{☉}
Luminosity	1.104±0.002 L_{☉}
Surface gravity (log g)	4.29 cgs
Temperature	5,968+58 −41 K
Metallicity [Fe/H]	–0.53 dex
Rotation	13 days
Rotational velocity (v sin i)	8.11 km/s
Age	6.3 Gyr

Other designations
- 10 CVn, BD+40°2570, GJ 484, HD 110897, HIP 62207, HR 4845, SAO 63177

Database references
SIMBAD	data

10 Canum Venaticorum is an ordinary star in the northern constellation of Canes Venatici. It has an apparent visual magnitude of 5.95, which, according to the Bortle scale, can be faintly seen with the naked eye from suburban locations. Based upon an annual parallax shift of 0.057 arcseconds, this system is 57.26 light-years (17.557 parsecs) from Sun. It is drifting further away with a radial velocity of +80 km/s.

The stellar classification of 10 Canum Venaticorum is G0 V, indicating that it is a G-type main sequence star that is fusing hydrogen into helium at its core to generate energy. The NStars project found a similar class of F9V Fe−0.3, indicating a mild underabundance of iron. It is older than the Sun, with an estimated age of six billion years. The star has around 98% of the Sun's radius and 87% of the solar mass. It rotates about the axis an average of once every 13 days, with a projected rotational velocity along the equator of 8 km/s. The abundance of elements other than hydrogen and helium is lower than in the Sun. The effective temperature of the stellar atmosphere is 5,968 K, giving it the yellow hue of a G-type star.

An excess of infrared emission at a wavelength of 70 μm suggests the presence of a debris disk. The best fit disk model suggest a broad dust annulus with a peak brightness at a radius of 53.7 AU, that is inclined by an angle of 56° to the line of sight from the Earth along a position angle of 111.2°.
