= 6 Canum Venaticorum =

Star in the constellation Canes Venatici

Observation data Epoch J2000 Equinox ICRS
- Constellation: Canes Venatici
- Right ascension: 12^{h} 25^{m} 50.93786^{s}
- Declination: +39° 01′ 07.0195″
- Apparent magnitude (V): +5.01

Characteristics
- Evolutionary stage: horizontal branch
- Spectral type: G9 III
- B−V color index: 0.94

Astrometry
| Radial velocity (R_{v}) | −4.17±0.33 km/s |
| Proper motion (μ) | RA: −77.335 mas/yr Dec.: −33.782 mas/yr |
| Parallax (π) | 13.2764±0.2086 mas |
| Distance | 246 ± 4 ly (75 ± 1 pc) |
| Absolute magnitude (M_{V}) | 0.65±0.044 |

Details
| Mass | 2.04 M_{☉} |
| Radius | 9 R_{☉} |
| Luminosity | 67.6 L_{☉} |
| Surface gravity (log g) | 2.8 cgs |
| Temperature | 4,938±21 K |
| Metallicity [Fe/H] | −0.11 dex |
| Rotational velocity (v sin i) | 0.0 km/s |
| Age | 2.05 Gyr |

Other designations
- 6 CVn, BD+39°2521, FK5 461, HD 108225, HIP 60646, HR 4728, SAO 63000

Database references
| SIMBAD | data |

6 Canum Venaticorum is a single star in the northern constellation Canes Venatici, located 246 light years from the Sun. It is visible to the naked eye as a faint yellow-hued star with an apparent visual magnitude of +5.01. The star is moving closer to the Earth with a heliocentric radial velocity of −4.2 km/s.

This is an evolved G-type giant star with a stellar classification of G9 III, which means it has exhausted the hydrogen supply at its core and expanded. It is a red clump giant, indicating that it is on the horizontal branch and is generating energy through the helium fusion at its core. Data from the Hipparcos mission provided evidence of microvariability with an amplitude of 0.0056 in magnitude and a frequency of 0.00636 per day, or one cycle every 157 days.

6 Canum Venaticorum is about two billion years old with double the mass of the Sun. It has expanded to 9 times the Sun's radius and is radiating 68 times the Sun's luminosity from its photosphere at an effective temperature of 4,938 K.
