= DV Piscium =

Multiple star system in the constellation Pisces

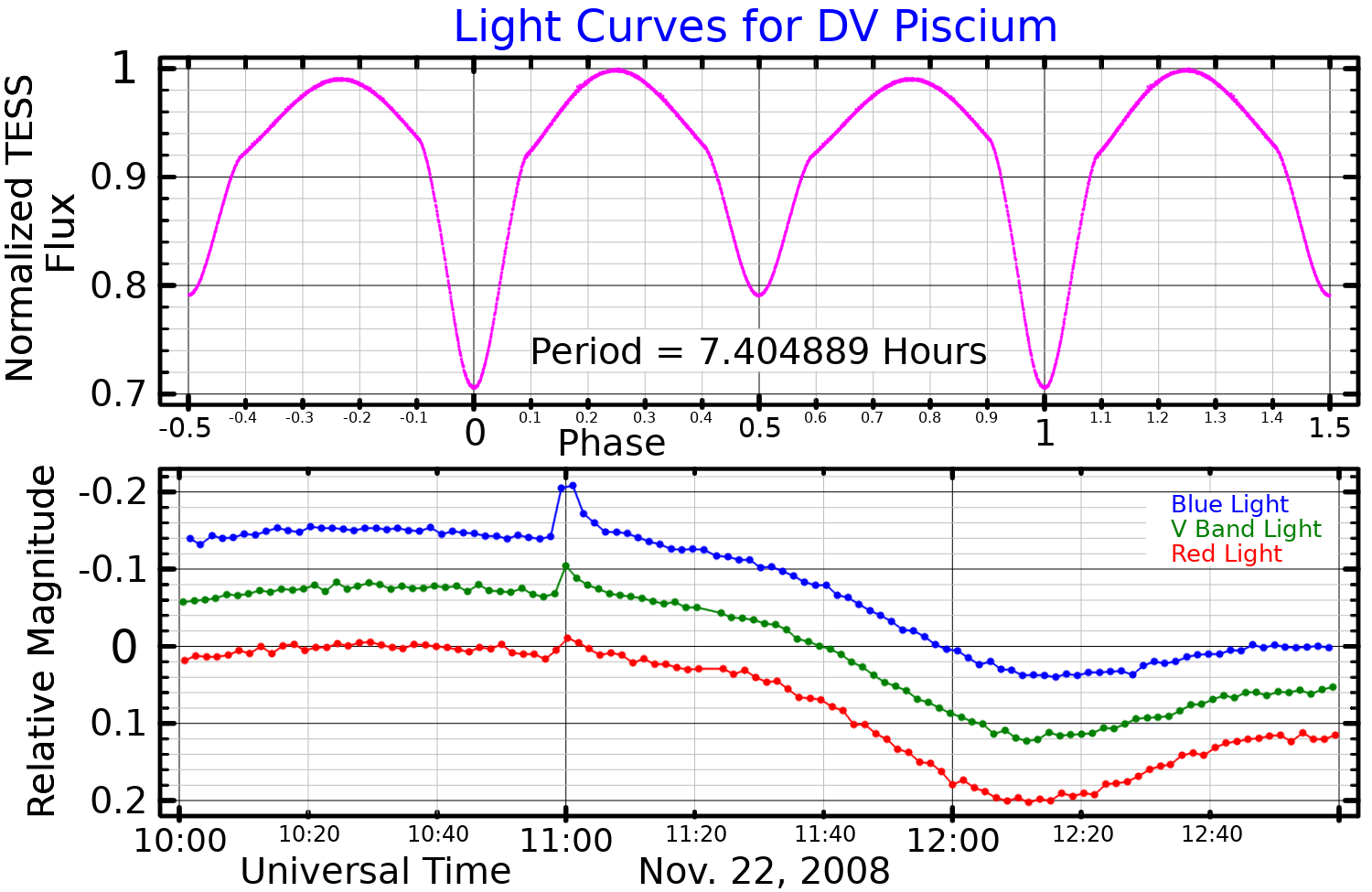
- Light curves for DV Piscium. The upper panel, plotted from TESS data, shows the periodic variability due to eclipses. The bottom panel, adapted from Zhang et al., shows the flare which occurred at UT 11:00 on Nov. 22, 2008, in three photometric bands.

Observation data Epoch J2000.0 Equinox ICRS
- Constellation: Pisces
- Right ascension: 00^{h} 13^{m} 09.204^{s}
- Declination: +05° 35′ 43.01″
- Apparent magnitude (V): 10.53 to 11.13

Characteristics
- Evolutionary stage: main sequence
- Spectral type: K5Ve
- Variable type: Eclipsing RS CVn

Astrometry
Radial velocity (R_{v})	−27.8 km/s
Proper motion (μ)	RA: −111.396 mas/yr Dec.: −203.771 mas/yr
Parallax (π)	23.7216±0.0223 mas
Distance	137.5 ± 0.1 ly (42.16 ± 0.04 pc)
Absolute magnitude (M_{V})	9.9±1.2

Orbit
Period (P)	0.30853609 d
Semi-major axis (a)	2.038 R_{☉}
Eccentricity (e)	0.00
Inclination (i)	74.220±0.353°
Periastron epoch (T)	2,451,794.1921±0.0004 HJD
Argument of periastron (ω) (secondary)	0.00°
Semi-amplitude (K_{1}) (primary)	131.62±0.55 km/s
Semi-amplitude (K_{2}) (secondary)	187.55±1.80 km/s

Details

Primary
Mass	0.68±0.02 M_{☉}
Radius	0.73±0.01 R_{☉}
Luminosity	0.186±0.009 L_{☉}
Temperature	4,450±40 K
Rotational velocity (v sin i)	120±20 km/s
Age	1.8±0.5 Gyr

Secondary
Mass	0.47±0.02 M_{☉}
Radius	0.52±0.01 R_{☉}
Luminosity	0.044±0.003 L_{☉}
Temperature	3,680±50 K

Other designations
- DV Psc, WDS J00132+0536C, LTT 10072, GSC 8-324

Database references
SIMBAD	data

DV Piscium is a triple star system in the equatorial constellation of Pisces, abbreviated DV Psc. It is an eclipsing binary variable of the RS Canum Venaticorum class. The pair have a combinedof about apparent visual magnitude 11, which is too faint to be visible with the naked eye. Based on parallax measurements, DV Piscium is located at a distance of 137.5 light years from the Sun. It is drifting closer with a radial velocity of −28 km/s.

In 1994, this target was found to show emission line features in the calcium H and K lines. It was classified as a K-type star with high proper motion in 1986. Data from the ROSAT satellite showed significant X-ray emission. In 1999, it was shown to be a near-contact eclipsing binary star system by R. M. Robb and associates, with an orbital period of 0.30855 days. The shape of the light curve suggested the presence of one or more star spots on the cooler component. A flare event was observed on November 22, 2008, indicative of a high level of magnetic activity.

Combining photometric results across several years demonstrated that the light curve is highly variable, with star spot activity on both components. This varied over time in quantity, size, and location. This is a detached binary system with the components in near contact at a separation of just two solar radii. As of 2007, the period of the system is decreasing over time at a rate of about −8.6×10^{−7} d·yr^{–1}. The primary component has 68% of the mass of the Sun and 73% of the Sun's radius; the cooler secondary has 47% of the mass and 52% of the radius of the Sun. Both components are slightly evolved main sequence stars. The system has an activity cycle estimated at 14.74±0.84 years.

Evidence from O–C diagrams suggests there is a third component to this system, orbiting the inner pair with a period of 9.79±0.60 years on an eccentric orbit. This body has less than 62% of the mass of the Sun.
