= Flare star =

Variable star that brightens unpredictably

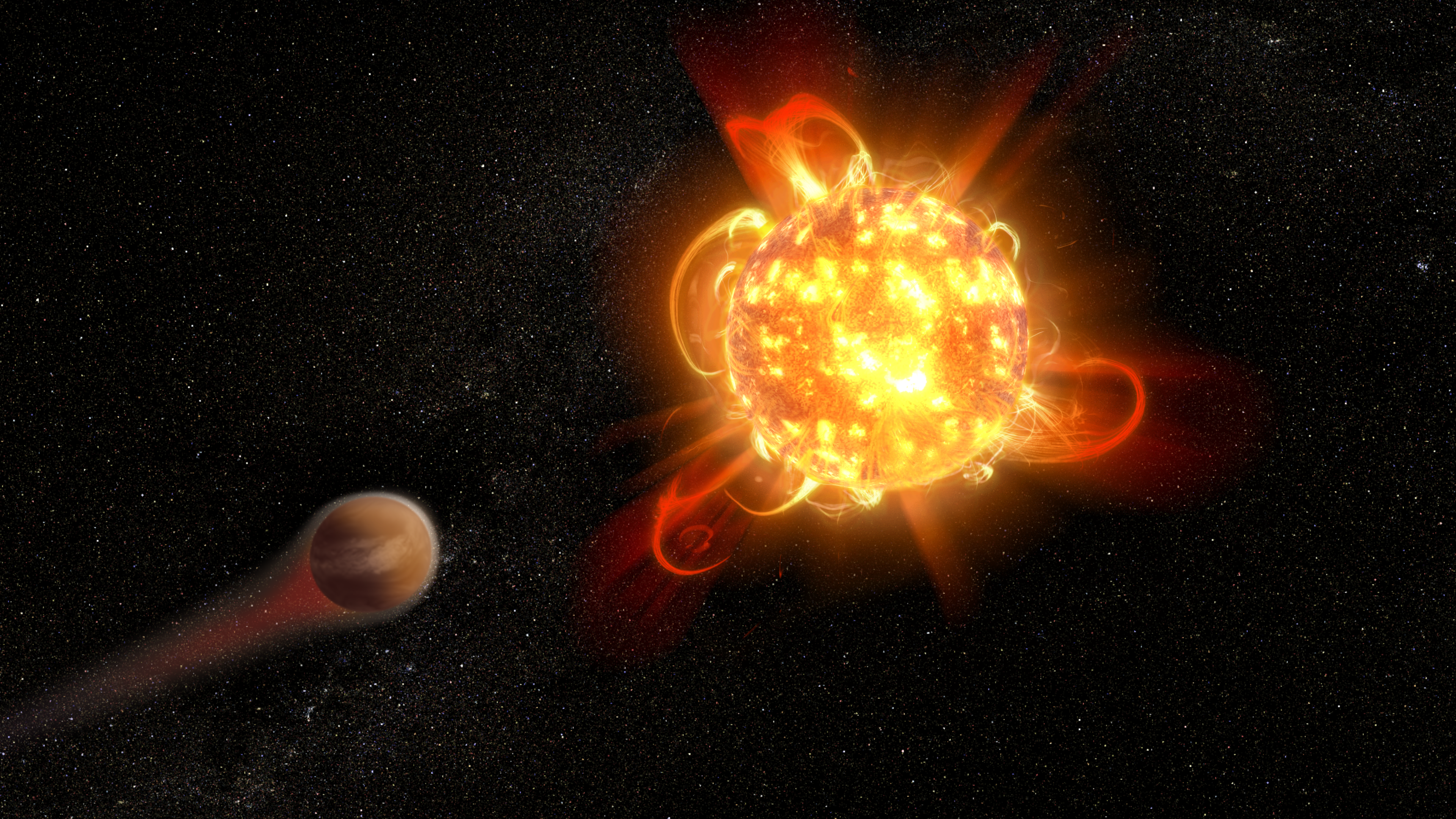
An artistic illustration of an M-type flare star stripping away the atmosphere of its planet

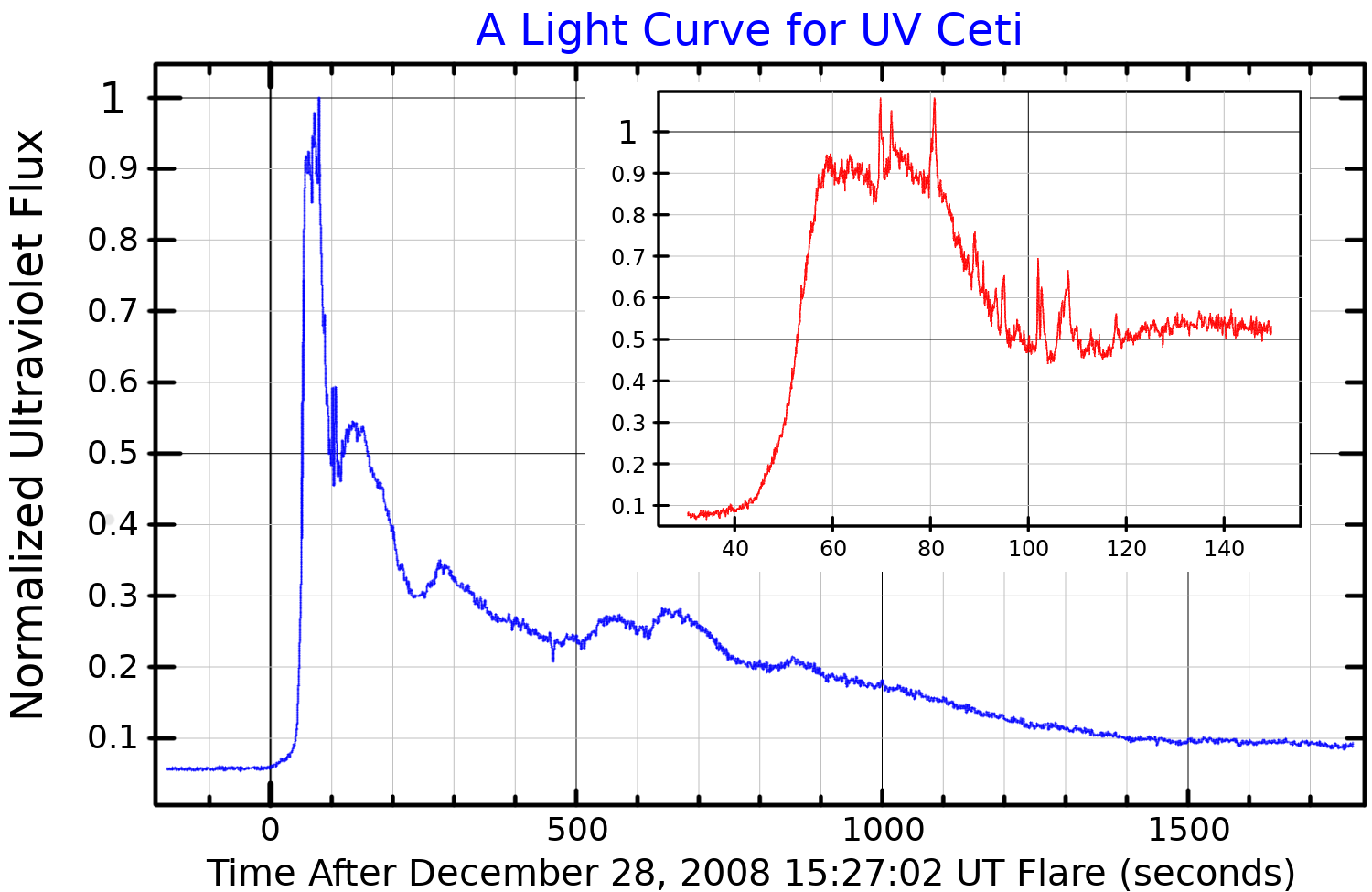
An ultraviolet light curve for UV Ceti, adapted from Beskin et al. (2017). The main plot shows the full flare event and the inset plot shows the time around peak brightness with an expanded time scale.

A flare star is a variable star that can undergo unpredictable dramatic increases in brightness for a few minutes. It is believed that the flares on flare stars are analogous to solar flares in that they are powered by magnetic energy stored in the stars' atmospheres. The brightness increase is across the electromagnetic spectrum, from X-rays to radio waves. Flare activity among late-type stars was first reported by A. van Maanen in 1945, for WX Ursae Majoris and YZ Canis Minoris. However, the best-known flare star is UV Ceti, first observed to flare in 1948. Today similar flare stars are classified as UV Ceti type variable stars (using the abbreviation UV) in variable star catalogs such as the General Catalogue of Variable Stars.

Most flare stars are dim red dwarfs, although recent research indicates that less massive brown dwarfs might also be capable of flaring. The more massive RS Canum Venaticorum variables (RS CVn) are also known to flare, but it is understood that these flares are induced by a companion star in a binary system which causes the magnetic field to become tangled.

Nine stars similar to the Sun had also been seen to undergo flare events prior to the flood of superflare data from the Kepler observatory. It has been proposed that the mechanism for this is similar to that of the RS CVn variables in that the flares are being induced by a companion, namely an unseen Jupiter-like planet in a close orbit.

== Stellar Flare Model ==
The Sun is known to flare and solar flares have been extensively studied over all the spectrum. Even though the Sun on average shows less variability and weaker flares compared with other stars that are similar to the Sun in spectral type, rotation period and age, it is generally thought that other stellar flares and the solar flares share the same or similar processes. Thus the solar flare model has been used as the framework for understanding other stellar flares.

The general idea is that flares are generated through the reconnection of the magnetic field lines in the corona. There are several phases for the flare: preflare phase, impulsive phase, flash phase and decay phase. Those phases have different timescales and different emissions across the spectrum. During the preflare phase, which usually lasts for a few minutes, the coronal plasmas slowly heats up to temperatures of tens of millions Kelvin. This phase is mostly visible to soft X-rays and EUV. During the impulsive phase, which lasts for three to ten minutes, a large number of electrons and sometimes also ions are accelerated to extremely high energies ranging from keV to MeV. The radiation can be seen as gyrosynchrotron radiation in the radio wavelengths and bremsstrahlung radiation in the hard X-rays wavelengths. This is the phase where most of the energy is released. The later flash phase is defined by the rapid increase in Hα emissions. The free streaming particles travel along the magnetic lines, propagating energy from the corona to the lower chromosphere. The material in the chromosphere is then heated up and expands to the corona. Emission in the flash phase is primarily due to thermal radiation from the heated stellar atmosphere. As the material reaches the corona, the intensive release of energy slows down and cooling starts. During the decay phase which lasts for one to several hours, the corona returns back to its original state.

This is the model for how an isolated star generates flares but this is not the only way. Interactions between a star and the companion or sometimes the environment can also produce flares. In binary systems such as RS Canum Venaticorum variable stars (RS CVn), flares can be produced through the interactions between the magnetic fields of the two bodies in the systems. For stars that have an accretion disk, which most of the time are protostars or pre-main sequence stars, the interactions of magnetic fields between the stars and the disk can also cause flares.

== Nearby flare stars ==
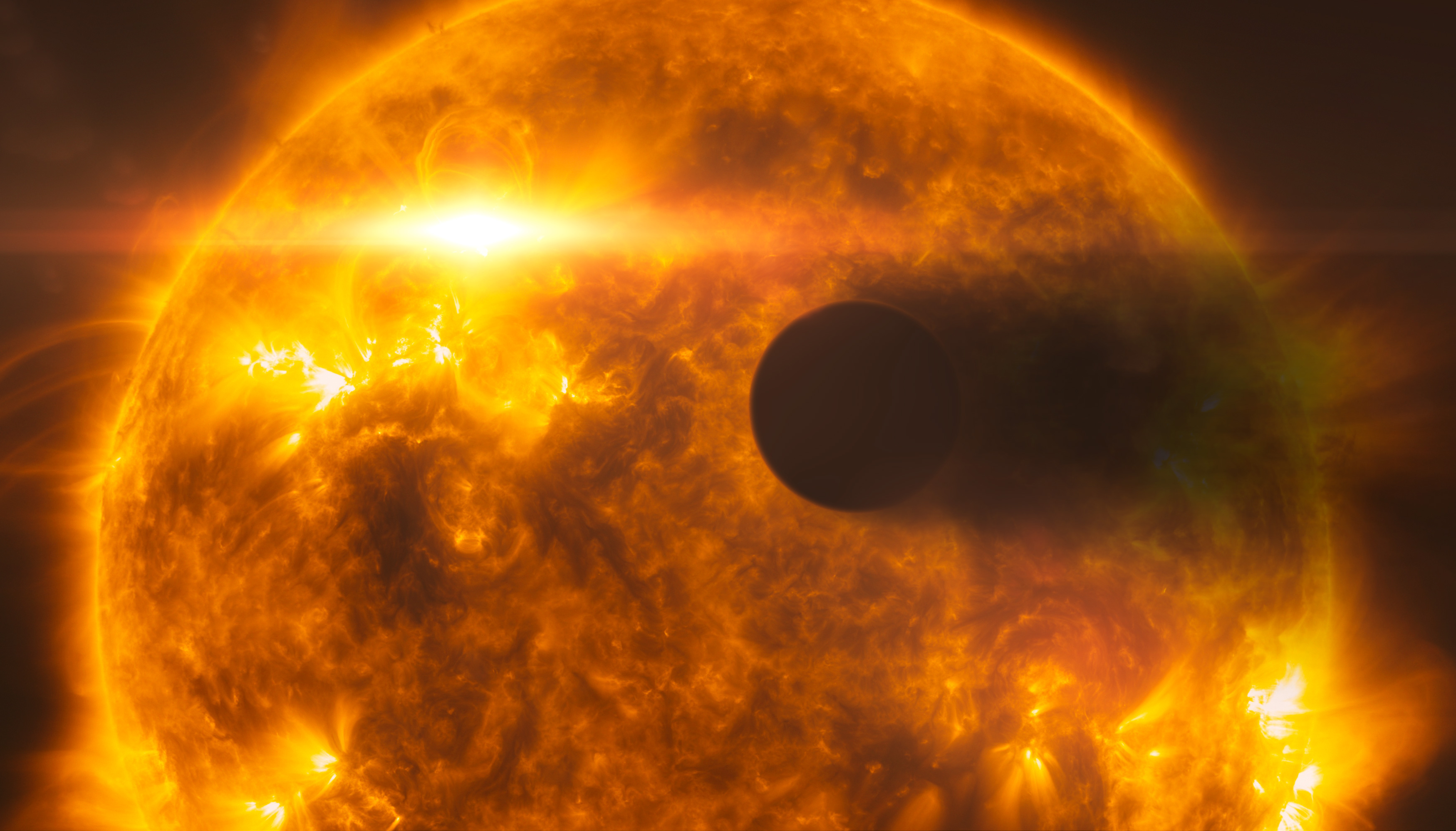
A flare star with orbiting planet (artist's impression)

Flare stars are intrinsically faint, but have been found to distances of 1,000 light years from Earth. On April 23, 2014, NASA's Swift satellite detected the strongest, hottest, and longest-lasting sequence of stellar flares ever seen from a nearby red dwarf, DG Canum Venaticorum. The initial blast from this record-setting series of explosions was as much as 10,000 times more powerful than the largest solar flare ever recorded.

=== Proxima Centauri ===
The Sun's nearest stellar neighbor Proxima Centauri is a flare star that undergoes occasional increases in brightness because of magnetic activity. The star's magnetic field is created by convection throughout the stellar body, and the resulting flare activity generates a total X-ray emission similar to that produced by the Sun.

=== Wolf 359 ===
The flare star Wolf 359 is another near neighbor (2.39 ± 0.01 parsecs). This star, also known as Gliese 406 and CN Leo, is a red dwarf of spectral class M6.5 that emits X-rays. It is a UV Ceti flare star, and has a relatively high flare rate.

The mean magnetic field has a strength of about 2.2 kG (0.2 T), but this varies significantly on time scales as short as six hours. By comparison, the magnetic field of the Sun averages 1 G (100 μT), although it can rise as high as 3 kG (0.3 T) in active sunspot regions.

=== Barnard's Star ===
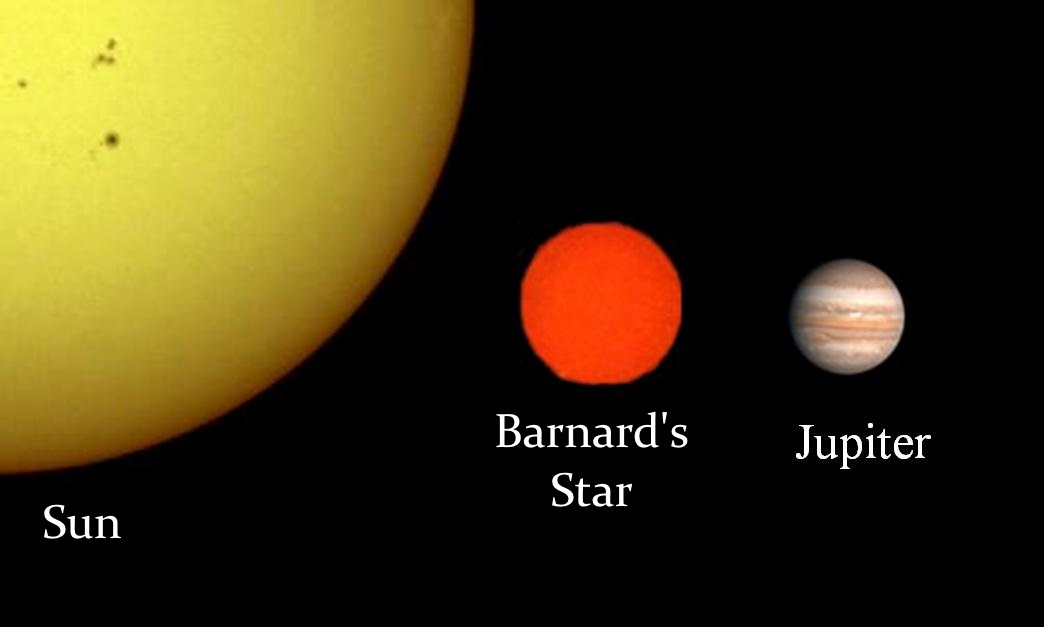
Size comparison between Jupiter, Barnard's Star and the Sun

Barnard's Star is the fourth nearest star to the Sun. At 7–12 billion years of age, Barnard's Star is considerably older than the Sun. It was long assumed to be quiescent in terms of stellar activity. However, in 1998, astronomers observed an intense stellar flare, showing that Barnard's Star is a flare star.

=== EV Lacertae ===
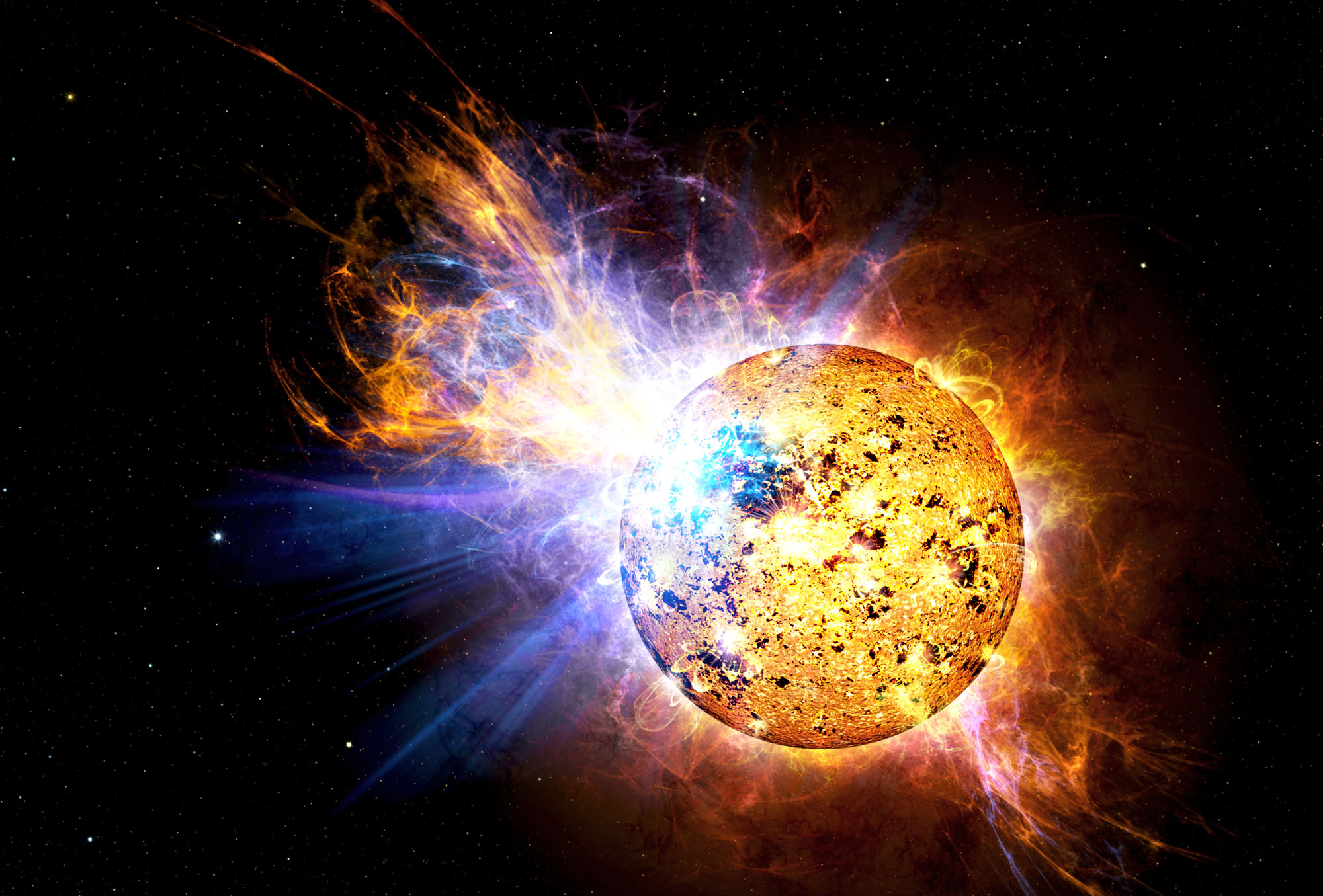
Artist's conception of a flare explosion on EV Lacertae

EV Lacertae is located 16.5 light-years away, and is the nearest star in its constellation. It is a young star, about 300 million years old, and has a strong magnetic field. In 2008, it produced a record-setting flare that was thousands of times more powerful than the largest observed solar flare.

=== TVLM513-46546 ===
TVLM 513-46546 is a very low mass M9 flare star, at the boundary between red dwarfs and brown dwarfs. Data from Arecibo Observatory at radio wavelengths determined that the star flares every 7054 s with a precision of one one-hundredth of a second.

=== 2MASS J18352154-3123385 A ===
The more massive member of the binary star 2MASS J1835, an M6.5 star, has strong X-ray activity indicative of a flare star, although it has never been directly observed to flare.

== Record-setting flares ==
The most powerful stellar flare detected, as of December 2005, may have come from the active binary II Peg. Its observation by Swift suggested the presence of hard X-rays in the well-established Neupert effect as seen in solar flares.
