= Willem Jacob Luyten =

Dutch-American astronomer (1899–1994)

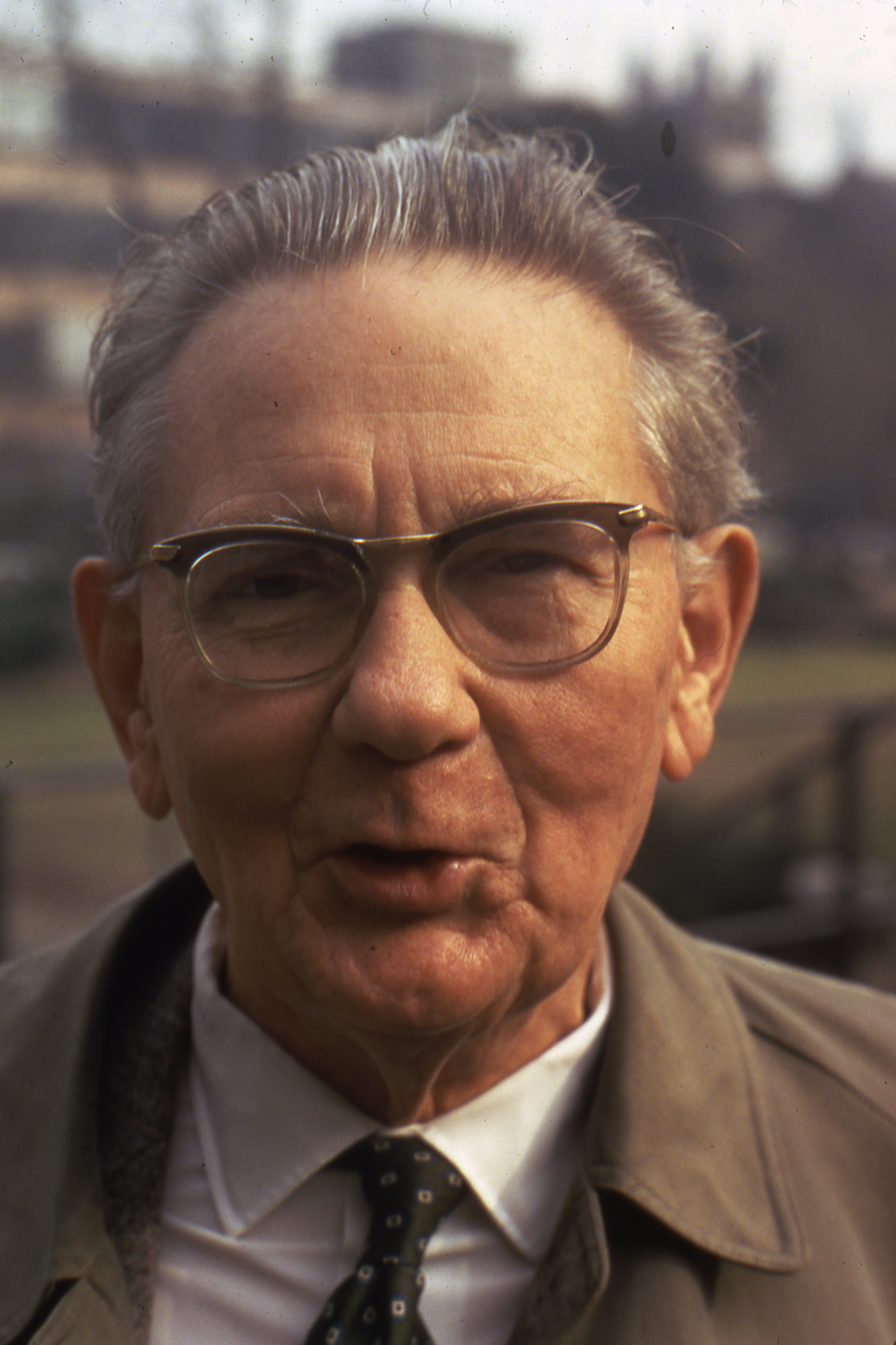
- Luyten in 1971
- Born: March 7, 1899; Semarang, Java, Dutch East Indies
- Died: November 21, 1994 (aged 95); Minneapolis, United States
- Education: Leiden University
- Awards: James Craig Watson Medal (1964); Bruce Medal (1968)
- Scientific career
- Fields: astronomy
- Workplaces: Lick Observatory, Harvard College Observatory; University of Minnesota
- Doctoral advisor: Ejnar Hertzsprung

Willem Jacob Luyten (March 7, 1899 – November 21, 1994) was a Dutch-American astronomer.

== Life ==
Jacob Luyten was born in Semarang, Java, at the time part of the Dutch East Indies. His mother was Cornelia M. Francken and his father Jacob Luyten, a teacher of French.

At the age of 11 he observed Halley's Comet, which started his fascination with astronomy. He also had a knack for languages, and eventually could speak nine. In 1912 his family moved back to the Netherlands where he studied astronomy at the University of Amsterdam, receiving his BA in 1918.

At the age of 22, he was the first student to earn his PhD with Ejnar Hertzsprung at Leiden University. In 1921, he left for the United States where he first worked at the Lick Observatory. From 1923 to 1930 Luyten worked at the Harvard College Observatory eventually working at Harvard's Boyden Observatory in Bloemfontein, South Africa. He spent the years 1928–1930 in Bloemfontein, where he met Willemina H. Miedema and married her on February 5, 1930.

Upon his return to the United States in 1931, he taught at the University of Minnesota from 1931 to 1967, then served as astronomer emeritus from 1967 until his death.

Luyten studied the proper motions of stars and discovered many white dwarfs. He appears to have been the first to use the term white dwarf when he examined this class of stars in 1922. He also discovered some of the Sun's nearest neighbors, including Luyten's Star as well as the high–proper motion binary star system Luyten 726-8, which was soon found to contain the remarkable flare star UV Ceti.

He published a series of catalogues of high proper motion stars. He catalogued 17,000 high-proper motion stars in the Luyten Two-Tenths Arcsecond Catalog.

== Honors ==
Awards

- James Craig Watson Medal (1964)
- Bruce Medal (1968)

Named after him

- Asteroid 1964 Luyten
- Luyten's Star
