= BH Virginis =

Eclipsing binary star in the constellation Virgo

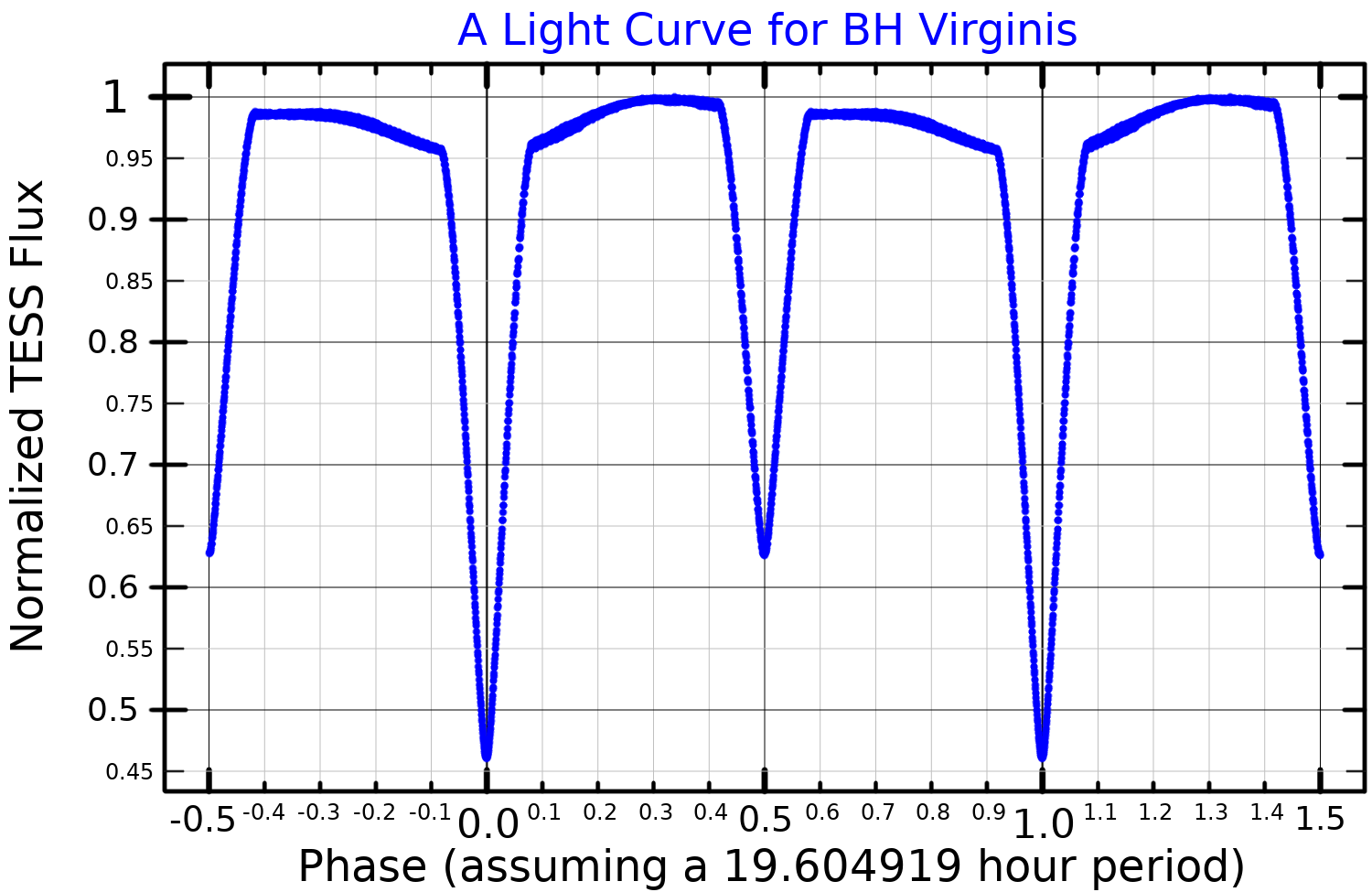
- A light curve for BH Virginis, plotted from TESS data

Observation data Epoch J2000.0 Equinox ICRS
- Constellation: Virgo
- Right ascension: 13^{h} 58^{m} 24.860^{s}
- Declination: −01° 39′ 38.95″
- Apparent magnitude (V): 9.60 - 10.56

Characteristics
- Evolutionary stage: Main sequence
- Spectral type: G0 V + G2 V
- B−V color index: 0.650±0.043
- Variable type: Algol + RS CVn

Astrometry
Radial velocity (R_{v})	−22.80±2.7 km/s
Proper motion (μ)	RA: 2.672 mas/yr Dec.: −5.742 mas/yr
Parallax (π)	6.6834±0.0181 mas
Distance	488 ± 1 ly (149.6 ± 0.4 pc)

Orbit
Period (P)	0.8169 d
Semi-major axis (a)	≥1.55 Gm (2.23 R_{☉})
Eccentricity (e)	0.0
Inclination (i)	87.5±0.8°
Periastron epoch (T)	2,431,241.389±1.0 JD
Argument of periastron (ω) (secondary)	0.0°
Semi-amplitude (K_{1}) (primary)	137.8 km/s
Semi-amplitude (K_{2}) (secondary)	135.2 km/s

Details

Component 1
Mass	1.173±0.006 M_{☉}
Radius	1.22±0.05 R_{☉}
Luminosity	2.19 L_{☉}
Surface gravity (log g)	4.30 cgs
Temperature	5,969±11 K
Metallicity [Fe/H]	+0.1 dex

Component 2
Mass	1.046±0.005 M_{☉}
Radius	1.11±0.04 R_{☉}
Luminosity	1.20 L_{☉}
Surface gravity (log g)	4.35 cgs
Temperature	5,500 K
Metallicity [Fe/H]	−0.3 dex

Other designations
- BH Vir, BD−00°2769, HD 121909, HIP 68258, PPM 179196

Database references
SIMBAD	data

BH Virginis is a binary star system in the equatorial constellation of Virgo. With a typical apparent visual magnitude of 9.6, it is too faint to be visible to the naked eye. Based on parallax measurements, it is located at a distance of approximately 488 light years from the Sun. The system is drifting closer with a net radial velocity of −23 km/s.

This system was determined to be a short period variable star by C. Hoffmeister in 1935. W. Zessewitsch found a period of 19.6 hours for the system in 1944. In 1957, M. Kitamura and associates refined the light curve of this Algol-type eclipsing variable and discovered some irregular fluctuations not explained by the eclipse cycle. R. H. Koch in 1967 reported observing a change in the depth of the primary eclipse. In 1982, M. Hoffmann concluded that both stars are intrinsically variable, indicating this is an RS Canum Venaticorum variable system.

This is a near-contact binary system with a circular orbit having a period of 19.61 hours. The orbital plane is inclined at an angle of 88° to the line of sight from the Earth, allowing both components to eclipse each other once per orbit. During the deep primary eclipse the system decreases in brightness by 0.96 magnitude, while the shallower secondary eclipse decreases the system by 0.64 magnitude. Cyclical oscillations in the orbital period have been observed with two short-term periods of 9.2 and 11.8 years, and a longer-term oscillation of 51.7 years. The short term oscillations may be due to magnetic activity on the stars, while the longer period could be caused by an unseen third body.

Both components of this system are G-type main-sequence stars, with stellar classifications of G0V and G2V, respectively. Evidence of star spots have been found on both stars, but appear to be predominantly on the secondary component. The two stars are somewhat larger and more massive than the Sun.
