= Chi1 Orionis =

Star in the constellation Orion

Chi^{1} Orionis A
- Star map of the Bayers Stars in Orion. Chi^{1} Orionis is indicated.

Observation data Epoch J2000 Equinox ICRS
- Constellation: Orion
- Right ascension: 05^{h} 54^{m} 22.96136^{s}
- Declination: +20° 16′ 34.5194″
- Apparent magnitude (V): 4.38 - 4.41

Characteristics
- Evolutionary stage: main sequence
- Spectral type: G0 V
- U−B color index: +0.07
- B−V color index: +0.59
- Variable type: RS CVn

Astrometry
Radial velocity (R_{v})	−15.42 km/s
Proper motion (μ)	RA: −179.014 mas/yr Dec.: −90.73 mas/yr
Parallax (π)	114.9497±0.5280 mas
Distance	28.4 ± 0.1 ly (8.70 ± 0.04 pc)
Absolute magnitude (M_{V})	4.82±0.005

Orbit
Period (P)	14.098±0.010 yr
Semi-major axis (a)	0.719±0.006" (6.25 AU (Note: Semi-major axis in AU = $\frac{semimajor\ axis\ in\ seconds}{parallax\ in\ seconds}\ {{=}}\ \frac{.719}{.1149497}$ = 6.25 AU; as the eccentricity is 0.454, the distance fluctuates between 55% and 145% of that, roughly from 3.42 AU to 9.09 AU.))
Eccentricity (e)	0.454+0.003 −0.002
Inclination (i)	92.69±0.39°
Longitude of the node (Ω)	306.51±0.51°
Periastron epoch (T)	2013.853±0.024
Argument of periastron (ω) (secondary)	110.74+0.42 −0.47°
Semi-amplitude (K_{1}) (primary)	1.876±0.003 km/s

Details

χ^{1} Ori A
Mass	1.075±0.033 M_{☉}
Radius	0.983±0.01 R_{☉}
Luminosity	1.042±0.042 L_{☉}
Surface gravity (log g)	4.47±0.02 cgs
Temperature	5,883±63 K
Metallicity [Fe/H]	−0.03±0.01 dex
Rotation	5.2 days
Rotational velocity (v sin i)	8.7 km/s
Age	300–400 Myr

χ^{1} Ori B
Mass	0.157±0.003 M_{☉}
Age	70-130 Myr

Other designations
- 54 Ori, Gl 222, HR 2047, BD+20°1162, HD 39587, LTT 11743, GCTP 1354.00, SAO 77705, HIP 27913

Database references
SIMBAD	data

Chi^{1} Orionis (χ^{1} Ori, χ^{1} Orionis) is a star about 28 light years away. It is in the constellation Orion, where it can be seen in the tip of the hunter's upraised club.

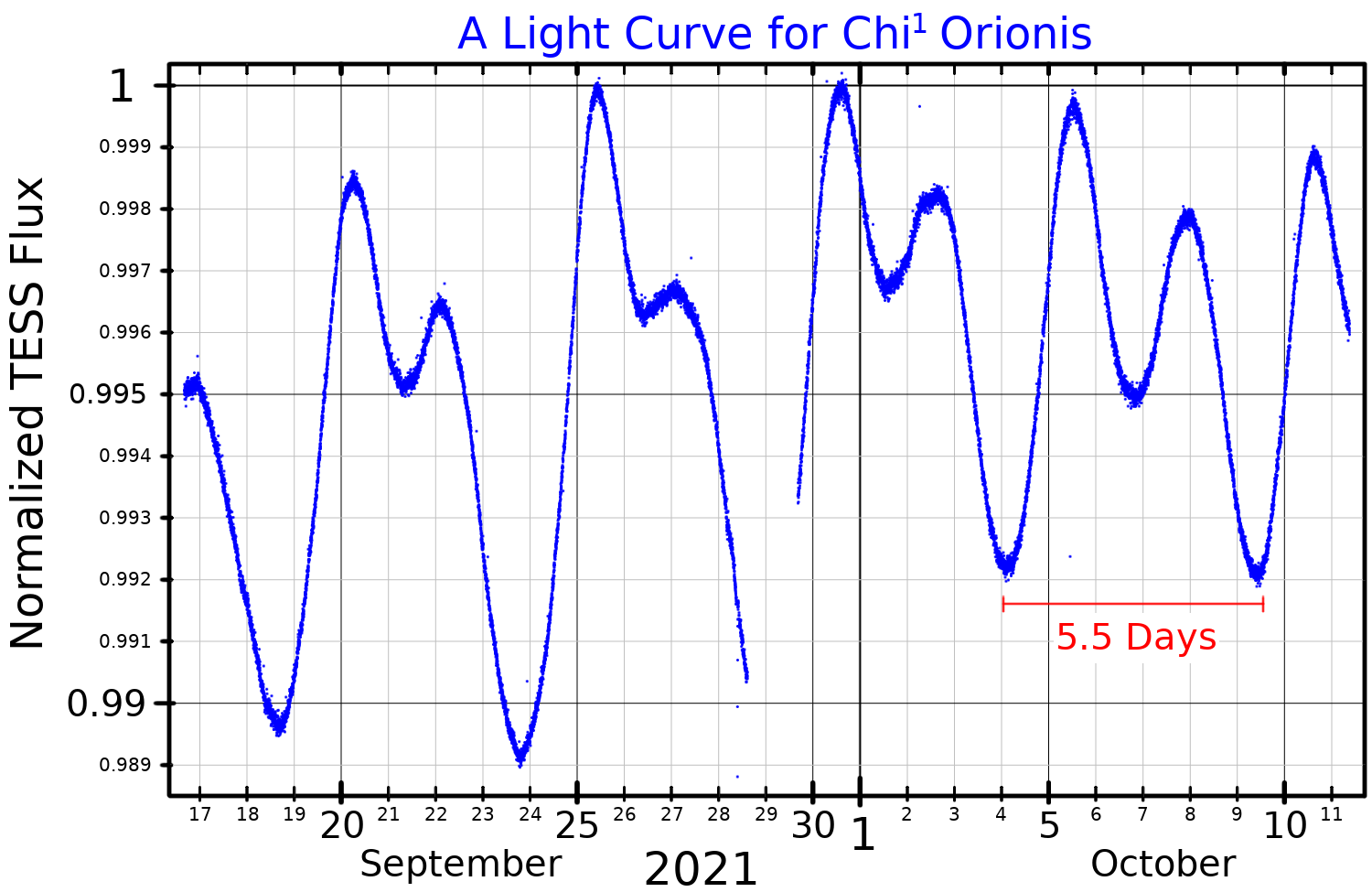
A light curve for Chi^{1} Orionis, plotted from TESS data. The 5.5 day period derived by Stępień and Geyer is marked in red.

χ^{1} Ori is a G0V star. It is listed in the General Catalog of Variable Stars as an RS Canum Venaticorum variable, varying between visual magnitude 4.38 and 4.41. Stępień and Geyer measured its period to be 5.5 days.

χ^{1} Ori has a faint companion with a mass estimated at 15% of the mass of the Sun, and an orbital period of 14.1 years. The companion orbits an average distance of 6.1 AU from the primary, but has a fairly high orbital eccentricity, ranging from 3.3 AU out to 8.9 AU from the primary. Because of this red dwarf companion, the likelihood of habitable planets in this system is low. It is thought that the companion is a red dwarf still contracting towards the main sequence.

A necessary condition for the existence of a planet in this system is stable zones where the object can remain in orbit for long intervals. For hypothetical planets in a circular orbit around the individual members of this star system, this maximum orbital radius is computed to be 1.01 AU for the primary and 0.41 AU for the secondary. (Note that the orbit of the Earth is 1 AU from the Sun.) A planet orbiting both stars would need to be at least 18.4 AU distant.

χ^{1} Ori is a candidate stream star member of the Ursa Major Moving Group, although there is some evidence to the contrary.

== See also ==
- List of star systems within 25–30 light-years
