= II Pegasi =

Star in the constellation Pegasus

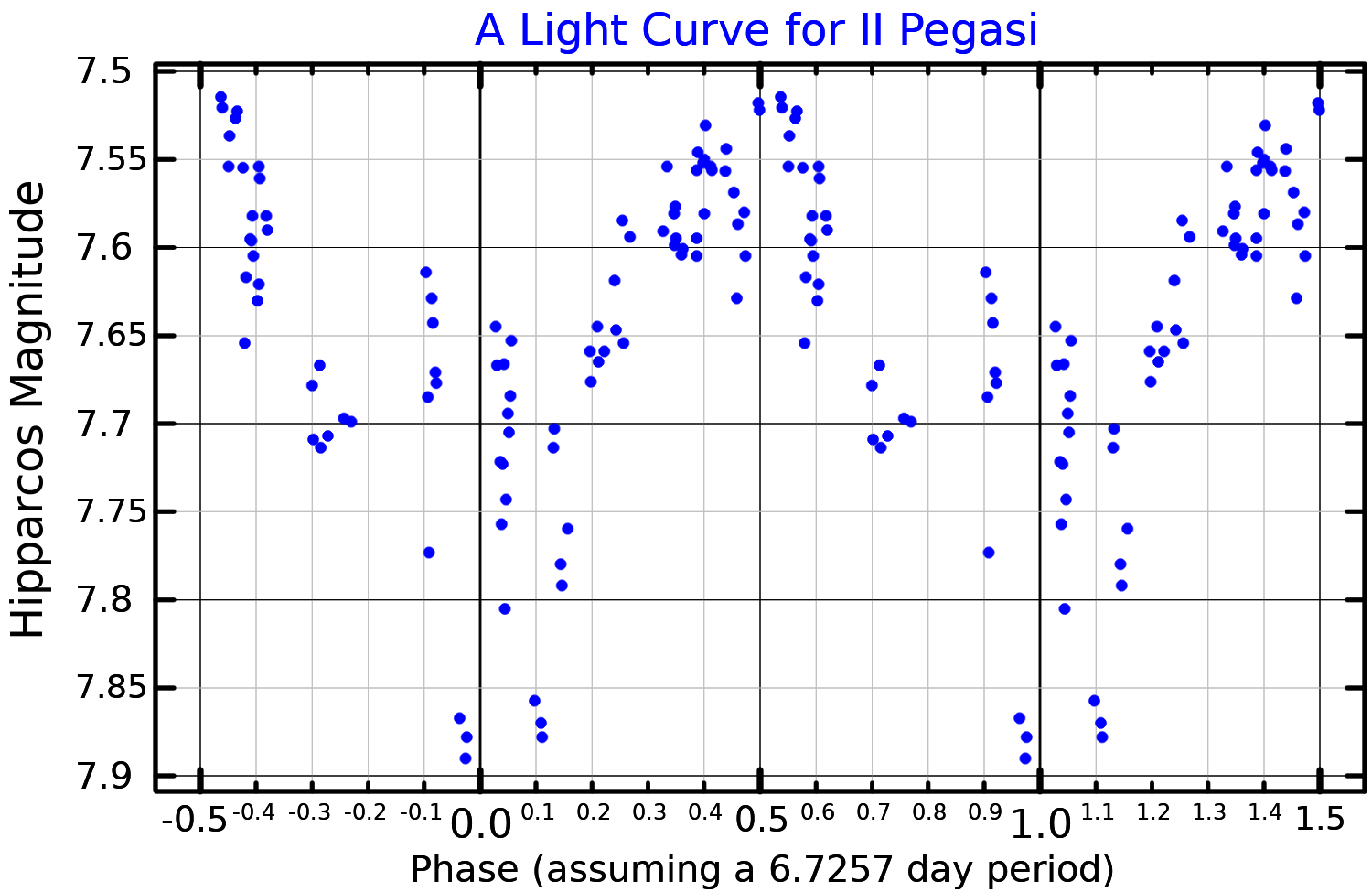
- A light curve for II Pegasi, plotted from Hipparcos data

Observation data Epoch J2000 Equinox ICRS
- Constellation: Pegasus
- Right ascension: 23^{h} 55^{m} 04.05313^{s}
- Declination: +28° 38′ 01.2422″
- Apparent magnitude (V): 7.18–7.78

Characteristics

II Pegasi A
- Evolutionary stage: subgiant
- Spectral type: K2 IV
- Variable type: RS CVn

II Pegasi B
- Evolutionary stage: main sequence
- Spectral type: M0-M3 V

Astrometry

II Pegasi A
Radial velocity (R_{v})	−20.50 km/s
Proper motion (μ)	RA: 576.22 mas/yr Dec.: 34.69 mas/yr
Parallax (π)	25.06±0.51 mas
Distance	130 ± 3 ly (39.9 ± 0.8 pc)
Absolute magnitude (M_{V})	3.8

Details

II Pegasi A
Mass	0.8 M_{☉}
Radius	3.4 R_{☉}
Luminosity	1.06 L_{☉}
Surface gravity (log g)	3.2 cgs
Temperature	4,600 K

II Pegasi B
Mass	0.4 M_{☉}
Luminosity	0.53 L_{☉}

Other designations
- II Peg, GJ 4375, HD 224085, BD+27°4642, HIP 117915, LHS 4044, SAO 91578

Database references
SIMBAD	data

II Pegasi is a binary star system in the constellation Pegasus with an apparent magnitude of between 7.2 and 7.8 and a distance of 130 light-years. It is a very active RS Canum Venaticorum variable (RS CVn), a close binary system with active starspots.

The primary (II Pegasi A) is a cool subgiant, an orange K-type star. It has begun to evolve off the main sequence and expand. Starspots cover about 40% of its surface. The star produces intense flares observable at all wavelengths.

Its smaller companion (II Pegasi B) is too close to be observed directly. It is a red dwarf, an M-type main-sequence star. The stars are tidally locked in a very close orbit with a period of 6.7 days and a separation of a few stellar radii.

X-ray flares from II Pegasi A were observed with the Ariel 5 satellite in the 1970s and with later X-ray observatories. In December 2005, a superflare was detected by the Swift Gamma-Ray Burst Mission. It was the largest stellar flare ever seen and was a hundred million times more energetic than the Sun's typical solar flare.
