= Gliese 65 =

Binary star in the constellation Cetus

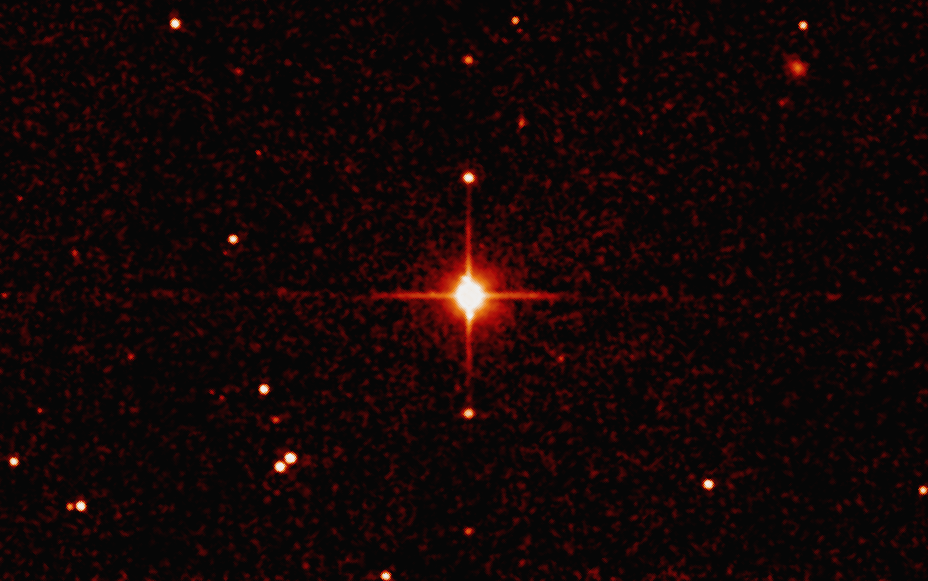
- Gliese 65, as seen during the Digitized Sky Survey

Observation data Epoch J2000 Equinox ICRS
- Constellation: Cetus
- Gliese 65 A (BL Ceti)
- Right ascension: 01^{h} 39^{m} 01.3773^{s}
- Declination: −17° 57′ 02.587″
- Apparent magnitude (V): 12.8
- Gliese 65 B (UV Ceti)
- Right ascension: 01^{h} 39^{m} 01.6377^{s}
- Declination: −17° 57′ 01.001″
- Apparent magnitude (V): 12.8

Characteristics

Gliese 65 A (BL Ceti)
- Spectral type: M5.5V
- U−B color index: +1.10
- B−V color index: +1.87
- Variable type: UV Cet

Gliese 65 B (UV Ceti)
- Spectral type: M6 V
- Variable type: UV Cet

Astrometry
| Parallax (π) | 371.92±0.42 mas |
| Distance | 8.770 ± 0.010 ly (2.689 ± 0.003 pc) |

Gliese 65 A (BL Ceti)
| Proper motion (μ) | RA: +3385.316 mas/yr Dec.: +544.386 mas/yr |
| Absolute magnitude (M_{V}) | 15.7 |

Gliese 65 B (UV Ceti)
| Proper motion (μ) | RA: +3178.694 mas/yr Dec.: +584.061 mas/yr |
| Absolute magnitude (M_{V}) | 15.7 |

Orbit
| Period (P) | 26.38±0.002 yr |
| Semi-major axis (a) | 2.0584±0.0097" (5.459±0.002 AU) |
| Eccentricity (e) | 0.6172±0.0001 |
| Inclination (i) | 128.0±0.1° |
| Longitude of the node (Ω) | 325.9±0.1° |
| Periastron epoch (T) | 41333±8 MJD (17 January 1972) |
| Argument of periastron (ω) (secondary) | 103.2±0.1° |

Details

Gliese 65 A
| Mass | 0.122±0.002 M_{☉} |
| Radius | 0.165±0.006 R_{☉} |
| Luminosity | 0.00147±0.00005 L_{☉} |
| Surface gravity (log g) | 5.092±0.015 cgs |
| Temperature | 2784±58 K |
| Metallicity [Fe/H] | −0.03±0.20 dex |
| Rotation | 0.2430±0.0005 days |
| Rotational velocity (v sin i) | 28.2±2 km/s |

Gliese 65 B
| Mass | 0.116±0.002 M_{☉} |
| Radius | 0.159±0.006 R_{☉} |
| Luminosity | 0.00125±0.00005 L_{☉} |
| Surface gravity (log g) | 5.113±0.015 cgs |
| Temperature | 2728±60 K |
| Metallicity [Fe/H] | −0.12±0.20 dex |
| Rotation | 0.2268±0.0003 days |
| Rotational velocity (v sin i) | 30.6±2 km/s |

Other designations
- GJ 65, G 272-61, L 726-8, PLX 343.1
- Gliese 65 A: BL Ceti, LHS 9, LP 768-27
- Gliese 65 B: UV Ceti, LHS 10, LP 768-26

Database references
| SIMBAD | The system |
- A (BL Cet)
- B (UV Cet)

Gliese 65, also known as Luyten 726-8, is a binary star system that is one of Earth's nearest neighbors, at 8.8 light-years (2.7 parsecs) from Earth in the constellation Cetus. The two component stars are both flare stars with the variable star designations BL Ceti and UV Ceti.

== Star system ==
The star system was discovered in 1948 by Willem Jacob Luyten in the course of compiling a catalog of stars of high proper motion; he noted its exceptionally high proper motion of 3.37 arc seconds annually and cataloged it as Luyten 726-8. The two stars are of nearly equal brightness, with visual magnitudes of 12.7 and 13.2 as seen from Earth. They orbit one another every 26.5 years. The distance between the two stars varies from 2.1 to 8.8 astronomical units (310 to 1,320 Gm). The Gliese 65 system is approximately 2.63 parsecs (8.58 ly) from Earth's Solar System, in the constellation Cetus, and is thus the seventh-closest star system to Earth. Its own nearest neighbor is Tau Ceti, 0.98 pc (3.20 ly) away from it. If $R_v=+29$ km/s then approximately 28,700 years ago Gliese 65 was at its minimal distance of 2.21 pc (7.2 ly) from the Sun.

Gliese 65 A was later found to be a variable star and given the variable star designation BL Ceti. It is a red dwarf of spectral type M5.5V. It is also a flare star, and classified as a UV Ceti variable type, but it is not nearly as remarkable or extreme in its behavior as its companion star UV Ceti.

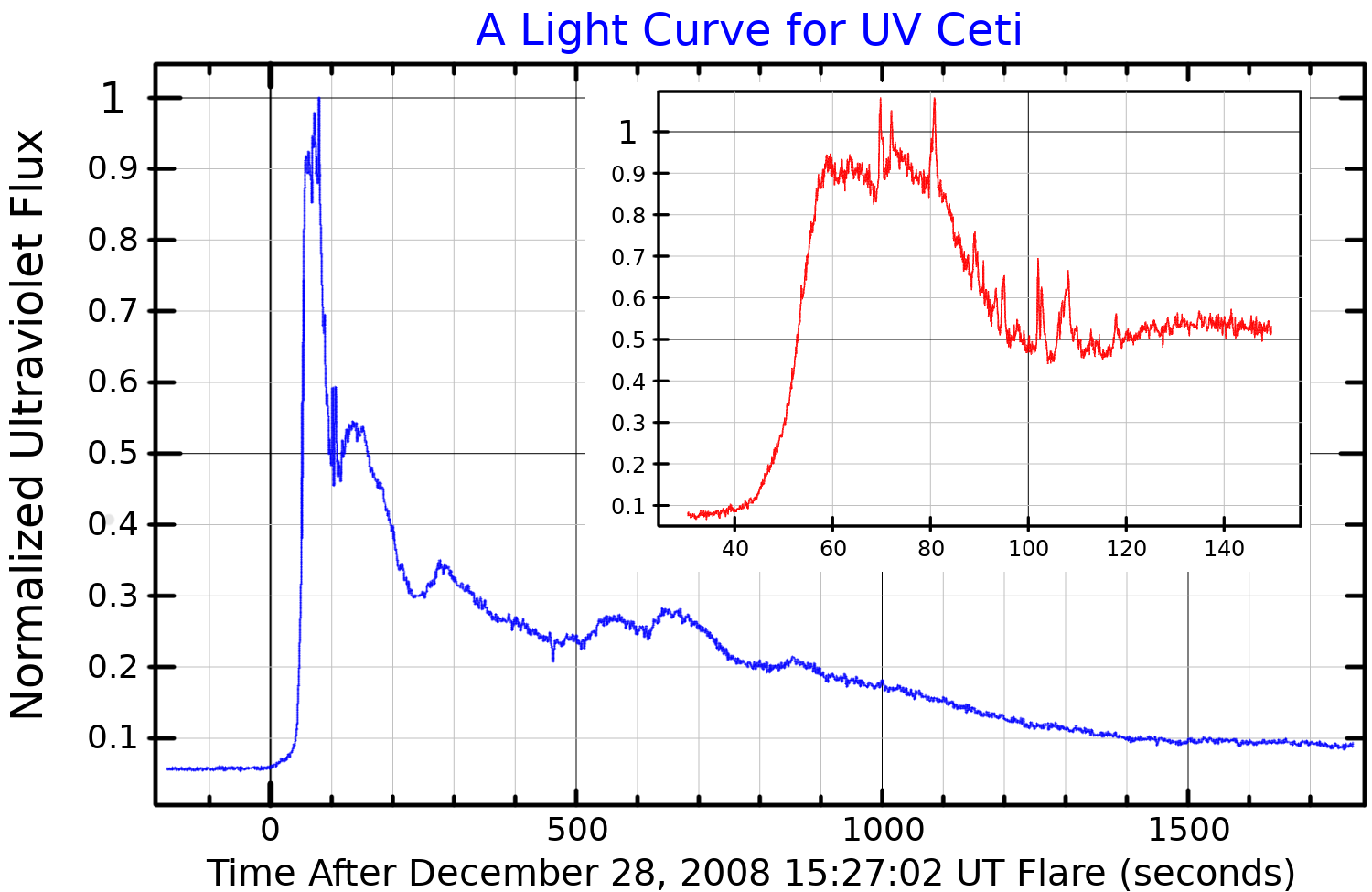
An ultraviolet light curve for UV Ceti, adapted from Beskin et al. (2017). The main plot shows the full flare event and the inset plot shows the time around peak brightness with an expanded time scale.

Soon after the discovery of Gliese 65 A, the companion star Gliese 65 B was discovered. Like Gliese 65 A, this star was also found to be variable and given the variable star designation UV Ceti. Although UV Ceti was not the first flare star discovered, it is the most prominent example of such a star, so similar flare stars are now classified as UV Ceti type variable stars. This star goes through fairly extreme changes of brightness: for instance, in 1952, its brightness increased by 75 times in only 20 seconds. UV Ceti is a red dwarf of spectral type M6V.

Both stars are listed as spectral standard stars for their respective classes, being considered typical examples of the classes.

In approximately 31,500 years, Gliese 65 will have a close encounter with Epsilon Eridani at the minimal distance of about 0.93 ly. Gliese 65 can penetrate a conjectured Oort cloud about Epsilon Eridani, which may gravitationally perturb some long-period comets. The duration of mutual transit of two star systems within 1 ly from each other is about 4,600 years.

Gliese 65 is a possible member of the Hyades Stream.

== Candidate planet ==
In 2024, a candidate super-Neptune-mass planet was detected in the Gliese 65 system via astrometry with Very Large Telescope's GRAVITY instrument. If it exists, it would orbit one of the two stars (it is unclear which) with a period of 156 days. The planet's properties change slightly depending on which star it orbits, but in general its mass is estimated to be about 40 M_{🜨} and the semi-major axis is about 30% of an astronomical unit. It is estimated to be about seven times the size of Earth based on mass-radius relationships.

The Gliese 65 planetary system (Note: The parameters are slightly different depending on whether the planet orbits star A (above) or star B (below).)
| Companion (in order from star) | Mass | Semimajor axis (AU) | Orbital period (days) | Eccentricity | Inclination (°) | Radius |
|---|---|---|---|---|---|---|
| b (unconfirmed) | 39±7 M_{🜨} 36±6 M_{🜨} | 0.283±0.002; 0.274±0.002 | 156±1 | 0.33±0.30; 0.27±0.21 | 88±6° 89±9° | ~7 (estimate) R_{🜨} |
