= DG Canum Venaticorum =

Binary star in constellation Canes Venatici

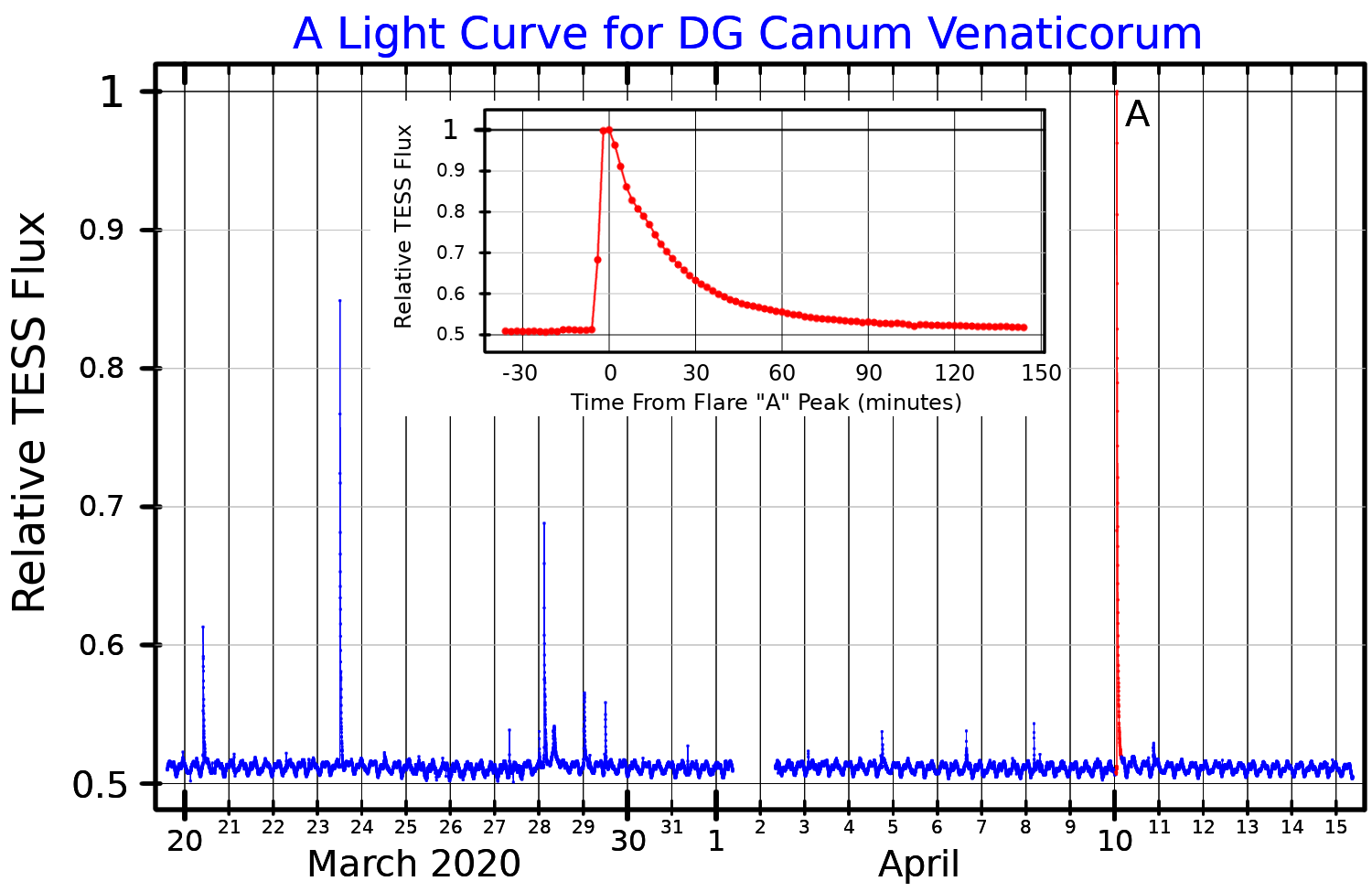
- A light curve for DG Canum Venaticorum, plotted from TESS data. The main plot shows both the low amplitude periodic oscillations, and several flares. The inset plot shows the strongest flare with an expanded time scale.

Observation data Epoch J2000.0 Equinox ICRS
- Constellation: Canes Venatici
- Right ascension: 13^{h} 31^{m} 46.617^{s}
- Declination: +29° 16′ 36.72″
- Apparent magnitude (V): 12.02 (12.64 + 12.93)

Characteristics
- Spectral type: M4.0Ve
- Variable type: Flare star + BY Dra

Astrometry
Radial velocity (R_{v})	−7.50±6.50 km/s
Proper motion (μ)	RA: −244.1±4.2 mas/yr Dec.: −132.4±4.8 mas/yr
Parallax (π)	55.51±2.38 mas
Distance	59 ± 3 ly (18.0 ± 0.8 pc)
Absolute magnitude (M_{V})	10.74 (11.36 + 11.65)

Details

A
Mass	0.39 M_{☉}
Radius	0.253 R_{☉}
Temperature	3,263 K
Metallicity [Fe/H]	0.15 dex
Rotational velocity (v sin i)	50 km/s

B
Mass	+0.07 M_{☉}
Age	30 Myr

Other designations
- DG CVn, G 165-8AB, GJ 3789, TYC 2003-139-1

Database references
SIMBAD	data
ARICNS	data

DG Canum Venaticorum is a variable binary star system in the northern constellation of Canes Venatici. As of 2009, the pair have an angular separation of 0.20″ along a position angle of 285°, which corresponds to a physical separation of around 3.6 AU. With an apparent visual magnitude of 12.02, the pair are much too faint to be seen with the naked eye. Parallax measurements place the system at a distance of roughly 59 light years (18.0 parsecs) from the Earth.

The stellar classification of the primary component is M4.0Ve, indicating it is a red dwarf with emission lines present. It is considered a very young system with an estimated age of just 30 million years and a higher metallicity than the Sun. One of the components is rotating rapidly, with a projected rotational velocity of 50 km/s.

In 1999, Russell M. Robb et al. discovered that the star, then called GSC 2003_139, is a variable star, exhibiting both periodic and flare brightness variations. Therefore, at least one of the members of this system is a type of variable known as a flare star, which means it undergoes brief increases in brightness at random intervals. It was given its variable star designation, DG Canum Venaticorum, in 2001. On April 23, 2014, a gamma-ray superflare event was observed by the Swift satellite coming from the position of this system. It may have been perhaps the most luminous such events ever observed coming from a red dwarf star. A secondary radio flare was observed a day later.
