= Neupert effect =

Solar flare phenomenon

The Neupert effect refers to an empirical tendency for high-energy ('hard') X-ray emission to coincide temporally with the rate of rise of lower-energy ('soft') X-ray emission of a solar flare. Here 'hard' and 'soft' mean above and below an energy of about 10 keV to solar physicists, though in non-solar X-ray astronomy one typically sets this boundary at a lower energy.

This effect gets its name from NASA solar physicist and spectroscopist Werner Neupert, who first documented a related correlation (the integral form) between microwave (gyrosynchrotron) and soft X-ray emissions in 1968. The standard interpretation is that the electrons accelerated in the corona, which produce the hard X-rays via non-thermal bremsstrahlung), release most of their energy via collisions in the lower solar atmosphere (the chromosphere. This energy then leads to thermal (soft X-ray) emission as the chromospheric plasma heats and (somewhat counterintuitively) expands into the corona. More generally, the phenomenon naturally results from juxtaposing the shorter time scales of the lower solar atmosphere with the longer time scales of cooling for the coronal flare effects. The effect is very common, but does not represent an exact relationship and is not observed in all solar flares.

== See also ==
- Solar flare
- X-ray astronomy
