= RS Canum Venaticorum =

Binary star in the constellation Canes Venatici

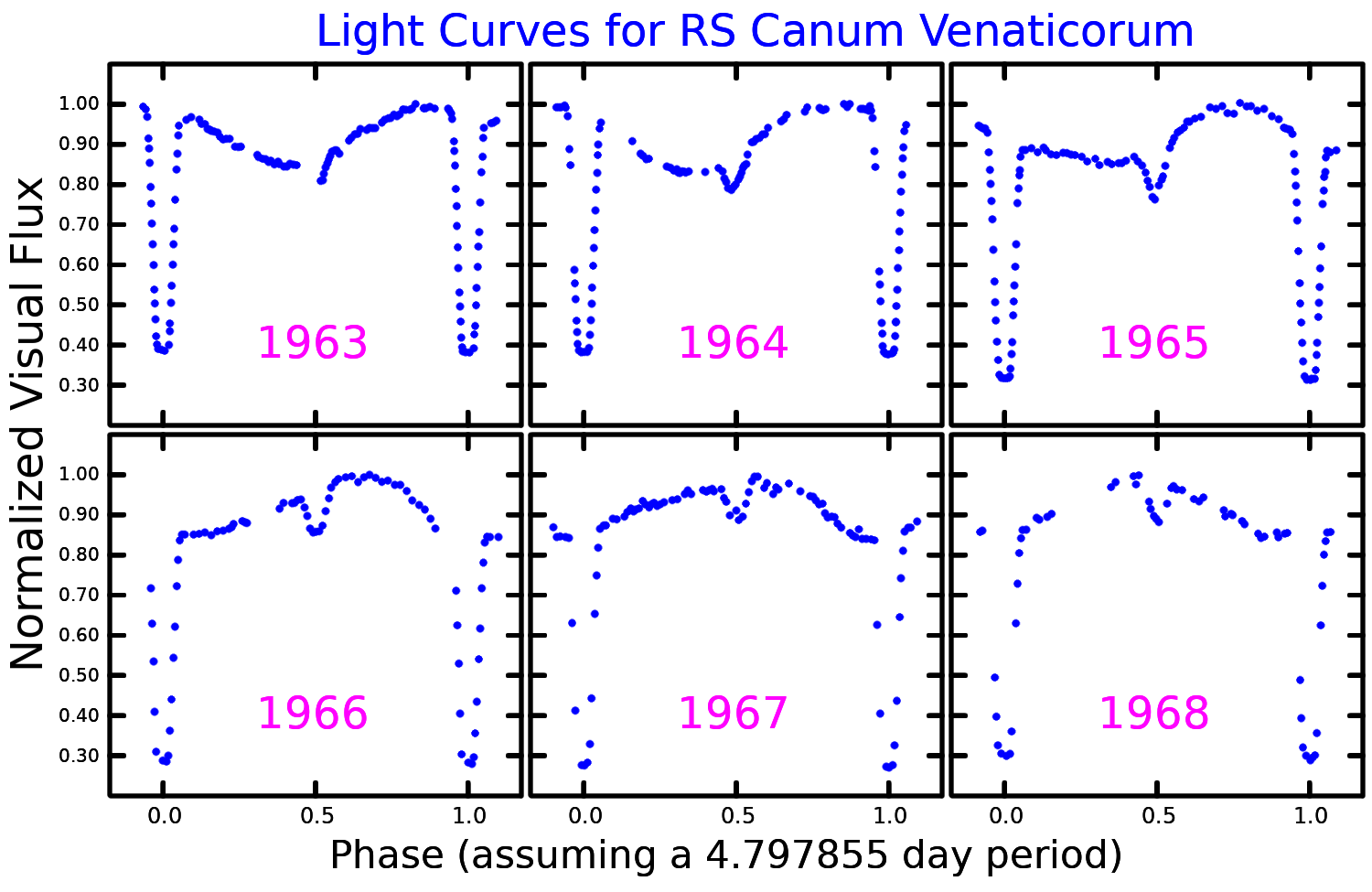
- Visual band light curves for RS Canum Venaticorum, adapted from Rodonò et al. (1995)

Observation data Epoch J2000.0 Equinox J2000.0
- Constellation: Canes Venatici
- Right ascension: 13^{h} 10^{m} 36.908^{s}
- Declination: +35° 56′ 05.58″
- Apparent magnitude (V): 7.93 to 9.14 (secondary: 8.19)

Characteristics

A
- Evolutionary stage: Main-sequence
- Spectral type: F6IV or F5V
- B−V color index: 0.46

B
- Evolutionary stage: Subgiant
- Spectral type: G8IV or K2IV
- B−V color index: 0.91
- Variable type: Algol and RS CVn

Astrometry
| Radial velocity (R_{v}) | −13.62±0.44 km/s |
| Proper motion (μ) | RA: −49.898 mas/yr Dec.: +20.754 mas/yr |
| Parallax (π) | 7.3486±0.0225 mas |
| Distance | 444 ± 1 ly (136.1 ± 0.4 pc) |
| Absolute magnitude (M_{V}) | 2.95 |

Orbit
| Period (P) | 4.797695 d |
| Eccentricity (e) | 0.00 |
| Inclination (i) | 85.55° |
| Periastron epoch (T) | 2,448,379.1993 HJD |
| Semi-amplitude (K_{1}) (primary) | 90.2±0.1 km/s |
| Semi-amplitude (K_{2}) (secondary) | 84.3 km/s |

Details

A
| Mass | 1.44 M_{☉} |
| Radius | 2.1 R_{☉} |
| Temperature | 6,800 K |
| Rotation | 8.542 d |
| Rotational velocity (v sin i) | 11±2 km/s |
| Age | 2.5 Gyr |

B
| Mass | 1.31 M_{☉} |
| Radius | 4.3 R_{☉} |
| Temperature | 4,580 K |
| Rotational velocity (v sin i) | 42±3 km/s |

Other designations
- RS CVn, BD−36°2344, GJ 501.1, GJ 9430, HD 114519, HIP 64293, SAO 63382, WDS J13106+3556

Database references
| SIMBAD | data |

RS Canum Venaticorum is a binary star system in the northern constellation of Canes Venatici. It serves as the prototype to the class of RS Canum Venaticorum variables. The peak apparent visual magnitude of this system is below the level needed to observe it with the naked eye. It is located at a distance of approximately 443 light years from the Sun based on parallax, but is drifting closer with a net radial velocity of −14 km/s. Olin J. Eggen (1991) included this system as a member of the IC 2391 supercluster, but it was later excluded.

== Variability ==
The variable nature of RS Canum Venaticorum was discovered by the Russian astronomer Lidiya Tseraskaya in 1914. It is a detached binary in a close, circular orbit with a period of 4.8 days. The orbital plane is inclined by an angle of 85.55° to the line of sight from the Earth, causing this to be viewed from Earth as an eclipsing binary. Some of the brightness variations are caused by large spots on the surface of the star. Similar variable stars are known as RS Canum Venaticorum variables.

Some RS Canum Venaticorum variables, including this star, also undergo eclipses. The primary eclipse minimum decreases the visual brightness of the system by 1.21 magnitudes, while the secondary minimum decreases it by 0.26 magnitudes. The exact magnitudes vary somewhat due to the inherent variability of the secondary. The General Catalogue of Variable Stars lists magnitude 8.19 for the secondary minimum and 9.14 for the primary minimum.

== Components ==
The primary component is a relatively inactive F-type main-sequence star with a stellar classification of F5V. It has 2.1 times the radius of the Sun with a projected rotational velocity of about 11 km/s. That rate is slower than expected if the rotation of the star were locked with its orbital period. It has an estimated age of 2.5 billion years.

The secondary component is a magnetically active K-type subgiant star with a class of K2 IV. It has 4.3 times the Sun's radius and a relatively high rotation rate with a projected rotational velocity of 42 km/s. This rapid spin was likely driven by interaction with the primary, and it generates the surface magnetic activity that makes the star variable. As with the Sun, it is undergoing differential rotation.

Lower temperature starspots cover a significant fraction of the secondary's surface, causing light variation as the star rotates. These are found at several active latitudes on the star below 70°, and appear to migrate at the rate of 0.1° per day. The total amount of spots varies in intensity with a cycle of 19.7±1.9 years, ranging from 17% to 37% coverage of the surface. The luminosity also varies slightly (0.01) due to proximity and reflection from the primary star. X-ray emission has been detected from this star with a luminosity of 2.14×10^{31} erg s^{−1}. It has also been detected in the radio band.
