= RS Canum Venaticorum variable =

Type of variable star

An RS Canum Venaticorum variable is a type of variable star. The variable type consists of close binary stars having active chromospheres which can cause large stellar spots. These spots are believed to cause variations in their observed luminosity. Systems can exhibit variations on timescales of years due to variation in the spot surface coverage fraction, as well as periodic variations which are, in general, close to the orbital period of the binary system. Some systems exhibit variations in luminosity due to their being eclipsing binaries. Typical brightness fluctuation is around 0.2 magnitudes. They take their name from the star RS Canum Venaticorum (abbreviated RS CVn). A nearby example is χ^{1} Orionis, at only 28 light years away.

== Classification ==
Otto Struve (1946) first called attention to the group, but it was Oliver (1974) who was the first to formally propose a set of observational characteristics to define the RS CVn criteria. The working definition, as it is used today, was that set down by Hall (1976).

The RS CVn systems are divided into five separate subgroups:

- Regular systems. Orbital periods are between 1 and 14 days. The hotter component is of the spectral type F or G and luminosity class V or IV. Strong Ca II H and K emission is seen outside eclipse.
- Short period systems. Components are detached and orbital periods are less than 1 day. The hotter component is of the spectral type F or G and luminosity class V or IV. Ca II H and K emission is displayed in one or both components.
- Long period systems. Orbital periods is greater than 14 days. Either component is of the spectral type G through K and luminosity class II through IV. Strong Ca II H and K emission is seen outside eclipse.
- Flare star systems. In this case the hotter component is of the spectral type dKe or dMe, where the emission refers to strong Ca II H and K.
- V471 Tau type systems. The hotter component is a white dwarf. The cooler component, spectral class G through K, displays strong Ca II H and K emission.

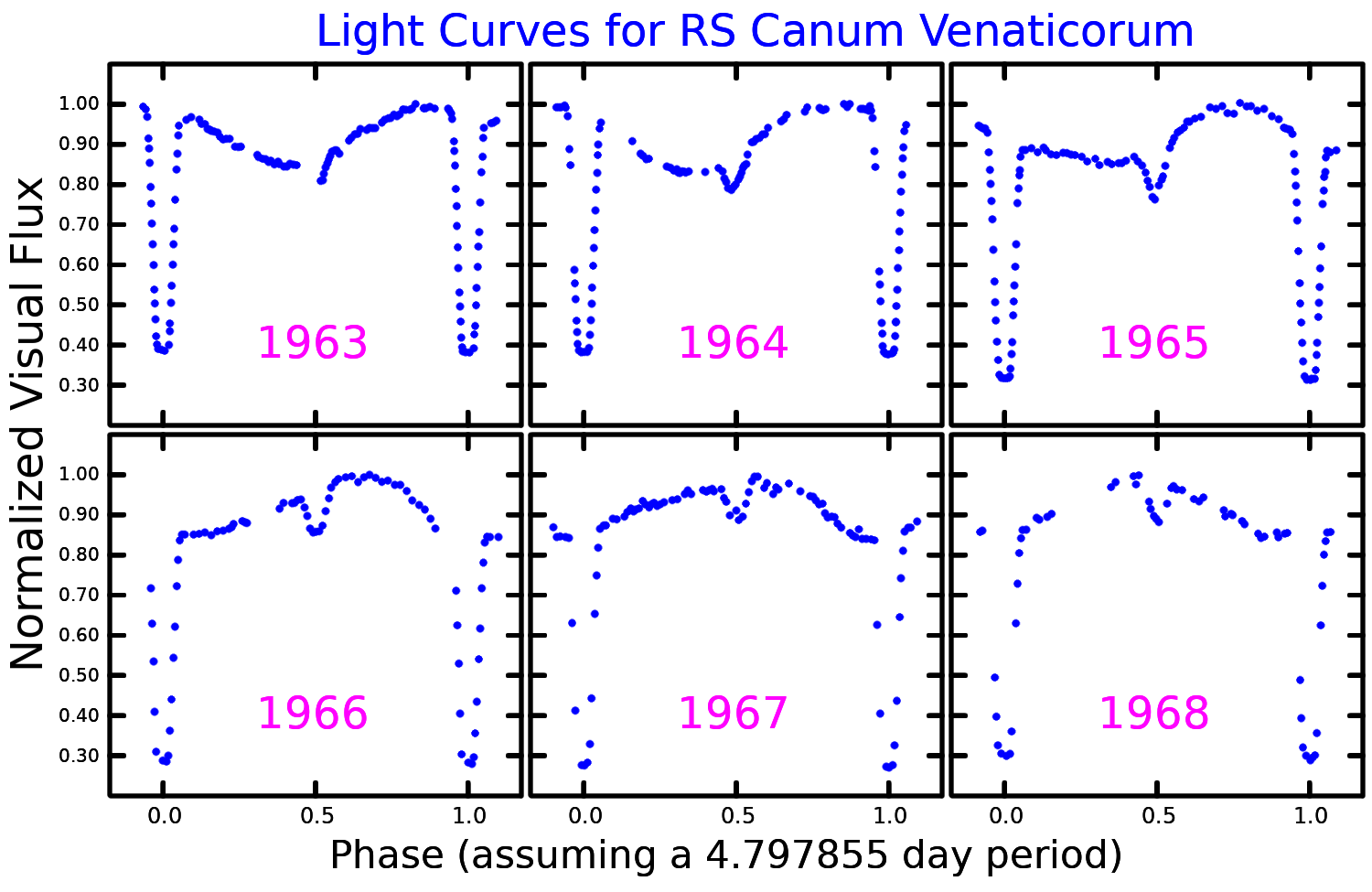
Visual band light curves for RS Canum Venaticorum, adapted from Rodonò et al. (1995)

The light curves of RS CVn type systems show a peculiar semiperiodic structure outside eclipse. This structure has been referred to as a distortion wave in the light curve. Eaton and Hall (1979) determined that the simplest mechanism for the creation of the distortion wave was "starspots", which, in analogy to sunspots, are large, cool active regions on the photosphere. Such spots have since been observed indirectly on many systems.

Chromospheric activity is signaled by the presence of emission cores in the Ca II H and K resonance lines. Balmer emission, or Hα, is also associated with active chromospheres. X-ray emission is known as a tracer for active coronal regions, and ultraviolet (UV) emission and flaring are, by solar analogy, known to be associated with stellar active and transition regions. These areas on the Sun are associated with intense magnetic fields, and sunspot activity is enhanced in and around these magnetically active regions.

Some RS CVn type stars are known X-ray and radio emitters. The radio emission is nonthermal in origin (gyrosynchrotron) and is one of the few direct indicators of magnetic fields. The X-ray luminosities are on the order of L_{x} >> 10^{24} watts. This emission has been interpreted, in solar analogy, as being caused by a hot, T ~ 10^{7} K, corona.

Another subgroup of RS CVns is known to have infrared excess emission, seen by the Spitzer Space Telescope
